= Lidia Pleskachova =

Russian figure skater

Lidia Pleskacheva
Personal information
- Native name: Лидия Дмитриевна Плескачёва
- Full name: Lidia Dmitrievna Pleskacheva
- Born: 11 April 2010 (age 16) Moscow, Russia
- Home town: Moscow, Russia

Figure skating career
- Country: Russia (Individual Neutral Athletes) Individual Neutral Athlete (since 2026)
- Discipline: Women's singles
- Coach: Svetlana Panova, Tatiana Moiseeva, Maria Kasumova

Lidia Dmitrievna Pleskacheva (Russian: Лидия Дмитриевна Плескачёва, pron. Pleskachova; off. sp.: Lidiia Pleskacheva; born 11 April 2010) is a Russian figure skater. She is the 2024 Russian Juniors bronze and the 2026 silver medalist and the 2026 Russian Junior Grand Prix Final silver medalist.

She has landed the triple Axel in domestic competition. As of 2026, she trains under Svetlana Panova, Tatiana Moiseeva, and Maria Kasumova.

== Early life ==
Lidia Pleskacheva was born 11 April 2010. She took on figure skating following her sister Sofia, two years her senior, into the sport. She was also enrolled in piano and acrobatics, but when it became difficult to balance all three, she chose figure skating because she liked it the most.

== Career ==
=== 2023/2024 season ===
In February 2024, she finished third, behind Margarita Bazyliuk and Alisa Dvoeglazova, at the Russian Junior Figure Skating Championships.

=== 2024/2025 season ===
In late October 2024, she won the 2nd Russian Junior Grand Prix stage, held in Magnitogorsk. At the 3rd stage in Moscow, she won bronze.

In February 2025, she finished eighth at the Russian Junior Figure Skating Championships.

In early April 2025, she won silver at the separate Russian Junior Championships for the oldest age category held in Kazan.

=== 2025/2026 season ===
In late 2025, she was fourth at the 5th Russian Junior Grand Prix stage, held in Moscow, and then won the 6th Russian Grand Prix stage, held in Omsk.

In February 2026, she won silver, behind Elena Kostyleva, at the Russian Junior Figure Skating Championships, held in Saransk.

In March 2026, she won silver, behind Sofia Dzepka, at the Russian Junior Grand Prix Final, her first medal at a Grand Prix Final.

In April, she won the Commonwealth of Independent States Cup in the junior category.

=== 2026/2027 season ===
In early October 2026, she made a domestic senior debut at the Moscow Figure Skating Championships and won bronze.

In late October – early November, she won gold at the 3rd Russian Grand Prix stage, Krasnoyarsk, her debut Russian Grand Prix event as a senior. She won both the short and the free programs. She successfully landed a triple Axel in both the short and the free, breaking her personal record with a score of 224.82.

In mid-November, she won gold at the 5th Russian Grand Prix stage, held in Omsk, winning both the short and the free. She came under criticism on the internet for overreacting to her victory. Yet again, she successfully landed a triple Axel in both the short and the free programs.

== Programs ==
| Season | Short program | Free skating |
|---|---|---|
| 2026–27 | A Slave of Love soundtrack by Eduard Artemyev | The Queen of Spades by Pyotr Ilyich Tchaikovsky |
| 2025–26 | Gisele's Mania soundtrack by Leonid Desyatnikov | "Don't Stop Me Now", etc. by Queen |
| 2024–25 | Piano Concerto in A minor by Edvard Grieg | "Splish Splash" by Bobby Darin |

== Competitive highlights ==
Competition placements at senior level
| Season | 2026–27 |
|---|---|
| Moscow Championships | 3rd |
| Russian Grand Prix stage 3 | 1st |
| Russian Grand Prix stage 5 | 1st |
