= Nikolai Ugozhaev =

Russian figure skater (born 2006)

- Ugozhaev at the 2026 Russian Championships

Personal information
- Native name: Николай Михайлович Угожаев
- Full name: Nikolai Mikhaillovich Ugozhaev
- Born: 15 June 2006 (age 20) Novosibirsk, Russia
- Height: 1.83 m (6 ft 0 in)

Figure skating career
- Country: (Individual Neutral Athletes) Individual Neutral Athlete; Russia
- Discipline: Men's singles
- Coach: Dmitri Khromin
- Skating club: FS Sport Club of Tamara Moskvina, St. Petersburg
- Began skating: 2010

Nikolai Mikhailovich Ugozhaev (Russian: Николай Михайлович Угожаев, born 15 June 2006) is a Russian figure skater who currently competes as an Individual Neutral Athlete. He is the 2024 Cup of Russia stage in Krasnoyarsk champion, 2025 Russian Jumping Championship champion, 2022 Russian Junior Championship silver medalist, 2024 Final Cup of Russia juniors bronze medalist.

== Personal life ==
Ugozhaev was born on 15 June 2006 in Novosibirsk, Russia. His grandfather, Vladimir Ugozhaev, is a physicist. He invented rotationally tunable double-beam interferometer.

Nikolai's height is 183 cm.

== Career ==
=== Early years ===
Ugozhaev started figure skating at the age of 4. His first coach was Marina Yazovtseva. At the age of 10, Nikolai moved to St. Petersburg. Veronika Daineko became his coach at the skating club Star Ice. In 2017, Ugozhaev and Daineko moved to FS Sport Club of Tamara Moskvina. Later, Ugozhaev moved to coach Dmitri Khromin at the same club.

=== 2018–2019 season ===
In the 2018–19 season, Ugozhaev made his debut at the Russian Junior Cup stages and took 6th and 9th places. This result did not allow to qualify for the Russian Junior Championship and the Russian Junior Cup Final.

=== 2019–2020 season ===
Ugozhaev started his season with a silver medal at the Russian Junior Cup stage. At this tournament he landed combination Triple Axel - Triple Toe Loop. But he missed the rest of the season.

=== 2020–2021 season ===
In the 2020–21 season, Ugozhaev won the Russian Junior Cup stage for the first time. At another stage, he won a bronze medal and qualified for the Russian Junior Championship and the Russian Junior Cup Final. At his debut Russian Junior Championship, Ugozhaev took 5th place. At the Russian Junior Cup Final, Ugozhaev won a bronze medal. He was leading after the short program, but finished fourth in the free skate and dropped to third in the final standings.

=== 2021–2022 season ===
In the first part of the season, Ugozhaev won gold and silver at the Russian Junior Cup stages. He also made his international debut, finishing 4th at the Denis Ten Memorial Challenge among juniors. In February 2022, Nikolai won the Jégvirág Cup among juniors. At the Russian Junior Championships, Ugozhaev won a silver medal. But after that he performed poorly at the Russian Junior Cup Final and took only 11th place.

=== 2022–2023 season ===
In the 2022–23 season, Nikolai won silver and bronze at the Russian Junior Cup stages. At the Russian Junior Championships, Ugozhaev took 6th place and landed a Quad Toe Loop. At the Russian Junior Cup Final, he took 5th place and landed Quad Lutz.

=== 2023–2024 season ===
This season was Ugozhaev's last at the junior level. Nikolai won his first stage of the Russian Junior Cup in the 2023–24 season and landed Quad Flip. At another stage he won silver. 10th place at the Russian Junior Championships was the worst result in Ugozhaev's career. He was in 2nd place after the short program, but only finished 15th in the free skate. But at the Russian Junior Cup Final, Nikolai landed Quad Lutz, Quad Flip and two Triple Axels in his free program and won bronze with a score of 270.03 points.

=== 2024–2025 season ===
The first tournament of the season for Ugozhaev was the St. Petersburg Cup stage. He won gold and also landed two quads in the short program and three quads in the free skate. At the Panin-Kolomenkin Memorial, Nikolai landed cleanly 4 out of 5 quads in two programs and 1 quad landed with a small mistake, but did the other elements better, including three Triple Axels, and scored 303.45 points. In the free program, he landed three different quads, Toe Loop, Lutz and Flip for the first time. At the debut stage of the Russian Сup at the senior level, Ugozhaev took 5th place. After that, Nikolai won his second stage of the Russian Cup, scoring 292.56 points.

Ugozhaev at the 2026 Russian Championships

Ugozhaev performed poorly at his debut Russian Championship, made many mistakes and finished in 14th place. But then he won the Russian Jumping Championship, beating Vladislav Dikidzhi, Evgeni Semenenko, Mark Kondratiuk, Petr Gumennik and other figure skaters from the Russian national team. At the Russian Cup final, Ugozhaev took 7th place.

=== 2025–2026 season ===
Ugozhaev placed 10th at the 2026 Russian Championships.

=== 2026–2027 season ===
On 30 June 2026, the International Skating Union announced that figure skaters from Russia and Belarus would be allowed to compete at international competitions as Individual Neutral Athletes (AINs). Each of these skaters are be required to undergo an individual assessment conducted by the ISU Council to determine whether they meet the criteria for neutral status. Ugozhaev's application was approved, making him eligible to compete internationally as a neutral athlete.

== Programs ==
	Short Program	Free skating
2025–2026	au sommet de ma tour by Lonepsi	Les Boréades: RCT 31, Acte IV, Scène IV: Entrée pour les Muses, les Zéphyres, les Saisons, les Heures et les Arts; RCT 44, Nouvelle entrée, Les sauvages, Scène VI: Rondeau - Duo et choeur "Forêts paisibles" by Teodor Currentzis
2024–2025	In the End by Linkin Park, 2WEI choreo. by Nikolai Moroshkin	Saint Laurent Men's Spring/Summer'21 choreo. by Nikolai Moroshkin
2023–2024	Nemesis by Benjamin Clementine choreo. by Nikolai Moroshkin	Saint Laurent Men's Spring/Summer'21 choreo. by Nikolai Moroshkin
2022–2023	Shape of My Heart by Sting choreo. by Nikolai Moroshkin	Buenos Aires Hora Cero by Gidon Kremer choreo. by Nikolai Moroshkin
2021–2022	Iron; Run Boy Run by Woodkid	The Master and Margarita (soundtrack) by Igor Kornelyuk
2020–2021	Iron; Run Boy Run by Woodkid	Somebody To Love; We Will Rock You; Doing All Right by Queen
2019-2020	Flamenco	Io Ci Sarò by Andrea Bocelli
2018–2019	Flamenco	Csárdás by Vittorio Monti
2017–2018	Nightmare by Ronan Hardiman	Bahamut by Hazmat Modine
2016–2017	Nightmare by Ronan Hardiman	Bahamut by Hazmat Modine

== Competitive highlights ==
=== Skating as an Individual Neutral Athlete ===
Competition placements at senior level
Season	2026–27
CS Trialeti Trophy	2nd

=== Skating for Russia ===
International: Junior
Event	20–21	21–22	22–23	23–24	24–25	25–26
Denis Ten Memorial Challenge		4th				
Jégvirág Cup		1st				
Russian–Chinese Winter Youth Games			3rd			
National
Russian Champ.					14th	10th
Russian Junior	5th	2nd	6th	10th		
Russian Cup Final (Note: The 2023 Russian Cup Final was renamed as the 2023 Russian Grand Prix Final.)					7th	
Russian Cup Junior Final	3rd	11th	5th	3rd		

== Detailed results ==
=== Skating as an Individual Neutral Athlete ===
Results in the 2026–27 season
Date	Event	SP		FS		Total	
Date	Event	P	Score	P	Score	P	Score
1–4 Oct, 2026	(Georgia (country)) 2026 CS Trialeti Trophy	3	82.96	2	153.45	2	236.41

=== Skating for Russia ===
2024–2025 season
Date	Event	SP	FS	Total
14–16 February 2025	2025 Russian Grand Prix Final	7 91.29	7 179.47	7 270.76
19–22 December 2024	2025 Russian Championships	15 67.44	14 155.91	14 223.35

=== Junior ===
2023–2024 season
Date	Event	Level	SP	FS	Total
13–16 March 2024	2024 Russian Cup Final	Junior	2 88.34	3 181.69	3 270.03
5–9 February 2024	2024 Russian Junior Championships	Junior	2 83.83	15 138.77	10 222.60
2022–2023 season
Date	Event	Level	SP	FS	Total
1–3 March 2023	2023 Russian Cup Final	Junior	3 80.88	5 161.26	5 242.14
14–18 February 2023	2023 Russian Junior Championships	Junior	4 81.78	6 153.15	6 234.93
14–20 December 2022	2022 Russian–Chinese Winter Youth Games	Junior	3 62.06	3 133.20	3 195.26
2021–2022 season
Date	Event	Level	SP	FS	Total
23–27 February 2022	2022 Russian Cup Final	Junior	11 68.66	11 133.52	11 202.18
11–13 February 2022	2022 Jégvirág Cup	Junior	1 62.02	1 116.83	1 178.85
18–22 January 2022	2022 Russian Junior Championships	Junior	6 79.87	3 147.95	2 227.82
27–31 October 2021	2021 Denis Ten Memorial Challenge	Junior	5 67.57	5 135.88	4 203.45
2020–2021 season
Date	Event	Level	SP	FS	Total
26 Feb. – 2 Mar. 2021	2021 Russian Cup Final	Junior	1 82.39	4 139.79	3 222.18
1–5 February 2021	2021 Russian Junior Championships	Junior	8 76.27	5 152.14	5 228.41
