= 2026 Russian Figure Skating Championships =

- Type: National championship
- Date: 17–21 December 2025 (S); 4–8 February 2026 (J)
- Season: 2025–26
- Location: Saint Petersburg (S); Saransk (J)
- Host: Figure Skating Federation of Russia
- Venue: Yubileyny Sports Palace (S); Universal Hall Ogarev Arena (J)

Champions
- Men's singles: Petr Gumennik (S); Lev Lazarev (J)
- Women's singles: Adeliia Petrosian (S); Elena Kostyleva (J)
- Pairs: Aleksandra Boikova / Dmitrii Kozlovskii (S); Polina Shesheleva / Egor Karnaukhov (J)
- Ice dance: Alexandra Stepanova / Ivan Bukin (S); Maria Fefelova / Artem Valov (J)
- Previous: 2025 Russian Championships
- Next: 2027 Russian Championships

The 2026 Russian Figure Skating Championships (Russian: Чемпионат России по фигурному катанию на коньках 2026) were held from 17 to 21 December 2025 in Saint Petersburg. Medals were awarded in the disciplines of men's singles, women's singles, pairs, and ice dance.

== Qualifying ==
In the 2025–26 season, Russian skaters competed in domestic qualifying events and national championships for various age levels. Russian Grand Prix for senior skaters and the All-Russian competitions for junior skaters, leads to four events – the Russian Championships, the Russian Junior Championships, the Russian Grand Prix Final and the All-Russian final competitions "Federation Cup".

From March 1, 2022, onwards, the International Skating Union banned all figure skaters and officials from Russia and Belarus from attending any international competitions following the 2022 Russian invasion of Ukraine. As a result, all skaters were required to qualify through the Russian Grand Prix and the All-Russian competitions' series.

Date	Event	Type	Location	Details
14–17 October 2025	Ice of Dreams	Qualifier	Moscow	Details
22–27 October 2025	Russian Grand Prix; Stars of Magnitka	Qualifier	Magnitogorsk, Chelyabinsk Oblast	Details; Details
30 October – 4 November 2025	Russian Grand Prix; Krasnoyarye	Qualifier	Krasnoyarsk, Krasnoyarsk Krai	Details; Details
5–10 November 2025	Russian Grand Prix; Idel–2025	Qualifier	Kazan, Tatarstan	Details; Details
11–17 November 2025	Russian Grand Prix; Golden Skate of Moscow	Qualifier	Moscow	Details; Details
19–24 November 2025	Russian Grand Prix; Heart of Siberia	Qualifier	Omsk, Omsk Oblast	Details; Details
17–21 December 2025	2026 Russian Championships	Final	Saint Petersburg	Details
4–8 February 2026	2026 Russian Junior Championships	Final	Saransk, Mordovia	Details
24–28 February 2026	2026 Russian Youth Championships – Younger Age	Final	Tver, Tver Oblast	Details
4–9 March 2026	2026 Russian Grand Prix Final; 2026 Federation Cup	Final	Chelyabinsk, Chelyabinsk Oblast	Details; Details
1–5 April 2026	2026 Russian Youth Championships – Elder Age	Final	Yoshkar-Ola, Mari El	Details

== Medalists of most important competitions ==
Senior Championships
Discipline	Gold	Silver	Bronze
Men	Petr Gumennik	Evgeni Semenenko	Mark Kondratiuk
Women	Adeliia Petrosian	Alisa Dvoeglazova	Mariia Zakharova
Pairs	Aleksandra Boikova / Dmitrii Kozlovskii	Anastasia Mishina / Aleksandr Galliamov	Ekaterina Chikmareva / Matvei Ianchenkov
Ice dance	Alexandra Stepanova / Ivan Bukin	Vasilisa Kaganovskaia / Maxim Nekrasov	Elizaveta Pasechnik / Dario Cirisano
Junior Championships
Discipline	Gold	Silver	Bronze
Men	Lev Lazarev	Arseny Fedotov	Gleb Kovtun
Women	Elena Kostyleva	Lidia Pleskachova	Victoria Streltsova
Pairs	Polina Shesheleva / Egor Karnaukhov	Polina Sazhina / Aleksei Belkin	Taiisia Guseva / Daniil Ovchinnikov
Ice dance	Maria Fefelova / Artem Valov	Zoya Pestova / Sergei Lagutov	Elizaveta Maleina / Matvei Samokhin
Russian Grand Prix Final and All-Russian final competitions "Federation Cup"
Discipline	Gold	Silver	Bronze
Men	Petr Gumennik	Evgeni Semenenko	Nikolai Ugozhaev
Women	Alisa Dvoeglazova	Daria Sadkova	Kamilla Neliubova
Pairs	Aleksandra Boikova / Dmitrii Kozlovskii	Anastasia Mishina / Aleksandr Galliamov	Ekaterina Chikmareva / Matvei Ianchenkov
Ice dance	Alexandra Stepanova / Ivan Bukin	Vasilisa Kaganovskaia / Maxim Nekrasov	Ekaterina Mironova / Evgenii Ustenko
Junior men	Lev Lazarev	Arseny Fedotov	German Lenkov
Junior women	Sofia Dzepka	Lidia Pleskachova	Sofia Smagina
Junior pairs	Polina Shesheleva / Egor Karnaukhov	Zoya Kovyazina / Artemiy Mokhov	Sofia Diana Cousins / Aleksandr Bregey
Junior ice dance	Maria Fefelova / Artem Valov	Zoya Pestova / Sergei Lagutov	Varvara Slutskaya / Gleb Goncharov
Youth Championships – Elder Age
Discipline	Gold	Silver	Bronze
Men	Makar Solodnikov	German Lenkov	Nikolay Kolesnikov
Women	Ekaterina Korchazhnikova	Arina Orekhovskaya	Alisa Zaikina
Pairs	Zoya Kovyazina / Artemiy Mokhov	Arina Parsegova / Matvei Bogdanov	Viktoria Dvinina / Viktor Potapov
Ice dance	Polina Zharova / Aleksei Stolyarov	Milana Zhabina / Veniamin Bashurov	Anna Soboleva / Matvei Churakov
Youth Championships – Younger Age
Discipline	Gold	Silver	Bronze
Men	Artem Fedotov	Kirill Zhurakhovskiy	Lev Evdokimov
Women	Alisa Zaikina	Ekaterina Korchazhnikova	Anna Dokunina
Pairs	No pairs' discipline		
Ice dance	No ice dance discipline		

== Senior Championships ==
The 2026 Russian Championships were held in Saint Petersburg from 17 to 21 December 2025. Qualification was based on Russian Grand Prix series' results. In addition, figure skaters who were included in official pre-season national team roster but were unable to qualify through the Russian Grand Prix due to good reasons, could be included into list of participants by decision of the executive committee of the Figure Skating Federation of Russia.

=== Schedule ===
Listed in local time (UTC+03:00).

Day	Date	Start	Finish	Discipline	Event
Day 1	18 December	16:00	18:20	Ice dance	Rhythm dance
Day 1	18 December	18:45	20:50	Pairs	Short program
Day 2	19 December	15:30	18:05	Men	Short program
Day 2	19 December	18:25	21:00	Women	Short program
Day 3	20 December	13:00	15:30	Ice dance	Free dance
Day 3	20 December	15:45	17:50	Pairs	Free skating
Day 3	20 December	18:05	21:00	Women	Free skating
Day 4	21 December	15:00	17:55	Men	Free skating
Day 4	21 December	18:10	18:45		Victory ceremonies
Day 4	21 December	19:00	21:30		Exhibition gala

=== Preliminary entries ===
The Figure Skating Federation of Russia published the official list of participants on 9 December 2025.

Men	Women	Pairs	Ice dance
Mark Kondratiuk	Adeliia Petrosian	Aleksandra Boikova / Dmitrii Kozlovskii	Alexandra Stepanova / Ivan Bukin
Petr Gumennik	Alisa Dvoeglazova	Anastasia Mishina / Aleksandr Galliamov	Vasilisa Kaganovskaia / Maxim Nekrasov
Evgeni Semenenko	Daria Sadkova	Ekaterina Chikmareva / Matvei Ianchenkov	Ekaterina Mironova / Evgenii Ustenko
Vladislav Dikidzhi	Dina Khusnutdinova	Anastasia Mukhortova / Dmitry Evgenyev	Elizaveta Shichina / Pavel Drozd
Nikolai Ugozhaev	~~Alina Gorbacheva~~ (withdrew)	Taisiia Shcherbinina / Artem Petrov	Ekaterina Rybakova / Ivan Makhnonosov
Grigory Fedorov	Anna Frolova	Elizaveta Osokina / Artem Gritsaenko	Anna Shcherbakova / Egor Goncharov
Makar Ignatov	Mariia Zakharova	Iuliia Artemeva / Aleksei Briukhanov	Varvara Zhdanova / Timur Babaev-Smirnov
Artur Danielian	Anna Lyashenko	Veronika Merenkova / Danil Galimov	Elizaveta Pasechnik / Dario Cirisano
Aleksandr Melnikov	Elizaveta Kulikova	Valeria Khodykina / Daniil Butenko	Anna Kolomenskaya / Artem Frolov
Roman Savosin	Sofia Muravieva	Alisa Blinnikova / Aleksei Karpov	Sofia Shevchenko / Andrei Ezhlov
Andrei Mozalev	Ksenia Gushchina	Maya Shegay / Andrei Shaderkov	Sofia Leontieva / Daniil Gorelkin
Artem Kovalev	Kseniia Sinitsyna	Anna Moskaleva / Artem Rodzyanov	Milana Kuzmina / Dmitrii Studenikin
Nikita Sarnovskiy	Veronika Yametova		Taisiia Linchevskaia / Dmitrii Shcherbakov
Gleb Lutfullin	Maria Elisova		Alisa Abdullina / Egor Petrov
Matvei Vetlugin	Kamilla Neliubova		Olga Fyodorova / Pavel Drako
Daniil Samsonov	Arina Kudlai		
Damir Cheripka	Maria Pulina		
Semyon Soloviev	Eva Zubkova		
Substitutes
Mikhail Polyanskiy	Maria Mazur (added)	Daria Andreeva / Aleksandr Akimov	Vasilisa Grigoreva / Evgeni Artyushchenko
Arseny Dimitriev	Sofia Vazhnova	Eva Khmelkova / Vladislav Antonyshev	Alexandra Prokopets / Alexander Vaskovich
Ilya Mavlyanov	~~Sofia Akateva~~ (added, but withdrew)	Anna Karpuk / Aleksei Khvalko	Alisa Krainyukova / Semyon Netsev

==== Changes to preliminary entries ====
Date	Discipline	Withdrew	Added	Reason/Other notes	Refs
9 December	Women	Alina Gorbacheva	Sofia Akateva	Knee injury; decision of the executive committee of the FSR	
15 December	Women	Sofia Akateva	Maria Mazur	Aftermath of leg injury	

=== Senior results ===
==== Men's singles ====
Rank	Name	Total points	SP		FS	
1	Petr Gumennik	304.95	1	103.77	1	201.18
2	Evgeni Semenenko	296.80	2	100.99	2	195.81
3	Mark Kondratiuk	281.08	10	86.06	3	195.02
4	Matvei Vetlugin	273.12	4	92.76	4	180.36
5	Gleb Lutfullin	266.02	5	90.77	5	175.25
6	Andrei Mozalev	263.17	3	97.16	7	166.01
7	Vladislav Dikidzhi	254.25	9	86.90	6	167.35
8	Artur Danielian	249.28	7	89.17	10	160.11
9	Grigory Fedorov	245.33	13	83.72	8	161.61
10	Nikolai Ugozhaev	245.13	6	89.57	13	155.56
11	Nikita Sarnovskiy	243.26	11	85.31	11	157.95
12	Artem Kovalev	242.96	12	85.03	12	157.93
13	Makar Ignatov	238.47	8	87.52	15	150.95
14	Semyon Soloviev	228.83	14	77.68	14	151.15
15	Damir Cheripka	223.90	15	77.42	16	146.48
16	Roman Savosin	215.42	18	55.17	9	160.25
17	Daniil Samsonov	204.55	16	72.93	17	131.62
18	Aleksandr Melnikov	191.76	17	67.85	18	123.91

==== Women's singles ====
Rank	Name	Total points	SP		FS	
1	Adeliia Petrosian	235.95	1	86.52	2	149.43
2	Alisa Dvoeglazova	227.40	2	74.59	1	152.81
3	Mariia Zakharova	217.73	5	71.37	4	146.36
4	Anna Frolova	217.67	3	73.93	7	143.74
5	Sofia Muravieva	215.74	10	69.23	3	146.51
6	Dina Khusnutdinova	214.96	7	70.62	6	144.34
7	Kamilla Neliubova	214.75	9	69.47	5	145.28
8	Elizaveta Kulikova	206.78	11	68.43	8	138.35
9	Ksenia Gushchina	205.36	6	70.63	10	134.73
10	Anna Lyashenko	202.35	13	67.04	9	135.31
11	Kseniia Sinitsyna	198.46	12	67.96	11	130.50
12	Veronika Yametova	196.26	8	69.98	13	126.28
13	Maria Elisova	194.10	14	65.85	12	128.25
14	Daria Sadkova	188.11	4	73.27	15	114.84
15	Arina Kudlai	187.18	16	60.98	14	126.20
16	Maria Pulina	166.56	17	58.13	17	108.43
17	Eva Zubkova	163.55	18	52.34	16	111.21
18	Maria Mazur	162.03	15	62.93	18	99.10

==== Pair skating ====
Rank	Name	Total points	SP		FS	
1	Aleksandra Boikova / Dmitrii Kozlovskii	224.29	2	77.42	1	146.87
2	Anastasia Mishina / Aleksandr Galliamov	223.63	1	79.03	3	144.60
3	Ekaterina Chikmareva / Matvei Ianchenkov	215.95	4	70.02	2	145.93
4	Iuliia Artemeva / Aleksei Briukhanov	200.71	5	68.90	4	131.81
5	Anastasia Mukhortova / Dmitry Evgenyev	192.65	6	68.75	5	123.90
6	Elizaveta Osokina / Artem Gritsaenko	189.91	3	70.81	6	119.10
7	Taisiia Shcherbinina / Artem Petrov	185.09	7	68.70	9	116.39
8	Valeria Khodykina / Daniil Butenko	178.14	9	61.63	8	116.51
9	Veronika Merenkova / Danil Galimov	176.27	8	65.98	10	110.29
10	Alisa Blinnikova / Aleksei Karpov	171.67	12	53.41	7	118.26
11	Anna Moskaleva / Artem Rodzyanov	167.77	11	57.50	11	110.27
12	Maya Shegay / Andrei Shaderkov	166.21	10	58.19	12	108.02

==== Ice dance ====
Rank	Name	Total points	RD		FD	
1	Alexandra Stepanova / Ivan Bukin	216.94	1	87.45	1	129.49
2	Vasilisa Kaganovskaia / Maxim Nekrasov	211.44	2	84.82	2	126.62
3	Elizaveta Pasechnik / Dario Cirisano	200.63	4	79.37	3	121.26
4	Ekaterina Mironova / Evgenii Ustenko	198.75	3	80.22	4	118.53
5	Anna Shcherbakova / Egor Goncharov	193.22	5	76.76	5	116.46
6	Elizaveta Shichina / Pavel Drozd	190.28	8	75.47	6	114.81
7	Sofia Leontieva / Daniil Gorelkin	190.08	7	75.90	7	114.18
8	Varvara Zhdanova / Timur Babaev-Smirnov	180.42	9	73.02	10	107.40
9	Milana Kuzmina / Dmitrii Studenikin	179.78	10	71.61	8	108.17
10	Ekaterina Rybakova / Ivan Makhnonosov	179.75	6	76.47	11	103.28
11	Anna Kolomenskaya / Artem Frolov	177.82	11	70.03	9	107.79
12	Sofia Shevchenko / Andrei Ezhlov	157.13	14	57.65	12	99.48
13	Taisiia Linchevskaia / Dmitrii Shcherbakov	154.65	13	59.62	13	95.03
14	Alisa Abdullina / Egor Petrov	150.33	15	57.18	14	93.15
15	Olga Fyodorova / Pavel Drako	149.77	12	64.82	15	84.95

== Junior Championships ==
The 2026 Russian Junior Championships (Russian: Первенство России среди юниоров 2026) will be held in Saransk, Mordovia from 4 to 8 February 2026. Qualification was based on results of the All-Russian competitions' series (which were held alongside the Russian Grand Prix series among senior skaters). These junior figure skaters who qualified to the Senior Championships through the Russian Grand Prix series can be included into list of participants without additional qualification. In addition, figure skaters who were included in the official pre-season national team roster but were unable to qualify through the All-Russian competitions' series due to good reasons, also can be included into list of participants by decision of the executive committee of the Figure Skating Federation of Russia.

=== Schedule ===
Listed in local time (UTC+03:00).

Day	Date	Start	Finish	Discipline	Event
Day 1	5 February	14:00	16:20	Women	Short program
Day 1	5 February	16:40	17:10		Opening ceremony
Day 1	5 February	17:10	19:30	Men	Short program
Day 1	5 February	19:45	21:50	Ice dance	Rhythm dance
Day 2	6 February	13:15	15:50	Women	Free skating
Day 2	6 February	16:05	16:15		Victory ceremony
Day 2	6 February	16:15	18:50	Men	Free skating
Day 2	6 February	19:05	19:15		Victory ceremony
Day 2	6 February	19:15	21:05	Pairs	Short program
Day 3	7 February	12:00	14:15	Ice dance	Free dance
Day 3	7 February	14:30	14:40		Victory ceremony
Day 3	7 February	14:40	16:30	Pairs	Free skating
Day 3	7 February	16:45	17:00		Victory ceremony

=== Preliminary entries ===
The Figure Skating Federation of Russia published the official list of participants on 2 February 2026.

Men	Women	Pairs	Ice dance
Lev Lazarev	Sofia Dzepka	Polina Shesheleva / Egor Karnaukhov	Elizaveta Maleina / Matvei Samokhin
Arseny Fedotov	Elena Kostyleva	Zoya Kovyazina / Artemiy Mokhov	Maria Fefelova / Artem Valov
German Lenkov	Sofia Smagina	Kira Domozhirova / Ilya Vegera	Taisiia Sheptalina / Dmitry Pekin
Aldar Sambuev	Victoria Streltsova	Taiisia Guseva / Daniil Ovchinnikov	Zoya Pestova / Sergei Lagutov
Roman Khamzin	Lidia Pleskachova	Polina Sazhina / Aleksei Belkin	Varvara Slutskaya / Gleb Goncharov
Gleb Kovtun	Agata Petrova	Olga Sabada / Pavel Astakhov	Daria Drozhzhina / Ivan Telnov
Aleksandr Semkov	Margarita Bazyliuk	Sofia Diana Cousins / Aleksandr Bregey	Kamilla Sharafutdinova / Rodion Murasalimov
Mark Lukin	Diana Milto	Arina Parsegova / Matvei Bogdanov	Anna Bilibina / Dmitrii Kashaev
Mikhail Aleksakhin	Agata Morozova	Amelia Shayakhmetova / Martin Breslavskiy	Polina Pilipenko / Vladislav Mikhailov
Makar Solodnikov	Elizaveta Labutina	Anastasia Vysotskaya / Pyotr Alekseenko	Polina Tikhonova / Matvei Lysov
Nikolay Kolesnikov	Arina Orekhovskaya	Yulia Filimonova / Ilya Pylnev	Milana Zhabina / Veniamin Bashurov
Artem Fedotov	Maya Sarafanova	~~Zlata Kamalova / Danil Panov~~ (withdrew)	Polina Zharova / Aleksei Stolyarov
Ilyas Khaliullin	Alisa Yurova		Evdokia Kryuchkova / Aleksei Stolyarov
Daniil Zholobov	Arina Parsegova		Anna Soboleva / Matvei Churakov
Ilya Neretin	Sofia Sarnovskaya		Yaroslava Vorobyova / Georgiy Tsymbalov
Nikita Malyutin	Alena Prineva		
Ilya Malkov	Alisa Gorislavskaya		
Daniil Koloskov	Sofia Fedotova		
Substitutes
Eduard Karartynian	Milana Lebedeva	Viktoria Dvinina / Viktor Potapov (added)	Sandra Davydenko / Ignat Pakhomov
Aleksei Pychin	Ekaterina Koltsova	Eva Gude / Andrei Rud	Elizaveta Rostilova / Denis Aurov
Kirill Andreyanov	Amalia Nasybullina	Albina Kamaldinova / Stepan Marishin	Sofia Grabchak / Maksim Poltorak

==== Changes to preliminary entries ====
Date	Discipline	Withdrew	Added	Reason/Other notes	Refs
2 February	Pairs	Zlata Kamalova / Danil Panov	Viktoria Dvinina / Viktor Potapov		

=== Junior results ===
==== Men's singles ====
Rank	Name	Total points	SP		FS	
1	Lev Lazarev	278.23	1	85.88	1	192.35
2	Arseny Fedotov	254.59	2	84.46	2	170.13
3	Gleb Kovtun	247.16	4	80.52	3	166.64
4	German Lenkov	245.19	5	79.99	4	165.20
5	Mark Lukin	236.24	7	76.81	5	159.43
6	Ilyas Khaliullin	227.04	14	71.05	6	155.99
7	Ilya Malkov	225.75	10	73.56	7	152.19
8	Aldar Sambuev	223.35	3	81.97	12	141.38
9	Artem Fedotov	215.04	12	72.88	11	142.16
10	Daniil Koloskov	215.01	9	74.09	13	140.92
11	Aleksandr Semkov	214.82	17	65.84	8	148.98
12	Ilya Neretin	213.19	16	68.22	9	144.97
13	Daniil Zholobov	205.35	6	78.13	16	127.22
14	Mikhail Aleksakhin	205.34	15	68.58	14	136.76
15	Nikita Malyutin	204.73	18	60.98	10	143.75
16	Makar Solodnikov	204.19	11	73.24	15	130.95
17	Roman Khamzin	201.44	8	75.18	17	126.26
18	Nikolay Kolesnikov	183.75	13	71.75	18	112.00

==== Women's singles ====
Rank	Name	Total points	SP		FS	
1	Elena Kostyleva	228.53	1	71.16	1	157.37
2	Lidia Pleskachova	218.03	2	70.96	3	147.07
3	Victoria Streltsova	217.84	5	68.59	2	149.25
4	Sofia Dzepka	205.32	16	60.54	4	144.78
5	Margarita Bazyliuk	204.28	4	68.67	5	135.61
6	Agata Petrova	197.78	3	68.75	7	129.03
7	Alena Prineva	192.09	6	66.67	9	125.42
8	Arina Orekhovskaya	190.74	10	62.75	8	127.99
9	Sofia Smagina	190.55	17	56.39	6	134.16
10	Sofia Sarnovskaya	183.34	7	66.07	12	117.27
11	Elizaveta Labutina	181.10	12	62.17	11	118.93
12	Diana Milto	178.36	14	61.47	13	116.89
13	Arina Parsegova	177.77	18	54.88	10	122.89
14	Sofia Fedotova	175.76	8	64.30	17	111.46
15	Alisa Yurova	175.49	9	63.62	16	111.87
16	Alisa Gorislavskaya	175.28	11	62.32	15	112.96
17	Maya Sarafanova	174.69	15	61.29	14	113.40
18	Agata Morozova	172.44	13	62.14	18	110.30

==== Pair skating ====
Rank	Name	Total points	SP		FS	
1	Polina Shesheleva / Egor Karnaukhov	190.12	1	69.67	2	120.45
2	Polina Sazhina / Aleksei Belkin	187.47	4	63.07	1	124.40
3	Taiisia Guseva / Daniil Ovchinnikov	186.61	3	67.55	4	119.06
4	Olga Sabada / Pavel Astakhov	182.70	2	68.13	5	114.57
5	Arina Parsegova / Matvei Bogdanov	179.82	6	60.74	3	119.08
6	Sofia Diana Cousins / Aleksandr Bregey	171.22	5	62.56	7	108.66
7	Kira Domozhirova / Ilya Vegera	167.26	7	60.58	8	106.68
8	Viktoria Dvinina / Viktor Potapov	166.15	12	55.52	6	110.63
9	Anastasia Vysotskaya / Pyotr Alekseenko	161.47	9	57.57	9	103.90
10	Amelia Shayakhmetova / Martin Breslavskiy	156.89	11	55.56	10	101.33
11	Zoya Kovyazina / Artemiy Mokhov	153.84	8	59.11	12	94.73
12	Yulia Filimonova / Ilya Pylnev	151.35	10	56.08	11	95.27

==== Ice dance ====
Rank	Name	Total points	RD		FD	
1	Maria Fefelova / Artem Valov	178.62	1	73.23	1	105.39
2	Zoya Pestova / Sergei Lagutov	174.66	2	71.28	2	103.38
3	Elizaveta Maleina / Matvei Samokhin	170.40	3	68.90	3	101.50
4	Varvara Slutskaya / Gleb Goncharov	165.27	5	66.71	4	98.56
5	Polina Pilipenko / Vladislav Mikhailov	164.62	4	67.30	5	97.32
6	Daria Drozhzhina / Ivan Telnov	162.52	7	65.32	6	97.20
7	Anna Bilibina / Dmitrii Kashaev	161.39	6	65.77	7	95.62
8	Taisiia Sheptalina / Dmitry Pekin	159.19	9	63.57	8	95.62
9	Milana Zhabina / Veniamin Bashurov	158.25	8	63.76	10	94.49
10	Polina Zharova / Aleksei Stolyarov	157.56	10	63.06	9	94.50
11	Evdokia Kryuchkova / Aleksei Stolyarov	153.42	11	62.97	11	90.45
12	Polina Tikhonova / Matvei Lysov	149.49	13	61.18	13	88.31
13	Anna Soboleva / Matvei Churakov	147.14	15	58.15	12	88.99
14	Yaroslava Vorobyova / Georgiy Tsymbalov	145.38	14	58.69	14	86.69
15	Kamilla Sharafutdinova / Rodion Murasalimov	144.87	12	61.49	15	83.38

== International team selections ==
=== Olympic Qualifying Competition ===
Commonly referred to as "Skate to Milano", the Olympic Qualifying Competition was held in Beijing, China from 18 to 21 September 2025. However, on 28 February 2022, the International Olympic Committee (IOC) recommended sports federations to ban Russian athletes and officials from participating in international tournaments due to the 2022 Russian invasion of Ukraine. On 12 October 2023, the International Olympic Committee (IOC) announced the suspension of the membership of the Russian Olympic Committee (ROC) with immediate effect. But on 20 December 2024, the International Skating Union (ISU) allowed limited number of Russian skaters to participate in the Olympic Qualifying Competition under strict conditions as the "Individual Neutral Athletes (AINs)". According to these conditions, by the lattest 28 February 2025, the Figure Skating Federation of Russia (FSR) was permitted to nominate one skater or team in each of four disciplines (as well as one substitute for each skater or team in case of injury only prior to qualification) to complete at the Skate to Milano as a means to qualify for the 2026 Winter Olympics. Each nominee (including substitutes) was required to pass a special screening process to assess whether they had displayed any active support for the Russian invasion of Ukraine or any contractual links to the Russian or Belarusian military or other national security agencies (without possibility for substitution for athletes who failed to meet the eligibility criteria). In February 2025, the FSR nominated skaters and their substitutes without official public announcement. On 13 May 2025, the ISU announced names of Russian skaters who had been approved to complete as Individual Neutral Athletes (AINs). It was announced that all Russian nominees for men's and women's single skating were approved to complete while Russian nominees for Pairs and Ice dance events failed to meet neutrality criteria, and their designated substitutes were also deemed ineligible, as substitutions were permitted only in case of injury, not on grounds of ineligibility.

	Men	Women	Pairs	Ice dancing
1	Petr Gumennik	Adeliia Petrosian	~~Anastasia Mishina / Aleksandr Galliamov~~ (not allowed)	~~Alexandra Stepanova / Ivan Bukin~~ (not allowed)
Alt.	Vladislav Dikidzhi	Alina Gorbacheva	~~Aleksandra Boikova / Dmitrii Kozlovskii~~ (not allowed)	~~Vasilisa Kaganovskaia / Maxim Nekrasov~~ (not allowed)

=== European Championships ===
The 2026 European Championships were held in Sheffield, Great Britain from 13 to 18 January 2026. However, on 1 March 2022, in accordance with a recommendation by the International Olympic Committee (IOC), the International Skating Union (ISU) banned figure skaters and officials from Russia from attending all international competitions due to the 2022 Russian invasion of Ukraine.

=== Winter Olympics ===
The 2026 Winter Olympics were held in Milan, Italy from 6 to 21 February 2026. However, on 28 February 2022, the International Olympic Committee (IOC) recommended sports federations to ban Russian athletes and officials from participating in international tournaments due to the 2022 Russian invasion of Ukraine. On 12 October 2023, the International Olympic Committee (IOC) announced the suspension of the membership of the Russian Olympic Committee (ROC) with immediate effect. But on 20 December 2024, the International Skating Union (ISU) allowed limited number of Russian skaters to participate in the Olympic Qualifying Competition under strict conditions as the "Individual Neutral Athletes (AINs)". In September 2025 Petr Gumennik and Adeliia Petrosian won the men's and women's events respectively at the Olympic Qualifying Competition and therefore qualified for the 2026 Winter Olympics (without possibility for substition with other Russian skaters).

	Men	Women
1	Petr Gumennik	Adeliia Petrosian

=== World Junior Championships ===
Commonly referred to as "Junior Worlds", the 2026 World Junior Championships were held in Tallinn, Estonia from 3 to 8 March 2026. However, on 1 March 2022, in accordance with a recommendation by the International Olympic Committee (IOC), the International Skating Union (ISU) banned figure skaters and officials from Russia from attending all international competitions due to the 2022 Russian invasion of Ukraine.

=== World Championships ===
The 2026 World Championships were held in Prague, Czech Republic from 24 to 29 March 2026. However, on 1 March 2022, in accordance with a recommendation by the International Olympic Committee (IOC), the International Skating Union (ISU) banned figure skaters and officials from Russia from attending all international competitions due to the 2022 Russian invasion of Ukraine.
