= Nelyubov =

Nelyubov (Russian: Нелюбов) is a Russian-language surname. The feminine form of this name is Nelyubova (Russian: Нелюбова).

== People ==
- Grigori Nelyubov (1934–1966), Soviet cosmonaut
- Olga Nelyubova (born 1964), Russian middle-distance runner
- Kamilla Neliubova (born 2008), Russian figure skater
