= Daria Sadkova =

Russian figure skater

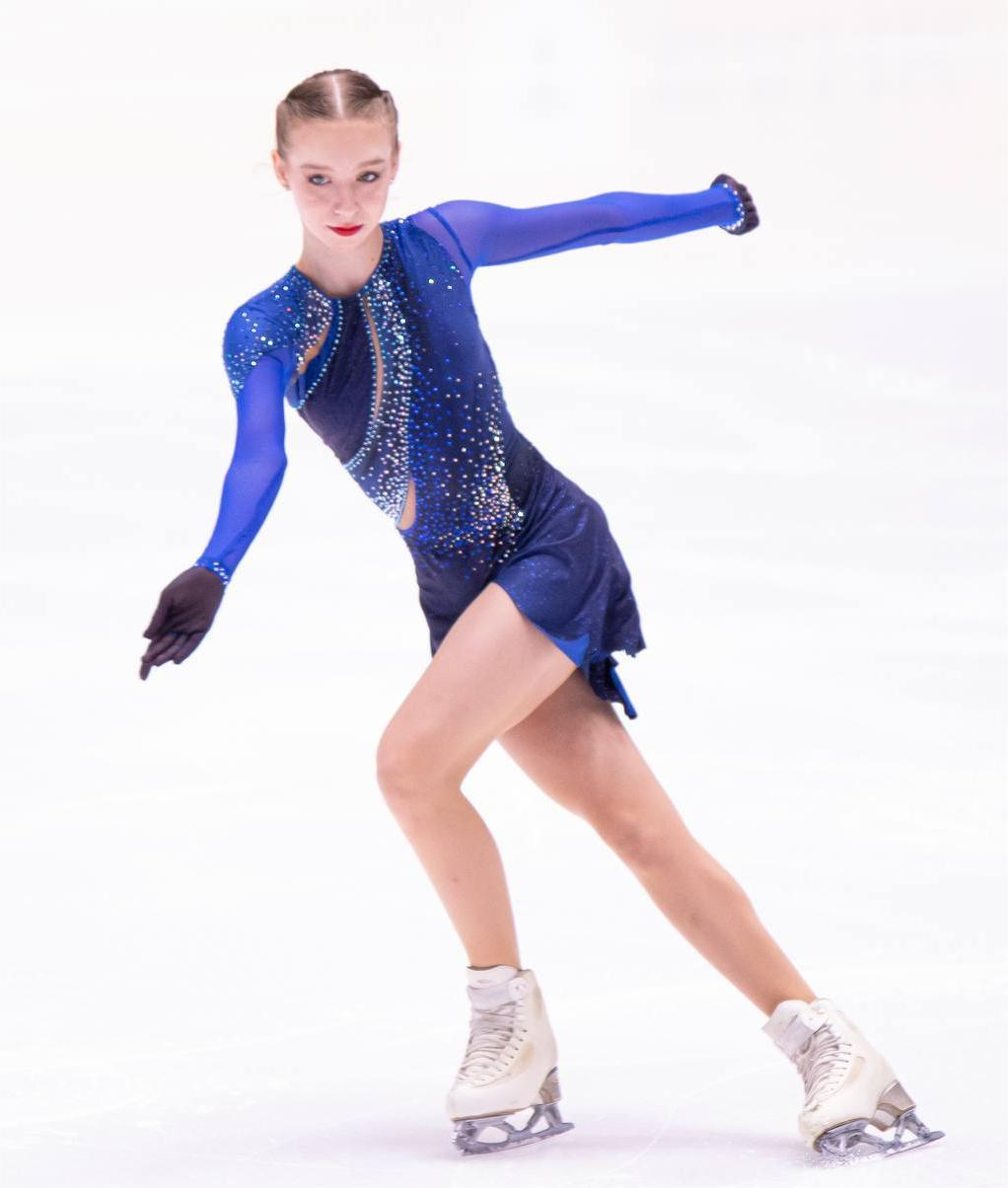
- Sadkova in 2024

Personal information
- Native name: Дарья Андреевна Садкова (Russian)
- Full name: Daria Andreevna Sadkova
- Other names: Dasha
- Born: 26 June 2008 (age 18) Yoshkar-Ola, Russia
- Height: 1.45 m (4 ft 9 in)

Figure skating career
- Country: (Individual Neutral Athletes) Individual Neutral Athlete; Russia
- Discipline: Women's singles
- Coach: Eteri Tutberidze; Sergei Dudakov; Daniil Gleikhengauz
- Skating club: Sambo-70
- Began skating: 2013

Medal record
Russian Championships
Silver medal – second place	2025 Omsk	Singles

Daria Andreevna Sadkova (Russian: Дарья Андреевна Садкова; born 26 June 2008) is a Russian figure skater who currently competes as an Individual Neutral Athlete. She is the 2025 Russian national silver medalist and the 2026 Russian Grand Prix final silver medalist.

== Early and personal life ==
Sadkova was born on 26 June 2008 in Yoshkar-Ola. Her mother, Anna, is a former lawyer who quit her job to move with her daughter to Moscow for figure skating. She has a younger brother Prokhor who is an artistic gymnast.

== Career ==
Sadkova began figure skating in 2013 in Yoshkar-Ola under coaches Oksana Nizova, Olga Yazkova, and Lyudmila Skvortsova. She then moved to Moscow to train under Mikhail Magerovski at the CSKA club. She was accepted into Eteri Tutberidze's training group at the Sambo 70 skating club in 2020. She missed most of the 2021–22 season due to an injury.

=== 2022–23 season ===
Sadkova competed at the 2023 Russian Junior Championships and finished second in the short program behind Alina Gorbacheva. However, she only finished 14th in the free skate and dropped to eighth overall. She then competed at the Russian Cup Final and won the short program with a personal best score of 72.61. She then placed third in the free skate after falling twice and received the silver medal behind Veronika Zhilina.

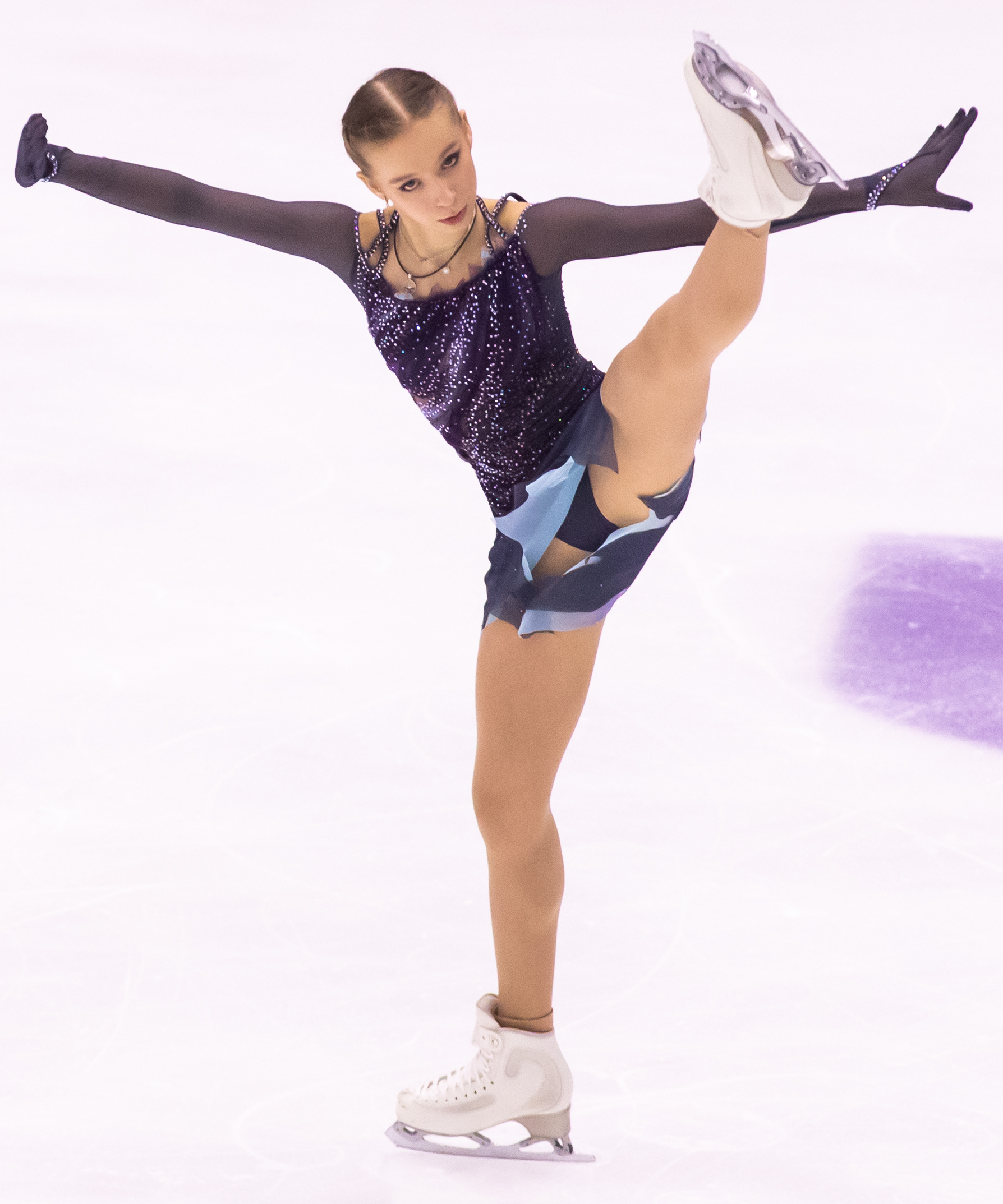
Daria at the 2023 Russian GP Stage 4

=== 2023–24 season ===
Sadkova began competing at senior domestic competitions during the 2023–24 season. She won a bronze medal at the fourth stage of the Russian Grand Prix, behind Sofia Muravieva and Alina Gorbacheva. Then at the fifth stage of the Russian Grand Prix, she won the silver medal behind Kseniia Sinitsyna. At her first senior Russian Championships, she finished in eighth place after mistakes in the short program. She then placed fifth in the Russian Cup Final.

=== 2024–25 season: National silver medal ===
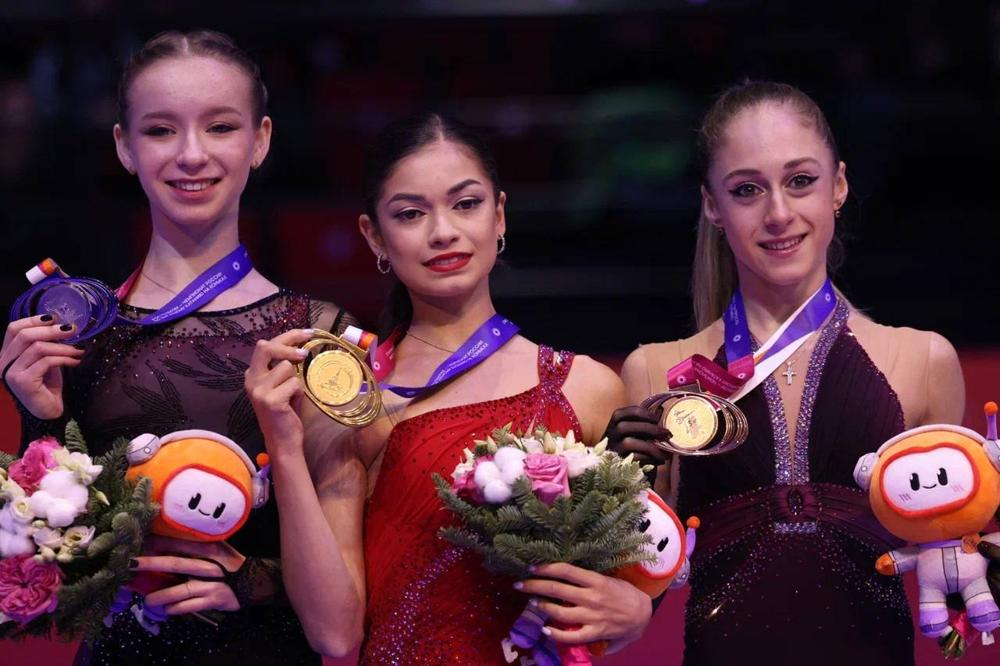
Daria alongside fellow medalists Adeliia Petrosian (middle) and Alina Gorbacheva (right) at the 2025 Russian Figure Skating Championships.

Sadkova won the bronze medal at the second stage of the Russian Grand Prix. She then won the silver medal at the fourth stage of the Russian Grand Prix, behind Adeliia Petrosian, after performing two clean quadruple toe loops in the free skate. At the Russian Championships, she crashed into the side of the rink and fell during the short program, finishing fifth. She then jumped up the rankings to win the silver medal behind Petrosian after performing two clean quadruple toe loops in the free skate. She then finished sixth at the Russian Cup Final after falling on a quadruple toe loop and a triple Lutz in the free skate.

=== 2025–26 season ===
Daria was assigned to two stages of the Russian Grand Prix. She won the gold medal in Omsk, and silver in Kazan. In December, at the 2026 Russian Championships, despite finishing 4th in the short program, Daria dropped to 14th overall after struggling in the free skate segment. Following nationals, Daria shared she had ongoing injuries in her leg and foot. At the Russian Jumping Championship in February, she reported to have re-injured the same leg while attempting a quadruple jump.

In early March, Daria placed second and won the silver medal at the 2026 Russian Grand Prix final, behind Alisa Dvoeglazova and ahead of Kamilla Neliubova.

=== 2026–27 season ===
On 30 June 2026, the International Skating Union announced that figure skaters from Russia and Belarus would be allowed to compete at international competitions as Individual Neutral Athletes (AINs). Each of these skaters are be required to undergo an individual assessment conducted by the ISU Council to determine whether they meet the criteria for neutral status. Sadkova's application was approved, making her eligible to compete internationally as a neutral athlete.

Sadkova opened the new season competing on the Russian Grand Prix series. Competing at stages four and five, Sadkova placed twelfth and sixth respectively.

== Programs ==
Season	Short program	Free skating	Exhibition
2026–27	Honeymoon by Lana Del Rey; Doechii (Runway) by Lady Gaga	Lion; The Power of One; Circle of Life composed by Hans Zimmer	
2025–26	Disfruto by Carla Morrison; La Mordidita by Ricky Martin	Warriors by 2WEI, Edda Hayes, League of Legends; Balder by Power-Haus	
2024–25	The House of the Rising Sun by The Animals performed by Haley Reinhart	Je t'aime performed by Lara Fabian	Hello; Someone like You; Rolling in the Deep performed by Adele
2023–24	Bring Me to Life performed by Evanescence	Hello; Someone like You; Rolling in the Deep performed by Adele	
2022–23	Concerto pour une voix by Franck Pourcel	Unchained Melody (Dance) / The Love Inside (from the Ghost soundtrack)	
2021–22	Be Italian (from Nine) performed by Fergie	Unchained Melody (Dance) / The Love Inside (from the Ghost soundtrack)	
2020–21	Be Italian (from Nine) performed by Fergie	Goodbye; Dance Rehearsal by Jan Kaczmarek	
2019–20	Big God performed by Florence and the Machine	Goodbye; Dance Rehearsal by Jan Kaczmarek	
2018–19		Fetch by Jan Kaczmarek	

== Competitive highlights ==
GP: Grand Prix; JGP: Junior Grand Prix; CS: ISU Challenger Series

National
Event	20–21	21–22	22–23	23–24	24–25	25–26
Russian Champ.				8th	2nd	14th
Russian Cup (Final)			2nd J.	5th		2nd
Russian Junior Champ.			2nd			
Team events
Channel One Trophy				1st		

== Detailed results ==
=== Skating for Russia ===
Results in the 2025–26 season
Date	Event	SP		FS		Total	
Date	Event	P	Score	P	Score	P	Score
Dec. 17–22, 2025	(Russia) 2026 Russian Figure Skating Championships	4	73.27	15	114.84	14	188.11

Results in the 2024–25 season
Date	Event	SP		FS		Total	
Date	Event	P	Score	P	Score	P	Score
Dec. 18–23, 2024	(Russia) 2025 Russian Figure Skating Championships	5	73.15	2	161.54	2	234.69

Results in the 2023–24 season
Date	Event	SP		FS		Total	
Date	Event	P	Score	P	Score	P	Score
Dec. 20–25, 2023	(Russia) 2024 Russian Figure Skating Championships	14	64.22	4	150.43	8	214.65
