= Alina Gorbacheva =

Russian figure skater

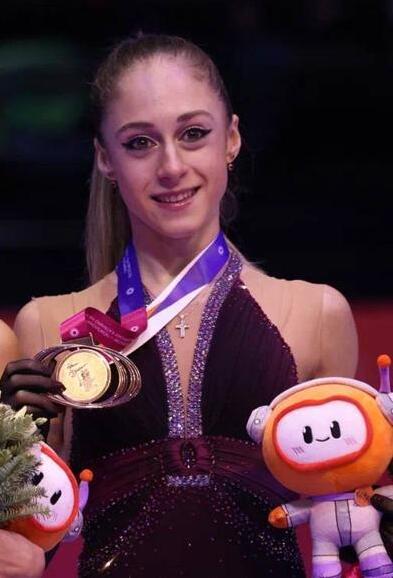
- Gorbacheva at the 2025 Russian Championships

Personal information
- Native name: Алина Дмитриевна Горбачёва
- Full name: Alina Dmitrievna Gorbacheva
- Born: 23 July 2007 (age 19) Krasnodar, Russia
- Home town: Khimki, Russia
- Height: 155 cm (5 ft 1 in)

Figure skating career
- Country: (Individual Neutral Athletes) Individual Neutral Athlete; Russia
- Discipline: Women's singles
- Coach: Sofia Fedchenko; Vlada Danilkina
- Skating club: Tamara Moskvina Figure Skating Club
- Began skating: 2014

Medal record
Russian Championships
Bronze medal – third place	2025 Omsk	Singles

Alina Dmitrievna Gorbacheva (Russian: Алина Дмитриевна Горбачёва; born 23 July 2007) is a Russian figure skater who currently competes as an Individual Neutral Athlete. She is the 2025 Russian national bronze medalist and the 2023 Russian junior national champion.

== Personal life ==
Gorbacheva was born on 23 July 2007 in Krasnodar, Russia. Since the age of nine, she has lived with her figure skating coach, Sofia Fedchenko, in Moscow, while her family remains in her hometown of Tver.

On August 29, 2023, Gorbacheva was reported missing after not returning home following a training session at Chkalov Arena in Moscow. Having gotten in a fight with Fedchenko, Gorbacheva left the rink with a phone, tablet, dark blue backpack, and about 20 thousand rubles in cash. She first headed in the direction of St Vladimir's Church before walking through a park, where her trail disappeared. As a result, law enforcement agencies as well as a Liza Alert search and rescue team were called up to aid in the search efforts for Gorbacheva. The following day, she was caught on a surveillance camera at a bread store and was found at a shopping center movie theater that same evening. During an interrogation with the Investigative Committee of Russia, she shared that she had spent the night on the stairs of a residential building. Gorbacheva was ultimately sent home after it was determined that she was healthy and not in any immediate danger.

In addition to figure skating, Gorbacheva also enjoys horseback riding. She looks up to Anna Shcherbakova as a role model.

== Career ==
=== Early career ===
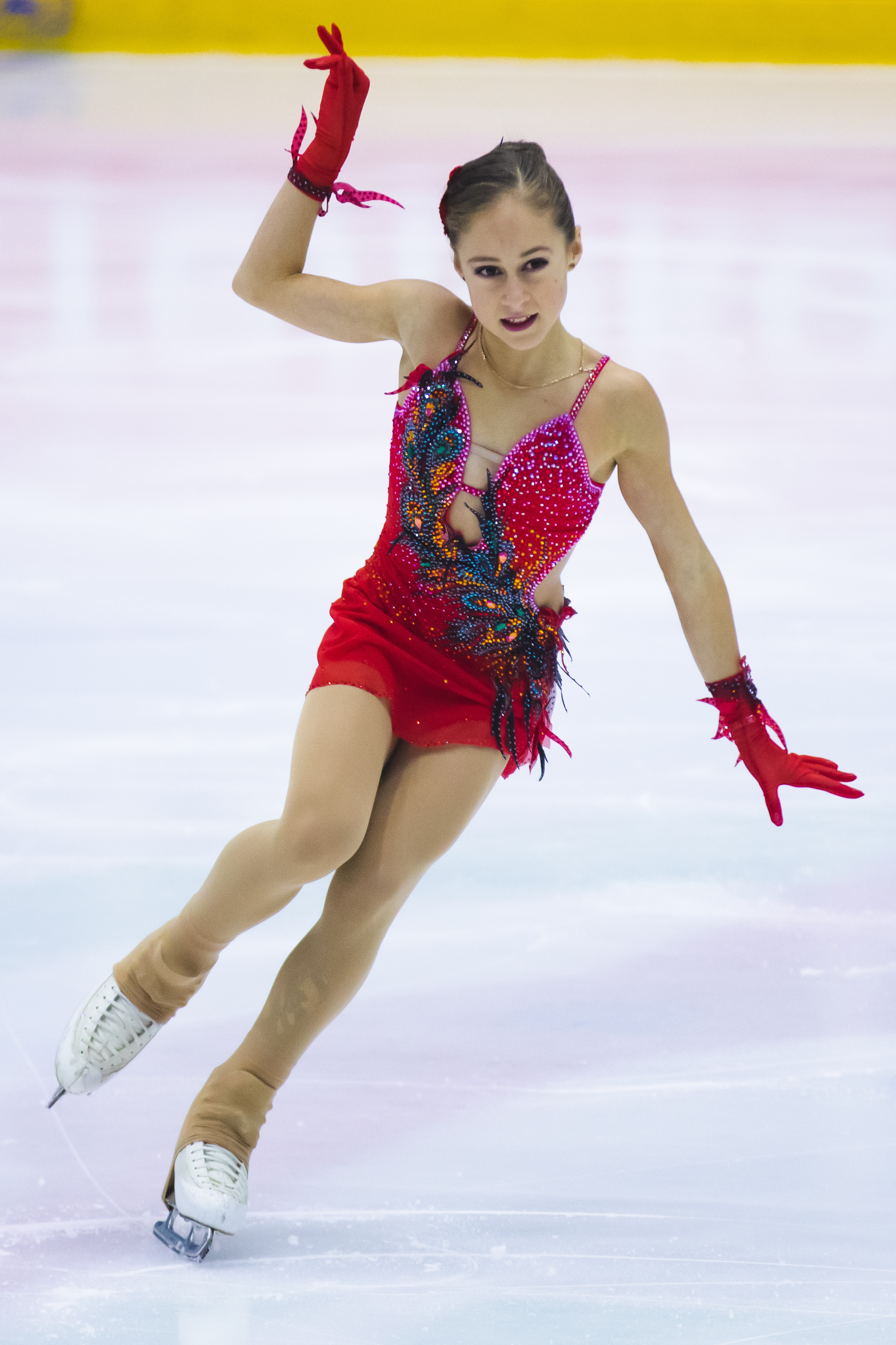
Gorbacheva at the 2020 Russian Cup

Gorbacheva began figure skating in 2014 at the age of six and a half in Krasnodar. There, she was initially coached by Oksana Grishchenko before switching to Vitaly Malakhov following Grishchenko's maternity leave. One day, while Malakhov needed to travel with his other skaters to a competition, he asked his colleague, Sofia Fedchenko to work with Gorbacheva while he was gone. During this time, Gorbacheva decided that she enjoyed working with Fedchenko and wished to continue doing so. Thus, Gorbacheva and her family moved to Tver so that she could begin training at the SShOR Skating Club, where Fedchenko coached at the time.

When Gorbacheva was nine years old, Fedchenko relocated to Moscow to begin coaching at the Triumph Academy. As a result, her parents made arrangements for Gorbacheva to move there and live with Fedchenko.

As an advanced novice skater, Gorbacheva competed at the 2019 Santa Claus Cup, where she won the gold medal. She subsequently went on to win silver at the 2021 Russian Novice Championships and bronze at the 2022 Russian Novice Championships.

=== 2022–23 season: Junior Russian national champion ===
Due to the Russian invasion of Ukraine, the International Skating Union banned the participation of Russian and Belarusian figure skaters at international competitions. Thus, Gorbecheva was only able to compete at domestic events.

Moving up to the senior level, Gorbacheva began the season by finishing fourth at the 2022 Russian Grand Prix I, Moscow and winning the bronze medal at the 2022 Russian Grand Prix VI, Perm. She then went on to make her senior national debut at the 2023 Russian Championships, finishing in eighth place.

The following month, Gorbacheva competed on the junior level at the 2023 Russian Championships. Gorbacheva skated a clean short program and ranked in first place, 3.05 points ahead of Daria Sadkova. In the free skate Gorbacheva successfully landed her opening quadruple Salchow and skated the rest of the program cleanly. She placed second in that competition segment and first overall, winning the gold medal ahead of Veronika Zhilina and Maria Gordeeva.

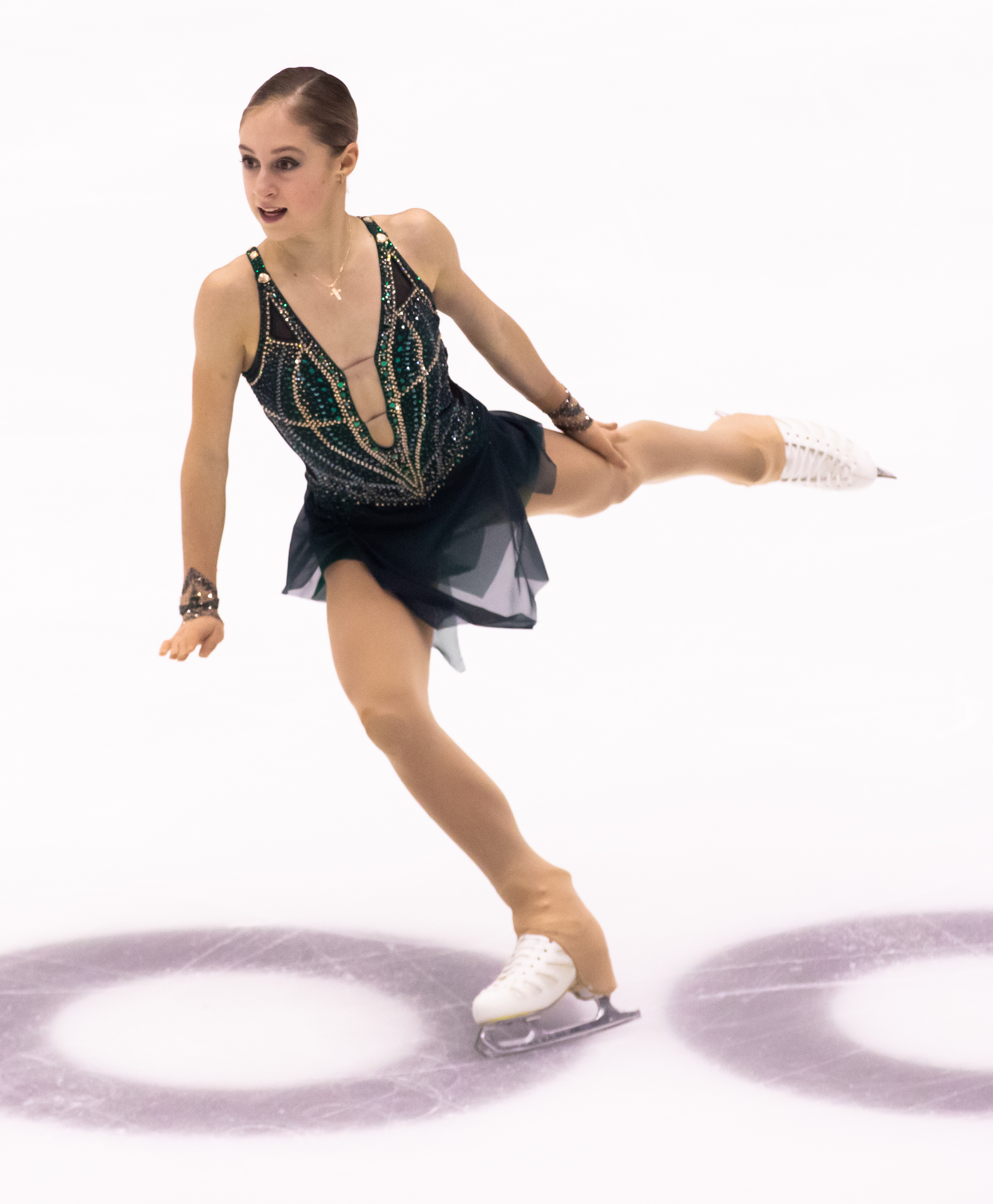
Gorbacheva at the 2023 Russian Grand Prix Stage 3.

She then closed the season by finishing sixth at the 2023 Russian Grand Prix Final.

=== 2023–24 season ===
Gorbacheva started off by winning silver at the 2023 Russian Grand Prix II, Omsk and at the 2023 Russian Grand Prix IV, Kazan. She then went on to place sixth at the 2024 Russian Championships.

She ultimately finished the season by placing fourth at the 2024 Russian Grand Prix Final.

=== 2024–25 season: National bronze medal ===
Assigned to compete at the 2025 Russian Grand Prix III, Krasnoyarsk and the 2024 Russian Grand Prix V, St. Petersburg, Gorbacheva won silver and gold, respectively. In December, at the 2025 Russian Championships, Gorbacheva placed second in the short program and sixth in the free skate, winning the bronze medal overall behind Adeliia Petrosian and Daria Sadkova.

Two months later, Gorbacheva won the silver medal at the 2025 Russian Grand Prix Final behind Petrosian.

=== 2025–26 season: Olympic alternate & Injury ===
In May 2025, the International Skating Union announced that Gorbacheva and Adeliia Petrosian had both been approved as Individual Neutral Athletes (AIN). Petrosian will be able to compete at the 2025 ISU Olympic Qualifying Competition to vie for a spot to compete at the 2026 Winter Olympics, while Gorbacheva is the reserve.

In the same month, it was reported that Gorbacheva would no longer represent her long-time base of Tver but would instead represent St. Petersburg and skate for Tamara Moskvina's club. The news stated that the parting was amicable. Initially, Gorbacheva and her team were offered an opportunity to train in her hometown in Krasnodar Krai but they ultimately chose to train in Khimki near Moscow instead.

She began her season in November by winning silver at the 2025 Russian Grand Prix IV, Moscow and bronze at the 2025 Russian Grand Prix V, Omsk. Alina withdrew from the 2026 Russian Championships due to a knee injury. She sought treatment and knee surgery in Germany, with an expected six to ten-month recovery period.

=== 2026–27 season ===
Gorbacheva confirmed that she had recovered from surgery and had returned to training. "A new season is ahead, and finally, an international one. There is so much to look forward to. I hope my recovery keeps moving this well, and very soon I’ll be back with my triples, quads, and big goals" she shares.

On 30 June 2026, the International Skating Union announced that figure skaters from Russia and Belarus would be allowed to compete at international competitions as Individual Neutral Athletes (AINs). Each of these skaters are be required to undergo an individual assessment conducted by the ISU Council to determine whether they meet the criteria for neutral status. Gorbacheva's application was approved, making her eligible to compete internationally as a neutral athlete.

Gorbacheva made her senior international debut at the 2026 CS Budapest Trophy. She won the competition and secured the gold medal.

Gorbacheva's results from the Budapest Trophy named her to the Grand Prix alternate list. She was assigned to the 2026 NHK Trophy following Olivia Lisko's withdrawal.

== Programs ==
Season	Short program	Free skating	Exhibition
2026–2027	Moonlight Sonata by Ludwig van Beethoven performed by Jennifer Thomas & Viktoria Tocca; Moonlight Sonata by Ludwig van Beethoven performed by Laura Wright choreo. by Sergei Rozanov	Notre Dame de Paris by Riccardo Cocciante & Luc Plamondon; Le temps des cathédrales; Les sans-papiers performed by I Fiamminghi & Rudolf Werthen; Ave Maria païen performed by Hélène Ségara; Danse mon Esmeralda performed by I Fiamminghi & Rudolf Werthen choreo. by Sergei Rozanov	
2025–2026	Moonlight Sonata by Ludwig van Beethoven performed by Jennifer Thomas & Viktoria Tocca; Moonlight Sonata by Ludwig van Beethoven performed by Laura Wright choreo. by Sergei Rozanov	Notre Dame de Paris by Riccardo Cocciante & Luc Plamondon; Le temps des cathédrales; Les sans-papiers performed by I Fiamminghi & Rudolf Werthen; Ave Maria païen performed by Hélène Ségara; Danse mon Esmeralda performed by I Fiamminghi & Rudolf Werthen choreo. by Sergei Rozanov	
2024–2025	Madness by Ruelle; Bad to the Bone by George Thorogood performed by 2WEI & Bri Bryant choreo. by Sergei Komolov	Writing's on the Wall (from Spectre) by Sam Smith performed by Tika Shizovokills; The World Is Not Enough (from The World Is Not Enough) by Garbage choreo. by Nikita Mikhailov	Королева мира (Queen of the World); Танго Шапокляк (Shapoklyak’s Tango) by Lada Maris
2023–2024	Desert Moonlight by Andrea Krux; Egyptian in the Night by Nuttin' But Stringz choreo. by Sergei Komolov	La terre vue du ciel by Armand Amar; The Final Game by Jichan Park choreo. by Nikita Mikhailov	
2022–2023	Call Me Cruella (from Cruella) by Florence and the Machine choreo. by Nikita Mikhailov, Vlada Danilkina	Girl in the Mirror by Jennifer Thomas; Hurt by Christina Aguilera choreo. by Nikita Mikhailov, Vlada Danilkina	Спи мой воробушек (Sleep My Sparrow) by Alsou performed by Evgeniya Ryabtseva
2021–2022	Je me souviens by Lara Fabian choreo. by Nikita Mikhailov	The Firebird by Igor Stravinsky choreo. by Nikita Mikhailov	
2019–2020	Cell Block Tango (from Chicago) by John Kander; Assassin's Tango (from Mr. and Mrs. Smith) by John Powell choreo. by Nikita Mikhailov	God Particle; 503 (from Angels & Demons) by Hans Zimmer; Mind Heist (from Inception) by Zack Hemsey choreo. by Nikita Mikhailov	

== Competitive highlights ==
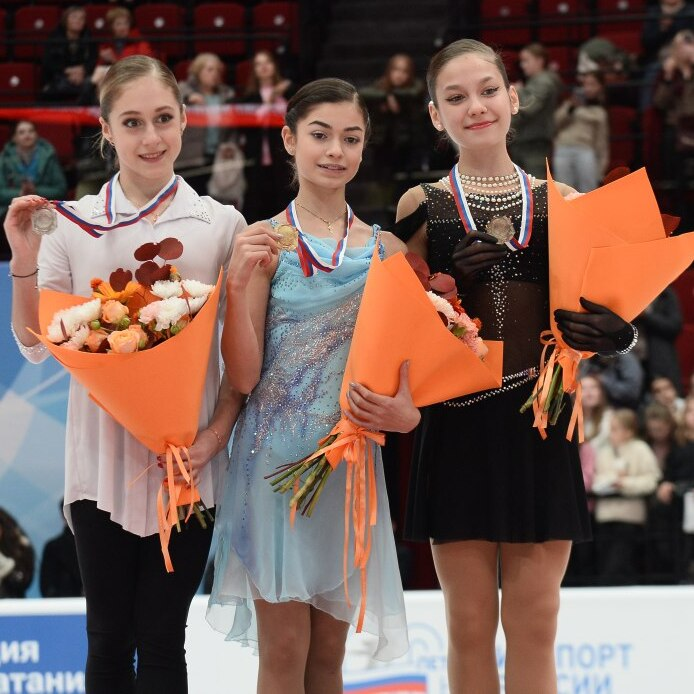
2023 Russian Grand Prix II, Omsk medal ceremony; Adeliia Petrosian (center), Gorbacheva (left), Maria Agaeva (right)

- GP – Event of the ISU Grand Prix Series
- CS – Event of the ISU Challenger Series
- TBD – Placement to be decided
- WD – Withdrew

=== Skating as an Individual Neutral Athlete ===
Competition placements at senior level
Season	2026–27
GP NHK Trophy	TBD
CS Budapest Trophy	1st

=== Skating for Russia ===
Competition placements at senior level
Season	2022–23	2023–24	2024–25	2025–26
Russian Championships	9th	7th	3rd	
Russian GP Final (Note: The 2023 Russian Cup Final was renamed as the 2023 Russian Grand Prix Final.)	6th	4th	2nd	
Russian GP Stage 1 (Note: In 2022, the Russian Cup Stages were renamed to Russian Grand Prix Stages.)	4th			
Russian GP Stage 2		2nd		
Russian GP Stage 3			2nd	
Russian GP Stage 4		2nd		2nd
Russian GP Stage 5			1st	3rd
Russian GP Stage 6	3rd			

Competition placements at junior level
Season	2019–20	2020–21	2021–22	2022–23
Russian Championships	12th		7th	1st
Russian Cup Final	11th		11th	
Russian GP Stage 1				
Russian GP Stage 2	2nd		1st	
Russian GP Stage 3				
Russian GP Stage 4		3rd	1st	
Russian GP Stage 5	4th	WD		

== Detailed results ==
ISU personal best scores in the +5/-5 GOE System
Segment	Type	Score	Event
Total	TSS	203.35	2026 CS Budapest Trophy
Short program	TSS	73.02	2026 CS Budapest Trophy
Short program	TES	41.03	2026 CS Budapest Trophy
Short program	PCS	31.99	2026 CS Budapest Trophy
Free skating	TSS	130.33	2026 CS Budapest Trophy
Free skating	TES	67.52	2026 CS Budapest Trophy
Free skating	PCS	63.81	2026 CS Budapest Trophy

=== Skating as an Individual Neutral Athlete ===
Results in the 2026–27 season
Date	Event	SP		FS		Total	
Date	Event	P	Score	P	Score	P	Score
15–18 Oct 2026	(Hungary) 2026 CS Budapest Trophy	1	73.02	1	130.33	1	203.35

=== Skating for Russia ===
Results in the 2022–23 season
Date	Event	SP		FS		Total	
Date	Event	P	Score	P	Score	P	Score
21–24 Oct 2022	(Russia) 2022 Russian Grand Prix I, Moscow	4	66.87	6	122.47	4	189.34
28–30 Nov 2022	(Russia) 2022 Russian Grand Prix VI, Perm	4	65.43	3	145.43	3	210.86
20–26 Dec 2022	(Russia) 2023 Russian Championships	13	67.22	7	142.00	9	209.22
3–5 Mar 2023	(Russia) 2023 Russian Grand Prix Final	6	73.69	5	155.16	6	228.85

Results in the 2023–24 season
Date	Event	SP		FS		Total	
Date	Event	P	Score	P	Score	P	Score
21–22 Oct 2023	(Russia) 2023 Russian Grand Prix II, Omsk	1	75.89	4	129.82	2	205.71
10–13 Nov 2023	(Russia) 2023 Russian Grand Prix IV, Kazan	3	73.29	2	145.73	2	219.02
20–24 Dec 2023	(Russia) 2024 Russian Championships	7	72.09	7	142.78	7	214.87
14–19 Feb 2024	(Russia) 2024 Russian Grand Prix Final	4	74.11	4	145.40	4	219.51

Results in the 2024–25 season
Date	Event	SP		FS		Total	
Date	Event	P	Score	P	Score	P	Score
8–11 Nov 2024	(Russia) 2024 Russian Grand Prix III, Krasnoyarsk	6	63.06	1	147.30	2	210.36
22–25 Nov 2024	(Russia) 2024 Russian Grand Prix V, Saint Petersburg	2	71.32	1	163.26	1	234.58
18–23 Dec 2024	(Russia) 2025 Russian Championships	2	77.57	6	146.35	3	223.92
13–17 Feb 2025	(Russia) 2025 Russian Grand Prix Final	2	76.76	2	147.60	2	224.36

Results in the 2025–26 season
Date	Event	SP		FS		Total	
Date	Event	P	Score	P	Score	P	Score
14–17 Nov 2025	(Russia) 2025 Russian Grand Prix IV, Moscow	2	68.86	2	140.42	2	209.28
21–24 Nov 2025	(Russia) 2025 Russian Grand Prix V, Omsk	1	73.08	3	142.52	3	215.60

=== Junior level ===
Results in the 2019–20 season
Date	Event	SP		FS		Total	
Date	Event	P	Score	P	Score	P	Score
9–13 Oct 2019	(Russia) 2019 Russian Cup Stage II, Saransk	5	62.02	2	127.03	2	189.05
20–24 Nov 2019	(Russia) 2019 Russian Cup Stage V, Moscow	4	64.84	4	118.90	4	183.74
4–8 Feb 2020	(Russia) 2020 Russian Junior Championships	13	63.64	12	121.36	12	185.00
18–22 Feb 2020	(Russia) 2020 Russian Cup Final	8	64.51	12	108.59	11	173.10

Results in the 2020–21 season
Date	Event	SP		FS		Total	
Date	Event	P	Score	P	Score	P	Score
8–12 Nov 2020	(Russia) 2020 Russian Grand Prix IV, Kazan	4	64.91	2	128.77	3	193.68
5–8 Dec 2020	(Russia) 2020 Russian Grand Prix V, Moscow	11	54.48	WD	—N/a	WD	—N/a

Results in the 2021–22 season
Date	Event	SP		FS		Total	
Date	Event	P	Score	P	Score	P	Score
10–14 Oct 2021	(Russia) 2021 Russian Cup Stage II, Yoshkar-Ola	2	67.56	1	132.32	1	199.88
8–12 Nov 2021	(Russia) 2021 Russian Cup Stage IV, Kazan	1	70.52	3	128.94	1	199.46
18–22 Jan 2022	(Russia) 2022 Russian Junior Championships	5	68.72	9	123.25	7	191.97
26 Feb – 2 Mar 2022	(Russia) 2022 Russian Cup Final	9	62.81	10	104.22	11	167.03

Results in the 2022–23 season
Date	Event	SP		FS		Total	
Date	Event	P	Score	P	Score	P	Score
14–18 Feb 2023	(Russia) 2023 Russian Junior Championships	1	74.51	2	149.90	1	224.41
