= Alisa Dvoeglazova =

Russian figure skater (born 2008)

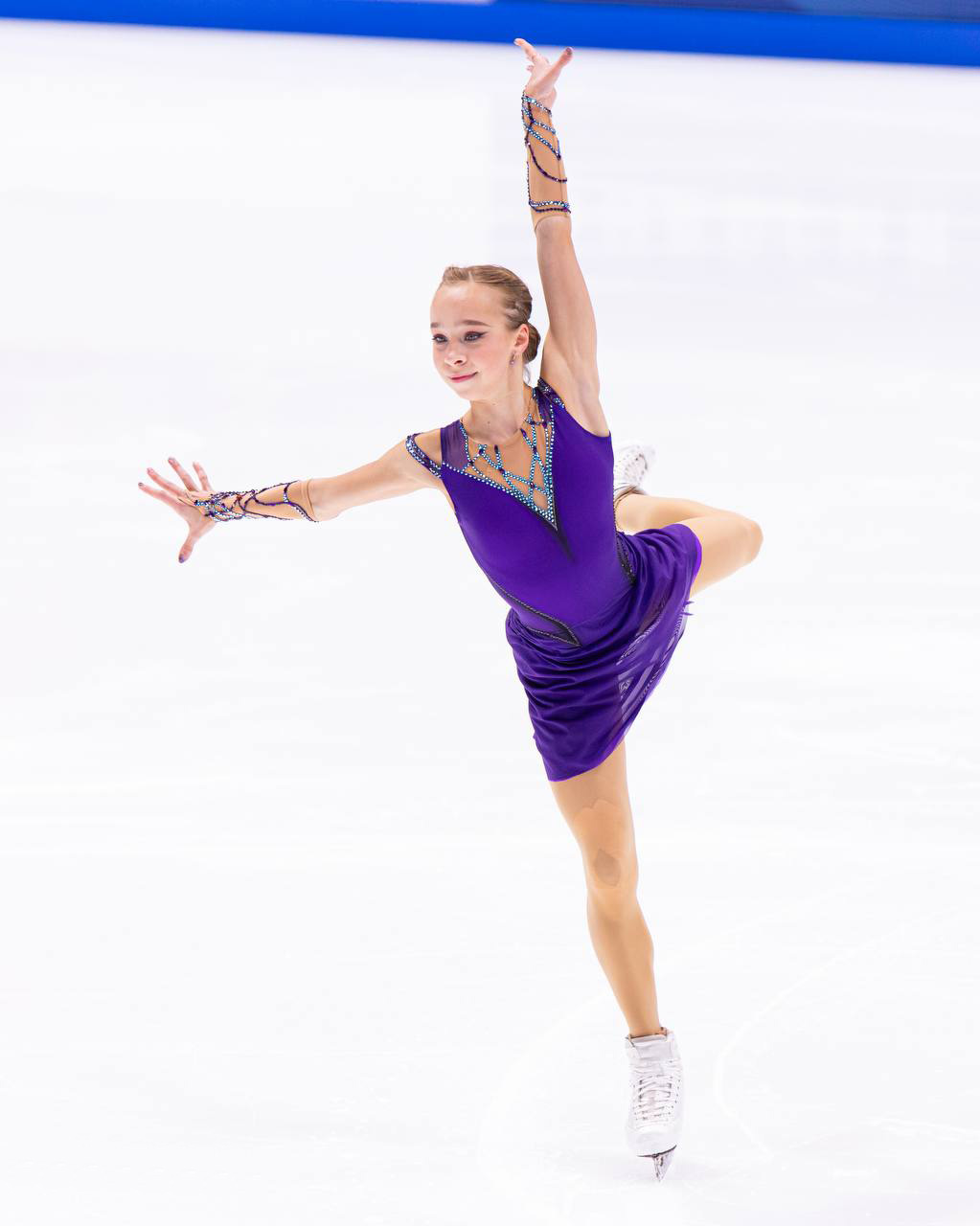
- Alisa Dvoeglazova (2025)

Personal information
- Native name: Алиса Ивановна Двоеглазова
- Full name: Alisa Ivanovna Dvoeglazova
- Born: November 10, 2008 (age 18) Moscow, Russia

Figure skating career
- Country: (Individual Neutral Athletes) Individual Neutral Athlete; Russia
- Coach: Eteri Tutberidze; Sergei Dudakov; Daniil Gleikhengauz
- Skating club: Sambo 70

Medal record
Russian Championships
Silver medal – second place	2026 Saint Petersburg	Singles

Alisa Ivanovna Dvoeglazova (Russian: Алиса Ивановна Двоеглазова; born November 10, 2008) is a Russian figure skater who currently competes as an Individual Neutral Athlete. She is the 2026 Russian national silver medalist, the 2026 Russian Grand Prix Final champion, a Russian junior national silver medalist and the 2023 Russian Junior Grand Prix final champion.

She has landed the quadruple Lutz and quadruple toe loop in domestic competitions.

== Personal life ==
Alisa Dvoeglazova was born on 10 November 2008 in Moscow, Russia.

== Career ==
=== Early career ===
Dvoeglazova began learning how to skate at the age of four after her mother, a figure skating fan, decided to introduce her to the sport. She was coached by Anastasia Burnova until the age of eleven.

In November 2020, Dvoeglazova successfully tried out to join Eteri Tutberidze's school of skaters. She then proceeded to make her national debut at the 2021 Russian Novice Championships, where she finished in fifth place.

=== 2021–2022 season: Junior debut ===
Dvoeglazova started her season by making her junior level debut domestically, winning bronze at 2022 Russian Cup Stage I, Sysran and silver at 2022 Russian Cup Stage III, Sirius. She went on to compete at the 2022 Russian Junior Championships.

In February, Dvoeglazova concluded her season with a bronze medal at the 2022 Russian Cup Final.

=== 2022–2023 season ===
Due to Russia's invasion of Ukraine, all Russian figure skaters were banned from competing international competition by the International Skating Union. Dvoeglazova thus continued to compete domestically as a junior, winning silver at 2022 Russian Grand Prix II, Sochi and gold at 2022 Russian Grand Prix V, Samara.

Following those events, Dvoeglazova suffered a fracture and crack to her tibia and was forced to sit out the remainder of the season.

=== 2023–2024 season ===
Dvoeglazova started her season by winning silver at 2023 Russian Grand Prix II, Omsk and gold at 2023 Russian Grand Prix V, Samara. Going on to compete at the 2024 Russian Junior Championships, Dvoeglazova won the silver medal behind training mate, Margarita Bazyluk, and in front of Lidia Pleskacheva and Sofia Dzepka.

Dvoeglazova then concluded her season by winning gold at the 2024 Russian Grand Prix Final, defeating Bazyluk by almost ten points.

=== 2024–2025 season ===
Dvoeglazova began her final season as a junior-level skater by winning silver at 2024 Russian Grand Prix IV, Krasnoyarsk and gold at 2024 Russian Grand Prix V, Moscow.

In February, she won the silver medal at the 2025 Russian Junior Championships behind Elena Kostyleva and ahead of Sofia Dzepka. Later that month, Dvoeglazova once again won the silver medal behind Kostyleva at the 2025 Russian Grand Prix Final.

=== 2025–2026 season: Senior debut and national silver medal ===
Moving up to the senior level, Dvoeglazova opened her season by winning gold at 2025 Russian Grand Prix II, Krasnoyarsk and silver at 2025 Russian Grand Prix V, Krasnoyarsk. She then went on to make her senior national debut at the 2026 Russian Championships, placing second in the short program and winning the free skate to win the silver medal behind training mate, Adeliia Petrosian.

In March, Dvoeglazova closed her season by winning the gold medal at the 2026 Russian Grand Prix Final, ahead of Daria Sadkova and Kamilla Neliubova. The following month, she was awarded the title of Master of Sports of Russia by the Russian Ministry of Sport.

=== 2026–2027 season ===
During the off season, it was announced that Dvoeglazova had sustained a hip injury during the "Team Tutberidze Ice Show Tour" and would be required to sit out of the first half of the upcoming competitive season.

On 30 June 2026, the International Skating Union announced that figure skaters from Russia and Belarus would be allowed to compete at international competitions as Individual Neutral Athletes (AINs). Each of these skaters are required to undergo an individual assessment conducted by the ISU Council to determine whether they meet the criteria for neutral status. Dvoeglazova's application was approved, making her eligible to compete internationally as a neutral athlete.

Dvoeglazova opened the competitive season competing at the Russian Grand Prix stages three and five, placing fourth and fifth respectively.

== Programs ==
Season	Short program	Free skating	Exhibition
2019–2020	You Must Love Me (from Evita) by Andrew Lloyd Webber performed by Lana Del Rey	Giselle by Adolphe Adam; Pas seul (Bürgmüller interpolation); No. 11 Apparition de Giselle performed by Orchestra of the Royal Opera House & Richard Bonynge; Act II: Together Again performed by Kirov Orchestra; No.8(bis) Final performed by Herbert von Karajan & Vienna Philharmonic	
2020–2021	Ping Pong by Dimie Cat; Kiki Swing by In-Grid	Giselle by Adolphe Adam; Pas seul (Bürgmüller interpolation); No. 11 Apparition de Giselle performed by Orchestra of the Royal Opera House & Richard Bonynge; Act II: Together Again performed by Kirov Orchestra; No.8(bis) Final performed by Herbert von Karajan & Vienna Philharmonic	
2021–2022	Once Upon a December (from Anastasia) by Stephen Flaherty & Lynn Ahrens performed by Liz Callaway choreo. by Daniil Gleikhengauz	Chicago by John Kander; Funny Honey performed by Taye Diggs, Renée Zellweger, John C. Reilly, & Colm Feore; Nowadays (Roxie) performed by Taye Diggs & Renée Zellweger; Nowadays / Hot Honey Rag (Medley Title) performed by Taye Diggs, Catherine Zeta-Jones, & Renée Zellweger choreo. by Daniil Gleikhengauz	
2022–2023	Hymne à l'amour by Édith Piaf & Marguerite Monnot performed by Gautier Capuçon choreo. by Daniil Gleikhengauz	La La Land; Epilogue by Justin Hurwitz; Audition (The Fools Who Dream) performed by Emma Stone choreo. by Daniil Gleikhengauz	
2023–2024	Hymne à l'amour by Édith Piaf & Marguerite Monnot performed by Gautier Capuçon choreo. by Daniil Gleikhengauz	La La Land; Epilogue by Justin Hurwitz; Audition (The Fools Who Dream) performed by Emma Stone choreo. by Daniil Gleikhengauz	Внеорбитные (Extra-Orbital) by Yulianna Karaulova
2024–2025	The Windmills of Your Mind by Michel Legrand performed by Barbra Streisand choreo. by Daniil Gleikhengauz	Sous le ciel de Paris; Milord performed by Édith Piaf choreo. by Daniil Gleikhengauz & Eteri Tutberidze	
2025–2026	Dernière danse by Indila choreo. by Daniil Gleikhengauz	ABBA Medley; Money, Money, Money performed by Christian Reindl ft. Lloren; Dancing Queen (Piano Instrumental) performed by Carlo Montana; Gimme! Gimme! Gimme! (A Man After Midnight) performed by ABBA choreo. by Daniil Gleikhengauz & Eteri Tutberidze	The Windmills of Your Mind by Michel Legrand performed by Barbra Streisand choreo. by Daniil Gleikhengauz; Sous le ciel de Paris; Milord performed by Édith Piaf choreo. by Daniil Gleikhengauz; Both Sides, Now (from CODA) performed by Emilia Jones
2026–2027	Creep by Radiohead performed by Lucy Kay choreo. by Daniil Gleikhengauz and Eteri Tutberidze	Fortanach by Sebastian Plano; Abdication (from W.E.) by Abel Korzeniowski; Forbidden Fruit (from My Brilliant Career) by François Tétaz and Molly Lewis choreo. by Daniil Gleikhengauz and Eteri Tutberidze	

== Competitive highlights ==
- TBD – Placement to be decided

=== Skating for Russia ===
Competition placements at senior level
Season	2025–26	2026–27
Russian Championships	2nd	
Russian Grand Prix Final	1st	
Russian GP Stage 2	1st	
Russian GP Stage 3		4th
Russian GP Stage 5	2nd	5th

Competition placements at junior level
Season	2021–22	2022–23	2023–24	2024–25
Russian Championships	4th		2nd	2nd
Russian Grand Prix Final (Note: The 2023 Russian Cup Final was renamed as the 2023 Russian Grand Prix Final.)	3rd		1st	2nd
Russian GP Stage 1 (Note: In 2022, the Russian Cup Stages were renamed to Russian Grand Prix Stages.)	3rd			
Russian GP Stage 2		2nd	2nd	
Russian GP Stage 3	2nd			
Russian GP Stage 4				2nd
Russian GP Stage 5		1st	1st	1st

== Detailed results ==
=== Skating for Russia ===
Results in the 2025–26 season
Date	Event	SP		FS		Total	
Date	Event	P	Score	P	Score	P	Score
1–4 Nov 2025	(Russia) 2025 Russian Grand Prix II, Krasnoyarsk	1	72.70	1	145.09	1	217.79
21–25 Nov 2025	(Russia) 2025 Russian Grand Prix V, Omsk	4	70.89	2	150.75	2	221.64
18–21 Dec 2025	(Russia) 2026 Russian Championships	2	74.59	1	152.81	2	227.40
6–9 Mar 2026	(Russia) 2026 Russian Grand Prix Final	1	76.29	1	144.44	1	220.73

Results in the 2026–27 season
Date	Event	SP		FS		Total	
Date	Event	P	Score	P	Score	P	Score
13–15 Nov, 2026	(Russia) 2026 Russian Grand Prix V, Omsk	5	72.59	5	128.75	5	201.34

=== Junior level ===
Results in the 2021–22 season
Date	Event	SP		FS		Total	
Date	Event	P	Score	P	Score	P	Score
22–26 Sep 2021	(Russia) 2021 Russian Cup Stage I, Sysran	3	67.93	3	127.47	3	195.40
24–28 Oct 2021	(Russia) 2021 Russian Cup Stage III, Sirius	2	68.00	2	132.17	2	200.17
18–22 Jan 2022	(Russia) 2022 Russian Junior Championships	8	67.58	3	139.25	4	206.83
26 Feb – 2 Mar 2022	(Russia) 2022 Russian Cup Final	3	66.93	4	130.06	3	196.99

Results in the 2022–23 season
Date	Event	SP		FS		Total	
Date	Event	P	Score	P	Score	P	Score
26–28 Oct 2022	(Russia) 2022 Russian Grand Prix II, Sochi	2	70.96	2	145.16	2	216.12
16–18 Nov 2022	(Russia) 2022 Russian Cup Stage V, Samara	1	68.65	1	152.86	1	221.51

Results in the 2023–24 season
Date	Event	SP		FS		Total	
Date	Event	P	Score	P	Score	P	Score
18–20 Oct 2023	(Russia) 2023 Russian Grand Prix II, Omsk	2	69.88	1	135.28	1	205.16
15–18 Nov 2023	(Russia) 2023 Russian Grand Prix V, Samara	2	71.03	1	159.75	1	230.78
5–9 Feb 2024	(Russia) 2024 Russian Junior Championships	2	73.50	2	157.83	2	231.33
13–16 Mar 2024	(Russia) 2024 Russian Grand Prix Final	2	73.58	2	158.65	1	232.23

Results in the 2024–25 season
Date	Event	SP		FS		Total	
Date	Event	P	Score	P	Score	P	Score
6–8 Nov 2024	(Russia) 2024 Russian Grand Prix IV, Krasnoyarsk	1	72.70	2	148.49	2	221.19
13–15 Nov 2024	(Russia) 2024 Russian Grand Prix V, Moscow	3	72.09	1	160.84	1	232.93
5–9 Feb 2025	(Russia) 2025 Russian Championships	3	73.25	2	158.31	2	231.56
27 Feb – 2 Mar 2025	(Russia) 2025 Russian Grand Prix Final	1	73.50	2	155.56	2	229.06
