= Sofia Dzepka =

Russian figure skater (born 2009)

- Dzepka at the 2026 Russian Challenge

Personal information
- Native name: София Александровна Дзепка
- Full name: Sofia Aleksandrovna Dzepka
- Born: 7 August 2009 (age 17) Moscow, Russia
- Home town: Moscow, Russia

Figure skating career
- Country: (Individual Neutral Athletes) Individual Neutral Athlete; Russia
- Discipline: Women's singles
- Coach: Ekaterina Moiseeva; Maxim Zavozin; Olga Simonova
- Skating club: CSKA

Sofia Aleksandrovna Dzepka (Russian: София Александровна Дзепка; off. sp.: Sofiia Dzepka; born 7 August 2009) is a Russian figure skater who currently competes as an Individual Neutral Athlete. She is the 2026 JGP Xi'An and the 2026 JGP Bangkok champion. She is the 17th woman to land a ratified quadruple jump in international competition.

Domestically, she is the 2026 Russian Junior Grand Prix Final champion, the 2025 Russian–Chinese Winter Youth Games champion, the 2025 Russian junior national bronze medalist, and the 2024 Russian Junior Grand Prix Final bronze medalist.

== Early life ==
Sofia Dzepka was born 7 August 2009 in Moscow. Her parents took her to a figure skating school following the advice of doctors who said that sports would improve her immune system.

== Career ==
=== Early career ===
Dzepka missed two competitive seasons (2020–21, 2021–22) during her novice career due to injury, returning to competition April 2022. Dzepka placed 4th at the 2024 Russian Junior Championships.

=== 2024–2025 season ===
Dzepka opened her season skating at stage 3 of the Russian Grand Prix, placing 4th. She went onto win the silver medal at stage 6.

In January, she competed at and won the Russian–Chinese Winter Youth Games.

In February at the 2025 Russian Junior Championships, she landed her first-ever quadruple toe loop in domestic competition in the free skate, additionally winning the bronze medal with 218.38 points, behind Elena Kostyleva and Alisa Dvoeglazova.

She missed the 2025 Russian Junior Grand Prix Final due to an illness.

Dzepka performing an ina bauer at the 2026 Russian Challenge

=== 2025–2026 season ===
Dzepka opened her season by winning gold medals at both of her Russian Grand Prix stages.

At the 2026 Russian Junior Championships, Dzepka placed 16th in the short program after falling on her combination jump, unable to execute the required elements. She rose to 4th place overall with a near clean free program.

In March, she won the 2026 Russian Junior Grand Prix Final with her new domestic personal best of 223.55 points. In her free skate, she landed two quadruple toe loops.

=== 2026–2027 season: Junior international debut ===
On 30 June 2026, the International Skating Union announced that figure skaters from Russia and Belarus would be allowed to compete at international competitions as Individual Neutral Athletes (AINs) after having previously been banned from international events due to Russia's full-scale invasion of Ukraine in 2022. Each of these skaters are required to undergo an individual assessment conducted by the ISU Council to determine whether they meet the criteria for neutral status. Dzepka's application was approved, making her eligible to compete internationally as a neutral athlete. Having initially been assigned as the alternate spot for the Junior Grand Prix in China and Thailand, Dzepka was ultimately sent to the competitions following Elena Kostyleva's withdrawal due to her injury.

Dzepka debuted internationally at the 2026 JGP Xi'An, winning the gold medal. She landed her first internationally ratified quadruple toe loop jump in the free skate, becoming the 17th woman to do so and winning the competition with a 24-point margin. At the 2026 JGP Bangkok, she placed second in the short program and first in the free skate to secure the gold medal, qualifying her for the Final in Chongqing.

Dzepka made her senior domestic debut at the third stage of the Russian Figure Skating Cup, placing eighth.

== Programs ==
Season	Short program	Free skating
2026–2027	Introduction and Tarantella Op. 43 by Pablo de Sarasate; Grand Spanish Dance (from Raymonda) by Alexander Glazunov choreo. by Artem Fedorchenko	The Matrix: Switches Brew by Don Davis; Clubbed to Death; Chateau by Rob Dougan choreo. by Artem Fedorchenko
2025–2026	Waltz (from War and Peace) by Sergei Prokofiev performed by Bolshoi Theatre Orchestra choreo. by Andrey Ezhlov, Ilia Averbukh, and Olga Simonova	Adagio of Spartacus and Phrygia (from Spartacus) by Aram Khachaturian choreo. by Olga Orlova and Olga Simonova
2024–2025	I'll Take Care of You by Brook Benton performed by Beth Hart and Joe Bonamassa	Adagio of Spartacus and Phrygia (from Spartacus) by Aram Khachaturian choreo. by Olga Orlova and Olga Simonova
2023–2024	I'll Take Care of You by Brook Benton performed by Beth Hart and Joe Bonamassa	City Lights by Charlie Chaplin

== Competitive highlights ==
- JGP – Event of the ISU Junior Grand Prix Series
- TBD – Assigned

=== Skating as an Individual Neutral Athlete ===
Competition placements at junior level
Season	2026–27
JGP Final	TBD
JGP Thailand	1st
JGP China	1st

=== Skating for Russia ===
Competition placements at junior level
Season	2023–24	2024–25	2025–26
Russian Championships	4th	3rd	4th
Russian Grand Prix Final	3rd		1st

== Detailed results ==
ISU personal best scores in the +5/-5 GOE System
Segment	Type	Score	Event
Total	TSS	213.28	2026 JGP China
Short program	TSS	72.74	2026 JGP China
Short program	TES	42.59	2026 JGP China
Short program	PCS	30.15	2026 JGP China
Free skating	TSS	140.54	2026 JGP China
Free skating	TES	79.37	2026 JGP China
Free skating	PCS	61.17	2026 JGP China

=== Junior level ===
Results in the 2026–27 season
Date	Event	SP		FS		Total	
Date	Event	P	Score	P	Score	P	Score
20–22 Aug, 2026	2026 JGP China	1	72.74	1	140.54	1	213.28
3–5 Sept, 2026	2026 JGP Thailand	2	70.17	1	135.56	1	205.73

=== Senior level ===
Results in the 2026–27 season
Date	Event	SP		FS		Total	
Date	Event	P	Score	P	Score	P	Score
30 Oct–2 Nov, 2026	(Russia) 2026 Russian Grand Prix III, Krasnoyarsk	8	60.88	8	130.16	8	191.04

=== Junior level ===
Results in the 2025–26 season
Date	Event	SP		FS		Total	
Date	Event	P	Score	P	Score	P	Score
24–25 Sep 2025	(Russia) 2025 Junior Grinkov Memorial	1	69.66	1	151.49	1	221.15
14–17 Oct 2025	(Russia) 2025 Russian Grand Prix I, Moscow	1	69.99	1	143.27	1	213.26
7–10 Nov 2025	(Russia) 2025 Russian Grand Prix III, Kazan	1	72.17	1	139.84	1	212.01
8–12 Dec 2025	(Russia) 2025 Moscow City Cup	1	69.71	1	155.32	1	225.03
4–8 Feb 2026	(Russia) 2026 Russian Junior Championships	16	60.54	4	144.78	4	205.32
4–6 Mar 2026	(Russia) 2026 Russian Junior Grand Prix Final	1	72.91	1	150.64	1	223.55

Results in the 2024–25 season
Date	Event	SP		FS		Total	
Date	Event	P	Score	P	Score	P	Score
23–25 Sep 2024	(Russia) 2024 Junior Grinkov Memorial	11	56.84	9	116.65	9	173.49
30 Oct–1 Nov 2024	(Russia) 2024 Russian Grand Prix III, Kazan	2	71.54	5	123.37	4	194.91
20—22 Nov 2024	(Russia) 2024 Russian Grand Prix VI, St. Petersburg	1	72.33	2	138.93	2	211.96
3—6 Dec 2024	(Russia) 2024 Moscow City Cup	1	72.58	1	135.17	1	207.75
4–8 Jan 2025	(Russia) 2025 Russian–Chinese Winter Youth Games	1	72.19	2	129.43	1	201.62
5–9 Feb 2025	(Russia) 2025 Russian Junior Championships	4	72.98	4	145.40	3	218.38

Results in the 2023–24 season
Date	Event	SP		FS		Total	
Date	Event	P	Score	P	Score	P	Score
25—27 Oct 2023	(Russia) 2023 Russian Grand Prix III, Krasnoyarsk	1	70.30	1	135.35	1	205.65
23-25 Nov 2023	(Russia) 2023 Russian Grand Prix VI, Moscow	3	64.65	4	132.66	4	197.31
5–9 Feb 2024	(Russia) 2024 Russian Junior Championships	3	70.75	5	139.29	4	210.04
13–16 Mar 2024	(Russia) 2024 Russian Junior Grand Prix Final	1	74.03	4	141.70	3	215.73
