= Maria Zakharova (figure skater) =

Russian figure skater (born 2007)

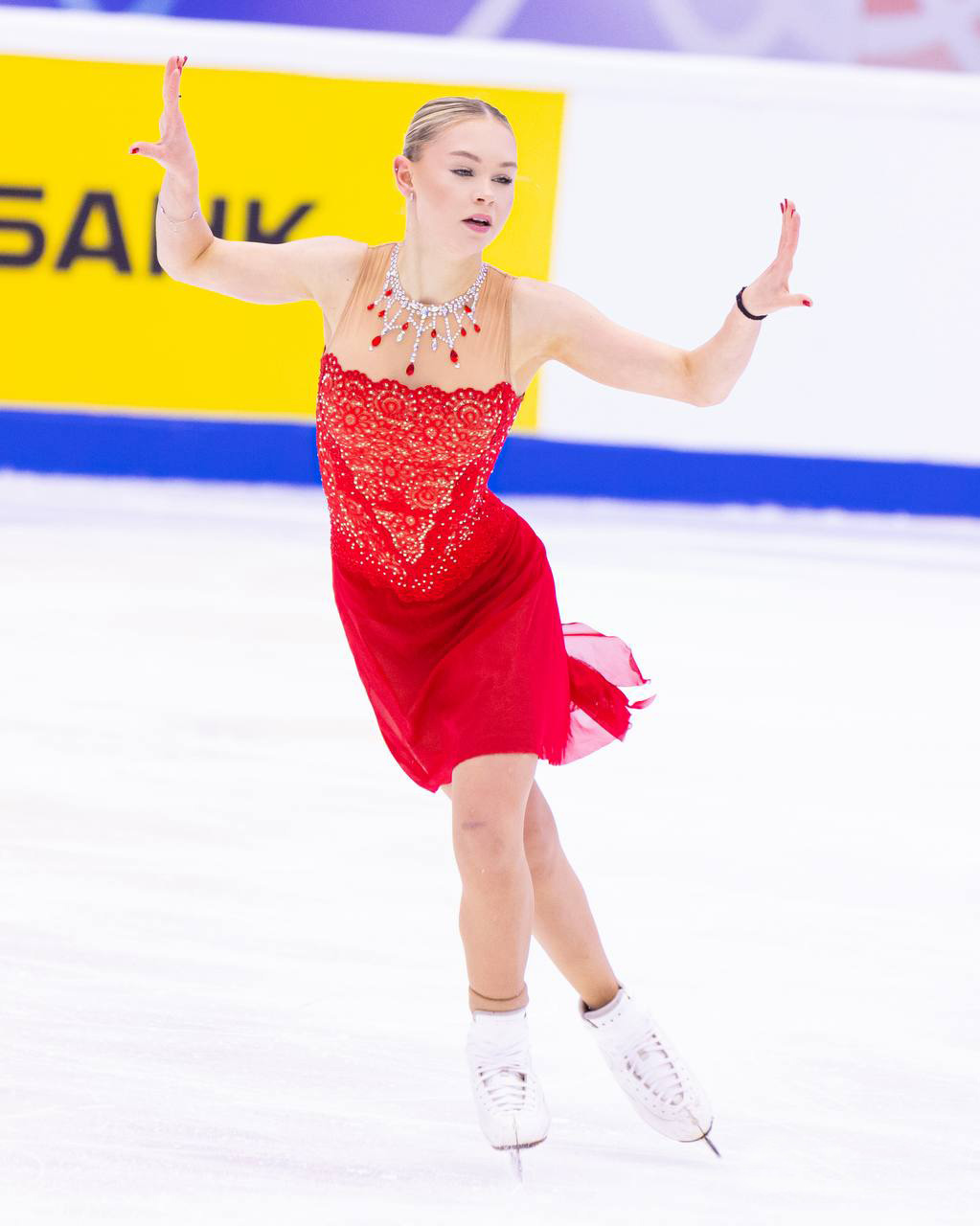
- Zakharova performing her free program at the 2025 Russian Grand Prix Stage in Kazan

Personal information
- Native name: Мария Станиславовна Захарова
- Full name: Maria Stanislavovna Zakharova
- Other names: Masha
- Born: 21 September 2007 (age 19) Moscow, Russia
- Home town: Moscow

Figure skating career
- Country: (Individual Neutral Athletes) Individual Neutral Athlete; Russia
- Discipline: Women's singles
- Coach: Anna Tsareva
- Skating club: Sambo-70 "Khrustalny"

Medal record
Russian Championships
Bronze medal – third place	2026 Saint Petersburg	Singles

Maria Stanislavovna Zakharova (Russian: Мария Станиславовна Захарова; off. sp.: Mariia Zakharova; born 21 September 2007) is a Russian figure skater who currently competes as an Individual Neutral Athlete. She is the 2026 Russian national bronze medalist.

She has performed quadruple jumps in domestic competition.

== Personal life ==
Maria Zakharova was born on 21 September 2007 in Moscow, Russia. Her mother is figure skating coach, Anna Tsareva. Her father is former figure skater and presently coach Stanislav Zakharov, a World Junior pairs champion. She has a brother 11 months older who plays hockey.

== Career ==
=== Early career ===
Zakharova has trained under her mother Anna Tsareva since before she was two. As a junior, she medaled at several Russian Grand Prix stages and represented her country at the 2021 ISU Junior Grand Prix in Slovakia, finishing fourth.

She missed two and a half seasons first due to a stress fracture of the navicular bone in her right foot and then due to a cut to her thigh suffered in October 2024.

=== 2025–2026 season: Comeback, national bronze medal ===
In what was her first season after return to sport, she placed second, after Ksenia Sinitsyna, at the early October Moscow Championships and fourth at two Russian Grand Prix stages, in Magnitogorsk and in Kazan.

In December, she won the bronze at the 2026 Russian Figure Skating Championships after landing two quadruple toe loops in the free skate.

Zakharova finished the season by placing 11th at the Russian Grand Prix Final.

=== 2026–2027 season ===
On 30 June 2026, the International Skating Union announced that figure skaters from Russia and Belarus would be allowed to compete at international competitions as Individual Neutral Athletes (AINs). Each of these skaters are be required to undergo an individual assessment conducted by the ISU Council to determine whether they meet the criteria for neutral status. Zakharova's application was approved, making her eligible to compete internationally as a neutral athlete.

Zakharova made her return to the international stage at the 2026 CS Denis Ten Memorial Challenge where she finished in fifth place, scoring a new personal best free skating score.

== Programs ==
Season	Short program	Free skating	Exhibition
2026–2027	Fever Eva by Cassidy; Oye cómo va by Tito Puente	Adagio by Yasmin Levy, Gil Sholat	Show Me How You Burlesque by Christina Aguilera
2025–2026	Feeling Good by Apashe and Cherry Lena	Moulin Rouge Soundtrack: Lady Marmalade by Christina Aguilera, Lil' Kim, Mýa and P!nk; One Day I'll Fly Away by Nicole Kidman; Sparkling Diamonds by Nicole Kidman, Jim Broadbent, Lara Mulcahy, Caroline O'Connor and Natalie Mendoza	Suite from The Devil Wears Prada by Theodore Shapiro; Suddenly I See by KT Tunstall; Vogue by Madonna
2021–2022	Libertango by Astor Piazzolla choreo. by Maria Borisova	Paint It, Black performed by Ciara choreo. by Maria Borisova	

== Competitive highlights ==
=== Skating as an Individual Neutral Athlete ===
Competition placements at senior level
Season	2026–27
CS Denis Ten Memorial	5th

=== Skating for Russia ===
Competition placements at senior level
Season	2025–26
Russian Championships	3rd

Competition placements at junior level
Season	2019–20	2020–21	2021–22
Russian Championships	14th		14th
JGP Slovakia			4th

== Detailed results ==
ISU personal best scores in the +5/-5 GOE System
Segment	Type	Score	Event
Total	TSS	190.33	2021 JGP Slovakia
Short program	TSS	69.04	2021 JGP Slovakia
Short program	TES	39.10	2021 JGP Slovakia
Short program	PCS	29.94	2021 JGP Slovakia
Free skating	TSS	129.48	2026 CS Denis Ten Memorial Challenge
Free skating	TES	70.13	2026 CS Denis Ten Memorial Challenge
Free skating	PCS	60.35	2026 CS Denis Ten Memorial Challenge

=== Skating as an Individual Neutral Athlete ===
Results in the 2026–27 season
Date	Event	SP		FS		Total	
Date	Event	P	Score	P	Score	P	Score
Oct 8–11, 2026	(Kazakhstan) 2026 CS Denis Ten Memorial Challenge	8	58.29	5	129.48	5	187.77

=== Senior level ===
Results in the 2025–26 season
Date	Event	SP		FS		Total	
Date	Event	P	Score	P	Score	P	Score
Dec. 17–22, 2025	(Russia) 2026 Russian Figure Skating Championships	5	71.37	4	146.36	3	217.73

=== Junior level ===
Results in the 2021–22 season
Date	Event	SP		FS		Total	
Date	Event	P	Score	P	Score	P	Score
Sept. 1–4, 2021	2021 JGP Slovakia	4	69.04	5	121.29	4	190.33
Dec. 22–24, 2021	(Russia) 2021 Russian Figure Skating Championships	7	68.10	15	111.10	14	179.20

Results in the 2019–20 season
Date	Event	SP		FS		Total	
Date	Event	P	Score	P	Score	P	Score
Dec. 24–29, 2019	(Russia) 2019 Russian Figure Skating Championships	14	62.80	14	114.74	14	177.54
