= Daniil Gleikhengauz =

Russian figure skater

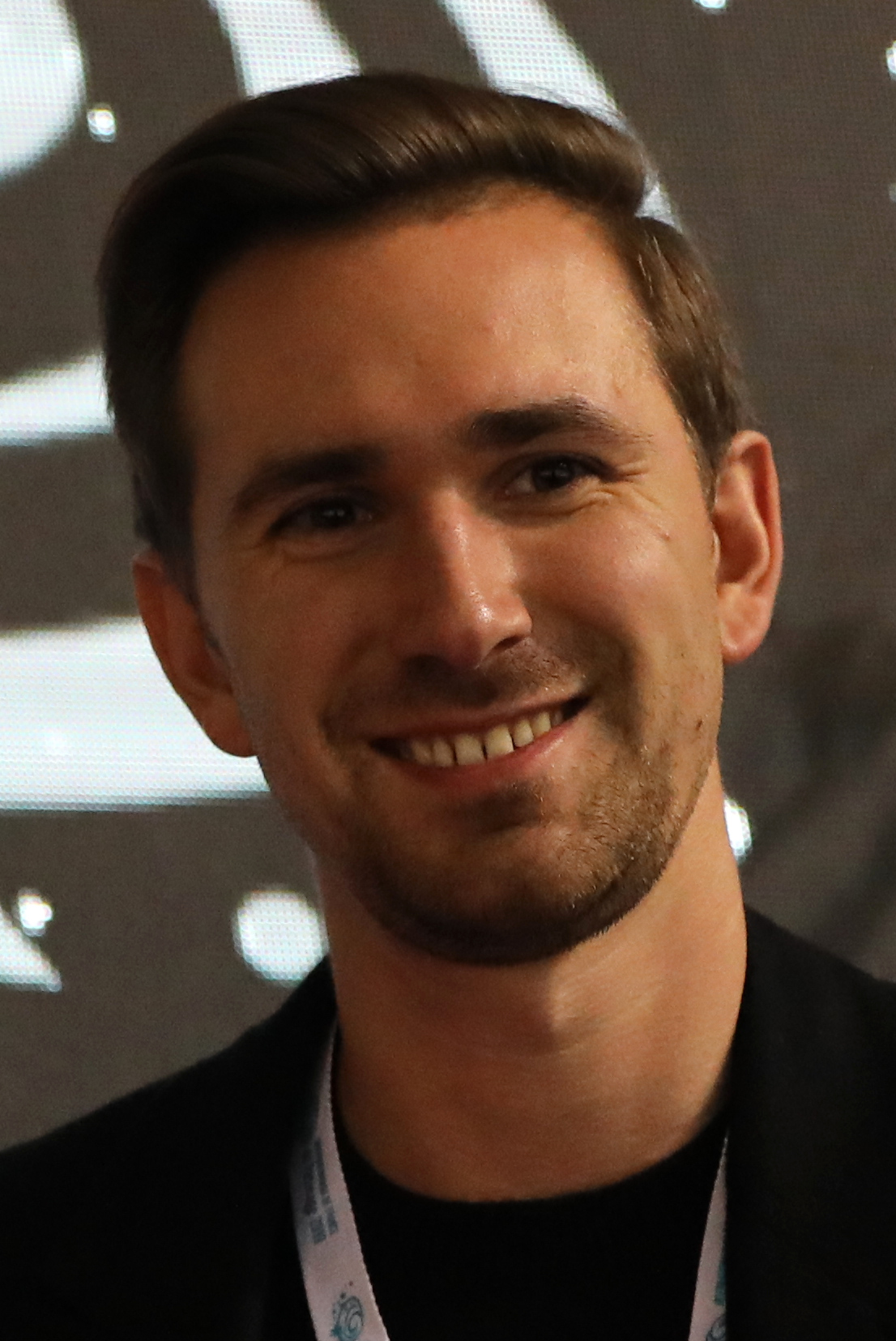
- Gleikhengauz in 2019

Personal information
- Full name: Daniil Markovich Gleikhengauz
- Other names: Daniil Gleichengauz
- Born: 3 June 1991 (age 35) Moscow, Russian SFSR, Soviet Union

Figure skating career
- Country: Russia
- Coach: Alexander Zhulin; Oleg Volkov
- Skating club: Moskvitch SC

Daniil Markovich Gleikhengauz (or Gleichenhaus; Russian: Даниил Маркович Глейхенгауз, born 3 June 1991) is a Russian former ice dancer and single skater. In single skating, he is the 2007 Russian junior national bronze medalist and competed at the 2007 World Junior Championships, placing 19th. He was coached by Viktor Kudriavtsev.

Gleikhengauz began competing in ice dancing in the 2010–11 season, with partner Ksenia Korobkova. They made their international debut the following season, winning the junior title at the 2011 NRW Trophy. They were coached by Alexander Zhulin and Oleg Volkov.

After his father's death, Gleikhengauz retired from his competitive career and began performing in Ilia Averbukh's ice show. Later he began coaching and in 2014 he became a choreographer in Eteri Tutberidze's team at Sambo-70 in Moscow. His mother, Lyudmila Borisovna Shalashova, former ballet dancer and ballet teacher, who also worked with Eteri Tutberidze's team, died on 29 August 2019.

== Choreographer ==
Gelikhenguaz has choreographed programs for:

- Sofia Akateva
- Nika Egadze
- Alexey Erokhov
- Maiia Khromykh
- Alena Kostornaia
- Morisi Kvitelashvili
- Evgenia Medvedeva
- Anna Shcherbakova
- Evgenia Tarasova / Vladimir Morozov
- Alexandra Trusova
- Polina Tsurskaya
- Elizabet Tursynbaeva
- Kamila Valieva
- Alina Zagitova
- Adeliia Petrosian
- Petr Gumennik
- Evgeni Semenenko
- Daniil Samsonov
- Arseny Fedotov
- Alisa Dvoeglazova
- Margarita Bazyluk
- Elizaveta Andreeva

== Programs ==
| Season | Short program | Free skating |
|---|---|---|
| 2006–2007 | Sarabande by George Frideric Handel (modern arrangement) | Harlem Nocturne by Earle Hagen; Jalousie 'Tango Tzigane' by Jacob Gade; Top Hat by Irving Berlin; Rock'n'Roll by Bill Haley |

== Competitive highlights ==
JGP: Junior Grand Prix

=== Ice dancing with Korobkova ===
International: Junior
| Event | 2011–12 |
|---|---|
| NRW Trophy | 1st |
| Pavel Roman Memorial | 1st |
National
| Russian Junior Champ. | 11th |

=== Men's singles ===
International: Junior
| Event | 02–03 | 05–06 | 06–07 | 07–08 | 08–09 |
|---|---|---|---|---|---|
| Junior Worlds | | | 19th | | |
| JGP Canada | | 7th | | | |
| JGP U.K. | | | | 5th | |
| Triglav Trophy | 8th | | | | |
National
| Russian Champ. | | | | 17th | |
| Russian Junior Champ. | | | 3rd | 9th | 8th |
