= Kamilla Neliubova =

Russian figure skater (born 2008)

- Neliubova at the 2024–25 Russian Grand Prix stage in Kazan

Personal information
- Native name: Камилла Андреевна Нелюбова
- Born: 14 April 2008 (age 18) Krasnodar, Russia

Figure skating career
- Country: (Individual Neutral Athletes) Individual Neutral Athlete; Russia
- Discipline: Women's singles
- Coach: Daria Gureeva; Adelina Sotnikova
- Skating club: Sports School No. 4
- Began skating: 2013

Kamilla Adreevna Neliubova (Russian: Камилла Андреевна Нелюбова; born 14 April 2008) is a Russian figure skater who currently competes as an Individual Neutral Athlete. She is the 2026 Russian Grand Prix Final bronze medalist.

== Biography ==
Kamilla Neliubova was born 14 April 2008 in Krasnodar. She has an older sister and a younger brother who plays hockey.

== Career ==
=== Early career ===
She took on figure skating at the age of four. At 10, she moved to Sochi, where she trained under Alexei Urmanov for two years, and later to Moscow, where she trained under Sofia Fedchenko for one season and a half, and under Evgeni Plushenko for two seasons. She eventually began and now currently trains under Daria Gureeva.

=== 2024–2025 season ===
At the 2025 Russian Championships in Omsk, Neliubova placed 16th with 169.04 points.

=== 2025–2026 season: Russian Grand Prix Final bronze ===
In December 2025 at the 2026 Russian Championships in Saint Petersburg, Neliubova placed 7th with 214.75 points.

In March 2026, Neliubova won bronze at the 2026 Russian Grand Prix Final, behind Alisa Dvoeglazova and Daria Sadkova.

=== 2026–2027 season: International debut ===
On 30 June 2026, the International Skating Union announced that figure skaters from Russia and Belarus would be allowed to compete at international competitions as Individual Neutral Athletes (AINs). Each of these skaters are required to undergo an individual assessment conducted by the ISU Council to determine whether they meet the criteria for neutral status. Neliubova's application was approved, making her eligible to compete internationally as a neutral athlete.

Neliubova made her senior international debut at the Kinoshita Group Cup, a challenger held in September in Japan. In her short program, she landed a triple Axel, a triple flip, and a triple Lutz–triple toe loop combination, and placed 3rd with 76.08 points. After a fall on a triple Lutz–triple toe loop combination and an unsuccessful triple Axel in her free skate, she placed fifth with a total of 201.34 points.

In October, she won the Russian Grand Prix stage in Kazan.

== Programs ==
Season	Short program	Free skating
2026–2027	Your Heart Is as Black as Night by Beth Hart and Joe Bonamassa	La rencontre fatale by Dark Sanctuary; Fragments by Rusanda Panfili

== Competitive highlights ==
- CS – Event of the ISU Challenger Series
- TBD – Assigned

=== Skating as an Individual Neutral Athlete ===
Competition placements at senior level
Season	2026–27
CS Kinoshita Group Cup	5th
CS Golden Spin of Zagreb	TBD

=== Skating for Russia ===
Competition placements at senior level
Season	2024–25	2025–26	2026–27
Russian Championships	16th	7th	
Russian Grand Prix Final		3rd	
Russian Grand Prix I			1st
Russian Grand Prix II	5th		
Russian Grand Prix III		7th	
Russian Grand Prix IV	5th		1st
Russian Grand Prix V		5th	

== Detailed results ==
ISU personal best scores in the +5/-5 GOE System
Segment	Type	Score	Event
Total	TSS	201.34	2026 CS Kinoshita Group Cup
Short program	TSS	76.08	2026 CS Kinoshita Group Cup
Short program	TES	44.36	2026 CS Kinoshita Group Cup
Short program	PCS	31.72	2026 CS Kinoshita Group Cup
Free skating	TSS	125.26	2026 CS Kinoshita Group Cup
Free skating	TES	62.65	2026 CS Kinoshita Group Cup
Free skating	PCS	62.61	2026 CS Kinoshita Group Cup

=== Skating as an Individual Neutral Athlete ===
Results in the 2026–27 season
Date	Event	SP		FS		Total	
Date	Event	P	Score	P	Score	P	Score
4–6 Sep 2026	(Japan) 2026 CS Kinoshita Group Cup	3	76.08	6	125.26	5	201.34
2–5 Dec 2026	(Croatia) 2026 CS Golden Spin of Zagreb						

=== Skating for Russia ===
Results in the 2024–25 season
Date	Event	SP		FS		Total	
Date	Event	P	Score	P	Score	P	Score
1–3 Nov, 2024	(Russia) 2024 Russian Grand Prix II, Kazan	4	64.13	6	124.82	5	188.95
15–17 Nov, 2024	(Russia) 2024 Russian Grand Prix IV, Moscow	5	64.69	6	126.32	5	191.01
18–23 Dec, 2024	(Russia) 2025 Russian Championships	15	60.53	18	108.51	16	169.04

Results in the 2025–26 season
Date	Event	SP		FS		Total	
Date	Event	P	Score	P	Score	P	Score
5–7 Nov, 2025	(Russia) 2025 Russian Grand Prix III, Kazan	7	65.06	6	126.84	7	191.90
21–24 Nov, 2025	(Russia) 2025 Russian Grand Prix V, Omsk	5	70.49	6	125.22	5	195.71
18–21 Dec, 2025	(Russia) 2026 Russian Championships	9	69.47	5	145.28	7	214.75
6–9 Mar, 2026	(Russia) 2026 Russian Grand Prix Final	5	72.31	5	138.36	3	210.67

Results in the 2026–27 season
Date	Event	SP		FS		Total	
Date	Event	P	Score	P	Score	P	Score
17–18 Oct, 2026	(Russia) 2026 Russian Grand Prix I, Kazan	2	70.89	1	146.86	1	217.75
6–9 Nov, 2026	(Russia) 2026 Russian Grand Prix IV, Yekaterinburg	1	78.67	1	138.39	1	217.06
