= Margarita Bazyliuk =

Russian figure skater (born 2011)

- Bazyliuk at the 2025 Russian Grand Prix stage in Kazan

Personal information
- Native name: Маргарита Андреевна Базылюк
- Full name: Margarita Andreevna Bazyliuk
- Other names: Bazylyuk; Bazyluk
- Born: 12 March 2011 (age 15) Moscow, Russia

Figure skating career
- Country: (Individual Neutral Athletes) Individual Neutral Athlete; Russia
- Discipline: Women's singles
- Coach: Eteri Tutberidze; Sergei Dudakov
- Skating club: TsFK Eteri Tutberidze

Margarita Andreevna Bazyliuk (Russian: Маргарита Андреевна Базылюк; born 12 March 2011) is a Russian figure skater who currently competes as an Individual Neutral Athlete. She is the 2024 Russian junior national champion.

Bazyliuk has landed quadruple jumps and the triple Axel in domestic competition. In January 2024 at the Russian Jumping Championships, she successfully landed a quadruple–quadruple (Salchow–Euler–Salchow) combination.

== Personal life ==
Margarita Bazyliuk was born on 12 March 2011 in Moscow. She has a sister four years older than her. In addition to figure skating, she also enjoys cooking.

== Career ==
=== Early years ===
Bazyliuk began learning how to skate at the age of three after following her sister into the sport. As a young child, she was first coached by Svetlana Shagina at the KFK “Dinamovets” before subsequently transferring to the Sambo-70, “Konek Tchaikovskoy” to train under Alima Gershkovich.

In 2020, Bazyliuk successfully tried out to join Eteri Tutberidze's group at Sambo-70, “Khrustalny”. She later shared that had Tutberidze not agreed to coach her, she would have quit figure skating at that point in her life.

Bazyliuk went on to make her national debut at the 2023 Russian Novice Championships.

=== 2023–2024 season ===
Due to Russia's invasion of Ukraine, all Russian figure skaters were banned from competing international competition by the International Skating Union. Bazyliuk thus made her junior debut by competing in domestic events, winning gold at 2024 Russian Grand Prix I, Ufa and 2024 Russian Grand Prix IV, Kazan, respectively.

In January, she won the individual gold at the Russian Figure Skating Jumping Championships, ahead of Adeliia Petrosian and Elena Kostyleva. The following month, Bazyliuk won the 2024 Russian Junior Championships. Her free skate included a quadruple Salchow and two quadruple toe loop jumps.

Bazyliuk then finished her season at the 2024 Russian Junior Grand Prix Final. She placed twelfth in the short program but won the free skate to win the silver medal behind Alisa Dvoeglazova.

=== 2024–2025 season ===
Bazyliuk opened her season by winning gold at the 2024 Russian Grand Prix III, Kazan. Following the event, however, she sustained an injury and was forced to withdraw from 2024 Russian Grand Prix V, Moscow. Bazyliuk thus registered for 2024 Russian Grand Prix VI, Saint Petersburg, where she struggled throughout the event and finished in fourth place overall.

In February, Bazyliuk competed at the 2025 Russian Junior Championships. She placed third in the short program, which included a successfully landed a triple Axel. She commented to the press:

I had a small injury, and I wanted to do my short without the triple Axel. [Then,] Eteri Georgievna [Tutberidze] comes back from the European Championships and says: "You can do the jump, why aren't you going to?" She says: "Do the jump." I say: "Okay." I came here and, thank God, I did the jump.

The following day, Bazyliuk had a disastrous free skate where she fell three times, only placing fifteenth in that segment and dropping to ninth place overall. She would later explain: "I was counting on landing my first Axel and that then everything else would just follow. I hardly trained quads, mostly the Axel.

The following month, Bazyliuk competed at the 2025 Russian Grand Prix Final, winning the bronze medal behind Elena Kostyleva and Alisa Dvoeglazova.

After the competition, she commented to Championat.com: "The season went downhill, that probably has to do with my head. I must be doing something wrong. My health is fine."

Bazyliuk performing an ina bauer at the 2025 Russian Grand Prix stage in Kazan

=== 2025–2026 season ===
Bazyliuk began her season by winning gold at the 2025 Russian Grand Prix II, Magnitogorsk. Two weeks later, she competed at the 2025 Russian Grand Prix IV, Kazan where she finished fifteenth in the short program after falling on her triple Lutz and failing to perform a jump combination. She won the free skate, however, moving up to sixth place overall.

In February, Bazyliuk finished her season by placing fifth at the 2026 Russian Junior Championships.

=== 2026–2027 season ===
On 30 June 2026, the International Skating Union announced that figure skaters from Russia and Belarus would be allowed to compete at international competitions as Individual Neutral Athletes (AINs). Each of these skaters are required to undergo an individual assessment conducted by the ISU Council to determine whether they meet the criteria for neutral status. Bazyliuk's application was approved, making her eligible to compete internationally as a neutral athlete.

== Skating style and influences ==
Bazyliuk has been often quoted to say that she wants to jump like Trusova, glide like Kostornaia, spin like Valieva, and be calm like Shcherbakova.

She also considers Kaori Sakamoto to be one of her figure skating idols, citing that she admires Sakamoto's "beautiful, soaring jumps and feminine skating."

== Programs ==
| Season | Short program | Free skating |
|---|---|---|
| 2025–2026 | Maison by Emilio Piano ft. Lucie choreo. by Eteri Tutberidze & Daniil Gleikhengauz | Metamorphosis Two by Philip Glass; The Path of Silence performed by Philippe Briand, Gabriel Saban, Anne-Sophie Versnaeyen choreo. by Eteri Tutberidze & Daniil Gleikhengauz |
| 2024–2025 | Miserlou performed by Caroline Campbell & William Joseph choreo. by Eteri Tutberidze & Daniil Gleikhengauz | O Fortuna (from Carmina Burana) by Carl Orff performed by Franz Welser-Möst; 503 (from Angels & Demons) by Hans Zimmer choreo. by Eteri Tutberidze & Daniil Gleikhengauz |
| 2023–2024 | Once Upon a Dream (from Maleficenta) performed by Lana Del Rey | Prologue (Look Down) / At the End of the Day (from Les Misérables) Claude-Michel Schönberg performed by Bournemouth Symphony Orchestra & Seann Alderking; I Dreamed a Dream (from Glee) performed by Lea Michele & Idina Menzel |
| 2022–2023 | Let It Go by Robert Lopez & Kristen Anderson-Lopez performed by The Piano Guys | Cloud Atlas; The Cloud Atlas Sextet for Orchestra; Travel to Edinburgh by Tom Tykwer |
| 2021–2022 | Speechless (from Aladdin) by Alan Menken performed by Naomi Scott | Peer Gynt Suite No.1, Op. 46 by Edvard Grieg; Morning Mood performed by Gennady Rozhdestvensky & Grand Symphony Orchestra of the All-Union Radio and Central Television; In the Hall of the Mountain King performed by Tadeusz Wojciechowski & Polish Radio Symphony Orchestra |
| 2020–2021 | Speechless (from Aladdin) by Alan Menken performed by Naomi Scott | Peer Gynt Suite No.1, Op. 46 by Edvard Grieg; Morning Mood performed by Gennady Rozhdestvensky & Grand Symphony Orchestra of the All-Union Radio and Central Television; In the Hall of the Mountain King performed by Tadeusz Wojciechowski & Polish Radio Symphony Orchestra |

== Competitive highlights ==
- TBD – Placement to be decided

Competition placements at junior level
| Season | 2023–24 | 2024–25 | 2025–26 |
|---|---|---|---|
| Russian Championships | 1st | 9th | 5th |
| Russian Grand Prix Final | 2nd | 3rd | |
| Russian GP Stage 1 | 1st | | |
| Russian GP Stage 2 | | | 1st |
| Russian GP Stage 3 | | 1st | |
| Russian GP Stage 4 | 1st | | 6th |
| Russian GP Stage 6 | | 4th | |

== Detailed results ==
=== Junior level ===
Results in the 2023–24 season
| Date | Event | SP | | FS | | Total | |
| Date | Event | P | Score | P | Score | P | Score |
|---|---|---|---|---|---|---|---|
| 4–7 Sep 2023 | (Russia) 2023 Moscow Championships | 9 | 63.62 | 1 | 145.72 | 2 | 209.34 |
| 10–14 Oct 2023 | (Russia) 2023 Russian Grand Prix I, Ufa | 1 | 73.39 | 1 | 155.20 | 1 | 228.59 |
| 8–11 Nov 2023 | (Russia) 2023 Russian Grand Prix IV, Kazan | 1 | 72.06 | 1 | 158.70 | 1 | 230.76 |
| 5–9 Feb 2024 | (Russia) 2024 Russian Junior Championships | 1 | 74.30 | 1 | 170.89 | 1 | 245.19 |
| 13–16 Mar 2024 | (Russia) 2024 Russian Grand Prix Final | 12 | 62.20 | 1 | 160.29 | 2 | 222.49 |

Results in the 2024–25 season
| Date | Event | SP | | FS | | Total | |
| Date | Event | P | Score | P | Score | P | Score |
|---|---|---|---|---|---|---|---|
| 1–5 Oct 2024 | (Russia) 2024 N. A. Panin's Memorial | 4 | 70.56 | 1 | 168.42 | 1 | 238.98 |
| 30 Oct – 1 Nov 2024 | (Russia) 2024 Russian Grand Prix III, Kazan | 1 | 75.11 | 1 | 169.09 | 1 | 244.20 |
| 20–22 Nov 2024 | (Russia) 2024 Russian Grand Prix VI, Saint Petersburg | 3 | 70.33 | 4 | 132.75 | 4 | 203.08 |
| 5–9 Feb 2025 | (Russia) 2025 Russian Junior Championships | 2 | 74.35 | 15 | 119.96 | 9 | 194.31 |
| 27 Feb – 2 Mar 2025 | (Russia) 2025 Russian Grand Prix Final | 2 | 72.83 | 4 | 147.21 | 3 | 220.04 |
| 27 Feb – 2 Mar 2025 | (Russia) 2025 Moscow Championships | 24 | 57.78 | 1 | 159.69 | 4 | 217.47 |

Results in the 2025–26 season
| Date | Event | SP | | FS | | Total | |
| Date | Event | P | Score | P | Score | P | Score |
|---|---|---|---|---|---|---|---|
| 22–24 Oct 2025 | (Russia) 2025 Russian Grand Prix II, Magnitogorsk | 3 | 61.95 | 2 | 135.92 | 1 | 197.87 |
| 5–7 Nov 2025 | (Russia) 2025 Russian Grand Prix IV, Kazan | 15 | 51.98 | 1 | 132.29 | 6 | 184.27 |
| 4–8 Feb 2026 | (Russia) 2026 Russian Junior Championships | 4 | 68.67 | 5 | 135.61 | 5 | 204.28 |
