= Elena Kostyleva =

Russian figure skater (born 2011)

- Kostyleva at the 2024 Grand Prix of Russia stage in Kazan

Personal information
- Native name: Елена Валерьевна Костылева
- Full name: Elena Valerievna Kostyleva
- Born: 11 October 2011 (age 15) Voronezh, Russia
- Home town: Moscow, Russia

Figure skating career
- Country: (Individual Neutral Athletes) Individual Neutral Athlete; Russia
- Discipline: Women's singles
- Coach: Evgeni Plushenko
- Skating club: Angels of Plushenko Academy
- Began skating: 2015

Elena Valerievna Kostyleva (Russian: Елена Валерьевна Костылева; born 11 October 2011) is a Russian figure skater. She is a two-time Russian junior national champion (2025, 2026).

Kostyleva has landed the triple Axel and quadruple jumps in domestic competition.

== Personal life ==
Elena Kostyleva was born 11 October 2011 in Voronezh, Russia. She has an older sister. Due to of being born premature and developing bronchitis at the age of four months, Elena spent the first year of her life in the hospital.

During this time, she and her family lived in Rossosh, Voronezh Oblast before eventually moving to Moscow in 2018 so Kostyleva could pursue her skating career.

== Career ==
=== Early years ===
In order to improve her health, Kostyleva began learning how to skate at the age of three while living in Rossosh, Voronezh Oblast. After showing promise, she transferred to the Olympic Reserve School in Voronezh. In 2018, she moved to Moscow. Kostyleva trained under a number of coaches during her early years in the sport – including Sergei Davydov, Eteri Tutberidze (on two separate occasions), Vadim Raevsky, and Viktoria Butsaeva (née Volchkova). In December 2022, she joined Igor Lyutikov's group at SSOR “Moskvich”.

=== 2023–2024 season ===
In January 2024, she took the individual bronze at the Russian Figure Skating Jumping Championships, behind Margarita Bazyliuk and Adeliia Petrosian.

In March 2024, she left coach, Igor Lyutikov to train under Evgeni Plushenko at the Angels of Plushenko Academy.

Kostyleva at the 2024 Russian Grand Prix stage in Kazan

=== 2024–2025 season ===
Kostyleva was given two Russian Cup assignments – she placed 1st at Stage 4 in Krasnoyarsk and 2nd at Stage 5 in Moscow. These medal placements qualified her for the upcoming 2025 Russian Junior Grand Prix Final.

In February 2025, she won the Russian Junior Championships with 233.10 points, ahead of Alisa Dvoeglazova with 231.56 and Sofia Dzepka with 218.38, and the 2025 Russian Junior Grand Prix Final.

=== 2025–2026 season ===
In September 2025, she won the Moscow Oblast Championships, despite having skipped her summer training due to an injury. On 21 November, she, unexpectedly, didn't win the Russian Grand Prix stage in Omsk, finishing with less than 200 points.

In late December 2025, she left Plushenko's figure skating academy after a conflict Kostyleva's mother had with Plushenko. She switched to train with Sofia Fedchenko and lived with her temporarily. Nevertheless, she continued to perform in Plushenko's commercial ice show Sleeping Beauty, playing the role of Aurora.

In January, she returned to Plushenko after Kostyleva's mother had a conflict with Sofia Fedchenko. "We all live and do everything for our children. For the sake of Lena, and only for her, we erased all the negativity from our lives and overstepped all our principles," shares Evgeni Plushenko.

In February 2026, she won the Russian Junior Championships for the second time in a row. She subsequently withdrew from the 2026 Russian Junior Grand Prix Final due to injury.

=== 2026–2027 season ===
On 30 June 2026, the International Skating Union announced that figure skaters from Russia and Belarus would be allowed to compete at international competitions as Individual Neutral Athletes (AINs). Each of these skaters are be required to undergo an individual assessment conducted by the ISU Council to determine whether they meet the criteria for neutral status. Kostyleva's application was approved, making her eligible to compete internationally as a neutral athlete.

Kostyleva was assigned to the Junior Grand Prix stage in China and Thailand. Shortly after being assigned, the Figure Skating Federation of Russia announced that Elena would withdraw from the stage in China due to injuring her right gluteal muscle after multiple falls while working to restore her quad jumps.; her spots for both China and Thailand were given to the first substitute Sofia Dzepka.

In October it was reported by the management of Angles of Plushenko that Kostyleva had not resumed to full training. They revealed that Kostyleva had been preparing to compete on the ISU Challenger Series stages in Ankara and Istanbul but her hip injury resurfaced. "Unfortunately, Lena's hip problem resurfaced recently. The symptoms are the same as after the practice sessions. We examined Lena, and she has now completed a comprehensive course of treatment. Currently, the doctors are not allowing her to jump or train for another 21 days to avoid further aggravating her hip condition."

In late October she returned to Plushenko for training, and was reported to be fully recovered from her injury. In early November, it was reported that the academy revoked Kostyleva's monthly scholarship of 65,000 roubles (about $800) due to her mother violating the agreed contract that included the conditions not to post negative comments about the academy and not to train at other skating rinks.

== Controversies ==
=== Yoghurt incident ===
One day in June 2021, Kostyleva was seen by Eteri Tutberidze holding two yoghurts, while eating more than one constituted a dietary violation. Kostyleva defended herself by saying that the second one was intended for another skater, Margarita Bazyliuk, but the latter denied having asked Kostyleva to take one for her from the cafeteria. As the result, Kostyleva allegedly fell of out of favor with Tutberitze and was eventually forced to change the coach. The incident was widely discussed in the Russian press. In the autumn of 2023, Bazyliuk was asked about that incident and replied: "I didn't ask her to bring the yogurt. That's it." According to yet another skater from Tutberidze's group, there weren't only yoghurts involved, there were also cereals, succades and other sweets.

=== Mother's over-involvement ===
Kostyleva's mother, Irina Kostyleva, has been criticized for over-involvement in her daughter's training. In November 2025, Plushenko's wife, producer Yana Rudkovskaya, published a CCTV video in which Irina allegedly hit her daughter on the premises of the Plushenko's academy rink. Moreover, Plushenko filed an official complaint with Maria Lvova-Belova, the Russian Presidential Commissioner for Children's Rights, reporting Irina's abuse of her daughter. About a month later, Elena Kostyleva left Plushenko to train with Sofia Fedchenko, but returned to him in January. "He is my favorite person, the coach for life," she commented on her return.

== Programs ==
Season	Short program	Free skating
2026–2027	Boléro by Maurice Ravel performed by Charles Munch & Boston Symphony Orchestra choreo. by Ivan Bukin	Perfection (from Black Swan) by Clint Mansell choreo. by Ilia Averbukh
2025–2026	Voilà (Live) by Barbara Pravi performed by André Rieu, Johann Strauss Orchestra, & Emma Kok choreo. by Alena Kostornaia; Poker Face; Bad Romance by Lady Gaga choreo. by Ekaterina Mitrofanova	Peer Gynt Suite No.1, Op. 46 by Edvard Grieg; Morning Mood performed by Jajangnam; In the Hall of the Mountain King performed by Vienna Orchestra choreo. by Ekaterina Mitrofanova
2024–2025	Voilà (Live) by Barbara Pravi performed by André Rieu, Johann Strauss Orchestra, & Emma Kok choreo. by Alena Kostornaia	Toccata and Fugue in D minor, BWV 565 by Johann Sebastian Bach performed by Vanessa-Mae, Royal Philharmonic Orchestra, & Mike Batt choreo. by Nikita Mikhailov
2023–2024	Sway by Pablo Beltrán Ruiz performed by Melinda Doolittle; Perfidia (from Shall We Dance?) by John Altman	Malagueña by Ernesto Lecuona performed by Stanley Black
2022–2023	Sway by Pablo Beltrán Ruiz performed by Melinda Doolittle; Perfidia (from Shall We Dance?) by John Altman	Malagueña by Ernesto Lecuona performed by Stanley Black
2021–2022	Winter, I. Allegro non molto (from The Four Seasons) by Antonio Vivaldi performed by Henryk Szeryng & English Chamber Orchestra	Spartacus by Aram Khachaturian; Act I: "The Triumph of Rome": No. 1 Triumphal March performed by Gennady Rozhdestvensky & Grand Symphony Orchestra of the All-Union Radio and Central Television; Act III: Adagio of Spartacus and Phrygia; Act I: Etruscan Dance performed by Michail Jurowski, RIAS Kammerchor & Deutsches Symphonie-Orchester Berlin
2020–2021	Winter, I. Allegro non molto (from The Four Seasons) by Antonio Vivaldi performed by Henryk Szeryng & English Chamber Orchestra	Spartacus by Aram Khachaturian; Act I: "The Triumph of Rome": No. 1 Triumphal March performed by Gennady Rozhdestvensky & Grand Symphony Orchestra of the All-Union Radio and Central Television; Act III: Adagio of Spartacus and Phrygia; Act I: Etruscan Dance performed by Michail Jurowski, RIAS Kammerchor & Deutsches Symphonie-Orchester Berlin
2019–2020	L-O-V-E by Nat King Cole performed by Natalie Cole	La La Land; Mia and Sebastian's Theme; Another Day of Sun; Epilogue by Justin Hurwitz performed by La La Land Cast

== Competitive highlights ==
- JGP – Event of the ISU Grand Prix Series
- TBD – Assigned

=== Skating for Russia ===
Competition placements at junior level
Season	2024–25	2025–26	2026–27
Russian Championships	1st	1st	
Russian Grand Prix Final	1st		
Russian GP Stage 4	1st		
Russian GP Stage 5	2nd	1st	
Russian GP Stage 6		2nd	

== Detailed results ==
=== Junior level ===
Results in the 2024–25 season
Date	Event	SP		FS		Total	
Date	Event	P	Score	P	Score	P	Score
20–22 Sep 2024	(Russia) 2024 Moscow Championships	1	63.70	1	139.04	1	202.74
23–25 Sep 2024	(Russia) 2024 Junior Grinkov Memorial	1	74.79	1	153.06	1	227.85
6–11 Nov 2024	(Russia) 2024 Russian Grand Prix IV, Krasnoyarsk	2	71.74	1	158.89	1	230.63
13–18 Nov 2024	(Russia) 2024 Russian Grand Prix V, Moscow	2	72.62	2	150.95	2	223.57
5–9 Feb 2025	(Russia) 2025 Russian Junior Championships	1	74.57	1	158.53	1	233.10
27 Feb – 2 Mar 2025	(Russia) 2025 Russian Grand Prix Final	4	68.86	1	161.48	1	230.34

Results in the 2025–26 season
Date	Event	SP		FS		Total	
Date	Event	P	Score	P	Score	P	Score
25–26 Oct 2025	(Russia) 2025 Moscow Championships	1	65.69	1	161.04	1	226.73
11–17 Nov 2025	(Russia) 2025 Russian Grand Prix V, Moscow	4	63.50	1	152.06	1	215.56
19–21 Nov 2025	(Russia) 2025 Russian Grand Prix VI, Omsk	1	69.42	2	130.13	2	199.55
19–22 Jan 2026	(Russia) 2026 P.S. Grushman Memorial	2	69.34	12	119.11	9	188.45
4–8 Feb 2026	(Russia) 2025 Russian Junior Championships	1	71.16	1	157.37	1	228.53
