= Russian–Chinese Winter Youth Games =

Winter sports competition

Russian–Chinese Winter Youth Games (Russian: Российско-Китайские молодёжные зимние игры, Chinese: 中俄冬季青少年运动会) is a regional winter sports competition, where China and Russia are the participants of the games. The first edition of the games was held in Harbin, China's Heilongjiang province in 2016, while the latest and third edition is scheduled to be held in December 2022.

== Sports ==
- Alpine skiing
- Cross-country skiing
- Curling
- Figure skating
- Freestyle skiing
- Short-track speed skating
- Snowboarding
- Speed skating

=== Former ===
- Ice hockey

== Editions ==
1. Harbin, China (2016): 2016 Russian–Chinese Winter Youth Games
2. Ufa, Russia (2018): 2018 Russian–Chinese Winter Youth Games
3. Changchun, China (2022): 2022 Russian–Chinese Winter Youth Games
4. Yuzhno-Sakhalinsk, Russia (2025): 2025 Russian–Chinese Winter Youth Games

== Medal table (2016-2025) ==
The medal table is as listed as follows:

Rank	Nation	Gold	Silver	Bronze	Total
1	Russia	97	88	81	266
2	China	39	45	35	119
Totals (2 entries)		136	133	116	385

== See also ==
- China-Russia Expo
- China-Russia Friendship Association
- 9th Russian–Chinese Summer Youth Games 2023
