= 2022 Russian Figure Skating Championships =

- Type: National championship
- Date: 21–26 December 2021 (S); 18–22 January 2022 (J)
- Season: 2021–22
- Location: Saint Petersburg (S); Saransk (J)
- Host: Figure Skating Federation of Russia
- Venue: Yubileyny Sports Palace (S); Ice Palace of the Republic of Mordovia (J)

Champions
- Men's singles: Mark Kondratiuk (S); Ilya Yablokov (J)
- Women's singles: Alexandra Trusova (S); Sofia Akateva (J)
- Pairs: Anastasia Mishina / Aleksandr Galliamov (S); Natalia Khabibullina / Ilya Knyazhuk (J)
- Ice dance: Alexandra Stepanova / Ivan Bukin (S); Irina Khavronina / Dario Cirisano (J)
- Previous: 2021 Russian Championships
- Next: 2023 Russian Championships

The 2022 Russian Figure Skating Championships (Russian: Чемпионат России по фигурному катанию на коньках 2022) were held from 21 to 26 December 2021 in Saint Petersburg. Medals were awarded in the disciplines of men's singles, women's singles, pairs, and ice dance. The results were among the criteria used to select Russia's teams to the 2022 European Championships and 2022 Winter Olympics.

Kamila Valieva was stripped of her gold medal in Senior Women's singles after testing positive for Trimetazidine, a banned substance, on the second day of the Women's competition. Subsequently, Alexandra Trusova became the gold medalist, with Anna Shcherbakova moving up to silver and Adeliia Petrosian receiving the bronze medal.

== Competitions ==
In the 2021–22 season, Russian skaters competed in domestic qualifying events and national championships for various age levels. The Russian Cup series will lead to three events – the Russian Championships, the Russian Junior Championships, and the Russian Cup Final.

Date	Event	Type	Location	Details
22–26 September 2021	1st stage of Russian Cup	Qualifier	Syzran, Samara Oblast	Details
10–14 October 2021	2nd stage of Russian Cup	Qualifier	Yoshkar-Ola, Mari El	Details
24–28 October 2021	3rd stage of Russian Cup	Qualifier	Sochi, Krasnodar Krai	Details
8–12 November 2021	4th stage of Russian Cup	Qualifier	Kazan, Tatarstan	Details
17–21 November 2021	5th stage of Russian Cup	Qualifier	Perm, Perm Oblast	Details
21–26 December 2021	2022 Russian Championships	Final	Saint Petersburg	Details
18–22 January 2022	2022 Russian Junior Championships	Final	Saransk, Mordovia	Details
23–27 February 2022	2022 Russian Cup Final	Final	Saransk, Mordovia	Details
1–5 March 2022	2022 Russian Youth Championships – Younger Age	Final	Yoshkar-Ola, Mari El	Details
1–5 April 2022	2022 Russian Youth Championships – Elder Age	Final	Veliky Novgorod, Novgorod Oblast	Details

== Medalists of most important competitions ==
Senior Championships
Discipline	Gold	Silver	Bronze
Men	Mark Kondratiuk	Mikhail Kolyada	Andrei Mozalev
Women	Alexandra Trusova	Anna Shcherbakova	Adeliia Petrosian
Pairs	Anastasia Mishina / Aleksandr Galliamov	Aleksandra Boikova / Dmitrii Kozlovskii	Evgenia Tarasova / Vladimir Morozov
Ice dance	Alexandra Stepanova / Ivan Bukin	Diana Davis / Gleb Smolkin	Elizaveta Khudaiberdieva / Egor Bazin
Junior Championships
Discipline	Gold	Silver	Bronze
Men	Ilya Yablokov	Nikolai Ugozhaev	Artem Kovalev
Women	Sofia Akatyeva	Sofia Samodelkina	Sofia Muravieva
Pairs	Natalia Khabibullina / Ilya Knyazhuk	Iuliia Artemeva / Mikhail Nazarychev	Ekaterina Chikmareva / Matvei Ianchenkov
Ice dance	Irina Khavronina / Dario Cirisano	Vasilisa Kaganovskaia / Valeriy Angelopol	Sofya Tyutyunina / Alexander Shustitskiy
Cup Final
Discipline	Gold	Silver	Bronze
Men	Makar Ignatov	Alexey Erokhov	Matvei Vetlugin
Women	Veronika Yametova	Veronika Peterimova	Anastasia Morozova
Pairs	Anastasia Mukhortova / Dmitry Evgenyev	Ekaterina Geynish / Ilya Mironov	Alina Solovyova / Elisey Ivanov
Ice dance	Ekaterina Mironova / Evgenii Ustenko	Elizaveta Pasechnik / Dmitry Blinov	Vlada Pavlenina / Aleksandr Aleksanyan
Junior men	Vladislav Dikidzhi	Artem Kovalev	Ivan Popov
Junior women	Sofia Akateva	Adeliia Petrosian	Alisa Dvoeglazova
Junior pairs	Natalia Khabibullina / Ilya Knyazhuk	Ekaterina Petushkova / Evgenii Malikov	Varvara Cheremnykh / Daniil Butenko
Junior ice dance	Vasilisa Kaganovskaia / Valeriy Angelopol	Olga Mamchenkova / Mark Volkov	Anna Shcherbakova / Egor Goncharov
Youth Championships – Elder Age
Discipline	Gold	Silver	Bronze
Men	Arseny Fedotov	Fedor Zonov	Mikhail Polyanskiy
Women	Maria Gordeeva	Veronika Yametova	Alina Gorbacheva
Pairs	Maya Shegay / Igor Shamshurov	Varvara Cheremnykh / Daniil Butenko	Anastasia Egorova / Rodion Marinskiy
Ice dance	Anna Rumak / Gleb Goncharov	Anna Kolomenskaya / Artem Frolov	Sofia Aleksova / Ilya Vladimirov
Youth Championships – Younger Age
Discipline	Gold	Silver	Bronze
Men	Lev Lazarev	Arseny Fedotov	Mikhail Tikhonov
Women	Maria Gordeeva	Yuliana Cherenyova	Victoria Morozova
Pairs	No pairs' discipline		
Ice dance	No ice dance discipline		

== Senior Championships ==
The 2022 Russian Championships were held in Saint Petersburg from 21 to 26 December 2021. Competitors qualified through international success or by competing in the Russian Cup series' senior-level events.

There are three separate basis for qualification.
1. Qualification based on receiving 2021–22 Grand Prix assignment.
2. Qualification based on qualifying for the 2021–22 Junior Grand Prix Final. However, skaters must have been born before July 1, 2007 to be qualified for the Russian senior championships. In addition, junior ice dance teams do not compete at senior national championships due to different program requirements between the junior and senior levels. Consequently, ice dance teams cannot use their junior level programs for senior competition.
3. Qualification based on Russian Cup series' results.

=== Schedule ===
Listed in local time (UTC+03:00).

Day	Date	Start	Finish	Discipline	Event
Day 1	23 December	13:15	15:45	Men	Short program
Day 1	23 December	16:05	18:00	Ice dance	Rhythm dance
Day 1	23 December	18:20	18:50		Opening ceremony
Day 1	23 December	19:05	21:00	Pairs	Short program
Day 2	24 December	12:45	14:55	Ice dance	Free dance
Day 2	24 December	15:15	18:00	Men	Free skating
Day 2	24 December	18:20	20:50	Women	Short program
Day 3	25 December	15:30	17:40	Pairs	Free skating
Day 3	25 December	18:00	20:50	Women	Free skating
Day 4	26 December	13:00	13:45		Victory ceremonies
Day 4	26 December	14:00	16:30		Exhibition gala

=== Preliminary entries ===
The Figure Skating Federation of Russia published the official list of participants on 16 December 2021.

Men	Women	Pairs	Ice dance
Mikhail Kolyada	Anna Shcherbakova	Anastasia Mishina / Aleksandr Galliamov	Victoria Sinitsina / Nikita Katsalapov
Evgeni Semenenko	Elizaveta Tuktamysheva	Aleksandra Boikova / Dmitrii Kozlovskii	Alexandra Stepanova / Ivan Bukin
Makar Ignatov	Alexandra Trusova	Evgenia Tarasova / Vladimir Morozov	Tiffany Zahorski / Jonathan Guerreiro
Mark Kondratiuk	Kamila Valieva	Daria Pavliuchenko / Denis Khodykin	Anastasia Skoptsova / Kirill Aleshin
Andrei Mozalev	~~Daria Usacheva~~ (withdrew)	Yasmina Kadyrova / Ivan Balchenko	~~Sofia Shevchenko / Igor Eremenko~~ (withdrew)
Alexander Samarin	Maya Khromykh	Iuliia Artemeva / Mikhail Nazarychev	Elizaveta Khudaiberdieva / Egor Bazin
Petr Gumennik	Sofia Samodurova	~~Alina Pepeleva / Roman Pleshkov~~ (withdrew)	Annabelle Morozov / Andrei Bagin
Dmitri Aliev	~~Alena Kostornaia~~ (withdrew)	Anastasia Mukhortova / Dmitry Evgenyev	Elizaveta Shanaeva / Devid Naryzhnyy
Artur Danielian	Kseniia Sinitsyna	Ekaterina Chikmareva / Matvei Ianchenkov	Diana Davis / Gleb Smolkin
~~Daniil Samsonov~~ (withdrew)	Adeliia Petrosian	Natalia Khabibullina / Ilya Knyazhuk	Angelina Lazareva / Maxim Prokofiev
Kirill Sarnovskiy	Sofia Muravieva	Ekaterina Petushkova / Evgenii Malikov	Vlada Pavlenina / Aleksandr Aleksanyan
Gleb Lutfullin	Anastasia Zinina	Ekaterina Geynish / Ilya Mironov	Elizaveta Pasechnik / Dmitry Blinov
Ilya Yablokov	Sofia Samodelkina		Ksenia Ermakova / Vladislav Panteleyev
Egor Rukhin	Veronika Yametova		Ekaterina Mironova / Evgenii Ustenko
Alexey Erokhov	Anastasia Morozova		~~Ekaterina Khrabrykh / Miron Suslov~~ (withdrew)
Andrei Anisimov	Valeria Shulskaya		
Roman Savosin	Veronika Peterimova		
Vladislav Dikidzhi	Ksenia Gushchina		
Substitutes
Artem Kovalev (added)	~~Anastasiia Guliakova~~ (added, but later withdrew)	Karina Akopova / Nikita Rakhmanin (added)	Sofia Kartashova / Ilya Karpov
Roman Atoyar	Polina Sviridenko (added)	Nadezhda Labazina / Alexei Sviatchenko	Elizaveta Kirillova / Mark Chegodaev
Artem Lezheev	Arina Onishchenko (added)	Polina Popova / Ilya Krasnikov	Olga Voronina / Aleksey Ivanov
Andrei Lazukin	Stanislava Molchanova	Alina Solovyova / Elisey Ivanov	Arina Ushakova / Maxim Nekrasov (added)

==== Changes to preliminary entries ====
Date	Discipline	Withdrew	Added	Reason/Other notes	Refs
13 December	Men	Daniil Samsonov	Artem Kovalev	Recovery from Osgood-Schlatter disease	
13 December	Women	Alena Kostornaia	Anastasiia Guliakova	Recovery from right hand fracture	
15 December	Women	Daria Usacheva	Polina Sviridenko	Recovery from right hip injury	
16 December	Pairs	Alina Pepeleva / Roman Pleshkov	Karina Akopova / Nikita Rakhmanin	Complication in the knee after flu (Pleshkov)	
16 December	Ice dance	Sofia Shevchenko / Igor Eremenko	Arina Ushakova / Maxim Nekrasov	Medical issues	
16 December	Ice dance	Ekaterina Khrabrykh / Miron Suslov	None		
20 December	Women	Anastasiia Guliakova	Arina Onishchenko	Right ankle injury	

=== Results ===
==== Men ====
Rank	Name	Total points	SP		FS	
1	Mark Kondratiuk	284.37	2	97.77	3	186.60
2	Mikhail Kolyada	283.70	5	94.26	1	189.44
3	Andrei Mozalev	278.28	8	90.98	2	187.30
4	Evgeni Semenenko	274.28	1	98.03	5	176.25
5	Petr Gumennik	267.45	7	91.04	4	176.41
6	Alexander Samarin	264.73	6	94.23	6	170.50
7	Alexey Erokhov	261.48	4	95.24	8	166.24
8	Gleb Lutfullin	251.53	11	86.87	10	164.66
9	Dmitri Aliev	251.40	12	86.40	9	165.00
10	Makar Ignatov	250.77	3	95.84	14	154.93
11	Vladislav Dikidzhi	250.17	15	82.24	7	167.93
12	Artem Kovalev	249.07	10	87.14	11	161.93
13	Artur Danielian	248.35	9	87.74	12	160.61
14	Ilya Yablokov	243.71	13	85.40	13	158.31
15	Roman Savosin	225.40	14	82.64	16	142.76
16	Kirill Sarnovskiy	221.92	16	80.31	17	141.61
17	Andrei Anisimov	213.08	17	65.34	15	147.74
18	Egor Rukhin	184.95	18	64.85	18	120.10

==== Women ====
- The former winner Kamila Valieva was disqualified for violation of anti-doping rules.

Rank	Name	Total points	SP		FS	
1	Alexandra Trusova	248.65	4	74.21	1	174.44
2	Anna Shcherbakova	239.56	1	81.46	3	158.10
3	Adeliia Petrosian	233.97	5	73.29	2	160.68
4	Sofia Samodelkina	233.09	3	76.74	4	156.35
5	Sofia Muravieva	230.31	2	80.87	6	149.44
6	Elizaveta Tuktamysheva	224.40	6	71.28	5	153.12
7	Maya Khromykh	217.18	8	69.36	7	147.82
8	Kseniia Sinitsyna	204.61	7	70.75	8	133.86
9	Veronika Yametova	191.37	14	59.72	9	131.65
10	Sofia Samodurova	184.26	10	68.30	13	115.96
11	Anastasia Zinina	181.45	9	68.94	14	112.51
12	Valeria Shulskaia	180.92	12	61.63	10	119.29
13	Anastasia Morozova	180.57	11	62.28	11	118.29
14	Ksenia Gushchina	171.62	17	53.61	12	118.01
15	Polina Sviridenko	166.02	15	59.05	14	106.97
16	Arina Onishchenko	163.56	16	57.51	16	106.05
17	Veronika Peterimova	155.40	13	61.18	17	94.22
DSQ *	Kamila Valieva	~~283.48~~	DSQ	~~90.38~~	DSQ	~~193.10~~

==== Pairs ====
Rank	Name	Total points	SP		FS	
1	Anastasia Mishina / Aleksandr Galliamov	243.74	1	83.74	1	160.00
2	Aleksandra Boikova / Dmitrii Kozlovskii	239.87	2	82.84	2	157.03
3	Evgenia Tarasova / Vladimir Morozov	228.20	3	78.68	3	149.52
4	Daria Pavliuchenko / Denis Khodykin	220.18	5	75.40	4	144.78
5	Iuliia Artemeva / Mikhail Nazarychev	213.19	4	76.26	6	136.93
6	Karina Akopova / Nikita Rakhmanin	210.77	7	73.06	5	137.71
7	Natalia Khabibullina / Ilya Knyazhuk	195.86	8	71.35	9	124.51
8	Ekaterina Chikmareva / Matvei Ianchenkov	195.83	9	68.44	8	127.39
9	Yasmina Kadyrova / Ivan Balchenko	188.90	6	73.77	10	115.13
10	Anastasia Mukhortova / Dmitry Evgenyev	187.94	12	59.88	7	128.06
11	Ekaterina Geynish / Ilya Mironov	176.33	11	65.78	11	110.55
12	Ekaterina Petushkova / Evgenii Malikov	166.15	10	67.27	12	98.88

==== Ice dance ====
Rank	Name	Total points	RD		FD	
1	Alexandra Stepanova / Ivan Bukin	223.37	2	88.76	1	134.61
2	Diana Davis / Gleb Smolkin	207.70	3	83.99	2	123.71
3	Elizaveta Khudaiberdieva / Egor Bazin	195.75	6	77.91	3	117.84
4	Annabelle Morozov / Andrei Bagin	195.65	5	78.02	4	117.63
5	Elizaveta Shanaeva / Devid Naryzhnyy	187.19	8	74.83	5	112.36
6	Anastasia Skoptsova / Kirill Aleshin	185.72	7	75.36	6	110.36
7	Arina Ushakova / Maxim Nekrasov	180.23	9	70.27	7	109.96
8	Tiffany Zahorski / Jonathan Guerreiro	179.50	4	79.36	9	100.14
9	Elizaveta Pasechnik / Dmitry Blinov	166.48	10	66.23	8	100.25
10	Ekaterina Mironova / Evgenii Ustenko	163.29	11	64.28	10	99.01
11	Vlada Pavlenina / Aleksandr Aleksanyan	154.24	12	61.58	12	92.66
12	Angelina Lazareva / Maxim Prokofiev	152.49	13	57.84	11	94.65
13	Ksenia Ermakova / Vladislav Panteleyev	112.17	14	44.99	13	67.18
WD	Victoria Sinitsina / Nikita Katsalapov	withdrew	1	93.61	withdrew from competition	

== Junior Championships ==
The 2022 Russian Junior Championships (Russian: Первенство России среди юниоров 2022) were held in Saransk, Mordovia on 18–22 January 2022 (originally it were scheduled on 1–5 February 2022). Competitors qualified through international success or by competing in the Russian Cup series' junior-level events. The results of the Junior Championships were supposed to be part of the selection criteria for the 2022 World Junior Championships.

There are two separate basis for qualification.
1. Qualification based on competing at the 2021–22 Junior Grand Prix series.
2. Qualification based on Russian Cup series' junior-level results.
In addition, figure skaters who were included in the official pre-season national team roster but were unable to participate at the 2021–22 Junior Grand Prix series and/or Russian Cup junior-level series due to good reasons, can be included into list of participants by decision of the executive committee of the Figure Skating Federation of Russia.

=== Schedule ===
Listed in local time (UTC+03:00).

Day	Date	Start	Finish	Discipline	Event
Day 1	20 January	14:00	16:25	Men	Short program
Day 1	20 January	16:40	17:10		Opening ceremony
Day 1	20 January	17:25	19:50	Women	Short program
Day 1	20 January	20:05	22:15	Ice dance	Rhythm dance
Day 2	21 January	13:15	15:50	Men	Free skating
Day 2	21 January	16:05	18:40	Women	Free skating
Day 2	21 January	18:50	19:20		Victory ceremonies
Day 2	21 January	19:35	21:20	Pairs	Short program
Day 3	22 January	12:00	14:20	Ice dance	Free dance
Day 3	22 January	14:40	16:35	Pairs	Free skating
Day 3	22 January	17:00	17:30		Victory ceremonies

=== Preliminary entries ===
The Figure Skating Federation of Russia published the official list of participants on 14 January 2022.

Men	Women	Pairs	Ice dance
Ilya Yablokov	Sofia Akateva	Ekaterina Chikmareva / Matvei Ianchenkov	Irina Khavronina / Dario Cirisano
~~Gleb Lutfullin~~ (withdrew)	Veronika Zhilina	Natalia Khabibullina / Ilya Knyazhuk	Vasilisa Kaganovskaia / Valeriy Angelopol
Kirill Sarnovskiy	Sofia Muravieva	Anastasia Mukhortova / Dmitry Evgenyev	Sofya Tyutyunina / Alexander Shustitskiy
Egor Rukhin	Adeliia Petrosian	Ekaterina Petushkova / Evgenii Malikov	Sofia Leonteva / Daniil Gorelkin
Artem Kovalev	Anastasia Zinina	Polina Kostiukovich / Aleksei Briukhanov	Ekaterina Rybakova / Ivan Makhnonosov
Fedor Zonov	Sofia Samodelkina	Ekaterina Storublevtseva / Artem Gritsaenko	~~Olga Mamchenkova / Mark Volkov~~ (withdrew)
Andrei Anisimov	Elizaveta Kulikova	Kseniia Akhanteva / Valerii Kolesov	Sofiia Kachushkina / Oleg Muratov
~~Aleksandr Golubev~~ (withdrew)	Mariia Zakharova	Ekaterina Geynish / Ilya Mironov	Margarita Svistunova / Dmitrii Studenikin
Ivan Popov	~~Elizaveta Berestovskaia~~ (withdrew)	Anna Kireeva / Ilya Ivanov	~~Elizaveta Shichina / Gordey Khubulov~~ (withdrew)
Nikolai Ugozhaev	Sofya Titova	Varvara Cheremnykh / Daniil Butenko	Alisa Ovsiankina / Matvei Samokhin
Nikolay Kolesnikov	Alina Gorbacheva	~~Evgenia Tumanova / Georgiy Kunitsa~~ (withdrew)	Ekaterina Katashinskaya / Matvei Grachyov
Kirill Andrusik	Alisa Dvoeglazova	Maya Shegay / Igor Shamshurov (withdrew, but later added)	Anna Shcherbakova / Egor Goncharov
Grigory Fedorov	Victoria Morozova		Sofia Aleksova / Ilya Vladimirov
Maxim Belyavsky	Nadezhda Ponteleenko		Polina Kocherygina / Evgeni Artyushchenko
Eduard Karartynian	Natalia Lagutova		Taisiia Linchevskaia / Timur Babaev-Smirnov
Timofei Platonov	Inga Gurgenidze		
Dmitry Shelkovnikov	Lyubov Rubtsova		
Daniil Fedosimov (withdrew, but later added)	Sofia Zakharova		
Substitutes	Substitutes	Substitutes	Substitutes
Makar Puzin (added)	Ulyana Shiryaeva (added)	Anastasia Egorova / Rodion Marinsky	Nika Daineko / Aleksandr Vaskovich
Vladislav Dikidzhi (added)	Sofia Vazhnova	Alisa Rodionova / Aleksey Karpov	Anna Kolomenskaya / Artem Frolov (added)
		Iuliia Artemeva / Mikhail Nazarychev (added)	Elizaveta Maleina / Grigory Rodin (added)

==== Changes to preliminary entries ====
Date	Discipline	Withdrew	Added	Reason/Other notes	Refs
14 January	Men	Daniil Fedosimov	Vladislav Dikidzhi	Decision of the executive committee of the FSR	
14 January	Pairs	Maya Shegay / Igor Shamshurov	Iuliia Artemeva / Mikhail Nazarychev	Decision of the executive committee of the FSR	
17 January	Men	Aleksandr Golubev	Daniil Fedosimov	Recovery after two operations due to injury	
17 January	Women	Elizaveta Berestovskaia	Ulyana Shiryaeva	Recovery from back injury	
17 January	Pairs	Evgenia Tumanova / Georgiy Kunitsa	Maya Shegay / Igor Shamshurov		
17 January	Ice dance	Olga Mamchenkova / Mark Volkov	Anna Kolomenskaya / Artem Frolov		
18 January	Men	Gleb Lutfullin	Makar Puzin	Sickness	
18 January	Ice dance	Elizaveta Shichina / Gordey Khubulov	Elizaveta Maleina / Grigory Rodin		

=== Results ===
==== Men ====
Rank	Name	Total points	SP		FS	
1	Ilya Yablokov	227.99	3	83.22	4	144.77
2	Nikolai Ugozhaev	227.82	6	79.87	3	147.95
3	Artem Kovalev	225.65	2	85.02	5	140.63
4	Nikolay Kolesnikov	224.96	10	71.79	1	153.17
5	Egor Rukhin	223.96	1	86.09	7	137.87
6	Andrei Anisimov	214.77	4	82.63	12	132.14
7	Kirill Sarnovskiy	213.93	5	81.20	11	132.73
8	Maxim Belyavsky	212.51	18	63.25	2	149.26
9	Vladislav Dikidzhi	210.29	11	70.67	6	139.62
10	Daniil Fedosimov	210.04	7	73.87	8	136.17
11	Kirill Andrusik	205.43	8	72.43	10	133.00
12	Makar Puzin	198.80	16	65.41	9	133.39
13	Eduard Karartynian	196.37	17	64.35	13	132.02
14	Dmitry Shelkovnikov	188.53	15	65.71	14	122.82
15	Timofei Platonov	186.47	14	66.04	15	120.43
16	Grigory Fedorov	186.43	13	67.16	16	119.27
17	Ivan Popov	185.07	12	70.01	17	115.06
18	Fedor Zonov	171.76	9	71.99	18	99.77

==== Women ====
Rank	Name	Total points	SP		FS	
1	Sofia Akateva	237.09	1	78.84	1	158.25
2	Sofia Samodelkina	213.73	2	75.51	4	138.22
3	Sofia Muravieva	211.62	6	68.38	2	143.24
4	Alisa Dvoeglazova	206.83	8	67.58	3	139.25
5	Adeliia Petrosian	202.25	3	71.97	5	130.28
6	Elizaveta Kulikova	193.33	10	66.39	6	126.94
7	Alina Gorbacheva	191.97	5	68.72	9	123.25
8	Sofya Titova	190.31	9	66.81	8	123.50
9	Victoria Morozova	189.10	12	64.46	7	124.64
10	Nadezhda Ponteleenko	185.74	14	63.57	10	122.17
11	Ulyana Shiryaeva	182.39	13	63.58	11	118.81
12	Veronika Zhilina	180.98	4	69.91	16	111.07
13	Lyubov Rubtsova	179.27	11	65.10	12	114.17
14	Mariia Zakharova	179.20	7	68.10	15	111.10
15	Inga Gurgenidze	173.43	15	61.63	14	111.80
16	Natalia Lagutova	166.38	16	58.67	17	107.71
17	Sofia Zakharova	163.50	18	51.68	13	111.82
18	Anastasia Zinina	158.91	17	57.32	18	101.59

==== Pairs ====
Rank	Name	Total points	SP		FS	
1	Natalia Khabibullina / Ilya Knyazhuk	201.82	2	71.60	1	130.22
2	Iuliia Artemeva / Mikhail Nazarychev	200.53	1	74.30	2	126.23
3	Ekaterina Chikmareva / Matvei Ianchenkov	189.48	3	70.04	3	119.44
4	Anastasia Mukhortova / Dmitry Evgenyev	188.22	4	69.84	5	118.38
5	Ekaterina Geynish / Ilya Mironov	187.35	5	68.30	4	119.05
6	Polina Kostiukovich / Aleksei Briukhanov	184.04	6	67.81	6	116.23
7	Kseniia Akhanteva / Valerii Kolesov	179.31	7	67.80	7	111.51
8	Ekaterina Petushkova / Evgenii Malikov	174.36	8	65.72	9	108.64
9	Anna Kireeva / Ilya Ivanov	169.74	11	59.96	8	109.78
10	Varvara Cheremnykh / Daniil Butenko	167.97	10	62.04	10	105.93
11	Ekaterina Storublevtseva / Artem Gritsaenko	161.74	9	63.88	12	97.86
12	Maya Shegay / Igor Shamshurov	157.71	12	55.45	11	102.26

==== Ice dance ====
Rank	Name	Total points	RD		FD	
1	Irina Khavronina / Dario Cirisano	182.77	3	71.46	1	111.31
2	Vasilisa Kaganovskaia / Valeriy Angelopol	182.06	1	72.95	2	109.11
3	Sofya Tyutyunina / Alexander Shustitskiy	178.12	2	72.81	4	105.31
4	Sofia Leontieva / Daniil Gorelkin	172.88	4	67.10	3	105.78
5	Alisa Ovsiankina / Matvei Samokhin	162.12	5	65.26	6	96.86
6	Ekaterina Rybakova / Ivan Makhnonosov	160.56	9	62.62	5	97.94
7	Margarita Svistunova / Dmitrii Studenikin	160.01	6	64.22	8	95.79
8	Anna Shcherbakova / Egor Goncharov	158.90	8	62.71	7	96.19
9	Ekaterina Katashinskaya / Matvei Grachyov	158.28	7	63.94	9	94.34
10	Sofiia Kachushkina / Oleg Muratov	153.41	10	60.38	10	93.03
11	Sofia Aleksova / Ilya Vladimirov	152.11	12	59.75	11	92.36
12	Taisiia Linchevskaya / Timur Babaev-Smirnov	150.89	11	60.13	12	90.76
13	Anna Kolomenskaya / Artem Frolov	145.41	14	56.83	13	88.58
14	Elizaveta Maleina / Grigory Rodin	139.14	13	57.81	15	81.33
15	Polina Kocherygina / Evgeni Artyushchenko	136.81	15	52.29	14	84.52

== International team selections ==
=== Winter Universiade ===
The 2021 Winter Universiade, originally scheduled for 21–31 January 2021 in Lucerne, Switzerland, was postponed to 11–21 December 2021 but finally it was cancelled definitively on 29 November 2021.

=== European Championships ===
The 2022 European Championships were held in Tallinn, Estonia from 10 to 16 January 2022. Russia's team was published on 26 December 2021.

	Men	Women	Pairs	Ice dancing
1	Mark Kondratiuk	Kamila Valieva	Anastasia Mishina / Aleksandr Galliamov	Alexandra Stepanova / Ivan Bukin
2	~~Mikhail Kolyada~~ (withdrew)	Alexandra Trusova	Aleksandra Boikova / Dmitrii Kozlovskii	Diana Davis / Gleb Smolkin
3	Evgeni Semenenko	Anna Shcherbakova	Evgenia Tarasova / Vladimir Morozov	Victoria Sinitsina / Nikita Katsalapov
1st alt.	Andrei Mozalev (called up)	Elizaveta Tuktamysheva	Daria Pavliuchenko / Denis Khodykin	Elizaveta Khudaiberdieva / Egor Bazin
2nd alt.	Petr Gumennik	Maya Khromykh	Iuliia Artemeva / Mikhail Nazarychev	Annabelle Morozov / Andrei Bagin
3rd alt.	Alexander Samarin		Karina Akopova / Nikita Rakhmanin	Elizaveta Shanaeva / Devid Naryzhnyy

=== Winter Olympics ===
The 2022 Winter Olympics were held in Beijing, China from 4 to 20 February 2022. Russia's team was published on 20 January 2022.

	Men	Women	Pairs	Ice dancing
1	Mark Kondratiuk	Kamila Valieva	Anastasia Mishina / Aleksandr Galliamov	Victoria Sinitsina / Nikita Katsalapov
2	Andrei Mozalev	Anna Shcherbakova	Evgenia Tarasova / Vladimir Morozov	Alexandra Stepanova / Ivan Bukin
3	~~Mikhail Kolyada~~ (withdrew)	Alexandra Trusova	Aleksandra Boikova / Dmitrii Kozlovskii	Diana Davis / Gleb Smolkin
1st alt.	Evgeni Semenenko (called up)	Elizaveta Tuktamysheva	Daria Pavliuchenko / Denis Khodykin	Elizaveta Khudaiberdieva / Egor Bazin
2nd alt.	Petr Gumennik	Maya Khromykh	Iuliia Artemeva / Mikhail Nazarychev	Annabelle Morozov / Andrei Bagin
3rd alt.				Elizaveta Shanaeva / Devid Naryzhnyy

=== European Youth Olympic Winter Festival ===
The 2022 European Youth Olympic Winter Festival, originally scheduled for 6–13 February 2021 in Vuokatti, Finland, was postponed to 11–18 December 2021 and then to 20–25 March 2022. However, on 2 March 2022, in accordance with a recommendation by the International Olympic Committee (IOC), European Olympic Committees (EOC) suspended the participation of Russia from 2022 European Youth Olympic Winter Festival due to the 2022 Russian invasion of Ukraine.

=== World Championships ===
The 2022 World Championships were held in Montpellier, France from 21 to 27 March 2022. However, on 1 March 2022, in accordance with a recommendation by the International Olympic Committee (IOC), the International Skating Union (ISU) banned figure skaters and officials from Russia from attending all international competitions due to the 2022 Russian invasion of Ukraine.

=== World Junior Championships ===
Commonly referred to as "Junior Worlds", the 2022 World Junior Championships were originally scheduled for 7–13 March 2022 in Sofia, Bulgaria before postponing to 13–17 April 2022 in Tallinn, Estonia. However, on 1 March 2022, in accordance with a recommendation by the International Olympic Committee (IOC), the International Skating Union (ISU) banned figure skaters and officials from Russia from attending all international competitions due to the 2022 Russian invasion of Ukraine.
