= Irina Khavronina =

Russian ice dancer (born 2004)

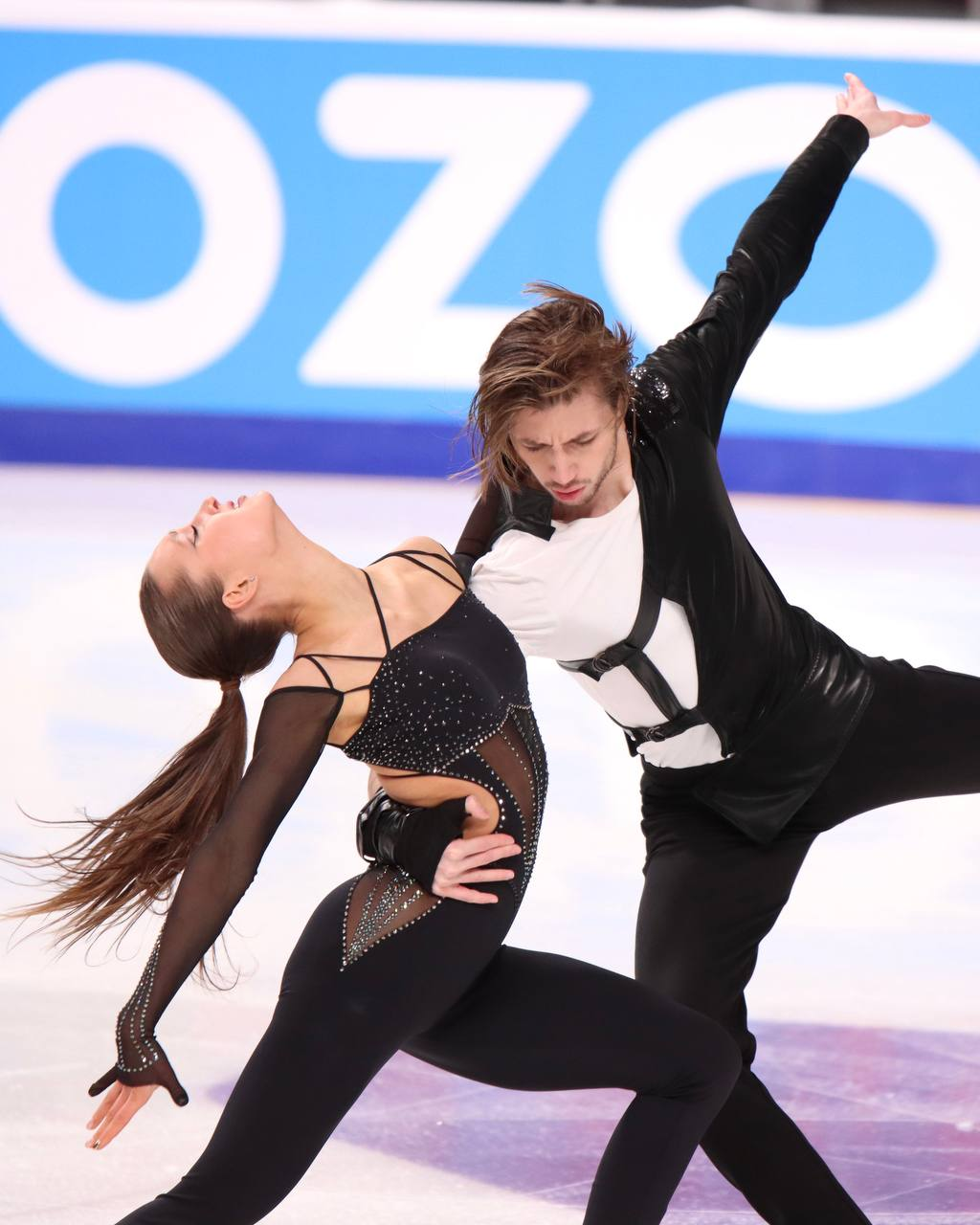
- Khavronina/Naryzhnyy at the 2024 Russian Figure Skating Championships

Personal information
- Native name: Ирина Дмитриевна Хавронина
- Full name: Irina Dmitrievna Khavronina
- Born: 31 July 2004 (age 22) Moscow, Russia
- Home town: Odintsovo, Russia
- Height: 1.68 m (5 ft 6 in)

Figure skating career
- Country: (Individual Neutral Athletes) Individual Neutral Athlete; Russia
- Partner: Devid Naryzhnyy
- Coach: Alexander Zhulin
- Began skating: 2009
Medal record
Representing Russia
Figure skating: Ice dance
Winter Youth Olympics
Gold medal – first place	2020 Lausanne	Ice dance
Russian Championships
Bronze medal – third place	2025 Omsk	Ice dancing
Bronze medal – third place	2024 Chelyabinsk	Ice dancing

Irina Dmitrievna Khavronina (Russian: Ирина Дмитриевна Хавронина; born 31 July 2004) is a Russian ice dancer. With her former skating partner, Dario Cirisano, she is the 2020 Winter Youth Olympic champion and the 2022 Russian junior champion. With her skating partner Devid Naryzhnyy she is a two-time Russian Nationals bronze medalist.

== Personal life ==
Khavronina was born on 31 July 2004 in Moscow, Russia.

== Career ==
=== Early years ===
Khavronina began learning how to skate as a five-year-old in 2009. She began competing in ice dance during the 2012–13 season, skating in domestic Russian events with her first partner, Ivan Desyatov. The two skated together at the novice level for two seasons. In 2014, she teamed up with Nikita Tashirev. They competed together for four seasons and won three international medals in advanced novice events before parting ways.

In 2018, Khavronina teamed up with Dario Cirisano. The two finished 11th at the 2019 Russian Junior Figure Skating Championships.

=== 2019–20 season ===
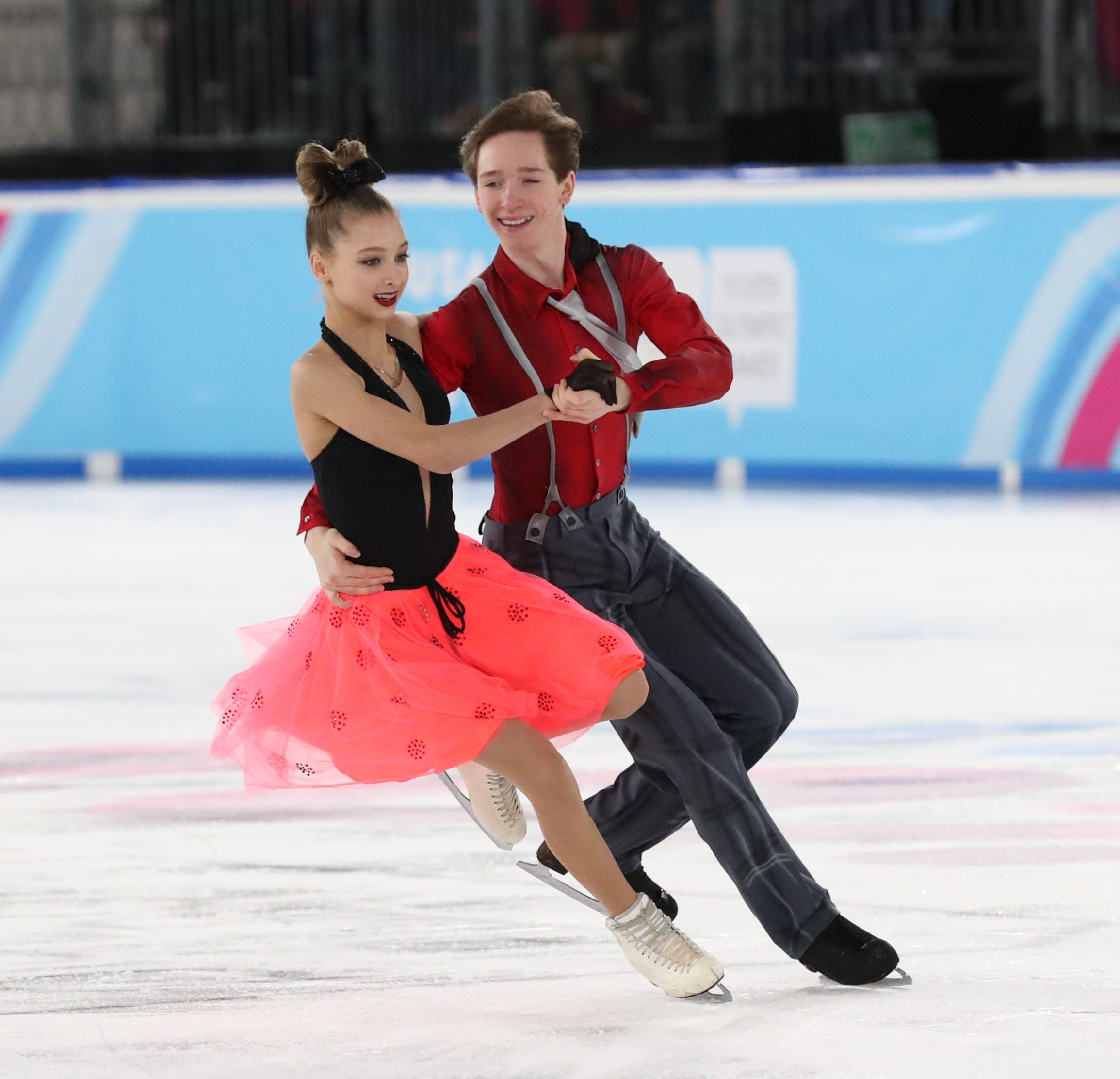
Khavronina/Cirisano performing their rhythm dance at the 2020 Winter Youth Olympics

Apart from competing nationally, Khavronina/Cirisano also won the 2019 Santa Claus Cup in junior ice dance.

In January 2020 they participated in the 2020 Winter Youth Olympics in Lausanne, Switzerland. They ranked first in both segments and outscored fellow Russians Sofya Tyutyunina / Alexander Shustitskiy by 5.48 points to take the gold medal.

=== 2020–21 season ===
Due to the COVID-19 pandemic, the international junior season was cancelled, and Khavronina/Cirisano competed exclusively domestically. They won the bronze medal at the 2021 Russian Junior Championships.

=== 2021–22 season ===
With the resumption of international junior competition, Khavronina/Cirisano received their first ISU Junior Grand Prix assignment to the 2021 JGP Russia in September. The team scored a new personal best to win the rhythm dance and ultimately took the gold medal overall, despite falling slightly behind compatriots Sofia Leonteva / Daniil Gorelkin in the free dance.

At their next assignment, 2021 JGP Poland, Khavronina/Cirisano again upgraded their personal best in the rhythm dance, scoring 68.05 points to win the segment. They ranked first in the free dance as well and took the gold medal.

At the 2022 Russian Junior Championships they scored their season's best in both segments and won the tournament despite ranking third in the rhythm dance behind Vasilisa Kaganovskaya/Valery Angelopol and Sofya Tyutyunina/Alexander Shustitsky.

=== 2022–23 season ===
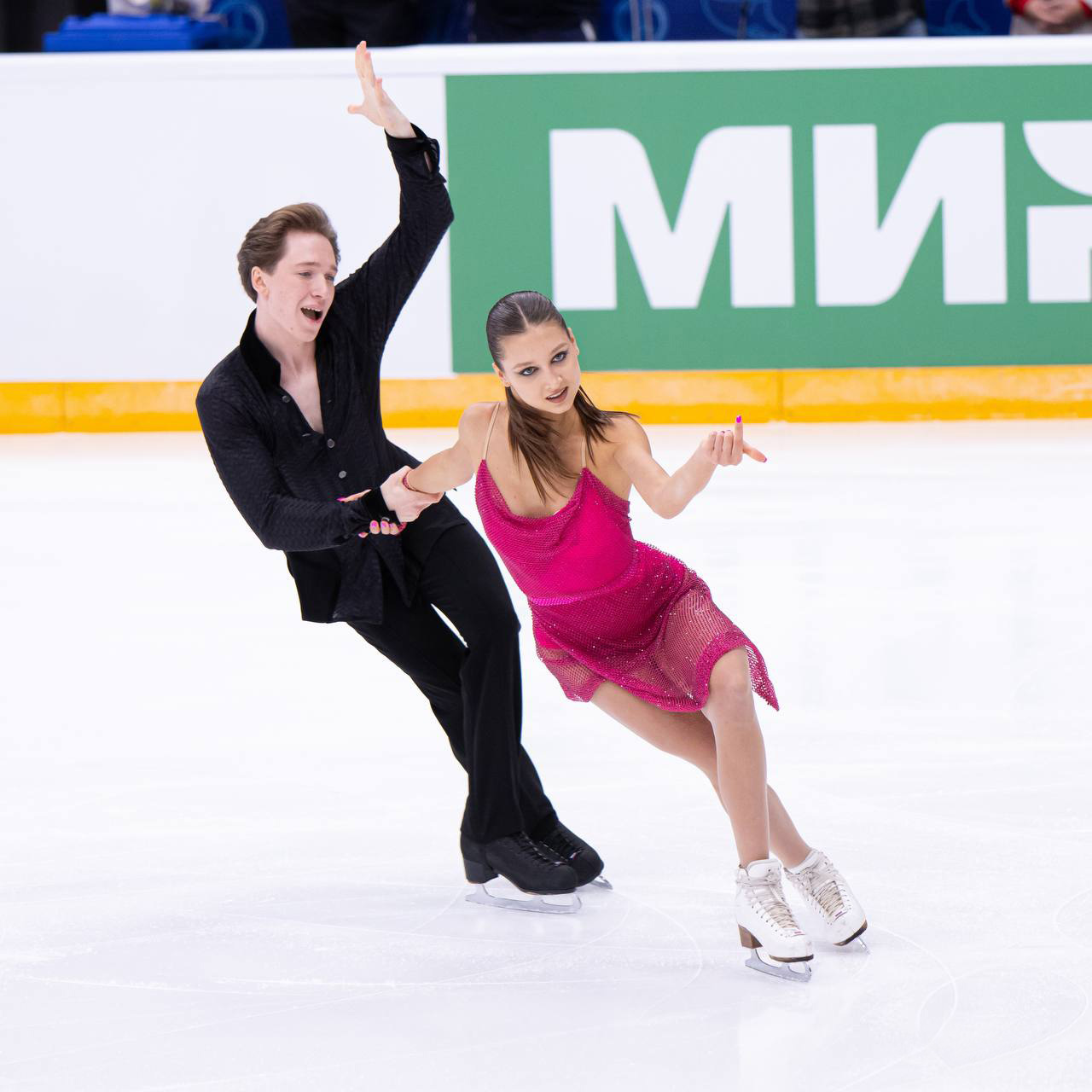
Khavronina/Cirisano performing their rhythm dance at the 2022 Russian Test Skates

Khavronina/Cirisano debuted at the senior level competing domestically. At their first tournament of the season, the Grand Prix of Russia event in Sochi, they scored their personal bests in both segments ranking second in the rhythm dance, the free dance and overall. They went on to win the bronze medal at their next Grand Prix of Russia competition in Moscow.

They participated in the 2023 Russian Figure Skating Championships later that year and ranked 5th after the rhythm dance. They had to withdraw from the free dance, however, as Khavronina hadn't fully recovered from getting the flu before the tournament.

The duo split up soon after the 2023 Russian Nationals with Khavronina later stating they had different views on their future as an ice dance couple. Khavronina then teamed up with Devid Naryzhnyy.

=== 2023–24 season ===
On January 17, 2023, Khavronina/Naryzhnyy took to the ice for their first training session led by their new coaches Denis Samokhin and Maria Borovikova. Samokhin commented: "They look good [together], they are two very capable, technically sound athletes, they are well suited to each other." The couple hoped to perform at the Russian Challenge show program tournament on March 18 and prepared a gala number but they were not selected as participants. Coach Maria Borovikova stated that Khavronina/Naryzhnyy didn't even get to perform their gala program at the casting as there was no casting before the tournament. She also complemented the couple on their progress adding: "They have a good sense of what they are doing. Their stylish performance adds chiс to the program".

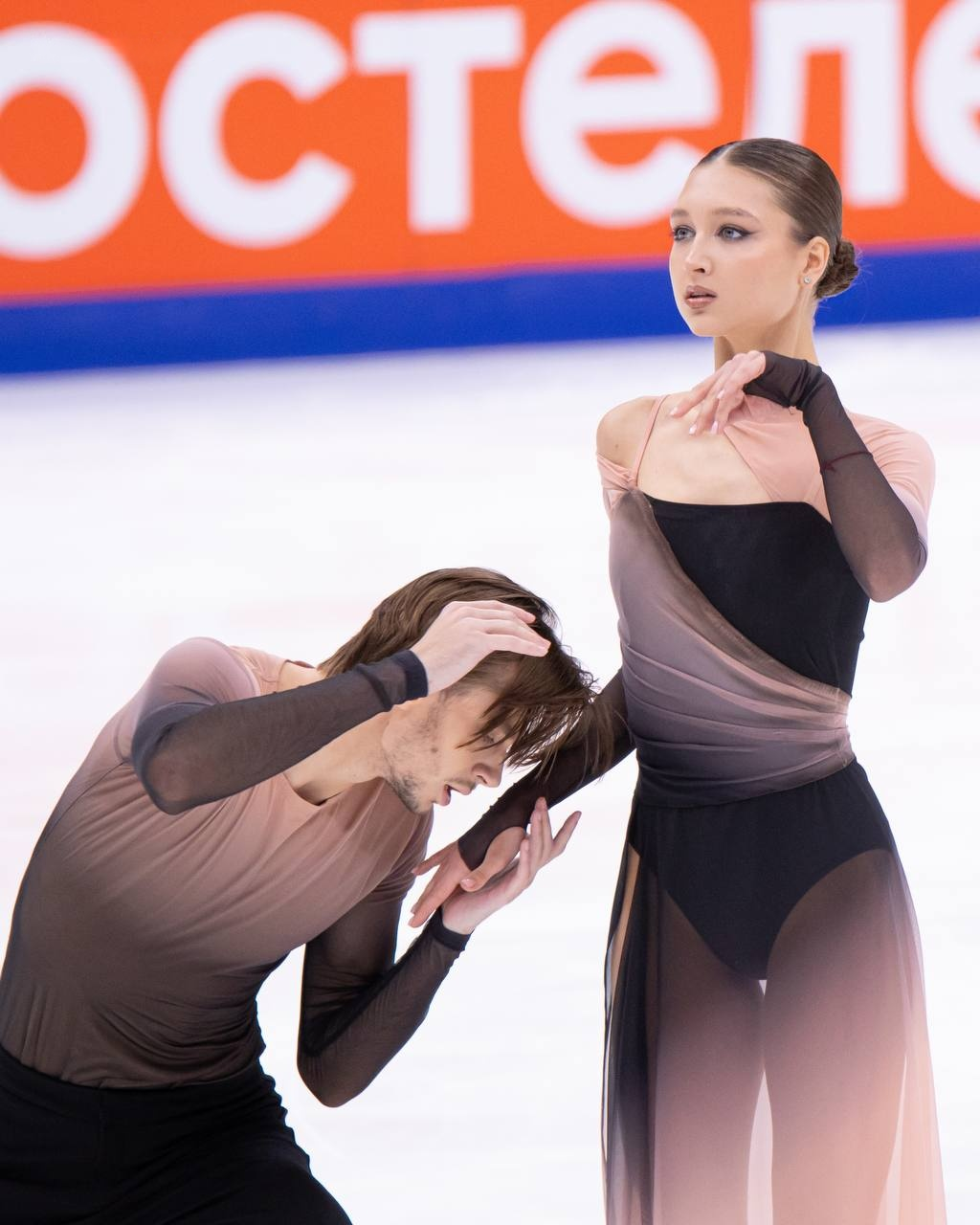
Khavronina/Naryzhnyy performing their free dance at the 2023 Russian Test Skates

Khavronina/Naryzhnyy's first performance as a new couple took place on May 4 in Ilia Averbukh's show in Moscow. They skated to "Oh, the Roads…" and performed in several group numbers. They also performed on May 7 in the same show in Saint-Petersburg. Naryzhnyy later described his emotions during their first performance as "being calm" and Khavronina stated she had been looking forward to it: "I really wanted to capture it in my memory, every second, because I felt that moment deeply. When we left the ice after our performance, we hugged. It was touching, atmospheric. To me, it was unforgettable."

The couple presented their competitive programs at the Russian Test Skates in September 2023. They skated to Michael Jackson’s songs in the rhythm dance and to a medley of Power-Haus tracks in their free dance. On finishing their free program, Khavronina became emotional and later said the preparation for the test skates was difficult for her: “I was very nervous during the test skates. I really wanted us to show our best both to the judges and the audience. I was worried about how they would accept us, there was pressure”.

When commenting on their choice of music, Naryzhnyy said he had long wanted to skate to Michael Jackson’s songs and suggested this option to their team. The couple added their free dance was about love, relationships and difficulties that they were overcoming together.

Khavronina/Naryzhnyy started their competitive season by winning gold at the 2023 Nikolai Panin-Kolomenkin Memorial. They earned a solid score of 80.76 for their rhythm dance and 115.84 for their free dance with a one-point deduction for their choreographic sliding movement.

They improved their free dance and total scores at their next competition, “Quray” of the Russian Grand Prix series. They won silver behind Elizaveta Khudaiberdieva/Egor Bazin who placed first. At the ‘Volga Pirouette’ Grand Prix tournament Khavronina/Naryzhnyy won another silver medal scoring their season’s best in the free dance.

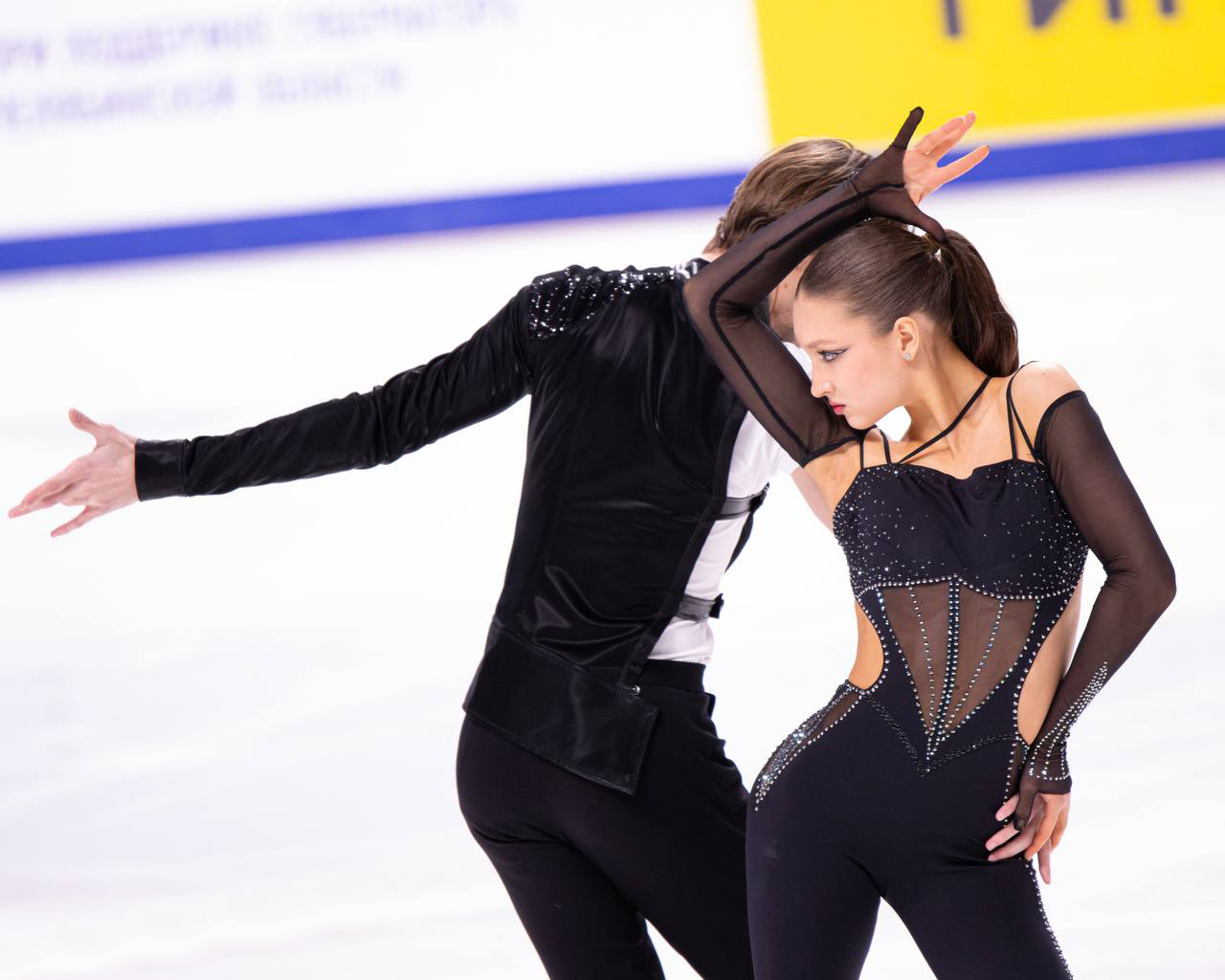
Khavronina/Naryzhnyy performing in the rhythm dance at the 2024 Russian Nationals

At the 2024 Russian Figure Skating Championships Khavronina/Naryzhnyy placed 5th in the rhythm dance due to a mistake on synchronized twizzles. They, however, scored their season’s best in the free dance placing second in the segment and winning the bronze medal at their first Russian Nationals.

After the championship Khavronina stated that this time she prepared for the tournament calmly and wasn't nervous at all. Naryzhnyy, on the other hand, said preparing for the Nationals was hard as he was anxious to show everything they could do in training.

The couple's next tournament was the 2024 All-Russia Spartakiad in February where they earned their best scores of the season in both segments and won the bronze medal behind Khudaiberdieva/Bazin (silver) and Stepanova/Bukin (gold).

In March, they participated in the Channel One Trophy. They were on the White Team led by Olympic champion Alina Zagitova who acted as the team’s captain.

=== 2024–2025 season ===
Khavronina/Naryzhnyy presented their new programs, albeit fragments, in August 2024 at an open training session led by their coaching team. They chose funk as the main rhythm for their rhythm dance to 'Get Up, I Feel Like Being A Sex Machine' by James Brown and 'Do You Love Me' by The Contours. The couple commented their program wasn't based on 'Dirty Dancing' or any other movie. “We just liked the music. First, we found the first piece, we really liked its rhythm, its mood. So, we’re just two people dancing at a disco”, said Khavronina.

The couple’s coaches suggested ‘Following A Bird’ by Ezio Bosso and ‘Run’ by Ludovico Einaudi for their free dance. Coach Denis Samokhin’s mother, Natalia Dubinskaya, had died earlier that year after struggling with motor neurone disease, a condition that Italian composer Ezio Bosso was diagnosed with in his early 40s. Khavronina and Naryzhnyy described their free dance as ‘life as it goes, a person’s struggle’. “This is something new for us”, stated Khavronina adding: “There is no love story or romantic feelings. It’s breathing, the desire to live”.

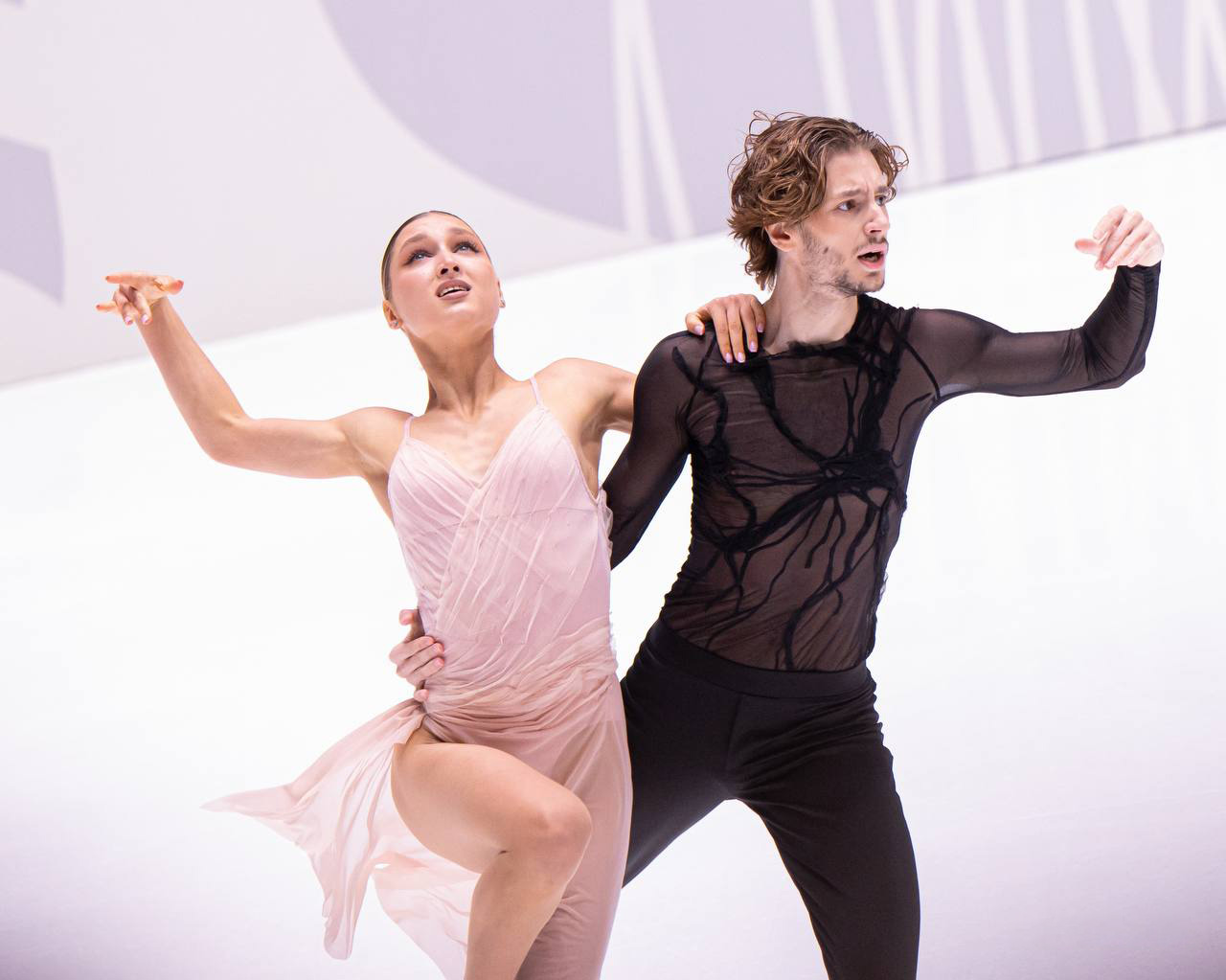
Khavronina/Naryzhnyy performing in the free dance at the 2024 Test Skates

After presenting their programs in full at the 2024 Russian Test skates, Khavronina/Naryzhnyy planned to start their season at the Nikolai Panin-Kolomenkin Memorial but had to withdraw due to minor health issues. Their first competition was a Russian Grand Prix event ‘Stars of Magnitka’ where they finished 2nd behind Stepanova/Bukin. Khavronina/Naryzhnyy’s free dance score was only 0.98 points lower than that of Stepanova/Bukin with the total score difference between the two couples being 2,94.

At their next tournament, 'The Golden Skate' of the Russian Grand Prix in Moscow, Khavronina/Naryzhnyy won silver while Stepanova/Bukin again placed first. This time Stepanova/Bukin’s total score was 7,8 points higher, but Khavronina/Naryzhnyy received better levels resulting in a higher base value score in both rhythm and free dance. They were also the only ice dance couple to be awarded a level 4 for their Pattern Dance Type Step Sequence in the rhythm dance.

After the tournament coach Denis Samokhin stated that Naryzhnyy had been skating with a knee injury and had had to undergo some treatment before the event. The team were looking forward to the Russian Nationals and planned to work on performance skills and speed in their programs.

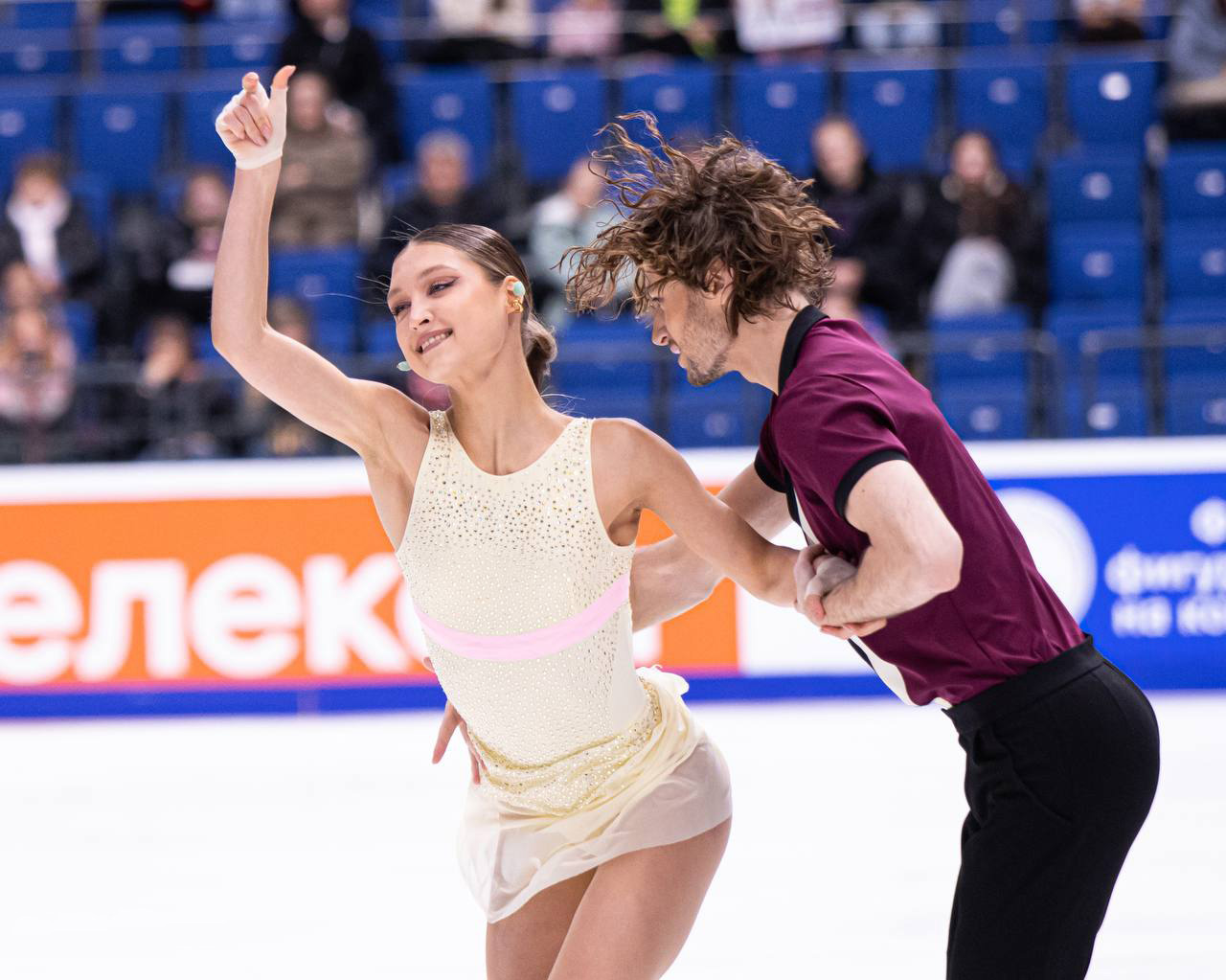
Khavronina/Naryzhnyy performing in the rhythm dance at the 2024 Golden Skate

At the 2025 Russian Figure Skating Championships Khavronina/Naryzhnyy improved their season’s best in both segments, placing 2nd in the rhythm dance, 3rd in the free dance and winning the bronze medal. Their total score was only 0.45 points lower than that of Khudaiberdieva/Bazin who won silver. Khavronina/Naryzhnyy yet again received the highest base value score in both programs (with Stepanova/Bukin receiving an equal score in the free dance).

The couple had to withdraw from the gala, however, as Naryzhnyy had aggravated his injury. Soon after the Nationals coach Denis Samokhin announced that Naryzhnyy needed further treatment and the couple might finish their season early.

In January 2025 Naryzhnyy underwent knee surgery. “He had a damaged meniscus and a certain part of the cartilage”, Denis Samokhin explained. “It's not a big problem, but the damaged edge of the meniscus could affect the cartilage further - and that would be serious. During the surgery, they removed the damaged piece of the meniscus and cleaned the cartilage”. According to Samokhin, Naryzhnyy is recovering well and is expected to resume on-ice training in April 2025.

In June 2025 Khavronina/Naryzhnyy started training under Alexander Zhulin.

=== 2025–2026 season ===
In December 2025, Khavronina's partner, Naryzhnyy, underwent a second knee surgery. “The first procedure was a mosaic chondroplasty of the lateral femoral condyle. This time, it was just a chondroplasty of the patellar cartilage. They also cleaned up all the scar tissue from the previous operation performed on January 16”, Naryzhnyy stated. The pair did not compete during the 2025–26 season.

In April 2026, he began light on-ice training after his second surgery.

On 30 June 2026, the International Skating Union announced that figure skaters from Russia and Belarus would be allowed to compete at international competitions as Individual Neutral Athletes (AINs). Each of these skaters are required to undergo an individual assessment conducted by the ISU Council to determine whether they meet the criteria for neutral status. The team's application was approved, making them eligible to compete internationally as neutral athletes.

=== 2026–27 season ===
Khavronina and Naryzhnyy opened the season by performing at the national team’s Test Skates. Olympic silver medalist in ice dance at the 2022 Winter Olympics Nikita Katsalapov also began working with the duo as a coach.

== Programs ==
=== With Naryzhnyy ===
Season	Rhythm dance	Free dance	Exhibition
2026–2027	Maison - by Emilio Piano & Lucie; To Build a Home - by The Cinematic Orchestra	Obscurity; Sonder - by Lex Rukinov	
2025–2026			
2024–2025	Get Up, I Feel Like Being A Sex Machine by James Brown; Do You Love Me by The Contours	Following A Bird by Ezio Bosso; Run by Ludovico Einaudi	
2023–2024	The Way You Make Me Feel; Man In The Mirror; Beat It by Michael Jackson	Obscura; Iduna; Arena by Power-Haus ft. Christian Reindl & Lucie Paradis	It's a Man's Man's Man's World by Seal

=== With Cirisano ===
Season	Rhythm dance	Free dance	Exhibition
2022-2023	Dite ca vous dirait avec moi by Claude Confortès; La La La by Shakira and Carlinhos Brown	Cold Song by Klaus Nomi; Winter (from The Four Seasons) by Antonio Vivaldi	
2021–2022	OTR by Moka Efti Orchestra; Praezision (from Babylon Berlin) by Johnny Klimek and Tom Tykwer	La cumparsita performed by Klazz Brothers and Cuba Percussion; Movimiento continuo by Soledad; Por una cabeza performed by Anna Dereszowska and Machina Del Tango; Adrenalina by Electrocutango	
2020–2021	Foxtrot: Give Me This Night by Andrey Birin, Valery Syutkin; Swing: Boogie Woogie (from Stilyagi) choreo. by Natalia Yanovskaya	Toccata and Fugue in D minor, BWV 565 by Johann Sebastian Bach performed by Canadian Brass; Toccata - En Ré Mineur performed by Pierre-Yves Plat	
2019–2020	Foxtrot: Give Me This Night by Andrey Birin, Valery Syutkin; Swing: Boogie Woogie (from Stilyagi) choreo. by Natalia Yanovskaya	La Strada Suite by Marzio Conti, Nino Rota	
2018–2019	Assassin's Tango (from Mr. & Mrs. Smith) by John Powell	Xotica	

== Competitive highlights ==
=== Skating as an Individual Neutral Athlete ===
Competition placements at senior level
Season	2026–27
CS Denis Ten Memorial	4th
CS Nepela Memorial	7th

=== With Devid Naryzhnyy ===
National
Event	23–24	24–25
Russian Champ.	3rd	3rd
Russian Cup Final	3rd	
GPR Quray	2nd	
GPR Volga Pirouette	2nd	
GPR Stars of Magnitka		2nd
GPR Golden Skate		2nd
Panin-Kolomenkin Memorial	1st	
TBD = Assigned; WD = Withdrew

=== With Dario Cirisano ===
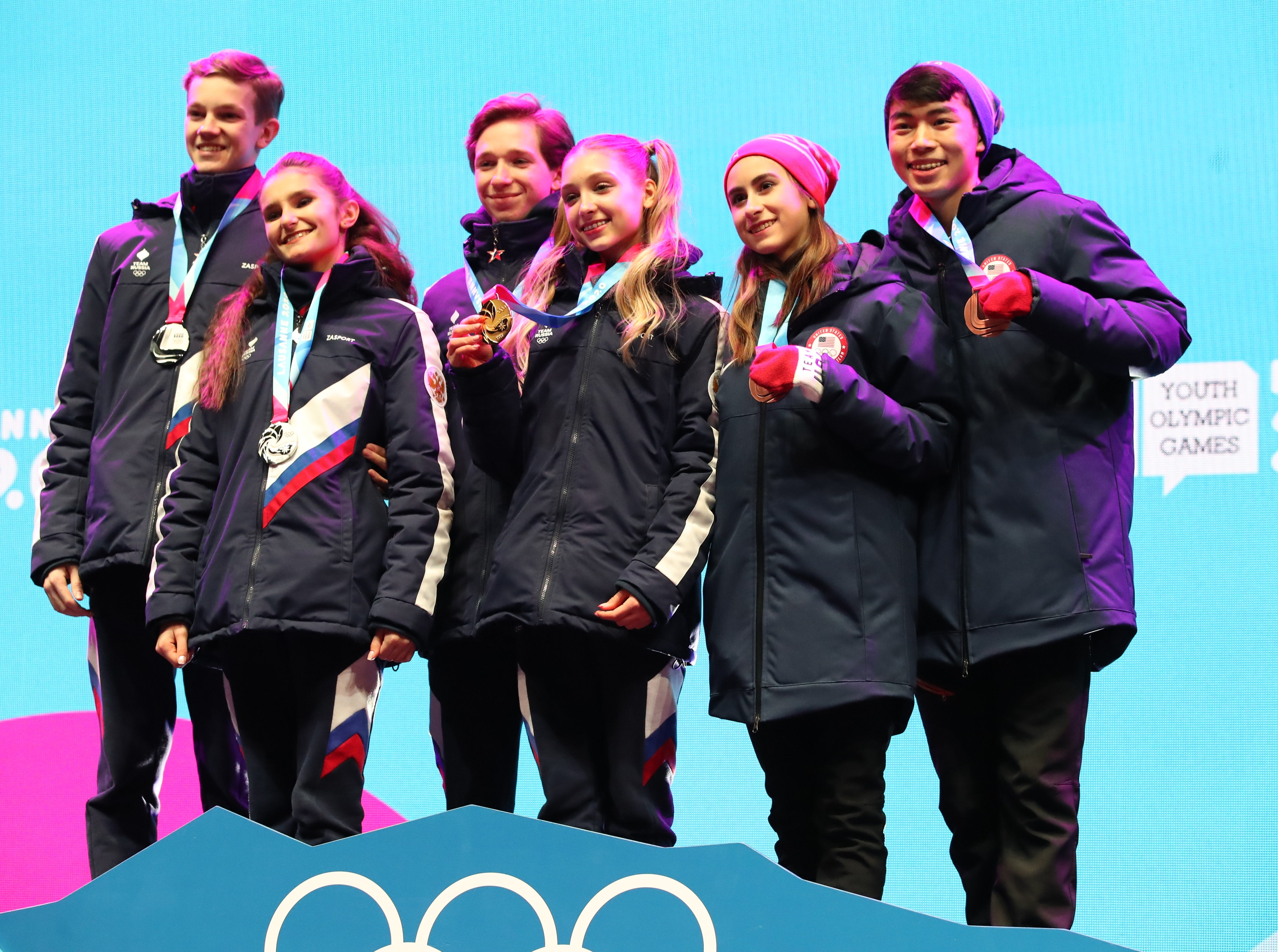
Khavronina / Cirisano (center) on the podium at the 2020 Winter Youth Olympics

International: Junior
Event	18–19	19–20	20–21	21–22	22–23
Youth Olympics		1st			
JGP Poland				1st	
JGP Russia				1st	
Halloween Cup	2nd				
Ice Mall Cup	2nd				
NRW Trophy	3rd				
Santa Claus Cup		1st			
National
Russian Champ.					WD
Russian Jr. Champ.	11th	WD	3rd	1st	
Russian Cup Final	1st J				
GPR Sochi					2nd
GPR Moscow					3rd

== Detailed results ==
=== Ice dance with Naryzhnyy ===
Results in the 2026–27 season
Date	Event	SP		FS		Total	
Date	Event	P	Score	P	Score	P	Score
Sep 24–27, 2026	(Slovakia) 2026 CS Nepela Memorial	7	73.78	7	104.55	7	177.93

=== Ice dance with Dario Cirisano ===
==== Junior level ====
2021–2022 season
Date	Event	RD	FD	Total
18–22 January 2022	2022 Russian Junior Championships	3; 71.46		
29 September – 2 October 2021	2021 JGP Poland	1; 68.05	1; 100.91	1; 168.96
15–18 September 2021	2021 JGP Russia	1; 66.52	2; 100.79	1; 167.31
2020–2021 season
1–5 February 2021	2021 Russian Junior Championships	2; 74.08	3; 107.52	3; 181.60
2019–2020 season
10–15 January 2020	2020 Winter Youth Olympics	1; 63.52	1; 101.11	1; 164.63
2–8 December 2019	2019 Santa Claus Cup	2; 64.38	1; 95.80	1; 160.18
