= Sofia Samodelkina =

Russian-Kazakh figure skater (born 2007)

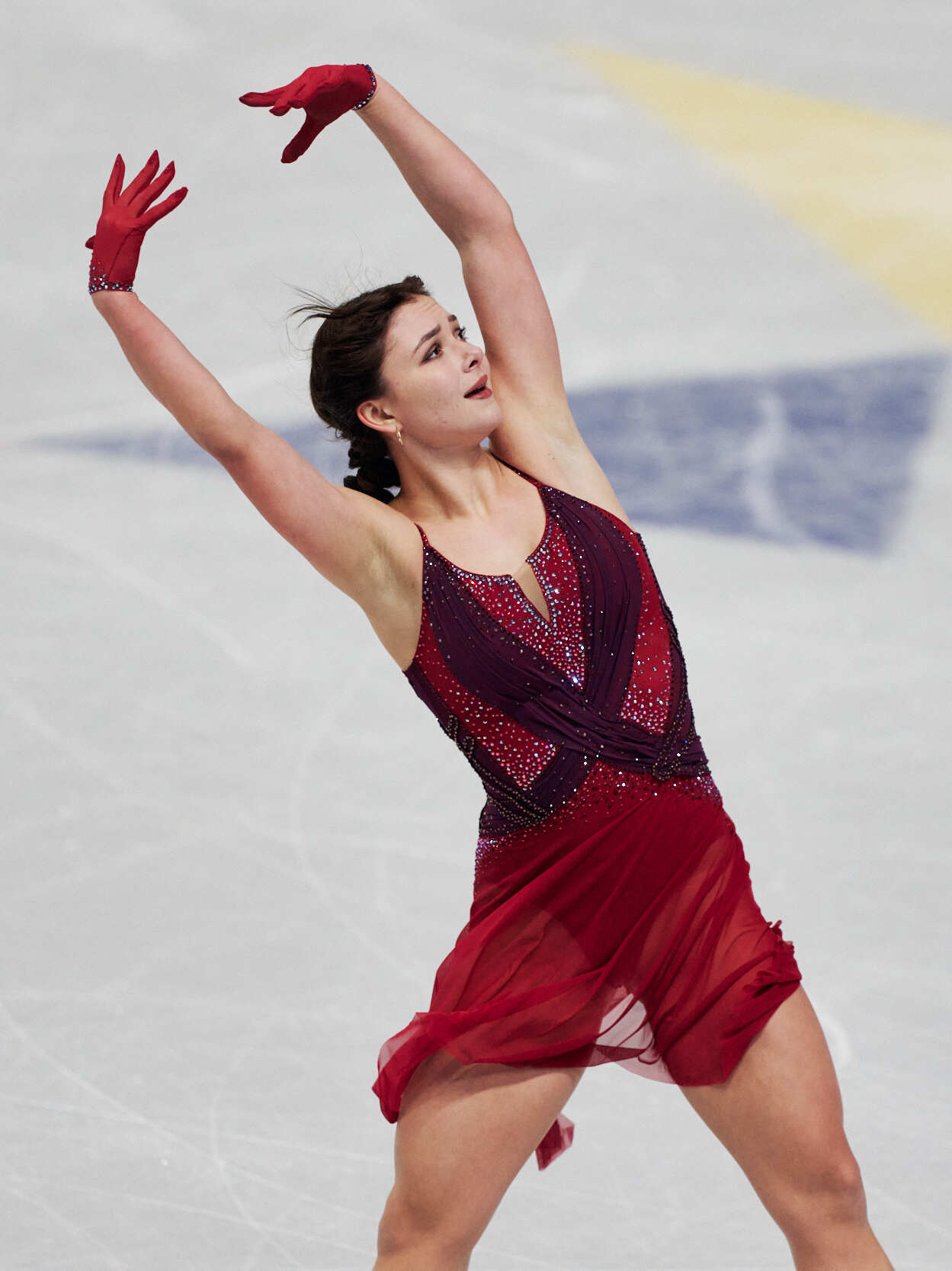
- Samodelkina performing her free skate at the 2026 World Championships

Personal information
- Native name: Софья Владимировна Самоделкина
- Full name: Sofia Vladimirovna Samodelkina
- Other names: Sofya; Sofa
- Born: 18 February 2007 (age 19) Moscow, Russia
- Home town: Astana, Kazakhstan
- Height: 1.71 m (5 ft 7 in)

Figure skating career
- Country: Kazakhstan (since 2024); Russia (2019–23)
- Discipline: Women's singles
- Coach: Rafael Arutyunyan
- Skating club: Kazakhstan Figure Skating Union
- Began skating: 2011

Medal record
Representing Kazakhstan
Kazakh Championships
Gold medal – first place	2025 Karaganda	Singles

Sofia Vladimirovna Samodelkina (Russian: Софья Владимировна Самоделкина; born 18 February 2007) is a Russian born Kazakhstani figure skater who currently competes for Kazakhstan. She is the 2025 Kazakhstan national champion, the 2025 NHK Trophy silver medalist, a five-time ISU Challenger Series medalist, and the 2025 World University Games bronze medalist. She represented Kazakhstan at the 2026 Winter Olympic Games.

As a junior skater, competing for Russia, she is the 2021 JGP Slovenia silver medalist, the 2021 JGP Russia bronze medalist, and the 2022 Russian Junior silver medalist.

Samodelkina is the ninth woman to land a quadruple jump and the fifteenth to land a triple Axel jump in international competition. She is the second woman after Alexandra Trusova who has landed all quadruple jumps except quad Axel in practice. She is the first woman to attempt a quad loop in competition, but the jump was not ratified due to under-rotation. She has landed ratified triple axels, quad salchows, and quad toes in international competition.

She is the first woman from Kazakhstan to win a senior Grand Prix medal.

== Personal life ==
Samodelkina was born on 18 February 2007, in Moscow to a Kazakh mother and a Russian father. She has an older brother and a younger sister, the latter of whom is a member of the national fencing team in Kazakhstan.

Samodelkina received Kazakhstani citizenship in the summer of 2023. In 2024, she enrolled into the Kazakh Academy of Sport and Tourism.

Following her top ten finish at the 2026 Winter Olympics, the National Olympic Committee of the Republic of Kazakhstan bought Samodelkina a one-bedroom apartment in Astana.

In addition to figure skating, she enjoys drawing as a hobby.

== Career ==
=== Early years ===
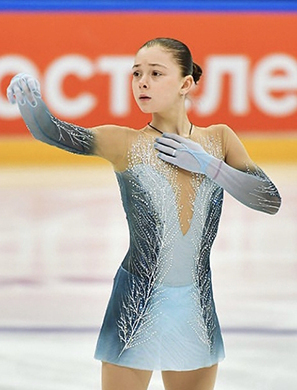
Samodelkina at the 2021 Russian Cup Final

In 2011, when Samodelkina was four years old, her parents decided to enroll her into figure skating at the CSKA Moscow. For the first six years of her skating career, Samodelkina was coached by Lilia Biktagirova. Sergei Davydov later became her coach in 2016.

Samodelkina placed fourth at the 2020 Russian Junior Championships and 2021 Russian Junior Championships.

=== Skating for Russia ===
==== 2021–22 season: International junior debut ====
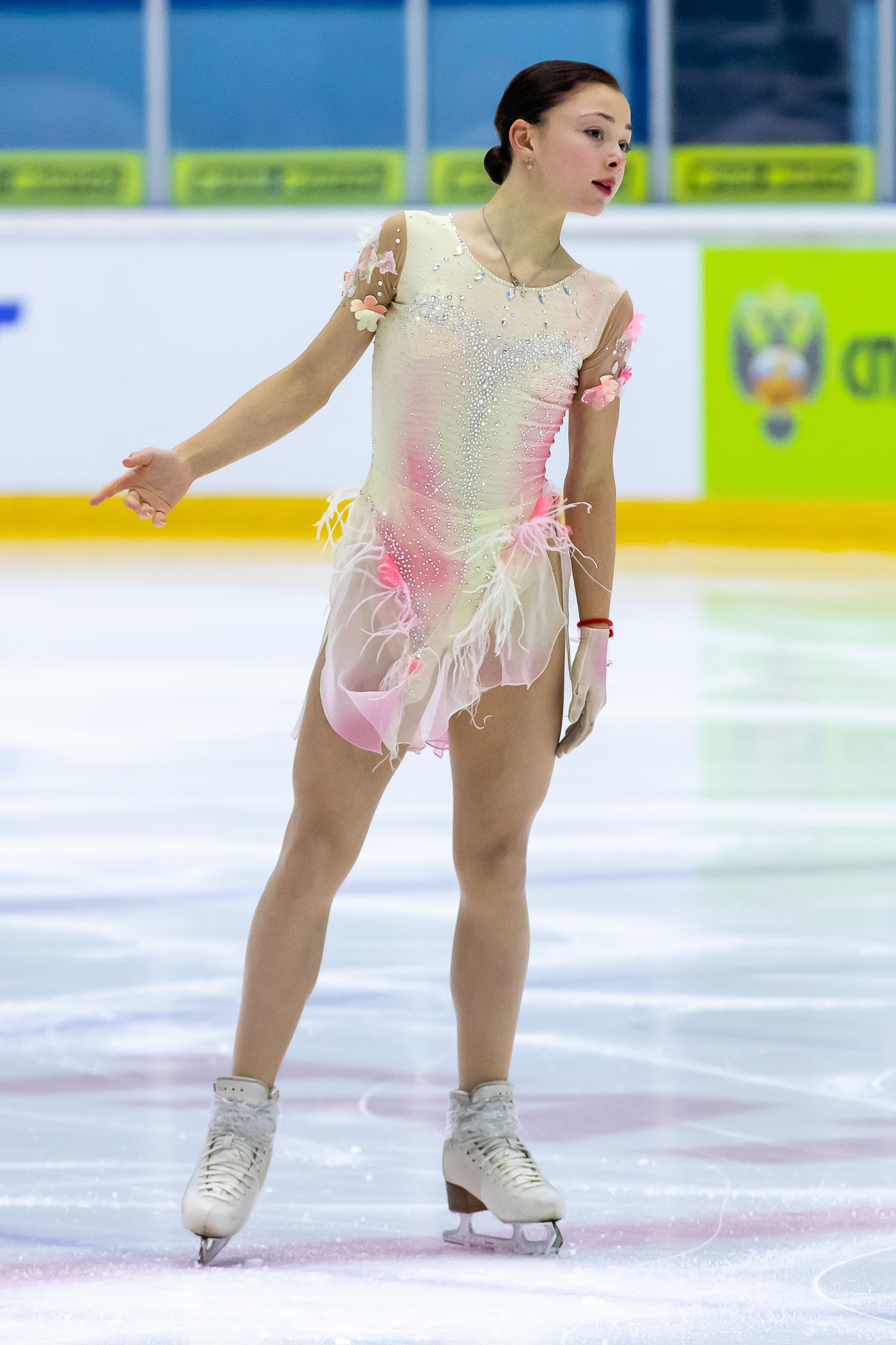
Samodelkina at the 2021 Russian Cup

Samodelkina made her junior international debut at the 2021 JGP Russia held in Krasnoyarsk in mid-September. She fell on an underrotated triple Axel jump in the short program, missing her combination as a result, ending up sixth in that segment. In the free skate, she placed second behind Sofia Akateva, landing a quadruple Salchow with positive GOE and becoming the ninth woman in history to land a quad. She also landed a quad Salchow-double toe loop combination and quad Lutz in the program, although called a quarter short, taking the bronze medal overall. At the 2021 JGP Slovenia, she made a mistake on the opening triple Axel and placed fourth. She won the free skate after landing a quad Salchow and rose to second place overall.

Later in autumn, at the 2021 Denis Ten Memorial Challenge, Samodelkina became the fifteenth woman to land a triple Axel jump in international competition and won the event.

Samodelkina made her debut at the senior national championships at the 2022 Russian Championships. She underrotated two of her three quad attempts, originally placing fifth, however, the original winner of the Championship Kamila Valieva was later stripped of her medal due to a positive doping test, promoting Samodelkina by one place meaning she finished fourth overall. She expressed enthusiasm at the overall results and qualifying for the national team for the following season.

At the 2022 Russian Junior Championships, Samodelkina performed her short program cleanly, including the triple Axel-triple toe loop combination, and placed second behind Sofia Akatieva. She stumbled on the quad Lutz and quad Salchow in the free skate but completed the other elements cleanly and won the silver medal behind Akatieva.

Due to the Russian invasion of Ukraine Samodelkina was not allowed to participate in the 2022 World Junior Figure Skating Championships as all athletes representing Russia were barred from international competition.

==== 2022–2023 season ====
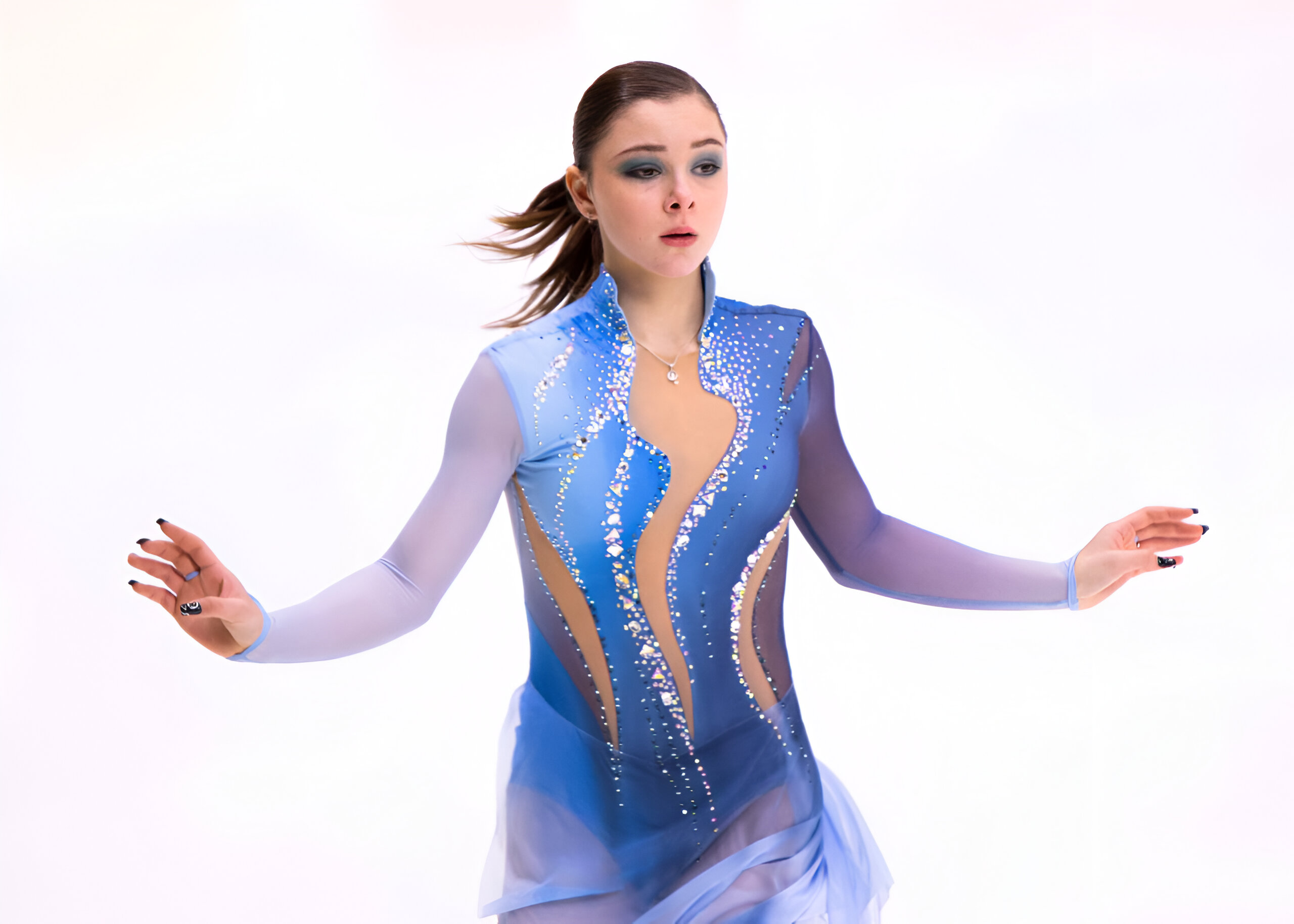
Samodelkina at the 2023 Channel One Trophy

Prior to the season, it was announced that Samodelkina had left her longtime coach Sergei Davydov and would instead be coached by Svetlana Sokolovskaya.

As Russia remained banned from international competition during the 2022–2023 season, Samodelkina opted to compete on the Russian Grand Prix series (a series of all-Russian competitions in the same format as the international Grand Prix series) Samodelkina was assigned to the second and fifth stages of the series.

At the second stage of the Russian Grand Prix series, Samodelkina scored 63.66 points in the short program and ranked in fifth place. She placed second in the free skate and second overall, winning the silver medal. At the fifth stage of the Russian Grand Prix, Samodelkina won both segments of the competition, winning the gold medal 4.07 points ahead of Olympic silver medalist Alexandra Trusova.

Competing at the 2023 Russian Championships, Samodelkina placed eighth in the short program and eleventh in the free skate, dropping to eleventh place overall. She went on to compete at the 2023 Channel One Trophy, where she was randomly drawn to compete on Kamila Valieva's team. She would individually place sixth at the event and her team would finish second overall. Samodelkina would then close her season by finishing eleventh at the 2023 Russian Grand Prix Final.

Throughout the season, Samodelkina underwent a significant growth spurt that would impact the timing of her jumps.

==== 2023–2024 season: Hiatus ====
Following a disappointing end to the 2023–24 season and conscious of the emerging talent of young female skaters in Russia, Samodelkina began considering skating for another country. Having previously received offers from the German Ice Skating Union and the Israel Ice Skating Federation to represent their respective countries, Samodelkina declined these offers and instead decided that she wanted to represent her mother's home country of Kazakhstan. This decision, however, was met with some pushback from the Russian Figure Skating Federation, which was initially reluctant to release her. In spite of this, Samodelkina obtained a Kazakhstan passport and moved to Astana, Kazakhstan in hopes of pursuing this goal.

In late September, it was announced that Samodelkina had made a coaching change from Svetlana Sokolovskaya to Evgeni Plushenko. Samodelkina would train in Astana whilst making frequent trips to Moscow to train at the Angels of Plushenko. While in Kazakhstan, she was coached by Elmira Turganova, who was also head of the National Skating Federation of the Republic of Kazakhstan. Samodelkina would later reveal that it had been Sokolovskaya's decision to end their working relationship shortly after she had decided to represent Kazakhstan.

She was officially released by the Russian Figure Skating Federation in May 2024. Russian figure skating coach and national figure skating team adviser, Tatiana Tarasova, reacted to this decision saying, "If the federation let her go, it means they don't consider it a big loss. For the Kazakhstan team, she may be [promising and talented], but for our team, she wasn't."

Samodelkina later spoke out on some of the negative attention she has received for deciding to represent Kazakhstan from both Russian media and the mental impact it had on her, "When I skated in Russia and was younger, the media didn't pay as much attention as they did after my change of citizenship. But, of course, I saw both good and bad. People write what they think. This is their opinion, their decision to write or not write... Of course, when you read something bad about yourself, no matter how much you say you don't pay attention to it, it's somewhat untrue; it still somehow stays in your mind. But I have my close and dear ones who always tell me the truth, whether it's bitter or sweet. I listen to them and try to improve."

=== Skating for Kazakhstan ===
==== 2024–25 season: First national title, Four Continents and World Championships debut ====
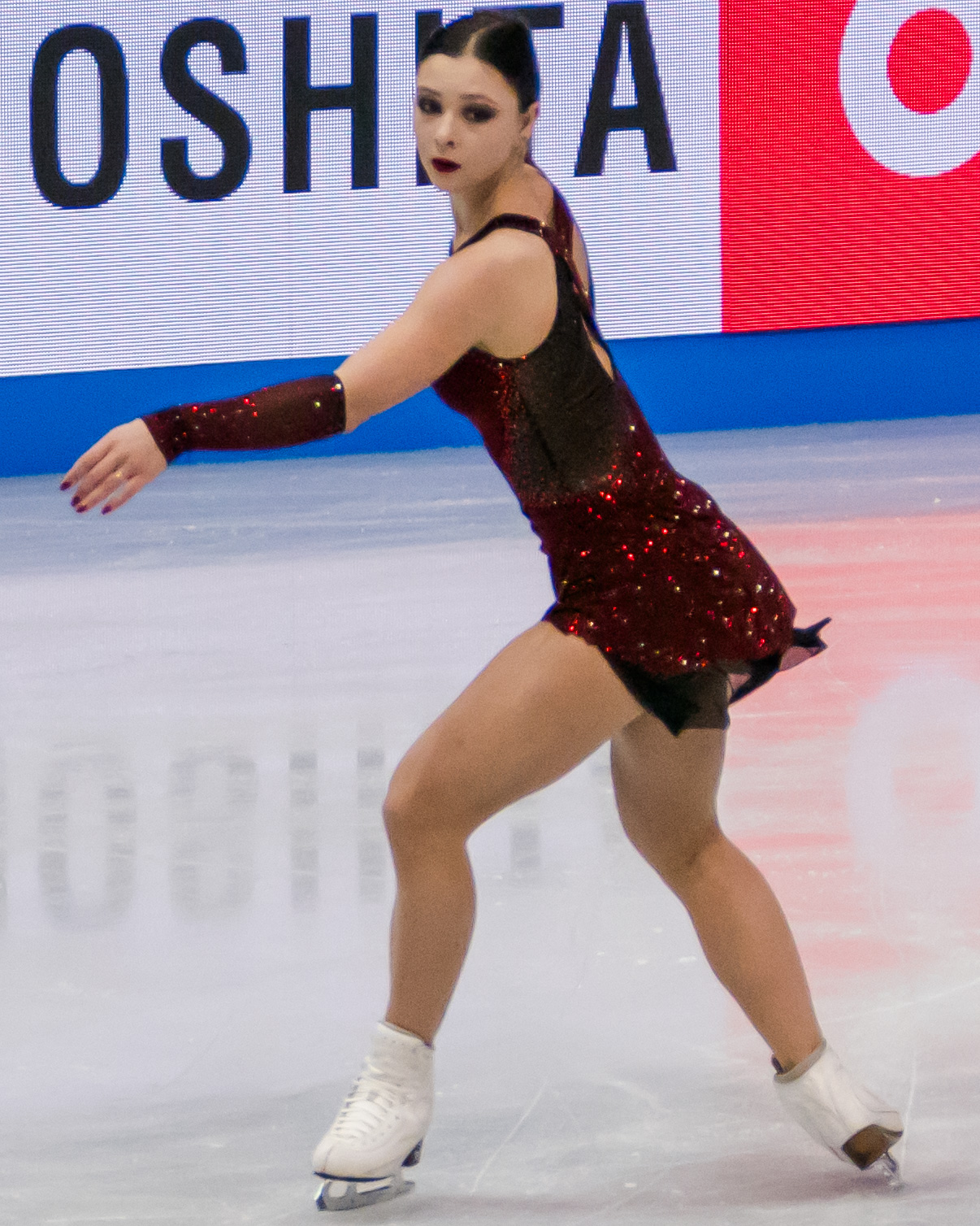
Samodelkina performing her short program at the 2025 World Championships

In July 2024, Samodelkina competed at the Kazakhstan Summer Championships, her first competition since March 2023. She ranked second place in the short program, but won the free skate, winning the gold medal overall. Upon watching Samodelkina's performances and her decreased level of technical difficulty, Tatiana Tarasova publicly mocked her, saying, "What Olympic medals? With such skating, they take the last places and don't give medals. No, it is impossible to see any future prospects in her."

At the beginning of September, Samodelkina announced that she had left Evgeni Plushenko and was now training in Kazakhstan full-time. Plushenko expressed his displeasure with Samodelkina's decision to leave the Angels of Plushenko, saying, "Everything was done very ugly. We will learn our lessons and try to act more wisely in the future, especially when working with foreign athletes." Later that month, Samodelkina competed on the Junior Grand Prix circuit for the first time in three years at the 2024 JGP Turkey, where she finished in fourth place. Going on to make her senior international debut at the 2024 Denis Ten Memorial Challenge, Samodelkina won the silver medal. Toward the end of October, Samodelkina traveled to Los Angeles, California, where she began a three-week internship with Rafael Arutyunyan. Continuing to compete on the 2024–25 ISU Challenger Series, Samodelkina won the silver medal at the 2024 Tallinn Trophy.

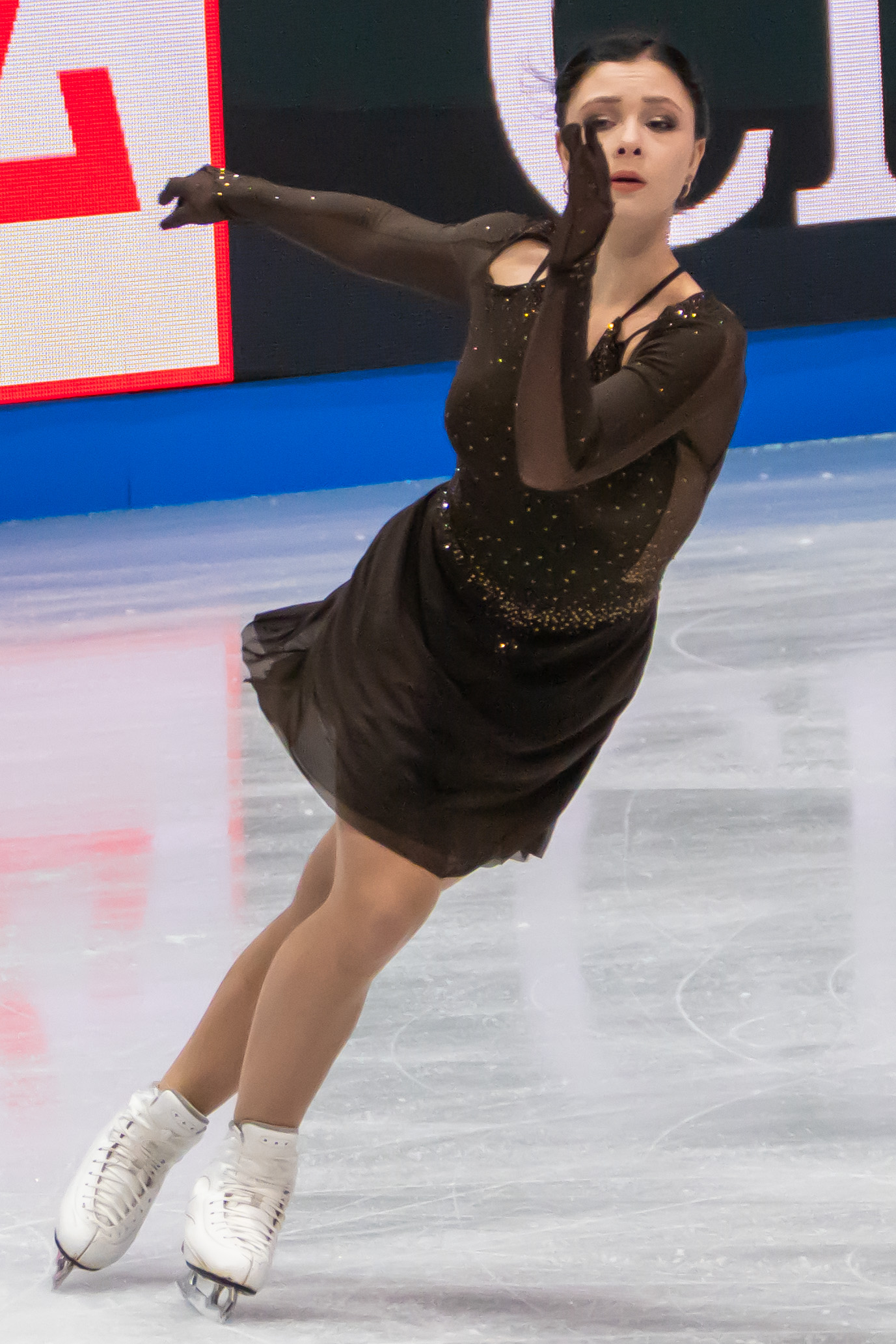
Sofia performing her free skate at the 2025 World Championships

In mid-December, Samodelkina won the gold medal at the 2025 Kazakh Championships. The following month, Samodelkina competed at the 2025 Winter World University Games in Turin, Italy, where she won the bronze medal behind Rion Sumiyoshi and Mone Chiba.

In late February, Samodelkina finished fourth at the 2025 Asian Winter Games in Harbin, China. One week later, she competed at the 2025 Four Continents Championships in Seoul, South Korea, finishing in seventh place. "I feel good," she said after the free skate. "I think I skated better than in previous times, so I'm satisfied. I'm glad that two important competitions have come to an end. Now there will be a short break, and then back to work for the World Championships. I want to work on everything, but especially the cleanliness of the programs. It's already become easier than in the beginning of the season. That's already a big plus. Now I want to polish everything. Maybe we'll add something new, but don't know yet. We'll work on it."

Selected to compete at the 2025 World Championships in Boston, Massachusetts, United States, Samodelkina finished the event in fourteenth place. Her placement earned a quota for Kazakhstan at the 2026 Winter Olympics.

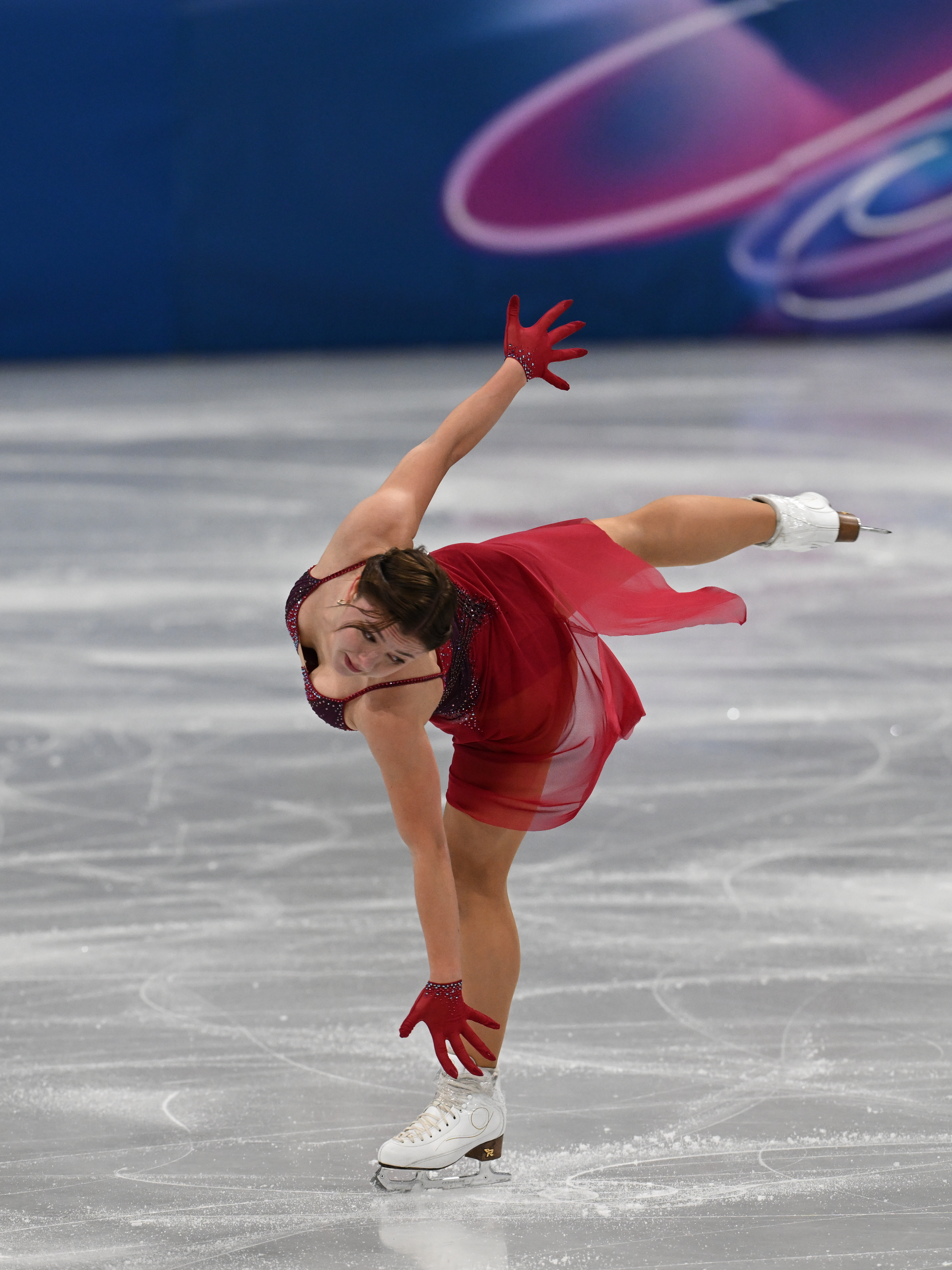
Samodelkina performing her free skate at the 2026 Winter Olympics

==== 2025–26 season: Milano Cortina Olympics, Grand Prix silver ====
In late July, it was announced that Samodelkina had moved to Los Angeles, California, United States and that Rafael Arutyunyan had become her head coach. The following month, she started the season by competing at the 2025 CS Cranberry Cup International, where she won the silver medal behind Isabeau Levito. In late September, Samodelkina announced her withdrawal from the 2025 CS Denis Ten Memorial Challenge due to an injury. Two months later, she won the silver medal at the 2025 NHK Trophy behind Kaori Sakamoto. In doing so, she became the first woman from Kazakhstan to win a Grand Prix medal. "When I saw I had the silver medal, I was so excited!" she said. "It's a good motivation to keep going. I got just one Grand Prix. My coach Rafael (Arutyunyan) told me maybe after my NHK Trophy I maybe will get an opportunity to go to Skate America or Finland." Although, she was invited to compete at the 2025 Finlandia Trophy to replace Niina Petrõkina, Samodelkina was unable to obtain a visa to enter Finland on time.

Samodelkina performing her free program at the 2026 World Championships

In December, Samodelkina won the bronze medal at the 2025 CS Golden Spin of Zagreb. The following month, she competed at the 2026 Four Continents Championships in Beijing, China, finishing in ninth place overall.

In February 2026, Samodelkina competed at the 2026 Olympic Games in Milan, Italy. She placed twelfth in the short program but rose to tenth in the free skate, finishing in tenth place overall, garnering personal bests in both segments of the competition.

A month following the Olympics, Sofia competed at the 2026 World Championships in Prague, finishing in twelfth place overall after placing twelfth in both the short program and the free skate. She struggled with a few of her jumping passes, confirming an ongoing knee injury later on with the media press; "My injury still worries me, and that why I wasn't able to train well. I was training for 1-1.5 hours a day because I was really caring for my knee. Now I'm going to go home and hope to recover my knee and my body. I just want to take a rest".

==== 2026–27 season ====
Samodelkina opened her season at the 2026 CS Denis Ten Memorial Challenge where she won the bronze medal behind Yujae Kim of Korea and Alexandra Trusova, a neutral athlete. Samodelkina showcased the triple Axel jump during training sessions and shared that she hopes to incorporate it into her programs during the Grand Prix series. "It's in working condition; I've only started doing it recently. We've been working a lot on 2A from different entries. I want to include the Triple Axel at the Grand Prix in Canada" she shared.

In October, Samodelkina placed fifth overall at the 2026 Skate Canada International, garnering a new personal best short program score of 71.84. Having previously set a goal to perform a triple axel at this competition, she decided against it: "I really wanna make my triple axel stable and add a quad too...I really wanna show it because I know I can do it, but now it's kind of 50/50, and I don't really like to risk. I don't think I need to do it right now. So I'm gonna improve my triple Axel, maybe recover my quad, and include it in my program. That's my plan for this season. I hope I'm gonna do it by Skate America. Let's dream a little bit."

In November, Samodelkina competed at 2026 Skate America, placing 11th in the short program, she rose to fourth in the free skate, concluding the event in fifth place overall. She included a triple Axel in her free skate, a jump she had not attempted ever since she was a junior skater. Although the jump was slightly under rotated, she completed the remaining jumps cleanly. Samodelkina said she had discussed the decision with her coach, Rafael Arutyunyan, who supported her attempt while reminding her to maintain focus on the remainder of the program. Samodelkina became the first female Kazakh skater to attempt and land a triple Axel jump, although not ratified due to under rotation.

== Programs ==
Competition and exhibition programs by season
Season	Short program	Free skate program	Exhibition program
2019–20	Romeo and Juliet: 1. Aimer; Composed by Gérard Presgurvic; Performed by André Rieu; 2. Dance of the Knights; Composed by Sergei Prokofiev	Medley: 1. "The Snowstorm"; Composed by Georgy Sviridov; 2. "Masquerade Waltz"; Composed by Aram Khachaturian	—N/a
2020–21	Romeo and Juliet	Medley: The Snowstorm; Masquerade Waltz	—N/a
2021–22	Summer of '42: Composed by Michel Legrand; Choreo. by Viktoria Bondarenko	Habanera: From Carmen; Composed by Georges Bizet; Performed by Aria; Choreo. by Viktoria Bondarenko	Medley: The Snowstorm; Masquerade Waltz
2022–23	"Can't Help Falling in Love": By Elvis Presley; Performed by Diana Ankudinova	Medley: "Ave Maria" & "Stranger": Composed by Igor Krutoy; Performed by Dimash Qudaibergen	—N/a
2023–24	—N/a	—N/a	"I've Seen That Face Before (Libertango)" (Based on Libertango by Astor Piazzolla): By Grace Jones; Performed By Sharon Kovacs
2023–24	—N/a	—N/a	"Je suis malade": By Serge Lama & Alice Dona; Performed by Lara Fabian
2024–25	"Survivor": From Tomb Raider; By Destiny's Child'; Performed by 2WEI; Choreo. by Nikita Mikhailov	"Je suis malade"	Boléro (Remix): Composed by Maurice Ravel
2024–25	"I've Seen That Face Before (Libertango)"	Medley: Ave Maria; Stranger	Boléro (Remix)
2025–26	Czardas / Czardas Caprice Medley: 1. Czardas; Composed by Vittorio Monti; Performed by Sarah Nemtanu & Chilly Gonzales; 2. Czardas Caprice; By Ilan Rechtman & Lara St. John; Choreo. by Shae-Lynn Bourne	Sunset Boulevard: Composed by Andrew Lloyd Webber; Performed by Nicole Scherzinger; Choreo. by Joey Russell; Tracks used: 1. Entr'acte; 2. The Final Scene; 3. With One Look	"...Baby One More Time": By Britney Spears
2026–27	Medley: Performed by Nancy Sinatra; Choreo. by Shae-Lynn Bourne; Tracks used: 1. "Bang Bang (My Baby Shot Me Down)"; 2. "These Boots Are Made for Walkin'"	Rivals soundtrack: Choreo. by Shae-Lynn Bourne	"Macarena": By Los Del Río

== Competitive highlights ==
- GP – Event of the ISU Grand Prix Series
- CS – Event of the ISU Challenger Series
- JGP – Event of the ISU Junior Grand Prix Series
- TBD – Assigned
- WD – Withdrew from competition

=== Women's singles (for Kazakhstan) ===
Competition placements at senior level
Season	2024–25	2025–26	2026–27
Winter Olympics		10th	
World Championships	14th	12th	
Four Continents Championships	7th	9th	
Kazakh Championships	1st		
GP NHK Trophy		2nd	
GP Skate America			5th
GP Skate Canada			5th
CS Cranberry Cup		2nd	
CS Denis Ten Memorial	2nd		3rd
CS Golden Spin of Zagreb		3rd	
CS Tallinn Trophy	2nd		
Asian Games	4th		
Winter University Games	3rd		

Competition placements at junior level
Season	2024–25
JGP Turkey	4th

=== Women's singles (for Russia) ===
Competition placements at senior level
Season	2021–22	2022–23
Russian Championships	4th	11th
Russian Grand Prix Final		11th

Competition placements at junior level
Season	2019–20	2020–21	2021–22
Russian Championships	4th	4th	2nd
JGP Russia			3rd
JGP Slovenia			2nd
Denis Ten Memorial			1st

== Detailed results ==
=== Women's singles (for Kazakhstan) ===
ISU personal best scores in the +5/-5 GOE System
Segment	Type	Score	Event
Total	TSS	207.46	2026 Winter Olympics
Short program	TSS	71.84	2026 Skate Canada International
Short program	TES	40.63	2026 Skate Canada International
Short program	PCS	32.39	2026 CS Denis Ten Memorial
Free skating	TSS	138.99	2026 Winter Olympics
Free skating	TES	73.77	2026 Winter Olympics
Free skating	PCS	65.60	2025 NHK Trophy

==== Senior level ====
Results in the 2026-27 season
Date	Event	SP		FS		Total	
Date	Event	P	Score	P	Score	P	Score
8–11 Oct 2026	(Kazakhstan) 2026 CS Denis Ten Memorial Challenge	3	69.45	2	134.91	3	204.36
30 Oct – 1 Nov 2026	2026 Skate Canada International	5	71.84	5	135.05	5	206.89
13–15 Nov 2026	(United States) 2026 Skate America	11	61.03	4	137.56	5	198.59

Results in the 2025–26 season
Date	Event	SP		FS		Total	
Date	Event	P	Score	P	Score	P	Score
7–10 Aug 2025	(United States) 2025 CS Cranberry Cup International	2	65.80	1	137.35	2	203.15
7–9 Nov 2025	(Japan) 2025 NHK Trophy	2	67.75	3	132.25	2	200.00
3–6 Dec 2025	(Croatia) 2025 CS Golden Spin of Zagreb	7	56.28	3	126.35	3	182.63
21–25 Jan 2026	(China) 2026 Four Continents Championships	9	62.29	7	120.22	9	182.51
17–19 Feb 2026	(Italy) 2026 Winter Olympics	12	68.47	10	138.99	10	207.46
24–29 Mar 2026	(Czech Republic) 2026 World Championships	12	66.95	12	120.58	12	187.53

Results in the 2024–25 season
Date	Event	SP		FS		Total	
Date	Event	P	Score	P	Score	P	Score
3–6 Oct 2024	(Kazakhstan) 2024 CS Denis Ten Memorial Challenge	3	63.84	3	125.83	2	189.67
12–17 Nov 2024	(Estonia) 2024 CS Tallinn Trophy	3	53.98	2	119.27	2	173.25
14–15 Dec 2024	2025 Kazakhstan Championships	1	57.60	1	118.10	1	175.70
16–18 Jan 2025	(Italy) 2025 Winter World University Games	2	66.43	4	124.53	3	190.96
11–13 Feb 2025	(China) 2025 Asian Winter Games	4	63.31	4	125.12	4	188.43
19–23 Feb 2025	(South Korea) 2025 Four Continents Championships	8	63.98	6	129.39	7	193.37
26–30 Mar 2025	(United States) 2025 World Championships	13	63.58	13	117.78	14	181.36

==== Junior level ====
Results in the 2024–25 season
Date	Event	SP		FS		Total	
Date	Event	P	Score	P	Score	P	Score
18–21 Sep 2024	2024 JGP Turkey	8	57.14	4	117.44	4	174.58

=== Women's singles (for Russia) ===
==== Senior level ====
2022–2023 season
Date	Event	SP	FS	Total
3–5 March 2023	2023 Russian Grand Prix Final	11; 61.28	11; 124.26	11; 185.54
20–25 December 2022	2023 Russian Championships	8; 71.64	11; 128.08	11; 199.72

==== Junior level ====
2021–22 season
Date	Event	Level	SP	FS	Total
18–22 January 2022	2022 Russian Junior Championships	Junior	2; 75.51	4; 138.22	2; 213.73
21–26 December 2021	2022 Russian Championships	Senior	4; 76.74	4; 156.35	4; 233.09
27–31 October 2021	2021 Denis Ten Memorial Challenge	Junior	1; 70.29	1; 145.30	1; 215.59
22–25 September 2021	2021 JGP Slovenia	Junior	4; 65.56	1; 140.11	2; 205.67
15–18 September 2021	2021 JGP Russia	Junior	6; 60.76	2; 141.63	3; 202.39
2020–21 season
26 February – 3 March 2021	2021 Russian Cup Final	Junior	3; 71.00	2; 152.67	2; 223.67
1–5 February 2021	2021 Russian Junior Championships	Junior	4; 71.37	3; 136.27	4; 207.64
9–12 December 2020	2020 Moscow Championships	Junior	1; 73.25	1; 127.73	1; 200.98
2019–20 season
18–22 February 2020	2020 Russian Cup Final	Junior	1; 77.05	1; 147.47	1; 224.52
4–8 February 2020	2020 Russian Junior Championships	Junior	4; 68.38	4; 139.12	4; 207.50
