= Artem Kovalev =

Russian figure skater

Personal information
- Native name: Артём Сергеевич Ковалёв (Russian)
- Full name: Artem Sergeevich Kovalev
- Other names: Artyom Kovalyov
- Born: 27 June 2003 (age 23) Moscow, Russia
- Home town: Moscow
- Height: 1.90 m (6 ft 3 in)

Figure skating career
- Country: Russia
- Coach: Alexander Volkov; Martine Dagenais; Elena Ryvkina
- Skating club: FS School of Alexander Volkov
- Began skating: 2007

Artem Sergeevich Kovalev (Russian: Артём Сергеевич Ковалёв; born 27 June 2003) is a Russian figure skater. He is the 2019 CS Ice Star silver medalist and the 2019 Volvo Open Cup champion.

== Programs ==
Season	Short program	Free skating
2023–2024	From Now On; Come Alive (from The Greatest Showman) by Pasek and Paul	Remember; Hector's Death (from Troy) by James Horner performed by Josh Groban
2022–2023	House of Flying Daggers by Shigeru Umebayashi; Samurai Collection by Kiyoshi Yoshida choreo. by Martine Dagenais	Remember; Hector's Death (from Troy) by James Horner performed by Josh Groban
2021–2022	House of Flying Daggers by Shigeru Umebayashi; Samurai Collection by Kiyoshi Yoshida choreo. by Martine Dagenais	Don't Stop Me Now; Bohemian Rhapsody; Another One Bites the Dust (from Bohemian Rhapsody) by Queen choreo. by Martine Dagenais
2020–2021	Adagio in G minor by Tomaso Albinoni performed by André Rieu choreo. by Martine Dagenais	Don't Stop Me Now; Bohemian Rhapsody; Another One Bites the Dust (from Bohemian Rhapsody) by Queen choreo. by Martine Dagenais
2019–2020	Adagio in G minor by Tomaso Albinoni performed by André Rieu choreo. by Martine Dagenais	Granada performed by André Rieu; Concierto de Aranjuez by Joaquín Rodrigo; Innuendo by Queen choreo. by Martine Dagenais
2018–2019	The Passenger (from Batman Forever) by Iggy Pop performed by Michael Hutchence; Stand Up by Garou choreo. by Martine Dagenais	Granada performed by André Rieu; Concierto de Aranjuez by Joaquín Rodrigo; Innuendo by Queen choreo. by Martine Dagenais
2017–2018	Give It Up by The Good Men; Cherry Pink and Apple Blossom White performed by Enoch Light choreo. by Martine Dagenais	House of Flying Daggers by Shigeru Umebayashi; Samurai Collection by Kiyoshi Yoshida choreo. by Martine Dagenais
2016–2017	Miserere by Bruno Pelletier choreo. by Martine Dagenais	House of Flying Daggers by Shigeru Umebayashi; Samurai Collection by Kiyoshi Yoshida choreo. by Martine Dagenais

== Competitive highlights ==
GP: Grand Prix; CS: Challenger Series; JGP: Junior Grand Prix

International
Event	15–16	16–17	17–18	18–19	19–20	20–21	21–22	22–23	25-26
GP Rostelecom						11th			
CS Ice Star					2nd				
Ice Star				10th					
Santa Claus Cup							2nd		
Volvo Open Cup					1st				
International: Junior
JGP Austria				6th			2nd		
JGP Germany		6th							
JGP Japan		6th							
JGP Russia							4th		
Ice Star		1st							
National
Russian Champ.				14th		8th	12th	5th	12th
Russian Junior	14th	12th		12th	8th	9th	3rd		
Russian Cup Final (Note: The 2023 Russian Cup Final was renamed as the 2023 Russian Grand Prix Final.)	2nd J	8th J		6th	2nd J	6th	2nd J	10th	
Levels: J = Junior; TBD = Assigned; WD = Withdrew
