= Mark Kondratiuk =

Russian figure skater (born 2003)

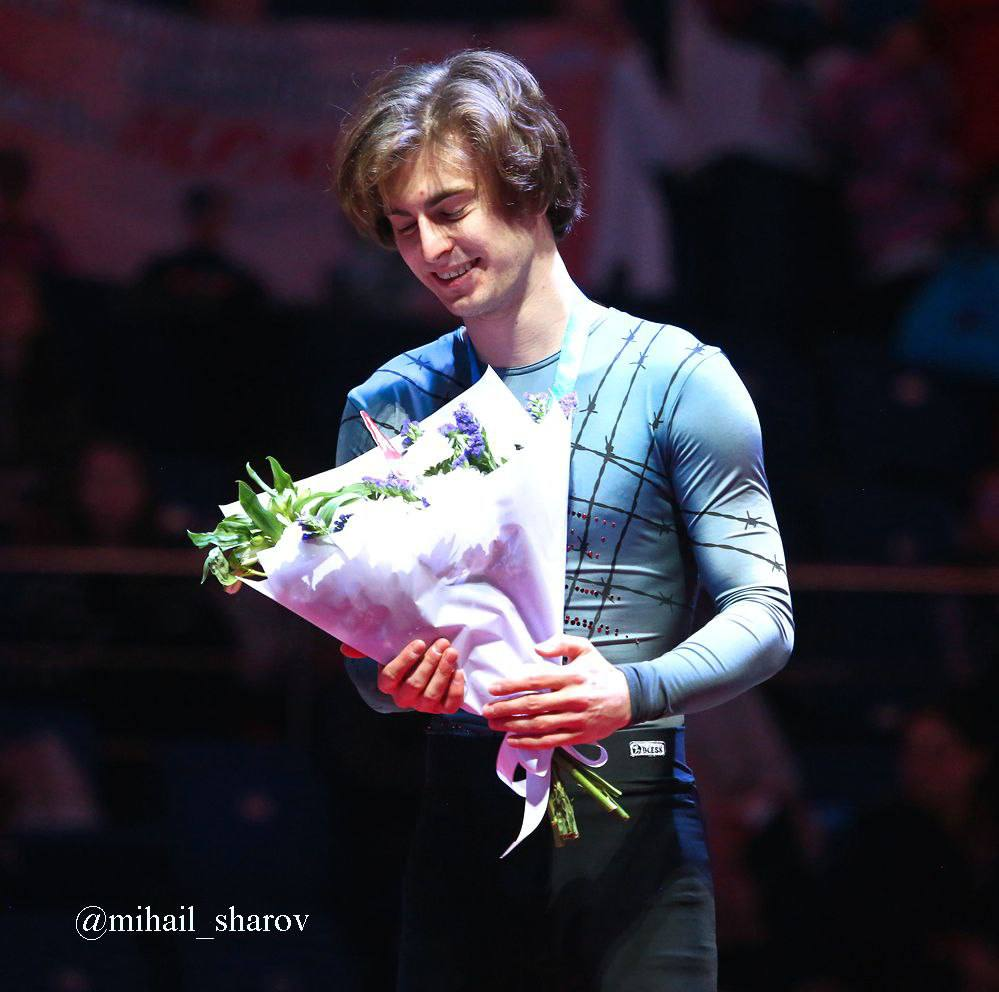
- Mark Kondratiuk in 2025

Personal information
- Native name: Марк Валерьевич Кондратюк
- Full name: Mark Valeryevich Kondratiuk
- Other names: Kondratyuk
- Born: 3 September 2003 (age 23) Podolsk, Russia
- Home town: Moscow, Russia
- Height: 1.69 m (5 ft 7 in)

Figure skating career
- Country: Russia
- Discipline: Men's singles
- Coach: Svetlana Sokolovskaya; Lilia Biktagirova
- Skating club: "Our Hopes" (Moscow)
- Began skating: 2006

Medal record
Olympic Games
Bronze medal – third place	2022 Beijing	Team
European Championships
Gold medal – first place	2022 Tallinn	Singles
Russian Championships
Gold medal – first place	2022 Saint Petersburg	Singles
Bronze medal – third place	2021 Chelyabinsk	Singles
Bronze medal – third place	2026 Saint Petersburg	Singles

Mark Valeryevich Kondratiuk (Russian: Марк Валерьевич Кондратюк; born 3 September 2003) is a Russian figure skater. He is a 2022 Olympic bronze medalist in the team event, (Note: On 29 January 2024 CAS disqualified Valieva for four years retroactive to 25 December 2021 for an anti-doping rule violation. On 30 January 2024 the ISU reallocated medals to upgrade the United States to gold and Japan to silver while downgrading ROC to bronze.) 2022 European champion, a two-time Challenger Series medalist and the 2022 Russian national champion. Member of ROC Athletes’ Commission since September 2025.

== Personal life ==
Kondratiuk was born on 3 September 2003 in Podolsk, Russia. After a visit to the Tate Modern Museum , he became interested in art and started painting. His favorite artists are Kazimir Malevich, Jean-Michel Basquiat, and Hieronymus Bosch. Mark graduated from Plekhanov Russian University of Economics in 2026.

In March 2025 Mark Kondratiuk became a winner of Russian Challenge, a TV show of exhibition figure skating programs, where he skated the satire scene for the music from Don Quixote with Sofia Samodurova. He also won the special prizes for artistry in 2024 and 2025 and choreography in 2026.

Kondratiuk was in a relationship with Alexandra Trusova in 2022.

In December 2022, the Ukrainian Parliament sanctioned Kondratiuk for his support of the 2022 Russian invasion of Ukraine because of the awards ceremony after the Olympics 2022.

== Career ==
=== Early years ===
Kondratiuk began learning to skate in 2006. As a child, he was coached by Lyudmila Sapronova.

By 2016, he was being coached by Svetlana Sokolovskaia. He placed sixteenth at the 2017 Russian Junior Championships. Over the following seasons, he appeared at several junior internationals, winning five medals, but received no ISU Junior Grand Prix assignments. Kondratiuk was diagnosed with Osgood–Schlatter disease at age 13; as a result, he missed one season of competition and briefly considered leaving the sport before opting to continue.

=== 2019–20 season ===
In November, making his senior international debut, Kondratiuk won gold at the Bosphorus Cup in Turkey. In January, he took silver at the Mentor Toruń Cup in Poland.

=== 2020–21 season: National bronze medal ===
Competing on the domestic Russian Cup series, Kondratiuk placed eighth in the first stage in Moscow and seventh in the fourth stage in Kazan. These results qualified him only as an alternate for the 2021 Russian Championships initially, but he was added to the roster following the withdrawal of Artur Danielian, the previous year's silver medalist.

Ranked third in the short program and second in the free skate, he won the bronze medal at the event, which took place in Chelyabinsk in December. Kondratiuk was a virtual unknown before the championship, making his bronze medal a considerable surprise, with commentators remarking that he "basically came out of nowhere."

Kondratiuk's success at the national championships led to his being invited to compete in the 2021 Channel One Trophy team competition, where he was selected for the "Time of Firsts" team captained by Evgenia Medvedeva. He ranked third in the short program and finished first in the free skate, ahead of national champion Mikhail Kolyada. He subsequently expressed a hope to qualify for the second Russian men's berth at the 2021 World Championships by competing at the Russian Cup Final. Kondratiuk struggled at the event, placing fifth overall.

=== 2021–22 season: European champion, National champion, Beijing Olympic Games ===
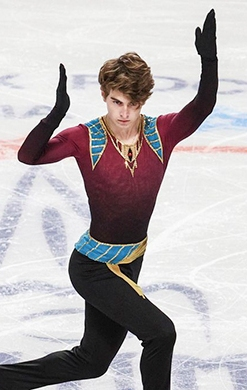
Kondratiuk performing at the 2021 Russian Championships

Kondratiuk was initially scheduled to make his ISU Junior Grand Prix debut at the first of two JGP events held in Courchevel, France, in August 2021, but he, along with his Russian teammates, was forced to withdraw from the competition as Russia's Sputnik V COVID-19 vaccine did not meet France's standards for adequate vaccination. After a strong performance at the senior Russian test skates, he was instead assigned to the 2021 CS Nebelhorn Trophy to qualify for a third Olympic berth for Russian men following the results of the 2021 World Championships earlier in the year. Kondratiuk was successful in his endeavour, placing fifth in the short program and second in the free skate to win the bronze medal and take the third of seven available Olympic spots.

Kondratiuk competed at a second Challenger event, taking the silver medal at the 2021 CS Denis Ten Memorial Challenge. He was then assigned to make his Grand Prix debut at the 2021 Rostelecom Cup, where he placed eighth.

At the 2022 Russian Championships, Kondratiuk placed second in the short program with a score of 97.77, 0.26 behind segment leader Evgeni Semenenko. He was only third in the free skate but narrowly won the gold medal, 0.67 points ahead of silver medalist Mikhail Kolyada. He described himself as shocked, deferring to Kolyada as "leader of the Russian men's team" despite the result, adding, "today I might be the leader, but overall I am not."

Making his debut at the European championships in Tallinn, Kondratiuk skated a clean short program and placed second in the segment, 0.70 points behind segment leader Andrei Mozalev. He went on to win the free skate and take the gold medal. Kondratiuk deemed the result a "kind of miracle," as he had only been hoping for a placement in the top three. On January 20, he was officially named to the Russian Olympic team.

Kondratiuk began the Games as the Russian entry in the men's short program of the Olympic team event. Skating cleanly, albeit with a few held landings, he placed third behind Nathan Chen and Shoma Uno, securing eight points for the Russian team. In the free program, Kondratiuk doubled the planned triple Salchow in his triple Lutz-Euler-triple Salchow combination, but otherwise skated cleanly to finish second in the segment behind Yuma Kagiyama and earn nine more points towards Team Russia's combined score. Team Russia, composed of Kondratiuk, Kamila Valieva, pairs skaters Anastasia Mishina / Aleksandr Galliamov, and ice dancers Victoria Sinitsina / Nikita Katsalapov, at first took the gold medal ahead of Team USA and Team Japan, but the retroactive disqualification of Valieva by the Court of Arbitration for Sport demoted them to bronze. Kondratiuk became the youngest Olympic champion in the team event at 18 years and 157 days old, being 45 days younger than Dick Button, who won the men's singles at 18 years and 202 days. He next competed in the men's event. In the short program Kondratiuk turned out on the landings on both his quad attempts, managing only a quad Salchow - double toeloop combination instead of the intended quad-triple. He ranked in fifteenth place in the short program. Kondratiuk performed an error ridden free program, stepping out of his first triple axel attempt, popping the second to a single and falling on his quad triple combination. He ranked fourteenth in the free skate and remained fifteenth overall.

Kondratiuk was originally planning on ending his competitive season at the 2022 World Figure Skating Championships Russian athletes were barred from international competition.

=== 2022–23 season ===
Due to the Russia's invasion to Ukraine, the Russian athletes were banned from competing in international ISU events. The athletes continued to compete domestically, with the top skaters participating in events such as the internal Grand Prix Stages, national championship and Final Grand Prix, as well as commercial tournaments.

Kondratiuk opted to include a quad Lutz in his both his short and free programs. His original free skate layout included five quad jumps, but an unsuccessful presentation at the test skates led him to reduced the amount to three, as well as change his music from "Selma" to "Luna" after. He won the Grand Prix Stage 2 in Sochi with two quads in short program and three quads in the free skate, with a total score of 279.00 points. For his second Grand Prix event in Samara, Kondratiuk was leading after the short program, but dropped to third overall after a series of errors in the free skate. It was later announced that Kondratiuk had sustained an injury and spent a few days in the hospital afterwards. Despite this, he opted to compete at the Russians Championships 2023 but withdrew from the free skate. Kondratiuk returned to competition at the Grand Prix Final 2023 where he finished third and qualified for the national reserve team.

=== 2023–24 season ===
Skating to "Cantos de Fuego" and "Ode to Joy", Mark ended up in 10th place in the Russian Nationals and came in 2nd in the Russian Grand Prix Final with the season best of 297.72 that allowed him to enter the national team. Although the season didn't go smoothly, Kondratiuk consistently included 4 quads in his free program. At the Jumping Championship 2024 he presented the best combination of two jumps quad salchow and triple axel that was scored 20.29.

=== 2024–25 season ===
Mark started the season with triumph at the test skates, where he presented the clean energized short program for "Bangarang" and landed 5 quads in his free program, quad flip including. He repeated the success at the local competition "In memory of Olympic champion S. Grinkov" getting 281.95 points and at his first Grand Prix stage in Magnitogorsk getting 289.74 points. This achievement secured Kondratiuk as the first Russian male skater landed five quads and a combination of the two triple axels in free program. For his second Grand Prix stage in Moscow arrived the third overall being scored 289.11. In 2025 Mark won the short program both at the Russian Nationals and at the Russian Final Grand Prix. He finished 5th in overall at the Nationals due to multiple mistakes because of the illness being scored 274.07, and came in the 2nd place at Russian Grand Prix Final after the fall on his quad flip with his season best 294.06.

In the end of the season, Svetlana Sokolovskaya and her team, Mark including, left CSKA and moved to the new academy "Our Hopes" under Moscow Figure Skating Federation governance.

=== 2025–26 season: National bronze medal ===
Mark has won gold at Russian Grand Prix events in Magnitogorsk and in Moscow. This season he skates with only four quads in his free program with a focus on PCS. Came in third at the Russian Nationals. Mark had experienced problems with his toe loop through the season and didn't have a clean landing of this jump for most of the season.

=== 2026–27 season ===
On 30 June 2026, the International Skating Union announced that figure skaters from Russia and Belarus would be allowed to compete at international competitions as Individual Neutral Athletes (AINs). Each of these skaters are be required to undergo an individual assessment conducted by the ISU Council to determine whether they meet the criteria for neutral status. Kondratiuk's application was approved, making him eligible to compete internationally as a neutral athlete.

Following the weeks of Kondratiuk's neutral status being granted, it was later temporarily revoked following a letter sent to the ISU from the Ukrainian federation citing several questionings in regard to Mark's neutral status. Seven other Russian skaters were named in the letter. Kondratiuk was scheduled to compete at the 2026 Kinoshita Group Cup that same week, being forced to withdraw three days before the event commenced; Vladislav Dikidzhi replaced him. Kondratiuk challenged the ISU on their decision but was again denied. He was given three weeks to appeal the case with the Court of Arbitration of Sport.

== Programs ==
Season	Short program	Free skating	Exhibition
2026–2027	Sind by Faraualla	Nocturne 20 in C-Sharp Minor by Frederic Chopin; Gangsta's Paradise by 2WEI, Coolio & L.V. and State of Mine	
2025–2026	Hava Nagila (Jewish Folk Song) performed by The Jewish Starlight Orchestra and Gruppa Express choreo. by Nikita Mikhailov, Peter Tchernyshev	Schindler's List by John Williams performed by Mathias Fritsche choreo. by Nikita Mikhailov, Nikita Katsalapov	Warp 1.9; Storm by The Bloody Beetroots; Bangarang by Skrillex and Sirah choreo. by Nikita Mikhailov; Going to Caravan by Levi.Sct choreo. by Ilya Averbukh; L'enfer by Stromae
2024–2025	Warp 1.9; Storm by The Bloody Beetroots; Bangarang by Skrillex and Sirah choreo. by Nikita Mikhailov	Raamam Raaghavam; Ram The Volcano (from RRR) by M. M. Keeravani and Siva Shakthi Datta; Latika's Theme (from Slumdog Millionaire) by A. R. Rahman performed by Suzanne D'Mello; Nagada Sang Dhol (from Goliyon Ki Raasleela Ram-Leela) by Sanjay Leela Bhansali choreo. by Nikita Mikhailov	Dancing On the Broken Glass by Maxim Fadeev; Don Quixote by Ludwig Minkus choreo. by Ilya Averbukh
2023–2024	Cantos de Fuego by Brand X Music choreo. by Nikita Mikhailov	Ode to Joy by Ludwig van Beethoven performed by Atom Music Audio and The Dark Tenor choreo. by Nikita Mikhailov	Euphoria by Aydar Gaynullin choreo. by Ilya Averbukh
2022–2023	What Is Jazz by Club des Belugas choreo. by Nikita Mikhailov	Luna by Alessandro Safina choreo. by Ilya Averbukh; Overture; Selma (from Broken Wings) by Nadim Naaman and Dana Al Fardan; Holding Hands (from Nuan) by San Bao choreo. by Nikita Mikhailov	Preparation (from The Little Prince) by Hans Zimmer; Stream Adrián Berenguer; Sweet Dreams (Are Made of This) by Eurythmics choreo. by Ilya Averbukh
2021–2022	Kösem Opening Theme; Silence of the Clouds (from Magnificent Century: Kösem) by Aytekin Ataş; Sound of Darbuka by Yasar Akpence choreo. by Vitali Butikov & Nikita Mikhailov	Overture; The Temple (from Jesus Christ Superstar) by Andrew Lloyd Webber choreo. by Vitali Butikov & Nikita Mikhailov	Cradles by Sub Urban choreo. by Ilya Averbukh
2020–2021	Summertime performed by Larry Adler choreo. by Nikita Mikhailov	A Swan Is Born (from Black Swan) by Clint Mansell; After the Nightmare by The Dark Tenor choreo. by Nikita Mikhailov	
2019–2020	Don't Worry, Be Happy; The Hollywood Wiz performed by Cirque du Soleil choreo. by Nikita Mikhailov	Exogenesis: Symphony Part 3 (Redemption) by Muse choreo. by Nikita Mikhailov	

== Competitive highlights ==
GP: Grand Prix; CS: Challenger Series; JGP: Junior Grand Prix

International
Event	16–17	17–18	18–19	19–20	20–21	21–22	22–23	23–24	24–25	25–26	26–27
Olympics						15th					
Europeans						1st					
GP Rostelecom						8th					
CS Denis Ten MC						2nd					
CS Nebelhorn						3rd					
Bosphorus Cup				1st							
Toruń Cup				2nd							
International: Junior
JGP France						WD					
Bosphorus Cup			1st								
Denis Ten MC				3rd							
Ice Star			3rd	1st							
Skate Helena			2nd								
National
Russian Champ.					3rd	1st	WD	10th	5th	3rd	
Russian Junior	16th										
Russian Cup Final (Note: The 2023 Russian Cup Final was renamed as the 2023 Russian Grand Prix Final.)							3rd	2nd	2nd		
Team events
Olympics						3 T					

== Detailed results ==
Small medals for short and free programs awarded only at ISU Championships. At team events, medals awarded for team results only. ISU Personal Bests highlighted in bold.

=== Senior level ===
**2025–26 season**
Date	Event	SP	FS	Total
17-21 December 2025	2026 Russian Championships	10; 86.06	3; 195.02	3; 281.08
**2024–25 season**
Date	Event	SP	FS	Total
13–17 February 2025	2025 Russian Grand Prix Final	1; 104.70	3; 189.36	2; 294.06
18–22 December 2024	2025 Russian Championships	1; 105.04	8; 169.03	5; 274.07
**2023–24 season**
Date	Event	SP	FS	Total
14–19 February 2024	2024 Russian Grand Prix Final	4; 98.35	2; 199.37	2; 297.72
20–24 December 2023	2024 Russian Championships	11; 80.97	7; 168.11	10; 249.08
**2022–23 season**
Date	Event	SP	FS	Total
14–19 February 2023	2023 Russian Grand Prix Final	1; 102.86	7; 170.54	3; 273.40
20–26 December 2022	2023 Russian Championships	12; 77.50	WD	WD
**2021–22 season**
Date	Event	SP	FS	Total
February 8–10, 2022	2022 Winter Olympics	15; 86.11	14; 162.71	15; 248.82
February 4–7, 2022	2022 Winter Olympics – Team event	3; 95.81	2; 181.65	3^{T}
January 10–16, 2022	2022 European Championships	2; **99.06**	1; **187.50**	1; **286.56**
December 21–26, 2021	2022 Russian Championships	2; 97.77	3; 186.60	1; 284.37
November 26–28, 2021	2021 Rostelecom Cup	11; 74.16	8; 157.72	8; 231.88
October 28–31, 2021	2021 CS Denis Ten Memorial Challenge	2; 84.79	2; 165.29	2; 250.08
September 22–25, 2021	2021 CS Nebelhorn Trophy	5; 81.48	2; 159.58	3; 241.06
**2020–21 season**
Feb. 26 – Mar. 2, 2021	2021 Russian Cup Final	8; 83.56	4; 167.21	5; 250.77
February 5–7, 2021	2021 Channel One Trophy	3; 96.89	1; 196.23	2T/2P; 293.12
December 23–27, 2020	2021 Russian Championships	3; 90.88	2; 169.43	3; 260.31
**2019–20 season**
January 7–12, 2020	2020 Mentor Toruń Cup	1; 68.77	2; 135.90	2; 204.67
November 25–30, 2019	2019 Bosphorus Cup	2; 70.46	1; 143.01	1; 213.47

=== Junior level ===
**2019–20 season**
Date	Event	SP	FS	Total
February 18–22, 2020	2020 Russian Cup Junior Final	2; 78.23	4; 140.72	4; 218.95
October 14–17, 2019	2019 Ice Star	1; 71.75	1; 127.21	1; 198.96
October 9–12, 2019	2019 Denis Ten Memorial Challenge	3; 67.48	5; 114.56	3; 182.04
**2018–19 season**
February 18–22, 2019	2019 Russian Cup Junior Final	8; 68.64	9; 130.94	9; 199.58
January 16–19, 2019	2019 Skate Helena	2; 56.00	2; 124.49	2; 180.49
Nov. 28 – Dec. 1, 2018	2018 Bosphorus Cup	1; 63.74	1; 125.42	1; 189.16
October 18–21, 2018	2018 Ice Star	3; 62.85	3; 123.10	3; 185.95
**2016–17 season**
March 1–5, 2017	2017 Russian Junior Championships	14; 66.75	16; 122.52	16; 189.27
February 12–16, 2017	2017 Russian Cup Junior Final	10; 65.16	10; 126.24	10; 191.40
