= Svetlana Sokolovskaya =

Russian figure skating coach

Svetlana Vladimirovna Sokolovskaya

Personal information
- Full name: Svetlana Vladimirovna Sokolovskaya
- Born: 10 December 1965 (age 60) Norilsk, Russian SFSR, Soviet Union

Figure skating career
- Country: Russia
- Skating club: CSKA Moscow
- Began skating: 1971
- Retired: 1987

Svetlana Vladimirovna Sokolovskaya (Russian: Светлана Владимировна Соколовская; born 10 December 1965) is a Russian figure skating coach.

== Personal life ==
Sokolovskaya was born in Norilsk to a family of doctors. She studied at the Ust-Kamenogorsk Pedagogical Institute in Oskemen.

Together with her husband, she has a daughter, Elizabeth, born in 1990. Her granddaughter Alexandra began skating at age 3. Sokolovskaya enjoys skiing and playing basketball.

== Skating career ==
Sokolovskaya began skating at age six in Norilsk. Her first coach was Zhanna Gromova, who also coached Irina Slutskaya.

She failed to achieve significant results in single skating and grew 12 cm tall, so her coach transferred her to ice dancing under the guidance of Yuri Razbeglov. Sokolovskaya quickly came to the conclusion that she really did not want to skate, but wanted to teach. She then entered the Pedagogical Institute in Oskemen in order to began her coaching career.

== Coaching career ==
After graduating from high school in 1987, Sokolovskaya began coaching. Her current students include:

- (Russia) Alexander Samarin
- (Russia) Grigory Fedorov
- (Bulgaria) Maria Levushkina
- (Russia) Mark Kondratiuk
- (Russia) Nikolai Kolesnikov
- (Russia) Timofei Platonov
- (Russia) Daniil Samsonov

Former students:

- (Russia) Alexandra Trusova
- (Georgia (country)) Alina Urushadze
- (Armenia) Anastasiya Galustyan
- (Russia) / (Switzerland) Anna Ovcharova
- (Russia) Arina Martynova
- (Australia) Ekaterina Alexandrovskaya
- (Kazakhstan) Elizabet Tursynbaeva
- (Azerbaijan) Ivan Blagov
- (Russia) Katarina Gerboldt
- (Russia) Lilia Biktagirova
- (Russia) Maria Sotskova
- (Israel) Nelli Ioffe
- (Russia) / (Israel) Polina Shelepen
- (Russia) Svetlana Panova
- (Russia) Zhan Bush
- (Russia) Sofia Samodelkina
- (Russia) Kamila Valieva
