= Troy (soundtrack) =

Troy: Music from the Motion Picture

Soundtrack album by James Horner
- Released: May 11, 2004
- Recorded: 2002–2003
- Genres: Opera, Soundtrack
- Length: 75 mins
- Label: Warner Bros. / Reprise Records
- Producers: James Horner, Simon Rhodes, track12 David Foster

Troy: Music from the Motion Picture is 2004 soundtrack album from the epic adventure war film. Composed by James Horner, it was released on May 11, 2004 via Reprise Records.

== Background ==
Composer Gabriel Yared originally worked on the score for Troy for over a year, having been hired by the director, Wolfgang Petersen.

Yared wrote and recorded his score and Tanja Carovska provided vocals on various portions of the music, as she later would on composer James Horner's version of the soundtrack. However, after a screening of the film with an early incomplete version of the score, the reactions at test screenings were against it and in less than a day Yared was off the project without being given a chance to fix or change his music, while Warner Bros was already looking for a replacement. According to Yared, his score was removed due to a complaint by the screening audience that the score was too "old-fashioned".

The replacement score was written by composer James Horner in about four weeks. He used Carovska's vocals again and also included traditional Eastern Mediterranean music and brass instruments. Drums are conspicuous in the most dramatic scenes: most notably, in the duel between Achilles and Hector. Horner also collaborated with American singer/songwriter Josh Groban and lyricist Cynthia Weil to write an original song for the film's end credits. The product of this collaboration, "Remember" was performed by Groban with additional vocals by Tanja Carovska. The song is available on the film's original soundtrack. There is a slight difference between the version of the song available on CD soundtrack and the one playing in the end credits. The score features wailing vocals, which was popularized in Gladiator (2000) by composer Hans Zimmer.

== Track listing ==
| No. | Title | Performer(s) | Length |
|---|---|---|---|
| 1. | "3200 Years Ago" | James Horner | 3:38 |
| 2. | "Troy" | James Horner | 5:01 |
| 3. | "Achilles Leads the Myrmidons" | James Horner | 8:30 |
| 4. | "The Temple of Poseidon" | James Horner | 3:28 |
| 5. | "The Night Before" | James Horner | 3:29 |
| 6. | "The Greek Army and Its Defeat" | James Horner | 9:38 |
| 7. | "Briseis and Achilles" | James Horner | 5:19 |
| 8. | "The Trojans Attack" | James Horner | 5:01 |
| 9. | "Hector's Death" | James Horner | 3:27 |
| 10. | "The Wooden Horse and the Sacking of Troy" | James Horner | 10:02 |
| 11. | "Through the Fires, Achilles... and Immortality" | James Horner | 13:27 |
| 12. | "Remember" | Josh Groban, Tanja Tzarovska | 4:18 |
| Total length: | | | 163:46 |

== Reception ==
The music critic Alex Ross claims that large portions of the score were essentially plagiarized from works by Shostakovich (Symphony No. 5 Fourth Movement), Prokofiev and Rachmaninoff (Symphony No. 1 First Movement); one instance cited by Ross, fanfares from the "Sanctus" of Benjamin Britten's War Requiem, has been explicitly recognised by another critic as an "exact copy" by Horner.

Film score critic Christian Clemmensen of Filmtracks.com felt that Yared's work for Troy was far superior to what Horner had written, giving Horner's score a 3-star rating and Yared's a 5-star rating, saying that it was "outstanding," and called it the "pinnacle of Yared's career."
