= Aleksandra Boikova =

Russian pair skater

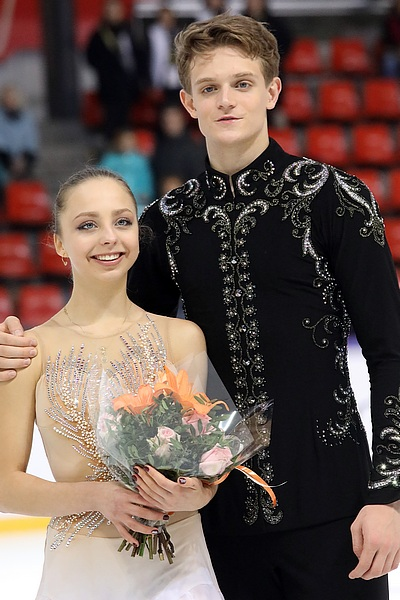
- Boikova and Kozlovskii at the 2018 Internationaux de France

Personal information
- Native name: Александра Игоревна Бойкова
- Full name: Aleksandra Igorevna Boikova
- Born: 20 January 2002 (age 24) Saint Petersburg, Russia
- Height: 1.64 m (5 ft 5 in)

Figure skating career
- Country: (Individual Neutral Athletes) Individual Neutral Athlete; Russia
- Partner: Dmitrii Kozlovskii
- Coach: Stanislav Morozov; Eteri Tutberidze
- Skating club: Center of FC Eteri Tutberidze
- Began skating: 2006
Medal record
Figure skating: Pairs
Representing FSR
World Figure Championships
Bronze medal – third place	2021 Stockholm	Pairs
Representing Russia
European Championships
Gold medal – first place	2020 Graz	Pairs
Bronze medal – third place	2019 Minsk	Pairs
Bronze medal – third place	2022 Tallinn	Pairs
Russian Championships
Gold medal – first place	2020 Krasnoyarsk	Pairs
Gold medal – first place	2023 Krasnoyarsk	Pairs
Gold medal – first place	2026 Saint Petersburg	Pairs
Silver medal – second place	2021 Chelyabinsk	Pairs
Silver medal – second place	2022 Saint Petersburg	Pairs
Silver medal – second place	2024 Chelyabinsk	Pairs
Silver medal – second place	2025 Omsk	Pairs
Bronze medal – third place	2019 Saransk	Pairs
World Junior Championships
Silver medal – second place	2017 Taipei	Pairs
Junior Grand Prix Final
Bronze medal – third place	2016–17 Marseille	Pairs

Aleksandra Igorevna Boikova (Russian: Александра Игоревна Бойкова; born 20 January 2002) is a Russian pair skater who currently competes as an Individual Neutral Athlete. With her skating partner, Dmitrii Kozlovskii, she is the 2020 European champion, the 2021 World bronze medalist, the 2019 European bronze medalist, a seven-time Grand Prix medalist (including four golds), a three-time Russian champion (2020, 2023, 2026), and a six-time Russian national medalist.

On the junior level with Kozlovskii, she is the 2017 Junior World silver medalist, the 2016–17 Junior Grand Prix Final bronze medalist, and the 2017 Russian junior national champion.

== Career ==
=== Early years ===
Boikova started learning to skate in 2006. She trained as a single skater in Alexei Mishin's group until late 2015.

In November 2015, Boikova teamed up with her first pair skating partner, Dmitrii Kozlovskii, who had switched to the discipline four months earlier. Artur Minchuk in Saint Petersburg became the pair's coach.

=== 2016–2017 season: Silver at Junior Worlds ===
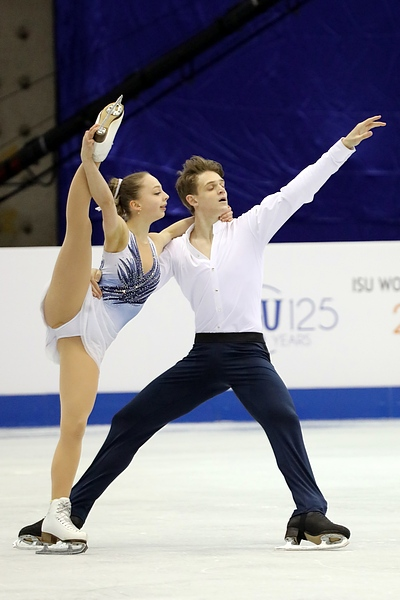
Boikova/Kozlovskii at the 2017 Junior World Championships

Boikova/Kozlovskii's international debut came in September 2016 at a Junior Grand Prix (JGP) event in Russia, where they won the silver medal. They placed fourth in their next JGP assignment in Germany. These results qualified them to the 2016–17 Junior Grand Prix Final, held in December in Marseille, France. They won the bronze medal with a personal best score of 159.72. Later in the same month, they finished sixth competing on the senior level at the Russian Championships. They won the junior national title in February 2017.

In March, Boikova/Kozlovskii won silver at the 2017 World Junior Championships in Taipei, Taiwan. Ranked first in the short program and fourth in the free skate, they finished second to Australia's Ekaterina Alexandrovskaya / Harley Windsor with a deficit of 2.05 points.

=== 2017–2018 season ===
Boikova/Kozlovskii won two medals on the 2017 JGP series. First they won a silver in Riga, Latvia and then a bronze in Zagreb, Croatia. With these results, they qualified to the JGP Final, where they placed fifth.

In October 2017, Boikova/Kozlovskii competed at their first international senior event, the 2017 CS Minsk-Arena Ice Star, where they won the gold medal with their personal best score of 191.58 points. A month later, they skated their second Challenger event at the 2017 CS Warsaw Cup, where they won the silver medal.

At the 2018 Russian Championships, they placed fifth on the senior level and fourth at the junior event.

=== 2018–2019 season: Bronze at Europeans ===
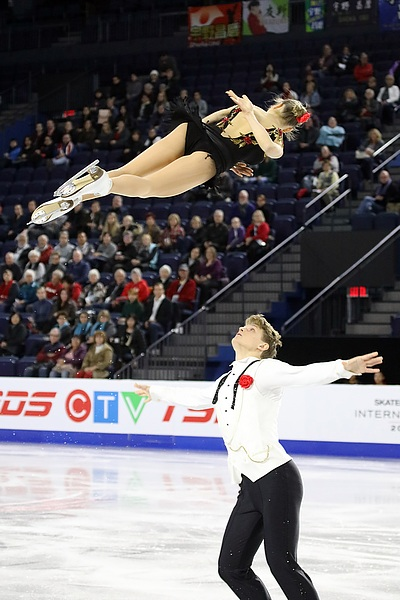
Boikova/Kozlovskii at the 2018 Skate Canada International

Boikova/Kozlovskii started their season by winning two medals on the 2018–2019 ISU Challenger Series. First, they won the silver medal at the 2018 CS Lombardia Trophy and then the bronze medal at the 2018 CS Finlandia Trophy. In late October, Boikova/Kozlovskii made their Grand Prix debut at 2018 Skate Canada, where they placed fourth with a personal best score of 196.54 points. In late November, they competed at the 2018 Internationaux de France, where they won the bronze medal.

At the 2019 Russian Championships, the pair won the bronze medal after placing third in both programs. Boikova's skating boots had broken down following the French Grand Prix, requiring her to break in new boots in short order.

Assigned to the 2019 European Championships, Boikova/Kozlovskii placed fourth in the short program, 0.12 points behind Nicole Della Monica / Matteo Guarise of Italy. They earned their first score above seventy points. In the free skate, Kozlovskii erred on their three-jump combination, but they otherwise skated cleanly, placing third in the free skate and winning the bronze medal overall with a score 0.14 points ahead of Della Monica/Guarise. Kozlovskii referred to the result as "a miracle. Fate has forgiven me today. It gave me a scare, and then it has saved me." Boikova said the two aimed to support each other whenever they made mistakes.

Boikova/Kozlovskii concluded the season at the 2019 World Championships, placing sixth in the short program after losing levels on their death spiral and step sequence. They skated cleanly in the free program, placing sixth there and sixth overall. Boikova remarked, "We did our best, and now we can relax and go to Disneyland tomorrow."

=== 2019–2020 season: European and national titles ===
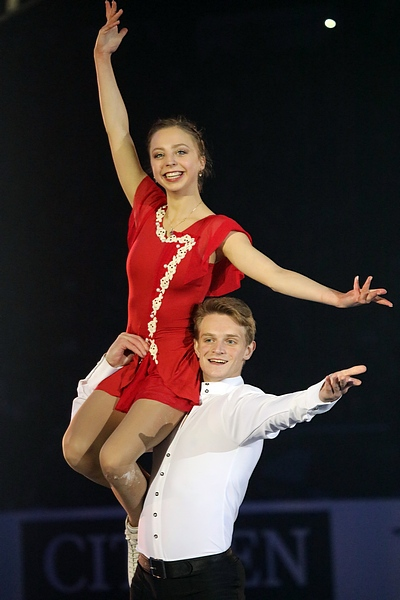
Boikova/Kozlovskii at the 2019 Skate Canada International gala.

After winning the silver medal at the 2019 Shanghai Trophy, Boikova/Kozlovskii began the Grand Prix at 2019 Skate Canada International. They set a new personal best in the short program, narrowly taking the lead over Canadian national champions Moore-Towers/Marinaro and Russian national champions Tarasova/Morozov. They won the free skate by a wider margin for their first Grand Prix gold medal. Competing next at the 2019 Rostelecom Cup, they won the short program with a score of 80.14, only the second team to score above eighty points at that point in the season. They won the free skate with another new personal best, beating Tarasova/Morozov for the second time that season.

Boikova/Kozlovskii's results qualified them to the Grand Prix Final in Turin, where they placed second in the short program behind reigning World Champions Sui/Han. The free skate was less successful, marked by errors on jump and throw elements as well as their final lift, resulting in them placing fifth in that segment and dropping to fourth overall. Kozlovskii remarked, "We are not happy about the skate, but what can I do? It's the sport. It happens, and we will work hard to make sure it doesn't happen again."

Competing at the 2020 Russian Championships, Boikova/Kozlovskii placed second in the short program, three points behind Tarasova/Morozov, who also skated a clean program. Boikova/Kozlovskii then won the free skate, winning their first Russian national title by 0.47 points, an occasion he called "something special and memorable."

In what would prove to be their final competition of the season, Boikova/Kozlovskii entered the 2020 European Championships as the title favourites and won the short program with a new world record score. Winning the free program by a wide margin, they took the gold medal. Despite this success, both described it as "one of the hardest free skatings we've done recently." They had been assigned to compete at the World Championships in Montreal, but those were cancelled as a result of the coronavirus pandemic.

=== 2020–2021 season: World bronze ===
Boikova/Kozlovskii debuted their programs at the senior Russian test skates, saying they had missed performing for spectators. They were scheduled to compete in the third stage of the domestic Russian Cup but had to withdraw after Kozlovskii contracted COVID-19. Following Kozlovskii's recovery, they competed at the fourth stage, where several throw errors caused them to finish behind new training mates Mishina/Galliamov and longtime domestic rivals Tarasova/Morozov. The competition occurred shortly after the death of Igor Moskvin, the husband of their primary coach Tamara Moskvina.

Shortly afterward, they competed on the Grand Prix at the 2020 Rostelecom Cup, attended mainly by Russian-based skaters to minimize pandemic travel. They were second in the short program behind Mishina/Galliamov after making another throw error. They skated a clean free program to take their second consecutive gold medal at Rostelecom. They subsequently withdrew from the fifth stage of the Russian Cup after Boikova came down with a cold.

At the 2021 Russian Championships, Boikova/Kozlovskii attempted to mount a title defense despite only having a week to prepare but encountered throw jump issues in both segments. They placed second in the short program, behind a clean Tarasova/Morozov, after Boikova stepped out of their throw triple Lutz. In the free skate, Boikova stepped out of the throw triple flip. Second in that segment as well, they won the silver medal behind Tarasova/Morozov.

Following the national championships, Boikova/Kozlovskii participated in the 2021 Channel One Trophy, a televised event organized and held in lieu of the cancelled European Championships. They were selected for the Time of Firsts team captained by Evgenia Medvedeva. They placed third in both segments of the competition, and the Time of Firsts team finished in second place. Boikova/Kozlovskii did not participate in the Russian Cup Final.

Heading into the 2021 World Championships in Stockholm, Boikova/Kozlovskii were considered one of the favourites to win the pairs title. For the event, they prepared a new short program to music from the film Howl's Moving Castle, which Boikova called "a piece of art and not just a movie." Skating cleanly, they placed first in the short program, winning a gold small medal. In the free skate, Boikova fell on her attempted triple toe loop and their throw triple flip, and the pair placed fourth in that segment and dropped to the bronze medal position overall.

=== 2021–2022 season: Beijing Olympics ===
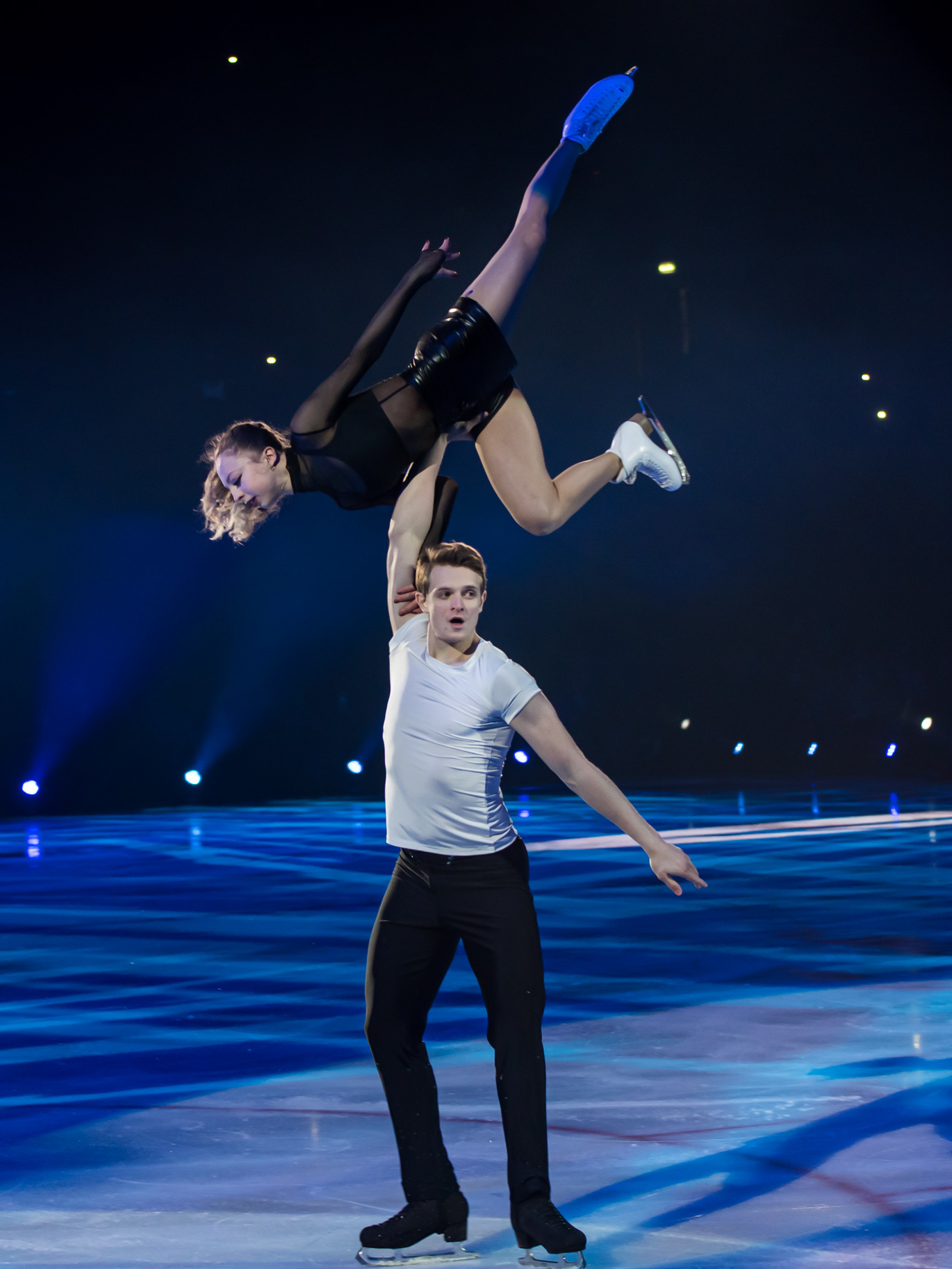
Boikova/Kozlovskii at the 2022 Union of Champions ice show

Boikova/Kozlovskii made their seasonal Grand Prix debut at the 2021 Skate America, where they were second in the short program behind Tarasova/Morozov. Boikova fell twice in the free skate, as a result of which they placed fourth in that segment and fell to the bronze medal position overall, finishing behind Tarasova/Morozov and Japan's Miura/Kihara. Kozlovskii assessed afterward that "not everything worked out, but it was a huge experience for us." They went on to win their second event, the 2021 Internationaux de France, aided by the withdrawal of second seeds Peng/Yang. Kozlovskii said they had "fulfilled our minimum task" by qualifying for the Grand Prix Final, despite errors in the free skate. The Final was subsequently cancelled due to restrictions prompted by the Omicron variant.

At the 2022 Russian Championships, Boikova/Kozlovskii placed second in both segments of the competition to take their second consecutive silver medal, 3.87 points behind rivals Mishina/Galliamov. Kozlovskii called it "a personal victory for us after some difficulties."

Boikova/Kozlovskii placed third in the short program at the 2022 European Championships in Tallinn after Boikova doubled on her planned triple jump. Skating cleanly in the free, they were also third in that segment, taking the bronze medal. Alluding to the short program error, Boikova suggested, "sometimes accidents happen for the better. Maybe, on the contrary, this mistake helped us to concentrate more on today's work." On January 20, they were officially named to the Russian Olympic team.

Competing at the 2022 Winter Olympics in the pairs event, Boikova/Kozlovskii placed fourth in the short program after Boikova had to put a hand down on the landing of their throw flip. In the free skate, Boikova underrotated a triple toe jump and stepped out of a throw triple loop, with the team remaining in fourth place overall. Both expressed disappointment with their results.

In early March 2022, the ISU banned all figure skaters and officials from Russia and Belarus from attending the World Championships and all international competitions due to the Russian invasion of Ukraine in late February.

=== 2022–2023 season ===
Continuing to compete domestically, Boikova/Kozlovskii won both of their Russian Cup assignments; an all Russian Grand Prix series. They subsequently won 2023 Russian Championships and Russian Cup Final, making them undefeated domestically the entire season.

=== 2023–2024 season ===
The pair opened their season by winning both of their Russian Cup assignments. They later placed second at the 2024 Russian Championships, as well as the Russian Cup Final.

Boikova/Kozlovskii winning silver at the 2025 Russian Championships

=== 2024–2025 season: Olympic alternates ===
Boikova/Kozlovskii won gold and silver respectively at their Russian Cup assignments, later placing second and the 2025 Russian Championships. They closed their season with a bronze medal at the Russian Cup Final.

Nearing the end of the season, the Figure Skating Federation of Russia and the Skating Union of Belarus were each permitted to nominate one skater or team from each discipline to participate at the Skate to Milano event as a means to qualify for the 2026 Winter Olympics as Individual Neutral Athletes (AINs). Each nominee was required to pass a special screening process to assess whether they had displayed any active support for the Russian invasion of Ukraine or any contractual links to the Russian or Belarusian military or other national security agencies. Boikova/Kozlovskii were named as the first alternates behind Anastasia Mishina/Aleksandr Galliamov. The ISU shared that if the named team were to fail the screening test, the alternates applications would not be considered. It was later announced that Mishina/Galliamov had failed to pass the screening test, hence Boikova/Kozlovskii's application was not reviewed, leaving them unable to qualify for the 2026 Winter Olympics.

=== 2025–2026 season ===
The pair began their season winning both of their Russian Cup assignments. They later won the 2026 Russian Championships, narrowly taking the lead over Mishina/Galliamov by one point. They later won the Russian Cup Final; mirroring the 2022–23 season, they went undefeated domestically the entire season.

=== 2026–2027 season ===
On 30 June 2026, the International Skating Union announced that figure skaters from Russia and Belarus would be allowed to compete at international competitions as Individual Neutral Athletes (AINs). Each of these skaters are be required to undergo an individual assessment conducted by the ISU Council to determine whether they meet the criteria for neutral status. The pair's application was approved, making them eligible to compete internationally as a neutral athletes.

Boikova/Kozlovskii made their return to the international stage at the 2026 Kinoshita Group Cup where they won the gold medal overall. In their free skate, the pair landed their first internationally ratified quadruple throw jump. The following week, they won the John Nicks Pairs Challenge. Due to their results, the pair was added to the Grand Prix alternate list. They were subsequently assigned to the 2026 Finlandia Trophy and Grand Prix de France.

Boikova/Kozlovskii placed second at 2026 Grand Prix de France. “It’s a good result,” said Kozlovskii of winning silver at their first Grand Prix since 2021. “Returning to the international stage is a big moment for us, but we have to keep working, keep moving forward and see where it takes us.”

On the November 17, the Figure Skating Federation of Russia announced that Russian citizens were denied entry into Finland, due to Finland's Ministry of Foreign Affairs imposing the restriction of Russian nationals into their country, despite having visas. "Finland has tightened restrictions on the entry of Russian citizens into the country. According to the information we received from the Finnish authorities, Russian athletes, including those in neutral status, do not meet the conditions for entry into Finland. This also applies to Russian athletes going on a Schengen visa to participate in the Finlandia Trophy tournament". Boikova/Kozlovskii attempted to enter the country prior to the event and were denied entry, making them unable to compete at the 2026 Finlandia Trophy.

== Programs ==
=== (with Kozlovskii) ===
Season	Short program	Free skating	Exhibition
2026–2027	(Black Panther: Wakanda Forever soundtrack): We Know What You Whisper (feat Busiswa); Yibambe!; They Want it, But No by Tobe Nwigwe, Fat Nwigwe, Ludwig Göransson, Ngawang Samphle, Dorothy Chan, Kyle Miller, Ismael Garza	(Carmen P.S.): Prologue; Carmen is Here; Fatality by Ryan Otter; Habanera by Joseph William Morga	Naughty Girl by Beyoncé; Batdance by Prince; Purple Rain by Prince and The Revolution
2025–2026	Kill Bill; Bang Bang by Sonny Bono performed by Power-Haus and Lloren; Battle Without Honor or Humanity by Tomoyasu Hotei choreo. by Daniil Gleikhengauz	Moonlight Sonata by Samuel Kim choreo. by Albena Denkova, Maxim Staviski	Февраль by Leonid Agutin and Anzhelika Varum
2024–2025	Kill Bill; Bang Bang by Sonny Bono performed by Power-Haus and Lloren; Battle Without Honor or Humanity by Tomoyasu Hotei choreo. by Daniil Gleikhengauz	The Night Country (from True Detective: Night Country) by Vince Pope and Tanya Tagaq; Freya by Power-Haus, Christian Reindl, and Lucie Paradis choreo. by Daniil Gleikhengauz	Drive/Driven; The Race (Club Mix) by Yello
2023–2024	La boheme (Stelios Remix) by Charles Aznavour choreo. by Nikolai Moroshkin, Valeria Chistyakova	The Four Seasons by Antonio Vivaldi arranged by Max Richter choreo. by Anjelika Krylova, Nikolai Moroshkin	
2022–2023	Hit the Road Jack by Percy Mayfield performed by 2WEI choreo. by Nikolai Moroshkin, Valeria Chistyakova	Overture; Time For Bed; Dance With Me; Too Late; Anna's Last Train (from Anna Karenina) by Dario Marianelli choreo. by Nikolai Moroshkin, Valeria Chistyakova	Merry Go Round of Life (from Howl's Moving Castle) by Joe Hisaishi choreo. by Nikolai Morozov, Alexander Zhulin
2021–2022	Swan Lake by Pyotr Ilyich Tchaikovsky choreo. by Nikolai Morozov, Dmitrii Pimonov	Malagueña by Ernesto Lecuona choreo. by Nikolai Morozov, Dmitrii Pimonov	No Time to Die (from No Time to Die) by Billie Eilish choreo. by Nikolay Moroshkin
2020–2021	Merry Go Round of Life (from Howl's Moving Castle) by Joe Hisaishi choreo. by Nikolai Morozov, Alexander Zhulin; The Star of Captivating Happiness by Isaac Schwartz choreo. by Alexander Zhulin	Writing's on the Wall (from Spectre) by Sam Smith performed by Sofia Karlberg choreo. by Nikolai Morozov	My Way performed by André Rieu choreo. by Natalia Bestemianova, Igor Bobrin; Passionata by Andreas Vollenweider
2019–2020	My Way by Frank Sinatra performed by André Rieu choreo. by Natalia Bestemianova, Igor Bobrin	Writing's on the Wall (from Spectre) by Sam Smith performed by Sofia Karlberg choreo. by Nikolai Morozov	
2018–2019	Dark Eyes performed by Igor Bourco's Uralski Jazzmen choreo. by Natalia Bestemianova, Igor Bobrin	The Nutcracker by Pyotr Tchaikovsky choreo. by Peter Tchernyshev	Passionata by Andreas Vollenweider
2017–2018	Sochi Sarabanda by Alexander Goldstein choreo. by Natalia Bestemianova, Igor Bobrin	The Nutcracker by Pyotr Tchaikovsky choreo. by Peter Tchernyshev	Passionata by Andreas Vollenweider
2016–2017	Flamenco by Didula choreo. by Artur Minchuk, Tatiana Druchinina	Tristan and Iseult by Maxime Rodriguez choreo. by Edvald Smirnov	
2015–2016	Flamenco by Didula choreo. by Artur Minchuk, Tatiana Druchinina	Schindler's List by John Williams choreo. by Artur Minchuk, Tatiana Druchinina	

== Competitive highlights ==
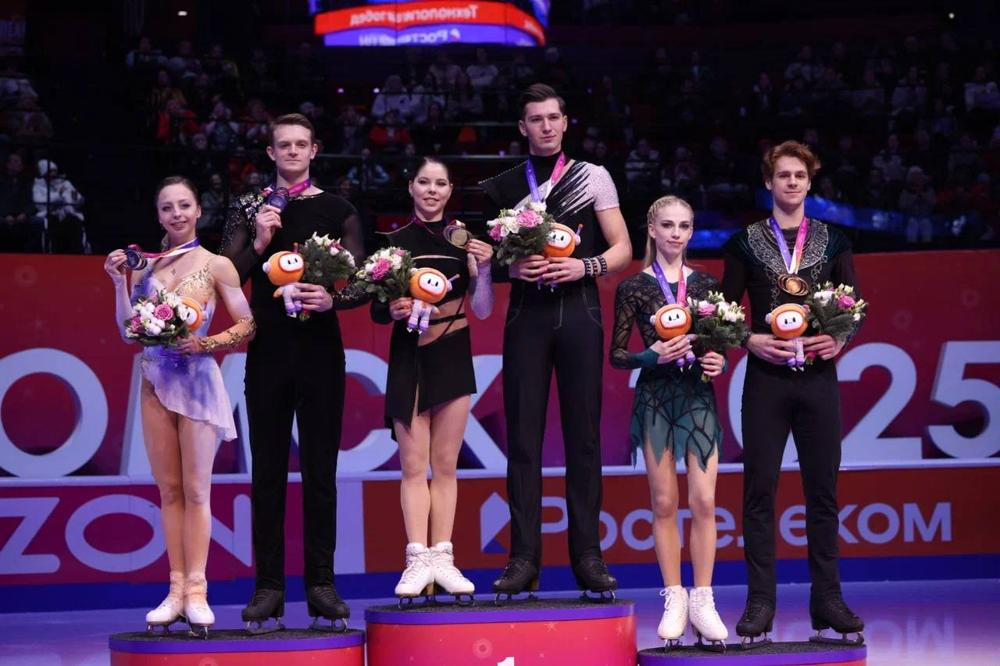
Boikova/Kozlovskii winning the silver medal the 2025 Russian Championships

GP: Grand Prix; CS: Challenger Series; JGP: Junior Grand Prix

=== Skating as an Individual Neutral Athlete ===
Competition placements at senior level
Season	2026–27
GP France	2nd
CS Kinoshita Group Cup	1st
CS John Nicks	1st

=== Skating for Russia ===
With Kozlovskii

International
Event	16–17	17–18	18–19	19–20	20–21	21–22	22–23	23–24	24–25	25–26
Olympics						4th				
World Championships			6th	C	3rd					
European Championships			3rd	1st		3rd				
GP Final				4th		C				
GP France			3rd			1st				
GP Rostelecom				1st	1st					
GP Skate America						3rd				
GP Skate Canada			4th	1st						
CS Finlandia			3rd	WD		WD				
CS Ice Star		1st								
CS Lombardia			2nd							
CS Warsaw Cup		2nd								
Shanghai Trophy				2nd						
International: Junior
Junior Worlds	2nd									
JGP Final	3rd	5th								
JGP Croatia		3rd								
JGP Germany	4th									
JGP Latvia		2nd								
JGP Russia	2nd									
National
Russian Champ.	6th	5th	3rd	1st	2nd	2nd	1st	2nd	2nd	1st
Russian Junior	1st	4th								
Russian Cup Final (Note: The 2023 Russian Cup Final was renamed as the 2023 Russian Grand Prix Final.)							1st	2nd	3rd	
Russian GP Stage 2									1st	1st
Russian GP Stage 3								1st		1st
Russian GP Stage 5									2nd	
Russian GP Stage 6								1st		
Team events
Channel One Trophy					2nd T 3rd P	1st T 2nd P	2nd T 2nd P			
TBD = Assigned; WD = Withdrew; C = Event cancelled

Individual

International: Junior
Event	2013–14
Mini Europa	1st

== Detailed results ==
Small medals for short and free programs awarded only at ISU Championships.

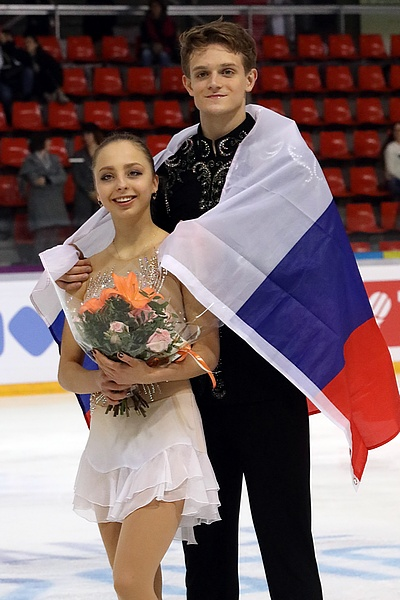
Boikova and Kozlovskii at the 2018 Internationaux de France

With Kozlovskii

ISU personal best scores in the +5/-5 GOE System
Segment	Type	Score	Event
Total	TSS	234.58	2020 European Championships
Short program	TSS	82.34	2020 European Championships
Short program	TES	45.93	2020 European Championships
Short program	PCS	37.21	2020 European Championships
Free skating	TSS	152.24	2020 European Championships
Free skating	TES	78.16	2020 European Championships
Free skating	PCS	74.08	2020 European Championships

ISU personal best scores in the +3/-3 GOE System
Segment	Type	Score	Event
Total	TSS	191.58	2017 CS Minsk-Arena Ice Star
Short program	TSS	64.46	2017 CS Minsk-Arena Ice Star
Short program	TES	35.89	2017 World Junior Championships
Short program	PCS	28.72	2017 CS Minsk-Arena Ice Star
Free skating	TSS	127.12	2017 CS Minsk-Arena Ice Star
Free skating	TES	66.32	2017 CS Warsaw Cup
Free skating	PCS	61.12	2017 CS Minsk-Arena Ice Star

=== Skating as an Individual Neutral Athlete ===
Results in the 2026-27 season
Date	Event	SP		FS		Total	
Date	Event	P	Score	P	Score	P	Score
4-6 Sep, 2026	(Japan) 2026 CS Kinoshita Group Cup	2	72.25	1	131.41	1	203.66
10-12 Sep, 2026	(United States) 2026 CS John Nicks Pairs Challenge	1	70.39	1	128.27	1	198.66
23-25 Oct, 2026	2026 Grand Prix de France	2	75.85	2	121.81	2	197.66

=== Skating for Russia ===
2025–26 season
Date	Event	SP	FS	Total
6-9 March, 2026	2026 Russian Cup Final	2 80.12	1 144.73	1 224.85
17-22 December, 2025	2026 Russian Championships	2 77.42	1 146.87	1; 224.29
7-10 November 2025	2025 Cup of Russia Series, 3rd Stage	2; 73.42	1; 141.92	1; 215.34
1-4 November 2025	2025 Cup of Russia Series, 2nd Stage	1; 78.55	1; 147.63	1; 226.18
2024–25 season
Date	Event	SP	FS	Total
13-17 February 2025	2025 Russian Grand Prix Final	4; 72.63	3; 135.80	3; 208.43
18-23 December 2024	2025 Russian Championships	3; 73.40	2; 142.97	2; 216.37
22-25 November 2024	2024 Cup of Russia Series, 5th Stage	1; 82.71	1; 133.64	2; 216.35
1-4 November 2024	2024 Cup of Russia Series, 2nd Stage	1; 80.92	1; 151.79	1; 232.71
2023–24 season
Date	Event	SP	FS	Total
14–19 February 2024	2024 Russian Grand Prix Final	2; 78.01	2; 152.78	2; 230.79
20–24 December 2023	2024 Russian Championships	2; 78.95	2; 157.37	2; 236.32
24–27 November 2023	2023 Cup of Russia Series, 6th Stage	1; 81.20	1; 154.58	1; 235.78
27–30 October 2023	2023 Cup of Russia Series, 3rd Stage	1; 74.52	1; 146.68	1; 221.20
2022–23 season
Date	Event	SP	FS	Total
3–5 March 2023	2023 Russian Grand Prix Final	1; 81.20	2; 154.58	1; 235.78
21–22 January 2023	2023 Channel One Trophy	2; 81.72	1; 150.68	2T/2P; 232.40
20–26 December 2022	2023 Russian Championships	2; 84.32	1; 150.07	1; 234.39
November 18–21, 2022	2022 Cup of Russia Series, 5th Stage	1; 84.02	1; 155.26	1; 239.28
October 28–30, 2022	2022 Cup of Russia Series, 2nd Stage	1; 83.17	1; 145.19	1; 228.36
2021–22 season
Date	Event	SP	FS	Total
February 18–19, 2022	2022 Winter Olympics	4; 78.59	4; 141.59	4; 220.50
January 10–16, 2022	2022 European Championships	3; 76.26	3; 150.97	3; 227.23
December 21–26, 2021	2022 Russian Championships	2; 82.84	2; 157.03	2; 239.87
November 19–21, 2021	2021 Internationaux de France	1; 77.17	1; 139.79	1; 216.96
October 22–24, 2021	2021 Skate America	2; 75.43	4; 130.10	3; 205.53
2020–21 season
Date	Event	SP	FS	Total
March 22–28, 2021	2021 World Championships	1; 80.16	4; 137.47	3; 217.63
February 5–7, 2021	2021 Channel One Trophy	3; 77.80	3; 151.10	2T/3P; 228.90
December 23–27, 2020	2021 Russian Championships	2; 77.48	2; 147.51	2; 224.99
November 20–22, 2020	2020 Rostelecom Cup	2; 78.29	1; 154.27	1; 232.56
November 8–12, 2020	2020 Cup of Russia Series, 4th Stage, Kazan domestic competition	2; 79.61	3; 140.69	3; 220.30
2019–20 season
Date	Event	SP	FS	Total
January 24–25, 2020	2020 European Championships	1; 82.34	1; 152.24	1; 234.58
December 24–29, 2019	2020 Russian Championships	2; 80.39	1; 153.27	1; 233.66
December 4–8, 2019	2019–20 Grand Prix Final	2; 76.65	5; 125.19	4; 201.84
November 15–17, 2019	2019 Rostelecom Cup	1; 80.14	1; 149.34	1; 229.48
October 25–27, 2019	2019 Skate Canada International	1; 76.45	1; 140.26	1; 216.71
October 3–5, 2019	2019 Shanghai Trophy	2; 76.93	2; 126.23	2; 203.16
2018–19 season
Date	Event	SP	FS	Total
March 18–24, 2019	2019 World Championships	6; 69.99	6; 140.31	6; 210.30
January 21–27, 2019	2019 European Championships	4; 72.58	3; 132.70	3; 205.28
December 19–23, 2018	2019 Russian Championships	3; 74.98	3; 145.42	3; 220.40
November 23–25, 2018	2018 Internationaux de France	1; 68.83	3; 121.01	3; 189.84
October 26–28, 2018	2018 Skate Canada International	4; 64.57	2; 131.97	4; 196.54
October 4–7, 2018	2018 CS Finlandia Trophy	2; 67.81	3; 120.73	3; 188.54
September 12–16, 2018	2018 CS Lombardia Trophy	3; 65.21	1; 126.78	2; 191.99

=== Junior level ===
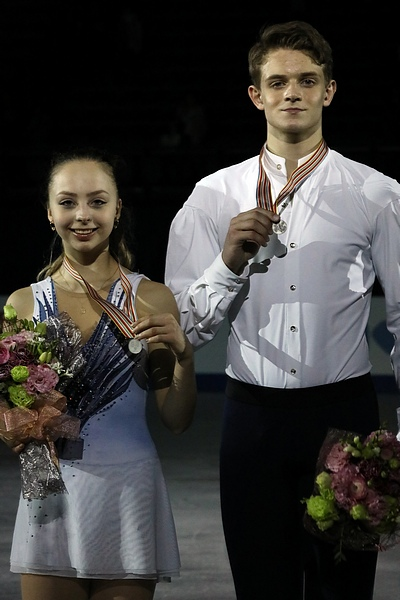
Boikova/Kozlovskii at the 2017 World Junior Championships

2017–18 season
Date	Event	Level	SP	FS	Total
January 23–26, 2018	2018 Russian Junior Championships	Junior	2; 63.19	6; 111.45	4; 174.64
December 21–24, 2017	2018 Russian Championships	Senior	5; 68.20	5; 127.60	5; 195.80
December 7–10, 2017	2017–18 JGP Final	Junior	6; 55.92	5; 104.88	5; 160.80
November 16–19, 2017	2017 CS Warsaw Cup	Senior	4; 58.52	2; 122.32	2; 180.84
October 26–29, 2017	2017 CS Minsk-Arena Ice Star	Senior	1; 64.46	1; 127.12	1; 191.58
September 27–30, 2017	2017 JGP Croatia	Junior	1; 61.23	3; 101.98	3; 163.21
September 6–9, 2017	2017 JGP Latvia	Junior	1; 56.12	4; 97.81	2; 153.93
2016–17 season
Date	Event	Level	SP	FS	Total
March 15–19, 2017	2017 World Junior Championships	Junior	1; 61.27	4; 100.66	2; 161.93
February 1–5, 2017	2017 Russian Junior Championships	Junior	2; 64.95	1; 116.63	1; 181.58
December 20–26, 2016	2017 Russian Championships	Senior	8; 60.77	6; 118.24	6; 179.01
December 8–11, 2016	2016−17 JGP Final	Junior	4; 58.75	3; 100.97	3; 159.72
October 5–9, 2016	2016 JGP Germany	Junior	4; 55.58	3; 96.87	4; 152.45
September 14–18, 2016	2016 JGP Russia	Junior	2; 60.39	3; 92.18	2; 152.57
