= 2026 Grand Prix de France =

Figure skating competition

- Type: Grand Prix
- Date: 23 – 25 October
- Season: 2026–27
- Location: Angers, France
- Host: French Federation of Ice Sports
- Venue: Angers IceParc

Champions
- Men's singles: (France) Adam Siao Him Fa
- Women's singles: (Japan) Ami Nakai
- Pairs: (Georgia (country)) Anastasiia Metelkina and Luka Berulava
- Ice dance: (France) Laurence Fournier Beaudry and Guillaume Cizeron
- Previous: 2025 Grand Prix de France
- Next: 2027 Grand Prix de France
- Next Grand Prix: 2026 Skate Canada International

The 2026 Grand Prix de France was a figure skating competition sanctioned by the International Skating Union (ISU). Organized and hosted by the French Federation of Ice Sports (French: Fédération française des sports de glace), it was the first event of the 2026–27 ISU Grand Prix of Figure Skating: a senior-level international invitational competition series. It was held from 23 to 25 October at the Angers IceParc in Angers. Medals were awarded in men's singles, women's singles, pair skating, and ice dance. Skaters earn points at each Grand Prix event based on their results, and the top skaters or teams in each discipline will be invited to compete at the 2026–27 Grand Prix Final in Chongqing, China. Skaters can earn points towards the World Standings and Season's World Ranking based on their results.

== Background ==
The ISU Grand Prix of Figure Skating is a series of seven events sanctioned by the International Skating Union (ISU) and held during the autumn: six qualifying events and the Grand Prix Final. This allows skaters to perfect their programs earlier in the season, as well as compete against the skaters with whom they will later compete at the World Championships. This series also provides the viewing public with additional televised skating, which was in high demand. Skaters earn points based on their results in their respective competitions and the top skaters or teams in each discipline are invited to compete at the Grand Prix Final. The Grand Prix de France debuted in 1987, and when the ISU launched the Grand Prix series in 1995, the Grand Prix de France was one of the original qualifying events. It has been a Grand Prix event every year since, except for 2020, when it was cancelled due to the COVID-19 pandemic.

The 2026 Grand Prix de France was the first event of the 2026–27 Grand Prix of Figure Skating series, and was held from 23 to 25 October at the Angers IceParc in Angers.

== Entries ==
The International Skating Union announced the preliminary assignments on 16 June 2026.

Country	Men	Women	Pairs	Ice dance
Australia	—N/a			Holly Harris; Jason Chan
Belgium	—N/a	Nina Pinzarrone	—N/a	
Canada	—N/a	Gabrielle Daleman	—N/a	
China	—N/a		Zhang Jiaxuan; Huang Yihang	—N/a
Estonia	Aleksandr Selevko	—N/a		
France	Sammy Hammi	Ève Dubecq	Aurélie Faula; Théo Belle	Louise Bordet; Martin Chardain
France	Adam Siao Him Fa	—N/a	Camille Kovalev; Pavel Kovalev	Laurence Fournier Beaudry; Guillaume Cizeron
France	François Pitot	—N/a	Megan Wessenberg; Denys Strekalin	Célina Fradji; Jean-Hans Fourneaux
Georgia	—N/a	Anastasiia Gubanova	Anastasiia Metelkina; Luka Berulava	Diana Davis; Gleb Smolkin
Germany	—N/a		Annika Hocke; Robert Kunkel	—N/a
Italy	Nikolaj Memola	Lara Naki Gutmann	—N/a	
Italy	—N/a	Sarina Joos	—N/a	
(Individual Neutral Athletes) Individual Neutral Athlete	—N/a		Aleksandra Boikova; Dmitrii Kozlovskii	—N/a
Japan	Kao Miura	Yuna Aoki	—N/a	
Japan	Sōta Yamamoto	Ami Nakai	—N/a	
Japan	—N/a	Rion Sumiyoshi	—N/a	
Kazakhstan	Mikhail Shaidorov	—N/a		
South Korea	Seo Min-kyu	Kim Yu-seong	—N/a	
South Korea	—N/a	Youn Seo-jin	—N/a	
Slovakia	Adam Hagara	—N/a		
Spain	—N/a			Sofía Val; Asaf Kazimov
Ukraine	—N/a		Hannah Herrera; Ivan Khobta	—N/a
United States	Jimmy Ma	Sarah Everhardt	—N/a	Christina Carreira; Anthony Ponomarenko
United States	Jacob Sanchez	—N/a	—N/a	Leah Neset; Artem Markelov
United States	—N/a	—N/a	—N/a	Eva Pate; Logan Bye

== Changes to preliminary assignments ==
Changes to preliminary assignments
Discipline	Withdrew		Added		Notes	Ref.
Discipline	Date	Skater(s)	Date	Skater(s)	Notes	Ref.
Men	—N/a		4 August	(France); François Pitot	Host pick	
Ice dance	8 September	(Lithuania); Allison Reed; Saulius Ambrulevičius	16 September	(Sweden); Milla Ruud Reitan; Nikolaj Majorov	Taking time off	
Ice dance	10 September	(Germany); Jennifer Janse van Rensburg; Benjamin Steffan	22 September	(Australia); Holly Harris; Jason Chan		
Pairs	2 October	(Hungary); Maria Pavlova; Alexei Sviatchenko	5 October	(Individual Neutral Athletes); Aleksandra Boikova; Dmitrii Kozlovskii	Sviatchenko undergone shoulder surgery	

== Required performance elements ==
=== Single skating ===
Lasting no more than 2 minutes 40 seconds, the short program has to include the following elements:

For men: one double or triple Axel; one triple or quadruple jump; one jump combination consisting of a double jump and a triple jump, two triple jumps, or a quadruple jump and a double jump or triple jump; one flying spin; one camel spin or sit spin with a change of foot; one spin combination with a change of foot; and one step sequence using the full ice surface.

For women: one double or triple Axel; one triple jump; one jump combination consisting of a double jump and a triple jump, or two triple jumps; one flying spin; one layback spin, sideways leaning spin, camel spin, or sit spin without a change of foot; one spin combination with a change of foot; and one step sequence using the full ice surface.

The free skate can last no more than 4 minutes, and has to include the following: six jump elements, of which one has to be an Axel-type jump; three spins, of which one has to be a spin combination, one a flying spin, and one a choreographic spin; one step sequence; and a choreographic sequence.

=== Pair skating ===
Lasting no more than 2 minutes 40 seconds, the short program has to include the following elements: one pair lift, one double or triple twist lift, one double or triple throw jump, one double or triple solo jump, one pair spin combination, one death spiral, and one step sequence using the full ice surface.

The free skate could last no more than 4 minutes, and has to include the following: two pair lifts, one twist lift, two different throw jumps, one solo jump, one jump combination or sequence, one choreographic pair spin, and one death spiral.

=== Ice dance ===
Lasting no more than 2 minutes 50 seconds, the theme of the rhythm dance this season is "Rhythm and Waltz". The rhythm dance has to include the following elements: one section of the Golden Waltz pattern dance, one creative dance element, one dance lift, one set of sequential twizzles, and one step sequence while not touching.

The free dance can last no longer than 4 minutes, and has to include the following: three dance lifts or one short lift and one combination lift; one dance spin; one step sequence in hold; one set of synchronized twizzles, one one-foot turns sequence in hold, and two choreographic elements.

== Judging ==
Skaters are judged according to the required technical elements of their program (such as jumps and spins), as well as the overall presentation of their program, based on three program components (skating skills, presentation, and composition). Each technical element in a figure skating performance is assigned a predetermined base point value and scored by a panel of nine judges on a scale from −5 to +5 based on the quality of its execution. Each Grade of Execution (GOE) from –5 to +5 is assigned a value as indicated on the Scale of Values. For example, a triple Axel is worth a base value of 8.00 points, and a GOE of +3 is worth 2.40 points, so a triple Axel with a GOE of +3 earns 10.40 points. The judging panel's GOE for each element is determined by calculating the trimmed mean (the average after discarding the highest and lowest scores). The panel's scores for all elements are added together to generate a Total Elements Score. At the same time, the judges evaluate each performance based on the five aforementioned program components and assign each a score from 0.25 to 10 in 0.25-point increments. The judging panel's final score for each program component is also determined by calculating the trimmed mean. Those scores are then multiplied by the factor shown on the chart below; the results are added together to generate a total Program Component Score.

Program component factoring
Discipline	Short program or rhythm dance	Free skate or free dance
Men	1.67	3.33
Women	1.33	2.67
Pairs	1.33	2.67
Ice dance	1.33	2.00

Deductions are applied for certain violations, such as time infractions, stops and restarts, or falls. The Total Elements Score and Program Component Score are then added together, minus any deductions, to generate a final performance score for each skater or team.

== Medalists ==
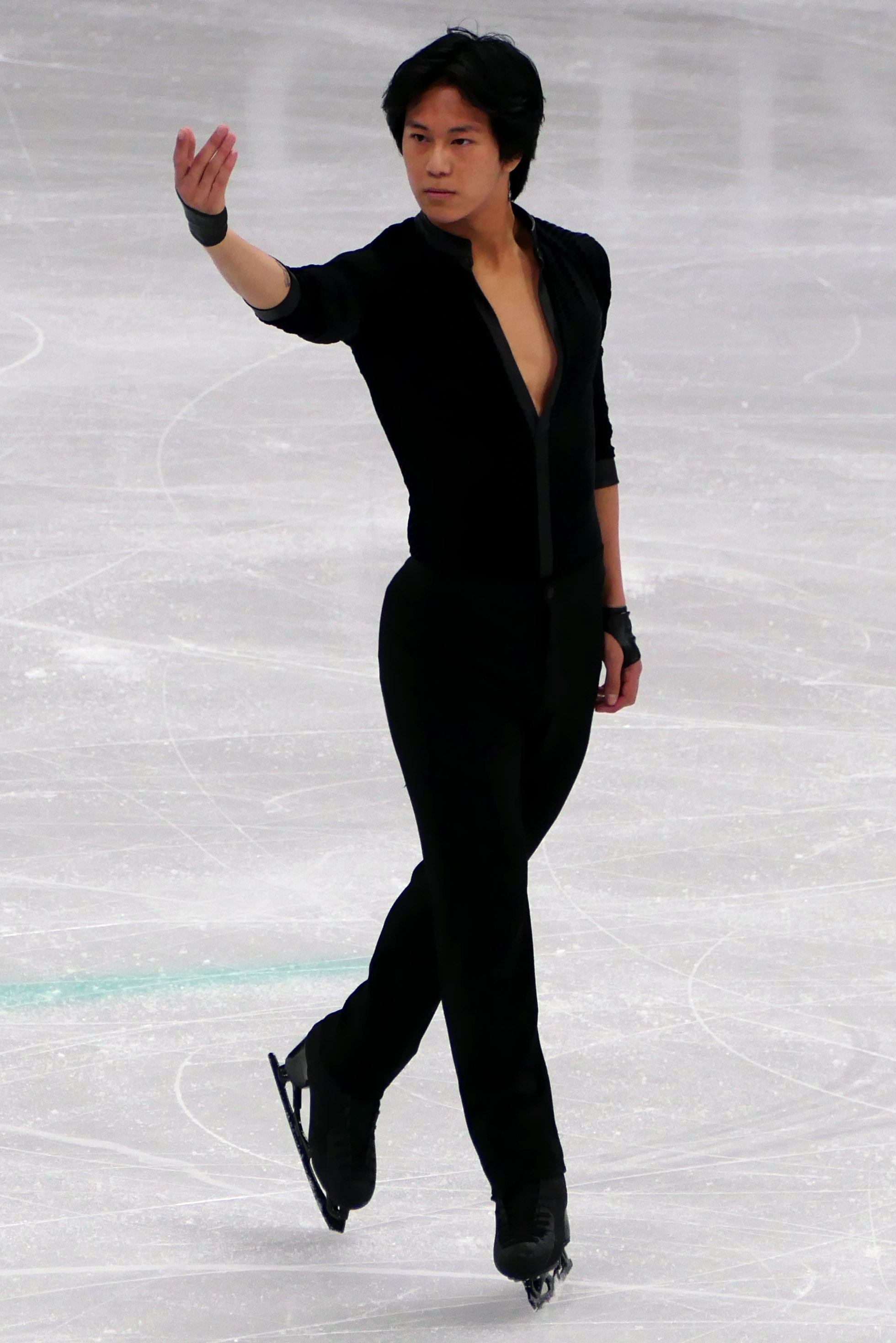
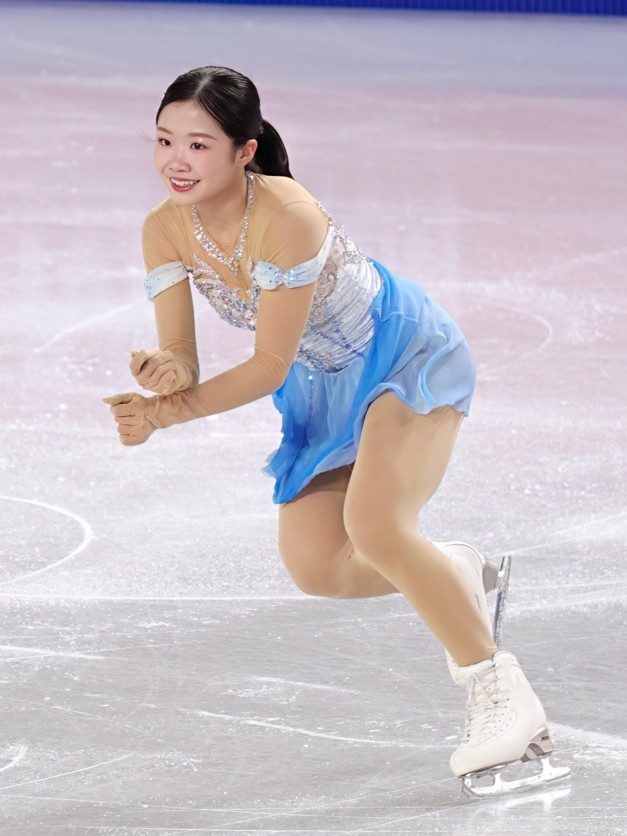
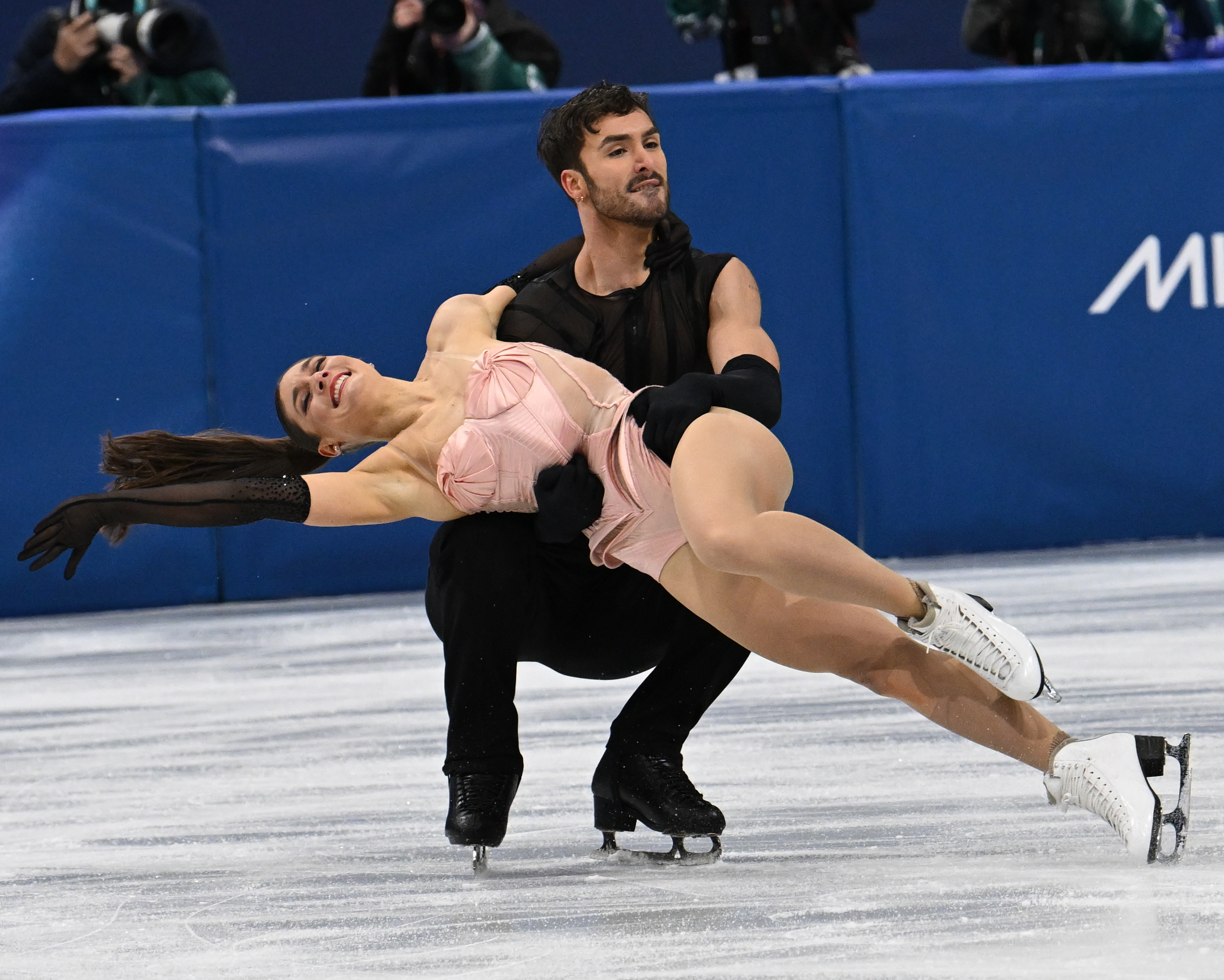
The 2026 Grand Prix de France champions (from left to right): Adam Siao Him Fa of France (men's singles); Ami Nakai of Japan (women's singles); Anastasiia Metelkina and Luka Berulava of Georgia (pair skating); and Laurence Fournier Beaudry and Guillaume Cizeron of France (ice dance)

Medalists
Discipline	Gold	Silver	Bronze
Men	(France); Adam Siao Him Fa	(Japan); Kao Miura	(South Korea); Seo Min-kyu
Women	(Japan) Ami Nakai	(Georgia (country)) Anastasiia Gubanova	(Italy) Lara Naki Gutmann
Pairs	(Georgia (country)); Anastasiia Metelkina; Luka Berulava	(Individual Neutral Athletes); Aleksandra Boikova; Dmitrii Kozlovskii	(Germany); Annika Hocke; Robert Kunkel
Ice dance	(France); Laurence Fournier Beaudry; Guillaume Cizeron	(Georgia (country)); Diana Davis; Gleb Smolkin	(United States); Christina Carreira; Anthony Ponomarenko

== Results ==
=== Men’s Singles ===
Men’s results
Rank	Skater	Nation	Total points	SP		FS	
1st place, gold medalist(s)	Adam Siao Him Fa	France	284.24	1	102.46	1	181.78
2nd place, silver medalist(s)	Kao Miura	Japan	247.96	9	72.67	2	175.29
3rd place, bronze medalist(s)	Seo Min-kyu	South Korea	244.90	3	83.83	3	161.07
4	Aleksandr Selevko	Estonia	229.98	2	85.49	5	144.49
5	Sōta Yamamoto	Japan	224.24	8	77.02	4	147.22
6	Jimmy Ma	United States	221.44	7	77.11	6	144.33
7	François Pitot	France	221.23	6	79.46	7	141.77
8	Jacob Sanchez	United States	212.60	5	79.63	9	132.97
9	Nikolaj Memola	Italy	210.45	10	69.54	8	140.91
10	Mikhail Shaidorov	Kazakhstan	206.55	4	80.25	11	126.30
11	Samy Hammi	France	195.13	11	65.53	10	129.60
WD	Adam Hagara	Slovakia	Withdrew	12	59.17	Withdrew from competition	

=== Women’s Singles ===
Women's results
Rank	Skater	Nation	Total points	SP		FS	
1st place, gold medalist(s)	Ami Nakai	Japan	219.74	3	70.66	1	149.08
2nd place, silver medalist(s)	Anastasiia Gubanova	Georgia	202.82	2	72.63	3	130.19
3rd place, bronze medalist(s)	Lara Naki Gutmann	Italy	202.37	5	65.36	2	137.01
4	Yuna Aoki	Japan	200.62	1	76.31	5	124.31
5	Kim Yu-seong	South Korea	192.57	4	68.72	7	123.85
6	Rion Sumiyoshi	Japan	190.70	8	61.10	4	129.60
7	Sarah Everhardt	United States	184.62	9	60.73	6	123.89
8	Sarina Joos	Italy	175.76	6	63.67	8	112.09
9	Nina Pinzarrone	Belgium	162.15	7	63.19	10	98.96
10	Gabrielle Daleman	Canada	156.22	11	55.66	9	100.56
11	Ève Dubecq	France	146.63	12	51.74	11	94.89
12	Youn Seo-jin	South Korea	132.56	10	57.50	12	75.06

=== Pairs ===
Pairs results
Rank	Skater	Nation	Total points	RD		FD	
1st place, gold medalist(s)	Anastasiia Metelkina; Luka Berulava	Georgia	204.65	1	77.34	1	127.31
2nd place, silver medalist(s)	Aleksandra Boikova; Dmitrii Kozlovskii	Individual Neutral Athletes	197.66	2	75.85	2	121.81
3rd place, bronze medalist(s)	Annika Hocke; Robert Kunkel	Germany	179.74	3	67.03	3	112.71
4	Megan Wessenberg; Denys Strekalin	France	163.98	6	58.37	4	105.61
5	Camille Kovalev; Pavel Kovalev	France	161.62	4	62.40	7	99.22
6	Aurélie Faula; Théo Belle	France	161.32	5	60.85	5	100.47
7	Zhang Jiaxuan; Huang Yihang	China	153.71	7	54.16	6	99.55
8	Hannah Herrera; Ivan Khobta	Ukraine	141.96	8	53.73	8	88.23

=== Ice Dance ===
Ice dance results
Rank	Skater	Nation	Total points	RD		FD	
1st place, gold medalist(s)	Laurence Fournier Beaudry; Guillaume Cizeron	France	207.57	1	82.56	1	125.01
2nd place, silver medalist(s)	Diana Davis; Gleb Smolkin	Georgia	193.93	2	77.90	2	116.03
3rd place, bronze medalist(s)	Christina Carreira; Anthony Ponomarenko	United States	189.36	3	77.83	3	111.53
4	Sofía Val; Asaf Kazimov	Spain	165.99	5	64.78	4	101.21
5	Leah Neset; Artem Markelov	United States	164.72	6	64.60	5	100.12
6	Eva Pate; Logan Bye	United States	156.07	4	64.80	8	91.27
7	Milla Ruud Reitan; Nikolaj Majorov	Sweden	155.95	8	63.01	6	92.94
8	Holly Harris; Jason Chan	Australia	154.79	7	63.45	7	91.34
9	Célina Fradji; Jean-Hans Fourneaux	France	151.24	9	62.40	9	88.84
10	Louise Bordet; Martin Chardain	France	141.94	10	57.55	10	84.39

== Works cited ==
- "Sports Rules – Single & Pair Skating and Ice Dance" (PDF). International Skating Union. Archived (PDF) from the original on 24 May 2026.
