= François Pitot =

François Pitot may refer to:

- François Pitot (naval officer), naval commander during the French Revolutionary Wars
- François Pitot (figure skater) (born 2005), French figure skater
