= Sofia Karlberg =

Swedish singer and songwriter

- Born: Sofia Amanda Karlberg Zoubir; 6 December 1996 (age 29)
- Origin: Stockholm, Sweden
- Genres: Pop, alt-pop, synth-pop
- Occupation: singer
- Years active: 2011–present
- Members: Islam Puth (Islam Hamdaoui)

Sofia Amanda Karlberg Zoubir (born 6 December 1996) is a Swedish singer-songwriter known for her music covers on YouTube. She gained popularity through her music covers on YouTube, including viral renditions of songs like Beyoncé's.

== Life and career ==
Karlberg was born to a Moroccan mother and a Swedish father. She rose to prominence with her covers of Beyoncé's "Crazy in Love" and The Chainsmokers' "Paris". The former reached number 55 on the UK Official Singles Chart, charted on the Hot 40 UK, and spent several weeks on Spotify's viral chart and on top of the iTunes chart in many countries. She had more than two million subscribers on YouTube in 2020. By 2021, her cover of "Crazy in Love" had more than 114 million views on YouTube and more than 140 million streams on Spotify.

In 2016, Karlberg signed a record deal with Universal Music. She released an EP titled "Spotless Mind" in 2019, which was her first original release. In 2020, she released her second original single, "Glowstick", which Earmilk described as alt-pop, electro pop, and R&B. In early 2021, she released "When The Storm Is Over", which Wonderland said "replaces the anthemic synth-pop beat of her earlier bops with a more downtempo, heavy-hearted sound". By 2021, her original music had been streamed 1.6 billion times.

October 2021's "Do It Again", written by Victoria Voss and produced by Martin Bustgaard, was the first single off Karlberg's sophomore EP. She said "wine in winter" inspired the song. A month later, she released the second single, "Hate My Guts", which she said was an apology to those she shut out. Her sophomore EP, Hold My Love, came out on 12 August 2022 and is described as "a mission of self-discovery", reflecting her move from Sweden to Berlin, Germany.
