= 2024 Russian Figure Skating Championships =

- Type: National championship
- Date: 20–24 December 2023 (S); 5–9 February 2024 (J)
- Season: 2023–24
- Location: Chelyabinsk (S); Saransk (J)
- Host: Figure Skating Federation of Russia
- Venue: Traktor Ice Arena (S); Universal Hall Ogarev Arena (J)

Champions
- Men's singles: Evgeni Semenenko (S); Arseny Fedotov (J)
- Women's singles: Adeliia Petrosian (S); Margarita Bazyliuk (J)
- Pairs: Anastasia Mishina / Aleksandr Galliamov (S); Anastasia Chernyshova / Vladislav Vilchik (J)
- Ice dance: Alexandra Stepanova / Ivan Bukin (S); Ekaterina Rybakova / Ivan Makhnonosov (J)
- Previous: 2023 Russian Championships
- Next: 2025 Russian Championships

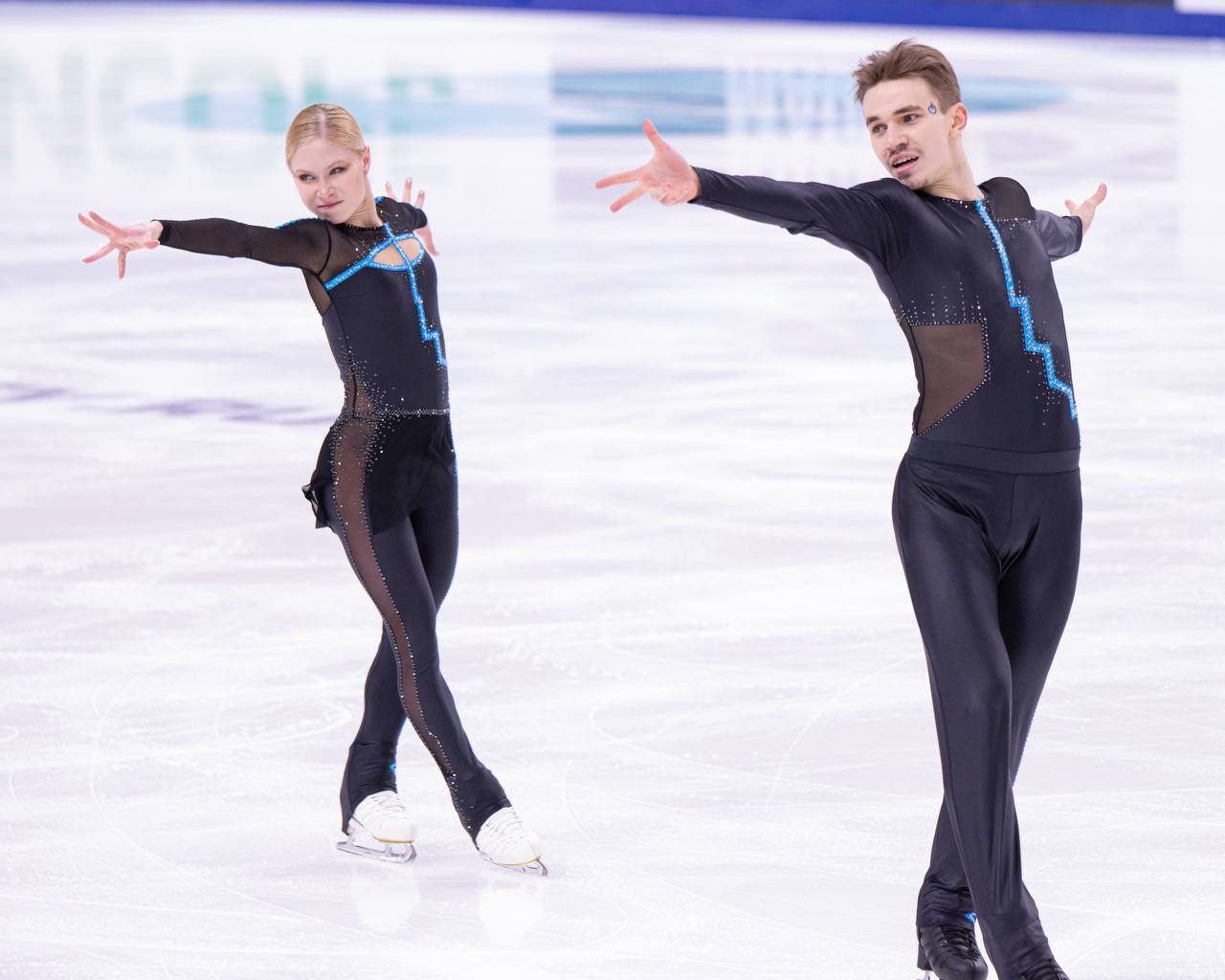
Anastasia Mukhortova and Dmitri Evgeniev in the 2024 Russian Figure Skating Championship

The 2024 Russian Figure Skating Championships (Russian: Чемпионат России по фигурному катанию на коньках 2024) were held from 20 to 24 December 2023 in Chelyabinsk. Medals were awarded in the disciplines of men's singles, women's singles, pairs, and ice dance.

== Qualifying ==
In the 2023–24 season, Russian skaters competed in domestic qualifying events and national championships for various age levels. Russian Grand Prix for senior skaters and the All-Russian competitions for junior skaters, leads to four events – the Russian Championships, the Russian Junior Championships, the Spartakiad of the Top Athletes and the All-Russian final competitions "Federation Cup".

From March 1, 2022, onwards, the International Skating Union banned all figure skaters and officials from Russia and Belarus from attending any international competitions following the 2022 Russian invasion of Ukraine. As a result, all skaters were required to qualify through the Russian Grand Prix and the All-Russian competitions' series.

Date	Event	Type	Location	Details
10–16 October 2023	Russian Grand Prix; Region of Quray	Qualifier	Ufa, Bashkortostan	Details; Details
17–23 October 2023	Russian Grand Prix; Heart of Siberia	Qualifier	Omsk, Omsk Oblast	Details; Details
24–30 October 2023	Russian Grand Prix; Krasnoyarye	Qualifier	Krasnoyarsk, Krasnoyarsk Krai	Details; Details
8–13 November 2023	Russian Grand Prix; Idel–2023	Qualifier	Kazan, Tatarstan	Details; Details
15–20 November 2023	Russian Grand Prix; Volga Pirouette	Qualifier	Samara, Samara Oblast	Details; Details
21–27 November 2023	Russian Grand Prix; Golden Skate of Moscow	Qualifier	Moscow	Details; Details
20–24 December 2023	2024 Russian Championships	Final	Chelyabinsk, Chelyabinsk Oblast	Details
5–9 February 2024	2024 Russian Junior Championships	Final	Saransk, Mordovia	Details
14–18 February 2024	2024 Spartakiad of the Top Athletes	Final	Magnitogorsk, Chelyabinsk Oblast	Details
23–27 February 2024	2024 Russian Youth Championships – Younger Age	Final	Yoshkar-Ola, Mari El	Details
13–16 March 2024	2024 Federation Cup	Final	Sochi, Krasnodar Krai	Details
1–5 April 2024	2024 Russian Youth Championships – Elder Age	Final	Kazan, Tatarstan	Details

== Medalists of most important competitions ==
Senior Championships
Discipline	Gold	Silver	Bronze
Men	Evgeni Semenenko	Vladislav Dikidzhi	Petr Gumennik
Women	Adeliia Petrosian	Sofia Muravieva	Kseniia Sinitsyna
Pairs	Anastasia Mishina / Aleksandr Galliamov	Aleksandra Boikova / Dmitrii Kozlovskii	Ekaterina Chikmareva / Matvei Ianchenkov
Ice dance	Alexandra Stepanova / Ivan Bukin	Elizaveta Khudaiberdieva / Egor Bazin	Irina Khavronina / Devid Naryzhnyy
Junior Championships
Discipline	Gold	Silver	Bronze
Men	Arseny Fedotov	Lev Lazarev	Ivan Ramzenkov
Women	Margarita Bazyliuk	Alisa Dvoeglazova	Lidia Pleskachova
Pairs	Anastasia Chernyshova / Vladislav Vilchik	Vlada Selivanova / Viktor Potapov	Alisa Blinnikova / Aleksei Karpov
Ice dance	Ekaterina Rybakova / Ivan Makhnonosov	Anna Kolomenskaya / Artem Frolov	Anna Shcherbakova / Egor Goncharov
Spartakiad of the Top Athletes and All-Russian final competitions "Federation Cup"
Discipline	Gold	Silver	Bronze
Men	Evgeni Semenenko	Mark Kondratiuk	Vladislav Dikidzhi
Women	Adeliia Petrosian	Anna Frolova	Kseniia Sinitsyna
Pairs	Anastasia Mishina / Aleksandr Galliamov	Aleksandra Boikova / Dmitrii Kozlovskii	Iuliia Artemeva / Aleksei Briukhanov
Ice dance	Alexandra Stepanova / Ivan Bukin	Elizaveta Khudaiberdieva / Egor Bazin	Irina Khavronina / Devid Naryzhnyy
Junior men	Lev Lazarev	Arseny Fedotov	Nikolai Ugozhaev
Junior women	Alisa Dvoeglazova	Margarita Bazyliuk	Sofia Dzepka
Junior pairs	Veronika Merenkova / Danil Galimov	Alisa Blinnikova / Aleksei Karpov	Anastasia Chernyshova / Vladislav Vilchik
Junior ice dance	Anna Shcherbakova / Egor Goncharov	Anna Kolomenskaya / Artem Frolov	Milana Kuzmina / Dmitrii Studenikin
Youth Championships – Elder Age
Discipline	Gold	Silver	Bronze
Men	Roman Khamzin	Vadim Voronov	Ivan Ramzenkov
Women	Elena Kostyleva	Alisa Yurova	Nadezhda Ponteleenko
Pairs	Kira Domozhirova / Ilya Vegera	Sofia Diana Cousins / Aleksandr Bregey	Polina Shesheleva / Egor Karnaukhov
Ice dance	Zoya Pestova / Sergei Lagutov	Polina Zharova / Ranel Ibatullin	Sofia Zagrebaeva / Veniamin Bashurov
Youth Championships – Younger Age
Discipline	Gold	Silver	Bronze
Men	Roman Khamzin	Artem Fedotov	Dobromir Voronov
Women	Elena Kostyleva	Victoria Streltsova	Valeria Lukashova
Pairs	No pairs' discipline		
Ice dance	No ice dance discipline		

== Senior Championships ==
The 2024 Russian Championships were held in Chelyabinsk from 20 to 24 December 2023. Qualification is based on Russian Grand Prix series' results. In addition, figure skaters who were included in official pre-season national team roster but were unable to qualify through the Russian Grand Prix due to good reasons, can be included into list of participants by decision of the executive committee of the Figure Skating Federation of Russia.

=== Schedule ===
Listed in local time (UTC+05:00).

Day	Date	Start	Finish	Discipline	Event
Day 1	21 December	13:00	15:10	Ice dance	Rhythm dance
Day 1	21 December	15:30	18:00	Men	Short program
Day 1	21 December	18:15	18:45		Opening ceremony
Day 1	21 December	19:00	20:55	Pairs	Short program
Day 2	22 December	13:00	15:30	Ice dance	Free dance
Day 2	22 December	15:45	18:40	Men	Free skating
Day 2	22 December	19:00	21:30	Women	Short program
Day 3	23 December	14:30	16:35	Pairs	Free skating
Day 3	23 December	17:00	19:55	Women	Free skating
Day 4	24 December	12:30	13:15		Victory ceremonies
Day 4	24 December	13:30	16:00		Exhibition gala

=== Preliminary entries ===
The Figure Skating Federation of Russia published the official list of participants on 11 December 2023.

Men	Women	Pairs	Ice dance
Vladislav Dikidzhi	Adeliia Petrosian	Anastasia Mishina / Aleksandr Galliamov	Alexandra Stepanova / Ivan Bukin
Evgeni Semenenko	Anna Frolova	Aleksandra Boikova / Dmitrii Kozlovskii	Elizaveta Khudaiberdieva / Egor Bazin
Roman Savosin	Sofia Muravieva	Natalia Khabibullina / Ilya Knyazhuk	Irina Khavronina / Devid Naryzhnyy
Petr Gumennik	Alina Gorbacheva	Elizaveta Osokina / Artem Gritsaenko	Elizaveta Shanaeva / Pavel Drozd
Alexander Samarin	Veronika Yametova	Ekaterina Chikmareva / Matvei Ianchenkov	Sofia Leontieva / Daniil Gorelkin
Mark Kondratiuk	Kamila Valieva	Iuliia Artemeva / Aleksei Briukhanov	Ekaterina Mironova / Evgenii Ustenko
Matvei Vetlugin	Daria Sadkova	Yasmina Kadyrova / Valerii Kolesov	Sofia Shevchenko / Andrei Ezhlov
Andrei Mozalev	Kseniia Sinitsyna	Alena Kostornaia / Georgiy Kunitsa	Daria Savkina / Alexander Vakhnov
Dmitri Aliev	Maria Agaeva	~~Taisiia Sobinina / Denis Khodykin~~ (withdrew)	Varvara Zhdanova / Timur Babaev-Smirnov
Gleb Lutfullin	Elizaveta Kulikova	Anastasia Mukhortova / Dmitry Evgenyev	Sofya Tyutyunina / Matvei Grachyov
Makar Ignatov	Ksenia Gushchina	~~Daria Boyarintseva / Roman Pleshkov~~ (withdrew)	Sofiia Kachushkina / Mark Volkov
Alexey Erokhov	Sofia Zakharova	~~Viktoria Vasilieva / Roman Zaporozhets~~ (withdrew)	Alexandra Prokopets / Alexander Vaskovich
Daniil Samsonov	Lyudmila Fursova		Polina Usova / Mikhail Antonov
Semyon Soloviev	Maya Khromykh		Varvara Kurnosenko / Fedor Varlamov
Fedor Zonov	Sofia Vazhnova		Ksenia Krausova / Daniil Korochkin
Grigory Fedorov	Maria Talalaikina		
Daniil Postarnakov	Ekaterina Anisimova		
~~Andrei Mukhortov~~ (withdrew)	Arina Kshetskaya		
Substitutes
Ilya Yablokov (added)	Polina Sviridenko	Maya Shegay / Igor Shamshurov (added)	Elizaveta Kirillova / Ilya Karpov
Ivan Popov	Angelina Palagina	Karina Akopova / Nikita Rakhmanin	Ekaterina Khrabrykh / Miron Suslov
Danil Fedosimov	Renata Gubasheva	Elizaveta Kuleshova / Vladimir Sled (added, but withdrew)	Alisa Krainyukova / Semyon Netsev

==== Changes to preliminary entries ====
Date	Discipline	Withdrew	Added	Reason/Other notes	Refs
11 December	Men	Andrei Mukhortov	Ilya Yablokov	Decision of the executive committee of the FSR	
11 December	Pairs	Taisiia Sobinina / Denis Khodykin	Maya Shegay / Igor Shamshurov	Family reasons	
11 December	Pairs	Daria Boyarintseva / Roman Pleshkov	Elizaveta Kuleshova / Vladimir Sled	Family reasons	
11 December	Pairs	Viktoria Vasilieva / Roman Zaporozhets	None		
20 December	Pairs	Elizaveta Kuleshova / Vladimir Sled	None		

=== Results ===
==== Men ====
Rank	Name	Total points	SP		FS	
1	Evgeni Semenenko	294.75	2	101.19	2	193.56
2	Vladislav Dikidzhi	293.74	1	102.70	3	191.04
3	Petr Gumennik	292.42	4	91.84	1	200.58
4	Dmitri Aliev	285.57	3	99.20	4	186.37
5	Daniil Samsonov	265.63	8	86.97	5	178.66
6	Makar Ignatov	265.34	5	89.73	6	175.61
7	Roman Savosin	255.48	6	88.19	10	167.29
8	Semyon Soloviev	255.28	7	87.56	8	167.72
9	Ilya Yablokov	249.51	9	83.99	12	165.52
10	Mark Kondratiuk	249.08	11	80.97	7	168.11
11	Andrei Mozalev	248.18	12	80.71	9	167.47
12	Gleb Lutfullin	243.47	14	77.52	11	165.95
13	Grigory Fedorov	237.98	10	81.47	13	156.51
14	Matvei Vetlugin	224.76	15	76.10	15	148.66
15	Alexander Samarin	223.55	16	71.95	14	151.60
16	Fedor Zonov	198.61	17	66.78	16	131.83
17	Daniil Postarnakov	189.50	13	77.54	17	111.96
WD	Alexey Erokhov	withdrew	withdrew from competition			

==== Women ====
- The former bronze medalist Kamila Valieva was disqualified for violation of anti-doping rules.

Rank	Name	Total points	SP		FS	
1	Adeliia Petrosian	246.53	1	79.06	1	167.47
2	Sofia Muravieva	239.40	2	78.33	2	161.07
3	Kseniia Sinitsyna	223.81	3	75.21	4	148.60
4	Anna Frolova	219.47	5	73.52	5	145.95
5	Veronika Yametova	216.01	4	73.86	7	142.15
6	Alina Gorbacheva	214.87	6	72.09	6	142.78
7	Daria Sadkova	214.65	13	64.22	3	150.43
8	Maria Agaeva	203.60	9	68.06	9	135.54
9	Ksenia Gushchina	203.30	11	66.88	8	136.42
10	Sofia Vazhnova	198.02	10	67.13	10	130.89
11	Lyudmila Fursova	193.87	14	63.31	11	130.56
12	Elizaveta Kulikova	186.61	7	68.44	13	118.17
13	Ekaterina Anisimova	183.38	12	66.20	14	117.18
14	Sofia Zakharova	173.06	15	59.81	16	113.25
15	Arina Kshetskaya	172.25	17	54.01	12	118.24
16	Maria Talalaikina	169.80	16	56.29	15	113.51
17	Maya Khromykh	164.30	8	68.40	17	95.90
DSQ *	Kamila Valieva	~~237.99~~	DSQ	~~81.85~~	DSQ	~~156.14~~

==== Pairs ====
Rank	Name	Total points	SP		FS	
1	Anastasia Mishina / Aleksandr Galliamov	244.85	1	83.01	1	161.84
2	Aleksandra Boikova / Dmitrii Kozlovskii	236.32	2	78.95	2	157.37
3	Ekaterina Chikmareva / Matvei Ianchenkov	227.97	3	76.42	3	151.55
4	Natalia Khabibullina / Ilya Knyazhuk	215.69	6	73.82	4	141.87
5	Iuliia Artemeva / Aleksei Briukhanov	212.23	4	75.85	6	136.38
6	Anastasia Mukhortova / Dmitry Evgenyev	205.87	7	72.77	7	133.10
7	Yasmina Kadyrova / Valerii Kolesov	203.23	8	71.47	8	131.76
8	Elizaveta Osokina / Artem Gritsaenko	202.91	5	75.68	9	127.23
9	Alena Kostornaia / Georgiy Kunitsa	200.15	9	63.74	5	136.41
10	Maya Shegay / Igor Shamshurov	169.15	10	62.38	10	106.77

==== Ice dance ====
Rank	Name	Total points	RD		FD	
1	Alexandra Stepanova / Ivan Bukin	217.72	1	86.90	1	130.82
2	Elizaveta Khudaiberdieva / Egor Bazin	204.90	2	83.29	3	121.61
3	Irina Khavronina / Devid Naryzhnyy	198.90	5	75.93	2	122.97
4	Elizaveta Shanaeva / Pavel Drozd	196.26	4	76.79	4	119.47
5	Sofia Leontieva / Daniil Gorelkin	193.87	3	77.45	5	116.42
6	Ekaterina Mironova / Evgenii Ustenko	187.43	6	73.78	6	113.65
7	Sofya Tyutyunina / Matvei Grachyov	183.60	7	72.28	7	111.32
8	Varvara Zhdanova / Timur Babaev-Smirnov	180.92	9	72.13	8	108.79
9	Alexandra Prokopets / Alexander Vaskovich	175.70	12	69.84	9	105.86
10	Sofiia Kachushkina / Mark Volkov	175.50	8	72.21	10	103.29
11	Sofia Shevchenko / Andrei Ezhlov	174.68	11	71.40	11	103.28
12	Daria Savkina / Alexander Vakhnov	169.36	10	71.65	12	97.71
13	Polina Usova / Mikhail Antonov	162.57	14	66.54	13	96.03
14	Varvara Kurnosenko / Fedor Varlamov	161.49	13	67.21	14	94.28
15	Ksenia Krausova / Daniil Korochkin	152.76	15	62.02	15	90.74

== Junior Championships ==
The 2024 Russian Junior Championships (Russian: Первенство России среди юниоров 2024) were held in Saransk, Mordovia from 5 to 9 February 2024. Qualification was based on results of the All-Russian competitions' series (which were held alongside the Russian Grand Prix series among senior skaters). These junior figure skaters who qualified to the Senior Championships through the Russian Grand Prix series can be included into list of participants without additional qualification. In addition, figure skaters who were included in the official pre-season national team roster but were unable to qualify through the All-Russian competitions' series due to good reasons, also can be included into list of participants by decision of the executive committee of the Figure Skating Federation of Russia.

=== Schedule ===
Listed in local time (UTC+03:00).

Day	Date	Start	Finish	Discipline	Event
Day 1	6 February	14:00	16:20	Men	Short program
Day 1	6 February	16:40	17:10		Opening ceremony
Day 1	6 February	17:10	19:30	Women	Short program
Day 1	6 February	19:45	21:50	Ice dance	Rhythm dance
Day 2	7 February	13:15	15:50	Men	Free skating
Day 2	7 February	16:05	16:15		Victory ceremony
Day 2	7 February	16:15	18:50	Women	Free skating
Day 2	7 February	19:05	19:15		Victory ceremony
Day 2	7 February	19:15	21:05	Pairs	Short program
Day 3	8 February	12:00	14:15	Ice dance	Free dance
Day 3	8 February	14:30	14:40		Victory ceremony
Day 3	8 February	14:40	16:30	Pairs	Free skating
Day 3	8 February	16:45	17:00		Victory ceremony

=== Preliminary entries ===
The Figure Skating Federation of Russia published the official list of participants on 31 January 2024.

Men	Women	Pairs	Ice dance
Arseny Fedotov	Margarita Bazyliuk	Anastasia Chernyshova / Vladislav Vilchik	Ekaterina Rybakova / Ivan Makhnonosov
Nikolai Ugozhaev	Alisa Dvoeglazova	Kira Domozhirova / Ilya Vegera	Anna Kolomenskaya / Artem Frolov
Eduard Karartynian	Alena Prineva	Taisiia Shcherbinina / Artem Petrov	Anna Shcherbakova / Egor Goncharov
Ivan Ramzenkov	~~Victoria Morozova~~ (withdrew)	~~Varvara Cheremnykh / Daniil Butenko~~ (withdrew)	Milana Kuzmina / Dmitrii Studenikin
~~Nikita Malyutin~~ (withdrew)	Sofia Dzepka	Anna Moskaleva / Artem Rodzyanov	Elizaveta Maleina / Matvei Samokhin
Lev Lazarev	Agata Petrova	Alisa Blinnikova / Aleksei Karpov	Arina Gorshenina / Ilya Makarov
Kirill Kropylev	Ekaterina Tsipukhina	Maya Shegay / Igor Shamshurov	Vasilisa Grigoreva / Evgeni Artyushchenko
~~Aleksandr Semkov~~ (withdrew)	Nadezhda Ponteleenko	Veronika Merenkova / Danil Galimov	Zoya Pestova / Sergei Lagutov
~~Nikolay Kolesnikov~~ (withdrew)	Varvara Kravchina	Vlada Selivanova / Viktor Potapov	Sofia Zagrebaeva / Veniamin Bashurov
Vadim Voronov	Alisa Yurova	Valeria Khodykina / Aleksei Belkin	Taisiia Linchevskaia / Dmitrii Shcherbakov
Makar Puzin	Milana Lebedeva	~~Anastasia Egorova / Rodion Marinskiy~~ (withdrew)	~~Aleksandra Shinkarenko / Vladislav Mikhailov~~ (withdrew)
Ilya Stroganov	Polina Tikhonova	Viktoria Eltsova / Stepan Marishin	Daria Drozhzhina / Ivan Telnov
Maxim Avtushenko	Maria Mazur		Yulia Churkina / Boris Frolov
Kirill Nozdrevatykh	Kira Trofimova		Maria Sorokina / Arseny Antropov
Mark Lukin	Maria Krasnozhenova		Milana Zhabina / Dmitrii Pekin
~~Glev Kovtun~~ (withdrew)	Riana Kadyrova		
German Lenkov	Lidia Pleskachova		
Mikhail Tikhonov	Elizaveta Labutina		
Substitutes
Timofei Shelkovnikov (added)	Sofya Titova	Varvara Medvedeva / Pavel Astakhov (added)	Kamilla Sharafutdinova / Rodion Murasalimov
Andrei Kotsin (added)	Maria Gordeeva (added)	Sofia Khisamutdinova / Lev Tsekhanovich (added)	Anna Rumak / Gleb Goncharov (added)
Aleksandr Chmil	Eva Zubkova	Maria Simonova / Martin Breslavskiy	Polina Zharova / Ranel Ibatullin
Nikita Sarnovskiy (added)			

==== Changes to preliminary entries ====
Date	Discipline	Withdrew	Added	Reason/Other notes	Refs
30 December; 31 January	Ice dance	Aleksandra Shinkarenko / Vladislav Mikhailov	Anna Rumak / Gleb Goncharov	Split	
31 January	Men	Nikita Malyutin	Timofei Shelkovnikov		
31 January	Men	Aleksandr Semkov	Andrei Kotsin		
31 January	Men	Glev Kovtun	Nikita Sarnovskiy	Decision of the executive committee of the FSR	
31 January	Women	Victoria Morozova	Maria Gordeeva	Injury	
31 January	Pairs	Varvara Cheremnykh / Daniil Butenko	Varvara Medvedeva / Pavel Astakhov		
31 January	Pairs	Anastasia Egorova / Rodion Marinskiy	Sofia Khisamutdinova / Lev Tsekhanovich		
5 February	Men	Nikolay Kolesnikov	None		

=== Results ===
==== Men ====
Rank	Name	Total points	SP		FS	
1	Arseny Fedotov	269.04	1	87.78	1	181.26
2	Lev Lazarev	259.28	5	79.03	2	180.25
3	Ivan Ramzenkov	234.03	6	76.93	3	157.10
4	Mark Lukin	233.96	3	80.49	5	153.47
5	Eduard Karartynian	229.56	4	80.13	10	149.43
6	Mikhail Tikhonov	228.28	11	73.88	4	154.40
7	Makar Puzin	227.31	7	75.73	7	151.58
8	Maxim Avtushenko	225.63	13	72.33	6	153.30
9	Vadim Voronov	225.62	9	74.49	8	151.13
10	Nikolai Ugozhaev	222.60	2	83.83	15	138.77
11	Kirill Kropylev	214.62	10	73.96	11	140.66
12	Andrei Kotsin	214.57	8	75.12	13	139.45
13	Ilya Stroganov	214.04	12	73.49	12	140.55
14	Nikita Sarnovskiy	213.84	16	63.80	9	150.04
15	Timofei Shelkovnikov	209.24	15	70.09	14	139.15
16	German Lenkov	186.68	14	71.63	16	115.05
17	Kirill Nozdrevatykh	161.37	17	53.94	17	107.43

==== Women ====
Rank	Name	Total points	SP		FS	
1	Margarita Bazyliuk	245.19	1	74.30	1	170.89
2	Alisa Dvoeglazova	231.33	2	73.50	2	157.83
3	Lidia Pleskachova	211.83	5	68.47	3	143.36
4	Sofia Dzepka	210.04	3	70.75	5	139.29
5	Ekaterina Tsipukhina	205.39	9	65.59	4	139.80
6	Kira Trofimova	199.22	7	67.48	7	131.74
7	Agata Petrova	199.19	6	67.52	9	131.67
8	Milana Lebedeva	199.10	12	65.09	6	134.01
9	Elizaveta Labutina	197.01	8	67.30	10	129.71
10	Polina Tikhonova	196.03	4	69.15	11	126.88
11	Alena Prineva	193.28	16	61.57	8	131.71
12	Nadezhda Ponteleenko	188.02	13	63.69	13	124.33
13	Maria Mazur	186.34	17	60.28	12	126.06
14	Maria Gordeeva	183.78	10	65.50	17	118.28
15	Alisa Yurova	183.24	15	62.34	14	120.90
16	Varvara Kravchina	182.58	14	62.75	15	119.83
17	Riana Kadyrova	176.71	11	65.19	18	111.52
18	Maria Krasnozhenova	172.43	18	53.00	16	119.43

==== Pairs ====
Rank	Name	Total points	SP		FS	
1	Anastasia Chernyshova / Vladislav Vilchik	194.41	1	69.06	1	125.35
2	Vlada Selivanova / Viktor Potapov	177.28	3	63.09	3	114.19
3	Alisa Blinnikova / Aleksei Karpov	175.46	6	59.72	2	115.74
4	Valeria Khodykina / Aleksei Belkin	169.32	5	59.98	4	109.34
5	Varvara Medvedeva / Pavel Astakhov	168.10	2	66.14	9	101.96
6	Kira Domozhirova / Ilya Vegera	166.43	7	59.13	5	107.30
7	Veronika Merenkova / Danil Galimov	166.21	4	60.63	7	105.58
8	Maya Shegay / Igor Shamshurov	165.83	8	59.08	6	106.75
9	Taisiia Shcherbinina / Artem Petrov	159.43	9	57.26	8	102.17
10	Anna Moskaleva / Artem Rodzyanov	152.13	10	51.85	11	100.28
11	Sofia Khisamutdinova / Lev Tsekhanovich	150.64	12	50.10	10	100.54
12	Viktoria Eltsova / Stepan Marishin	140.65	11	51.17	12	89.48

==== Ice dance ====
Rank	Name	Total points	RD		FD	
1	Ekaterina Rybakova / Ivan Makhnonosov	186.40	1	75.68	1	110.72
2	Anna Kolomenskaya / Artem Frolov	180.70	2	72.06	3	108.64
3	Anna Shcherbakova / Egor Goncharov	180.63	3	71.80	2	108.83
4	Milana Kuzmina / Dmitrii Studenikin	176.66	4	70.32	4	106.34
5	Elizaveta Maleina / Matvei Samokhin	165.61	6	68.10	6	97.51
6	Vasilisa Grigoreva / Evgeni Artyushchenko	164.31	5	68.96	8	95.35
7	Arina Gorshenina / Ilya Makarov	163.66	9	64.67	5	98.99
8	Zoya Pestova / Sergei Lagutov	161.26	8	65.24	7	96.02
9	Anna Rumak / Gleb Goncharov	159.86	7	67.25	10	92.61
10	Yulia Churkina / Boris Frolov	157.34	10	63.18	9	94.16
11	Sofia Zagrebaeva / Veniamin Bashurov	152.96	11	60.48	11	92.48
12	Taisiia Linchevskaia / Dmitrii Shcherbakov	147.49	12	59.49	12	88.00
13	Maria Sorokina / Arseny Antropov	145.52	14	59.13	13	86.39
14	Daria Drozhzhina / Ivan Telnov	144.92	13	59.31	14	85.61
15	Milana Zhabina / Dmitrii Pekin	131.32	15	53.38	15	77.94

== International team selections ==
=== European Championships ===
The 2024 European Championships were held in Kaunas, Lithuania from 8 to 14 January 2024. However, on 1 March 2022, in accordance with a recommendation by the International Olympic Committee (IOC), the International Skating Union (ISU) banned figure skaters and officials from Russia from attending all international competitions due to the 2022 Russian invasion of Ukraine.

=== Winter Youth Olympics ===
The 2024 Winter Youth Olympics were held in Gangwon, South Korea from 19 January to 1 February 2024. However, on 28 February 2022, the International Olympic Committee (IOC) recommended sports federations to ban Russian athletes and officials from participating in international tournaments due to the 2022 Russian invasion of Ukraine. On 12 October 2023, the International Olympic Committee (IOC) announced the suspension of the membership of the Russian Olympic Committee (ROC) with immediate effect.

=== World Junior Championships ===
Commonly referred to as "Junior Worlds", the 2024 World Junior Championships were held in Taipei City, Chinese Taipei from 26 February to 3 March 2024. However, on 1 March 2022, in accordance with a recommendation by the International Olympic Committee (IOC), the International Skating Union (ISU) banned figure skaters and officials from Russia from attending all international competitions due to the 2022 Russian invasion of Ukraine.

=== World Championships ===
The 2024 World Championships were held in Montreal, Canada from 18 to 24 March 2024. However, on 1 March 2022, in accordance with a recommendation by the International Olympic Committee (IOC), the International Skating Union (ISU) banned figure skaters and officials from Russia from attending all international competitions due to the 2022 Russian invasion of Ukraine.
