= 2025 Russian Figure Skating Championships =

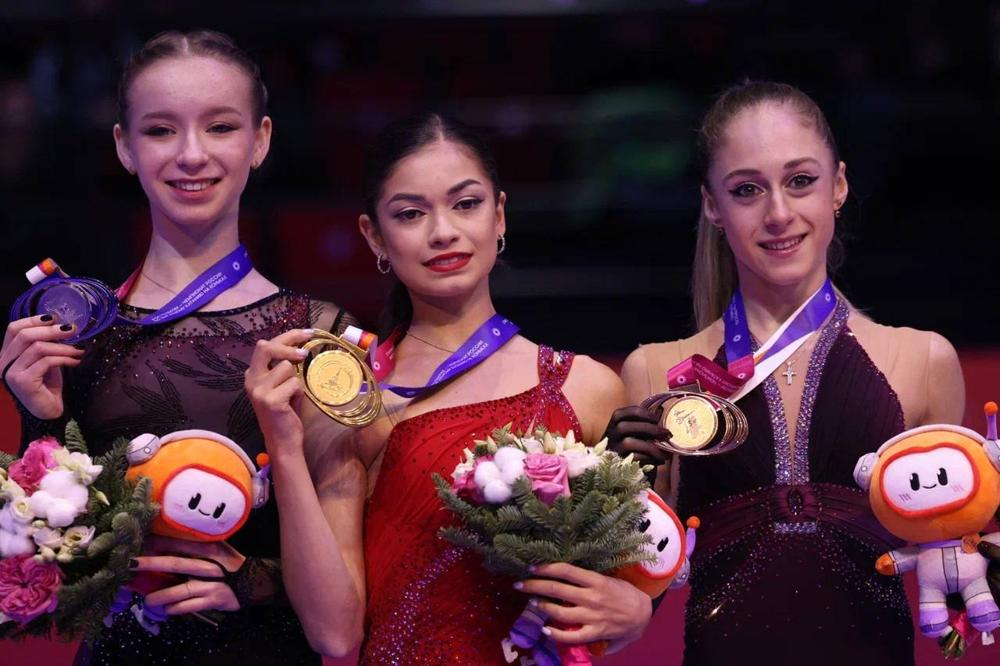
- The senior women's singles medalists
- Type: National championship
- Date: 18–22 December 2024 (S); 5–9 February 2025 (J)
- Season: 2024–25
- Location: Omsk (S); Saransk (J)
- Host: Figure Skating Federation of Russia
- Venue: G-Drive Arena (S); Universal Hall Ogarev Arena (J)

Champions
- Men's singles: Vladislav Dikidzhi (S); Lev Lazarev (J)
- Women's singles: Adeliia Petrosian (S); Elena Kostyleva (J)
- Pairs: Anastasia Mishina / Aleksandr Galliamov (S); Polina Shesheleva / Egor Karnaukhov (J)
- Ice dance: Alexandra Stepanova / Ivan Bukin (S); Elizaveta Maleina / Matvei Samokhin (J)
- Previous: 2024 Russian Championships
- Next: 2026 Russian Championships

The 2025 Russian Figure Skating Championships (Russian: Чемпионат России по фигурному катанию на коньках 2025) were held from 18 to 22 December 2024 in Omsk. Medals were awarded in the disciplines of men's singles, women's singles, pairs, and ice dance.

== Qualifying ==
In the 2024–25 season, Russian skaters competed in domestic qualifying events and national championships for various age levels. Russian Grand Prix for senior skaters and the All-Russian competitions for junior skaters, leads to four events – the Russian Championships, the Russian Junior Championships, the Russian Grand Prix Final and the All-Russian final competitions "Federation Cup".

From March 1, 2022, onwards, the International Skating Union banned all figure skaters and officials from Russia and Belarus from attending any international competitions following the 2022 Russian invasion of Ukraine. As a result, all skaters were required to qualify through the Russian Grand Prix and the All-Russian competitions' series.

Date	Event	Type	Location	Details
10–13 October 2024	Ice of Dreams	Qualifier	Moscow	Details
23–28 October 2024	Russian Grand Prix; Stars of Magnitka	Qualifier	Magnitogorsk, Chelyabinsk Oblast	Details; Details
30 October – 4 November 2024	Russian Grand Prix; Idel–2024	Qualifier	Kazan, Tatarstan	Details; Details
6–11 November 2024	Russian Grand Prix; Krasnoyarye	Qualifier	Krasnoyarsk, Krasnoyarsk Krai	Details; Details
13–18 November 2024	Russian Grand Prix; Golden Skate of Moscow	Qualifier	Moscow	Details; Details
20–25 November 2024	Russian Grand Prix; Neva Ice	Qualifier	Saint Petersburg	Details; Details
18–22 December 2024	2025 Russian Championships	Final	Omsk, Omsk Oblast	Details
5–9 February 2025	2025 Russian Junior Championships	Final	Saransk, Mordovia	Details
13–17 February 2025	2025 Russian Grand Prix Final	Final	Krasnoyarsk, Krasnoyarsk Krai	Details
20–24 February 2025	2025 Russian Youth Championships – Younger Age	Final	Yoshkar-Ola, Mari El	Details
27 February – 2 March 2025	2025 Federation Cup	Final	Kaluga, Kaluga Oblast	Details
31 March – 4 April 2025	2025 Russian Youth Championships – Elder Age	Final	Kazan, Tatarstan	Details

== Medalists of most important competitions ==
Senior Championships
Discipline	Gold	Silver	Bronze
Men	Vladislav Dikidzhi	Gleb Lutfullin	Evgeni Semenenko
Women	Adeliia Petrosian	Daria Sadkova	Alina Gorbacheva
Pairs	Anastasia Mishina / Aleksandr Galliamov	Aleksandra Boikova / Dmitrii Kozlovskii	Natalia Khabibullina / Ilya Knyazhuk
Ice dance	Alexandra Stepanova / Ivan Bukin	Elizaveta Khudaiberdieva / Egor Bazin	Irina Khavronina / Devid Naryzhnyy
Junior Championships
Discipline	Gold	Silver	Bronze
Men	Lev Lazarev	Arseny Fedotov	Makar Solodnikov
Women	Elena Kostyleva	Alisa Dvoeglazova	Sofia Dzepka
Pairs	Polina Shesheleva / Egor Karnaukhov	Taisiia Shcherbinina / Artem Petrov	Zoya Kovyazina / Artemiy Mokhov
Ice dance	Vasilisa Grigoreva / Evgeni Artyushchenko	Elizaveta Maleina / Matvei Samokhin	Zoya Pestova / Sergei Lagutov
Russian Grand Prix Final and All-Russian final competitions "Federation Cup"
Discipline	Gold	Silver	Bronze
Men	Petr Gumennik	Mark Kondratiuk	Evgeni Semenenko
Women	Adeliia Petrosian	Alina Gorbacheva	Anna Frolova
Pairs	Anastasia Mishina / Aleksandr Galliamov	Natalia Khabibullina / Ilya Knyazhuk	Aleksandra Boikova / Dmitrii Kozlovskii
Ice dance	Vasilisa Kaganovskaia / Maxim Nekrasov	Elizaveta Pasechnik / Dario Cirisano	Anna Shcherbakova / Egor Goncharov
Junior men	Nikita Sarnovskiy	Nikolay Kolesnikov	Lev Lazarev
Junior women	Elena Kostyleva	Alisa Dvoeglazova	Margarita Bazyliuk
Junior pairs	Polina Shesheleva / Egor Karnaukhov	Taisiia Shcherbinina / Artem Petrov	Sofia Diana Cousins / Aleksandr Bregey
Junior ice dance	Zoya Pestova / Sergei Lagutov	Maria Fefelova / Artem Valov	Daria Drozhzhina / Ivan Telnov
Youth Championships – Elder Age
Discipline	Gold	Silver	Bronze
Men	Nikita Sarnovskiy	Ilya Malkov	Roman Khamzin
Women	Victoria Streltsova	Lidia Pleskachova	Ekaterina Stotskaya
Pairs	Kira Domozhirova / Ilya Vegera	Viktoria Dvinina / Viktor Potapov	Taiisia Guseva / Daniil Ovchinnikov
Ice dance	Maria Fefelova / Artem Valov	Varvara Slutskaya / Gleb Goncharov	Polina Pilipenko / Vladislav Mikhailov
Youth Championships – Younger Age
Discipline	Gold	Silver	Bronze
Men	Dobromir Voronov	Artem Fedotov	Mark Sokolov
Women	Victoria Streltsova	Ekaterina Stotskaya	Anna Dokukina
Pairs	No pairs' discipline		
Ice dance	No ice dance discipline		

== Senior Championships ==
The 2025 Russian Championships were held in Omsk from 18 to 22 December 2024. Qualification was based on Russian Grand Prix series' results. In addition, figure skaters who were included in official pre-season national team roster but were unable to qualify through the Russian Grand Prix due to good reasons, could be included into list of participants by decision of the executive committee of the Figure Skating Federation of Russia.

=== Schedule ===
Listed in local time (UTC+06:00).

Day	Date	Start	Finish	Discipline	Event
Day 1	19 December	13:15	15:35	Ice dance	Rhythm dance
Day 1	19 December	16:00	17:10	Pairs	Short program
Day 1	19 December	17:40	18:10		Opening ceremony
Day 1	19 December	18:25	20:55	Men	Short program
Day 2	20 December	13:30	16:05	Ice dance	Free dance
Day 2	20 December	16:35	17:55	Pairs	Free skating
Day 2	20 December	18:25	20:55	Women	Short program
Day 3	21 December	14:45	17:40	Women	Free skating
Day 3	21 December	17:55	20:55	Men	Free skating
Day 4	22 December	12:30	13:15		Victory ceremonies
Day 4	22 December	13:30	16:00		Exhibition gala

=== Preliminary entries ===
The Figure Skating Federation of Russia published the official list of participants on 28 November 2024.

Men	Women	Pairs	Ice dance
Vladislav Dikidzhi	Adeliia Petrosian	Anastasia Mishina / Aleksandr Galliamov	Alexandra Stepanova / Ivan Bukin
Mark Kondratiuk	Anna Frolova	Aleksandra Boikova / Dmitrii Kozlovskii	Elizaveta Khudaiberdieva / Egor Bazin
Evgeni Semenenko	Alina Gorbacheva	Elizaveta Osokina / Artem Gritsaenko	Irina Khavronina / Devid Naryzhnyy
Gleb Lutfullin	Veronika Yametova	Anastasia Mukhortova / Dmitry Evgenyev	Vasilisa Kaganovskaia / Maxim Nekrasov
Roman Savosin	Daria Sadkova	Yasmina Kadyrova / Ilya Mironov	Ekaterina Mironova / Evgenii Ustenko
Nikolai Ugozhaev	Ksenia Gushchina	Alisa Blinnikova / Aleksei Karpov	Sofia Leontieva / Daniil Gorelkin
Grigory Fedorov	Sofia Vazhnova	Daria Andreeva / Aleksandr Akimov	Elizaveta Pasechnik / Dario Cirisano
Dmitri Aliev	Sofia Akateva		Sofia Shevchenko / Andrei Ezhlov
Petr Gumennik	Sofia Muravieva		Elizaveta Shichina / Pavel Drozd
Andrei Mozalev	Kseniia Sinitsyna		Anna Shcherbakova / Egor Goncharov
Matvei Vetlugin	Maria Agaeva		Ekaterina Rybakova / Ivan Makhnonosov
Artur Danielian	Kamilla Neliubova		~~Varvara Zhdanova / Timur Babaev-Smirnov~~ (withdrew)
Egor Rukhin	Elizaveta Kulikova		Milana Kuzmina / Dmitrii Studenikin
Makar Ignatov	Sofia Chaplygina		Sofya Tyutyunina / Matvei Grachyov
Daniil Samsonov	Ekaterina Anisimova		Anna Kolomenskaya / Artem Frolov
Ivan Popov	Lyudmila Fursova		
Daniil Postarnakov	Daria Tretyakova		
Mikhail Ternovskiy	Yana Bityushkova		
Substitutes
Artem Kovalev	Maria Paramonova	Natalia Khabibullina / Ilya Knyazhuk (added)	Daria Savkina / Alexander Vakhnov (added)
Semyon Soloviev	Viktoria Fedyanina		Yulia Churkina / Boris Frolov
Ilya Stroganov	Elizaveta Kiselyova		Alexandra Prokopets / Alexander Vaskovich

==== Changes to preliminary entries ====
Date	Discipline	Withdrew	Added	Reason/Other notes	Refs
28 November	Pairs	None	Natalia Khabibullina / Ilya Knyazhuk	Decision of the executive committee of the FSR	
5 December	Ice dance	Varvara Zhdanova / Timur Babaev-Smirnov	Daria Savkina / Alexander Vakhnov	Relapse of injury	

=== Senior results ===
==== Men's singles ====
Rank	Name	Total points	SP		FS	
1	Vladislav Dikidzhi	297.10	6	96.28	1	200.82
2	Gleb Lutfullin	283.02	3	97.85	3	185.17
3	Evgeni Semenenko	281.65	9	90.93	2	190.72
4	Petr Gumennik	278.29	2	102.65	5	175.64
5	Mark Kondratiuk	274.07	1	105.04	8	169.03
6	Makar Ignatov	273.57	7	96.22	4	177.35
7	Daniil Samsonov	263.96	8	91.09	6	172.87
8	Ivan Popov	262.19	10	89.98	7	172.21
9	Dmitri Aliev	258.91	4	97.78	11	161.13
10	Roman Savosin	254.16	5	97.56	12	156.60
11	Andrei Mozalev	252.72	12	85.05	10	167.67
12	Matvei Vetlugin	245.83	13	77.48	9	168.35
13	Mikhail Ternovskiy	244.47	11	88.95	15	155.52
14	Nikolai Ugozhaev	223.35	15	67.44	14	155.91
15	Grigory Fedorov	220.43	16	64.28	13	156.15
16	Artur Danielian	210.72	17	62.88	16	147.84
17	Egor Rukhin	201.99	14	76.99	17	125.00
18	Daniil Postarnakov	173.64	18	56.21	18	117.43

==== Women's singles ====
Rank	Name	Total points	SP		FS	
1	Adeliia Petrosian	262.92	1	85.78	1	177.14
2	Daria Sadkova	234.69	5	73.15	2	161.54
3	Alina Gorbacheva	223.92	2	77.57	6	146.35
4	Sofia Muravieva	223.90	6	73.10	3	150.80
5	Sofia Akateva	222.02	8	71.62	4	150.40
6	Anna Frolova	221.81	3	75.01	5	146.80
7	Veronika Yametova	216.98	7	71.94	7	145.04
8	Ksenia Gushchina	215.18	4	73.38	8	141.80
9	Sofia Vazhnova	208.66	10	67.78	9	140.88
10	Kseniia Sinitsyna	203.93	9	69.99	10	133.94
11	Maria Agaeva	199.88	11	67.74	11	132.14
12	Elizaveta Kulikova	196.34	12	65.58	12	130.76
13	Sofia Chaplygina	188.72	13	62.69	13	126.03
14	Daria Tretyakova	183.81	14	61.30	14	122.51
15	Ekaterina Anisimova	174.21	16	56.16	15	118.05
16	Kamilla Neliubova	169.04	15	60.53	18	108.51
17	Lyudmila Fursova	167.77	17	50.06	16	117.71
18	Yana Bityushkova	159.77	18	49.75	17	110.02

==== Pair skating ====
Rank	Name	Total points	SP		FS	
1	Anastasia Mishina / Aleksandr Galliamov	239.40	1	82.95	1	156.45
2	Aleksandra Boikova / Dmitrii Kozlovskii	216.37	3	73.40	2	142.97
3	Natalia Khabibullina / Ilya Knyazhuk	214.15	2	74.17	3	139.98
4	Anastasia Mukhortova / Dmitry Evgenyev	207.10	4	72.52	5	134.58
5	Elizaveta Osokina / Artem Gritsaenko	204.14	6	68.71	4	135.43
6	Yasmina Kadyrova / Ilya Mironov	197.21	5	71.30	6	125.91
7	Daria Andreeva / Aleksandr Akimov	169.23	8	57.68	7	111.55
8	Alisa Blinnikova / Aleksei Karpov	155.38	7	61.14	8	94.24

==== Ice dance ====
Rank	Name	Total points	RD		FD	
1	Alexandra Stepanova / Ivan Bukin	215.96	1	85.62	1	130.34
2	Elizaveta Khudaiberdieva / Egor Bazin	209.01	3	83.55	2	125.46
3	Irina Khavronina / Devid Naryzhnyy	208.56	2	83.96	3	124.60
4	Vasilisa Kaganovskaia / Maxim Nekrasov	202.76	5	79.72	4	123.04
5	Elizaveta Pasechnik / Dario Cirisano	200.81	4	81.53	6	119.28
6	Ekaterina Mironova / Evgenii Ustenko	198.63	6	79.34	5	119.29
7	Sofia Leontieva / Daniil Gorelkin	194.89	7	78.13	7	116.76
8	Anna Shcherbakova / Egor Goncharov	192.17	8	76.75	10	115.42
9	Sofia Shevchenko / Andrei Ezhlov	191.14	9	75.70	9	115.44
10	Elizaveta Shichina / Pavel Drozd	189.56	11	74.07	8	115.49
11	Ekaterina Rybakova / Ivan Makhnonosov	188.72	10	74.79	11	113.93
12	Milana Kuzmina / Dmitrii Studenikin	186.14	12	72.86	12	113.28
13	Anna Kolomenskaya / Artem Frolov	182.23	13	72.63	13	109.60
14	Daria Savkina / Alexander Vakhnov	178.62	14	70.77	14	107.85
WD	Sofya Tyutyunina / Matvei Grachyov	withdrew	15	68.15	withdrew from competition	

== Junior Championships ==
The 2025 Russian Junior Championships (Russian: Первенство России среди юниоров 2025) were held in Saransk, Mordovia from 5 to 9 February 2025. Qualification was based on results of the All-Russian competitions' series (which were held alongside the Russian Grand Prix series among senior skaters). These junior figure skaters who qualified to the Senior Championships through the Russian Grand Prix series can be included into list of participants without additional qualification. In addition, figure skaters who were included in the official pre-season national team roster but were unable to qualify through the All-Russian competitions' series due to good reasons, also could be included into list of participants by decision of the executive committee of the Figure Skating Federation of Russia.

=== Schedule ===
Listed in local time (UTC+03:00).

Day	Date	Start	Finish	Discipline	Event
Day 1	6 February	14:00	16:20	Men	Short program
Day 1	6 February	16:40	17:10		Opening ceremony
Day 1	6 February	17:10	19:30	Women	Short program
Day 1	6 February	19:45	21:50	Ice dance	Rhythm dance
Day 2	7 February	13:15	15:50	Men	Free skating
Day 2	7 February	16:05	16:15		Victory ceremony
Day 2	7 February	16:15	18:50	Women	Free skating
Day 2	7 February	19:05	19:15		Victory ceremony
Day 2	7 February	19:15	21:05	Pairs	Short program
Day 3	8 February	12:00	14:15	Ice dance	Free dance
Day 3	8 February	14:30	14:40		Victory ceremony
Day 3	8 February	14:40	16:30	Pairs	Free skating
Day 3	8 February	16:45	17:00		Victory ceremony

=== Preliminary entries ===
The Figure Skating Federation of Russia published the official list of participants on 22 January 2025.

Men	Women	Pairs	Ice dance
Lev Lazarev	Elena Kostyleva	Polina Shesheleva / Egor Karnaukhov	Elizaveta Maleina / Matvei Samokhin
Nikita Sarnovskiy	Alisa Dvoeglazova	Taisiia Shcherbinina / Artem Petrov	Vasilisa Grigoreva / Evgeni Artyushchenko
Arseny Fedotov	Lidia Pleskachova	Anastasia Chernyshova / Vladislav Vilchik	Arina Gorshenina / Ilya Makarov
Nikolay Kolesnikov	Elizaveta Andreeva	Veronika Merenkova / Danil Galimov	Maria Fefelova / Artem Valov
Vadim Voronov	Alena Prineva	Zoya Kovyazina / Artemiy Mokhov	Zoya Pestova / Sergei Lagutov
Eduard Karartynian	Margarita Bazyliuk	Sofia Diana Cousins / Aleksandr Bregey	Varvara Slutskaya / Gleb Goncharov
~~Aleksandr Semkov~~ (withdrew)	Agata Petrova	Kira Domozhirova / Ilya Vegera	Kamilla Sharafutdinova / Rodion Murasalimov
Mikhail Aleksakhin	Sofia Dzepka	Olga Sabada / Pavel Astakhov	Daria Drozhzhina / Ivan Telnov
Gleb Kovtun	Valeria Lukashova	Viktoria Dvinina / Viktor Potapov	Liliya Litenko / Ignat Pakhomov
Mark Lukin	Anna Lyashenko	Maya Shegay / Andrei Shaderkov	Elizaveta Rostilova / Denis Aurov
Makar Solodnikov	Lyubov Rubtsova	Anna Moskaleva / Artem Rodzyanov	Taisiia Sheptalina / Dmitry Pekin
Maxim Badavi	Elizaveta Labutina	Albina Kamaldinova / Dmitrii Rodionov	Aleksandra Finokhina / Nikita Ivanov
Ilya Malkov	Varvara Liss		~~Eva Plesovskikh / Mark Zheltyshev~~ (withdrew)
Ilya Malyshev	Polina Tikhonova		Polina Pilipenko / Vladislav Mikhailov
Mikhail Tikhonov	Dina Khusnutdinova		Irina Skopina / Dmitrii Simonov
Makar Puzin	Valeria Litvinchyova		
German Lenkov	Milana Lebedeva		
Artemiy Marinin	Maria Kotova		
Substitutes
Ivan Ramzenkov	Alena Krivonosova	Valeria Khodykina / Aleksei Belkin	Anna Bilibina / Dmitrii Kashaev (added)
Matvei Bugaev	Diana Milto	Varvara Cheremnykh / Andrei Rud	Anna Soboleva / Matvei Churakov
Fedor Barchenko-Emelyanov	Alisa Yurova	Yulia Filimonova / Ilya Pylnev	Evdokia Kryuchkova / Artem Myakishev

==== Changes to preliminary entries ====
Date	Discipline	Withdrew	Added	Reason/Other notes	Refs
22 January	Ice dance	Eva Plesovskikh / Mark Zheltyshev	Anna Bilibina / Dmitrii Kashaev		
6 February	Men	Aleksandr Semkov	None	Leg injury after an accident sustained in practice	

=== Junior results ===
==== Men's singles ====
Rank	Name	Total points	SP		FS	
1	Lev Lazarev	258.80	1	87.23	1	171.57
2	Arseny Fedotov	241.32	2	84.98	3	156.34
3	Makar Solodnikov	231.21	12	72.66	2	158.55
4	Eduard Karartynian	227.90	3	81.40	8	146.50
5	German Lenkov	227.36	10	73.92	4	153.44
6	Vadim Voronov	225.71	4	78.75	7	146.96
7	Mikhail Aleksakhin	221.96	11	73.78	6	148.18
8	Nikolay Kolesnikov	218.45	6	77.77	10	140.68
9	Maxim Badavi	215.80	9	74.70	9	141.10
10	Makar Puzin	210.98	8	75.63	11	135.35
11	Nikita Sarnovskiy	208.78	17	60.31	5	148.47
12	Mikhail Tikhonov	196.44	13	71.71	12	124.73
13	Artemiy Marinin	195.49	14	70.86	13	124.63
14	Ilya Malyshev	187.94	15	65.48	14	122.46
15	Mark Lukin	187.66	7	76.94	16	110.72
16	Ilya Malkov	186.07	16	64.34	15	121.73
WD	Gleb Kovtun	withdrew	5	77.98	withdrew from competition	

==== Women's singles ====
Rank	Name	Total points	SP		FS	
1	Elena Kostyleva	233.10	1	74.57	1	158.53
2	Alisa Dvoeglazova	231.56	3	73.25	2	158.31
3	Sofia Dzepka	218.38	4	72.98	4	145.40
4	Elizaveta Andreeva	216.68	5	71.25	3	145.43
5	Agata Petrova	203.83	6	70.64	5	133.19
6	Alena Prineva	200.48	7	70.54	7	129.94
7	Valeria Lukashova	199.89	9	69.45	6	130.44
8	Lidia Pleskachova	198.81	8	70.19	8	128.62
9	Margarita Bazyliuk	194.31	2	74.35	15	119.96
10	Milana Lebedeva	191.96	12	65.16	10	126.80
11	Anna Lyashenko	191.06	13	64.05	9	127.01
12	Lyubov Rubtsova	190.26	10	67.28	13	122.98
13	Dina Khusnutdinova	187.06	11	66.82	14	120.24
14	Varvara Liss	186.39	14	63.40	12	122.99
15	Elizaveta Labutina	181.06	18	54.72	11	126.34
16	Valeria Litvinchyova	178.67	17	60.59	16	118.08
17	Maria Kotova	173.02	16	61.57	17	111.45
18	Polina Tikhonova	167.88	15	61.87	18	106.01

==== Pair skating ====
Rank	Name	Total points	SP		FS	
1	Polina Shesheleva / Egor Karnaukhov	194.80	4	65.40	1	129.40
2	Taisiia Shcherbinina / Artem Petrov	190.99	1	67.45	2	123.54
3	Zoya Pestova / Sergei Lagutov	188.48	2	66.43	3	122.05
4	Sofia Diana Cousins / Aleksandr Bregey	183.97	3	65.90	5	118.07
5	Anna Moskaleva / Artem Rodzyanov	177.99	9	61.38	6	116.61
6	Anastasia Chernyshova / Vladislav Vilchik	175.68	6	62.24	7	113.44
7	Maya Shegay / Andrei Shaderkov	175.32	5	63.21	9	112.11
8	Veronika Merenkova / Danil Galimov	175.03	7	61.65	8	113.38
9	Olga Sabada / Pavel Astakhov	172.65	8	61.54	10	111.11
10	Kira Domozhirova / Ilya Vegera	171.14	12	52.91	4	118.23
11	Viktoria Dvinina / Viktor Potapov	162.05	10	56.47	11	105.58
12	Albina Kamaldinova / Dmitrii Rodionov	139.70	11	56.43	12	83.27

==== Ice dance ====
Rank	Name	Total points	RD		FD	
1	Vasilisa Grigoreva / Evgeni Artyushchenko	177.81	1	72.84	2	104.97
2	Elizaveta Maleina / Matvei Samokhin	176.00	3	69.20	1	106.80
3	Zoya Pestova / Sergei Lagutov	172.52	2	69.33	3	103.19
4	Arina Gorshenina / Ilya Makarov	169.69	4	67.27	4	102.42
5	Maria Fefelova / Artem Valov	166.91	5	66.33	5	100.58
6	Daria Drozhzhina / Ivan Telnov	162.77	7	63.26	6	99.51
7	Taisiia Sheptalina / Dmitry Pekin	159.40	6	65.43	7	93.97
8	Kamilla Sharafutdinova / Rodion Murasalimov	156.21	8	62.83	9	93.38
9	Liliya Litenko / Ignat Pakhomov	155.26	9	61.87	8	93.39
10	Anna Bilibina / Dmitrii Kashaev	153.08	10	60.77	11	92.31
11	Polina Pilipenko / Vladislav Mikhailov	152.75	12	59.40	10	93.35
12	Varvara Slutskaya / Gleb Goncharov	151.51	11	60.31	12	91.20
13	Elizaveta Rostilova / Denis Aurov	144.37	13	56.04	13	88.33
14	Aleksandra Finokhina / Nikita Ivanov	140.01	14	55.80	15	84.21
15	Irina Skopina / Dmitrii Simonov	139.04	15	51.60	14	87.44

== International team selections ==
=== Winter World University Games ===
The 2025 Winter World University Games were held in Turin, Italy from 13 to 23 January 2025. However, on 12 March 2022, in accordance with a recommendation by the International Olympic Committee (IOC), FISU's Steering Committee suspended the participation of Russia from FISU competitions and activities due to the 2022 Russian invasion of Ukraine.

=== European Championships ===
The 2025 European Championships were held in Tallinn, Estonia from 28 January to 2 February 2025. However, on 1 March 2022, in accordance with a recommendation by the International Olympic Committee (IOC), the International Skating Union (ISU) banned figure skaters and officials from Russia from attending all international competitions due to the 2022 Russian invasion of Ukraine.

=== European Youth Olympic Winter Festival ===
The 2025 European Youth Olympic Winter Festival was held in Batumi, Georgia from 9 to 16 February 2025. However, on 2 March 2022, in accordance with a recommendation by the International Olympic Committee (IOC), European Olympic Committees (EOC) suspended the participation of Russia from European Youth Olympic Festivals due to the 2022 Russian invasion of Ukraine.

=== World Junior Championships ===
Commonly referred to as "Junior Worlds", the 2025 World Junior Championships were held in Debrecen, Hungary from 25 February to 2 March 2025. However, on 1 March 2022, in accordance with a recommendation by the International Olympic Committee (IOC), the International Skating Union (ISU) banned figure skaters and officials from Russia from attending all international competitions due to the 2022 Russian invasion of Ukraine.

=== World Championships ===
The 2025 World Championships were held in Boston, United States from 25 to 30 March 2025. However, on 1 March 2022, in accordance with a recommendation by the International Olympic Committee (IOC), the International Skating Union (ISU) banned figure skaters and officials from Russia from attending all international competitions due to the 2022 Russian invasion of Ukraine.

=== World Team Trophy ===
The 2025 World Team Trophy was held in Tokyo, Japan from 17 to 20 April 2025. However, on 1 March 2022, in accordance with a recommendation by the International Olympic Committee (IOC), the International Skating Union (ISU) banned figure skaters and officials from Russia from attending all international competitions due to the 2022 Russian invasion of Ukraine.
