= Sofia Muravieva =

Russian figure skater

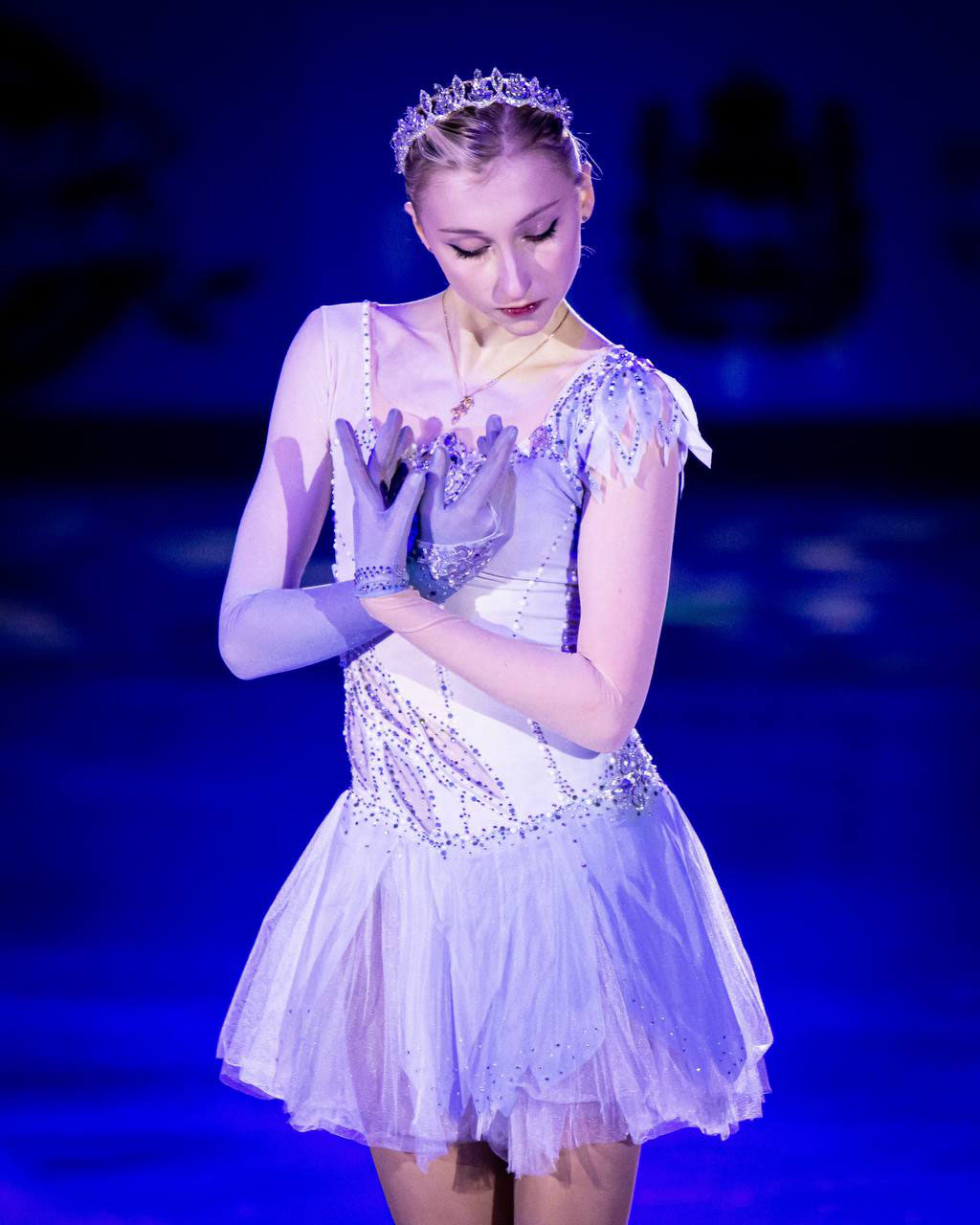
- Sofia Muravieva at the 2024 Russian Championships

Personal information
- Native name: Софья Андреевна Муравьева (Russian)
- Full name: Sofia Andreevna Muravieva
- Other names: Sofya Muravyova
- Born: 4 August 2006 (age 20) Moscow, Russia
- Height: 1.55 m (5 ft 1 in)

Figure skating career
- Country: Russia
- Discipline: Women's singles
- Coach: Evgeni Plushenko
- Skating club: Angels of Plushenko
- Began skating: 2009

Medal record
Russian Championships
Silver medal – second place	2024 Chelyabinsk	Singles
Bronze medal – third place	2023 Krasnoyarsk	Singles

Sofia Andreevna Muravieva (Russian: Софья Андреевна Муравьёва; born 4 August 2006) is a Russian figure skater. She is the 2021 JGP Cup of Austria champion, the 2021 JGP Slovakia silver medalist, the 2024 Russian national silver medalist, and a two-time Russian junior national bronze medalist (2021, 2022).

== Personal life ==
Muravieva was born on August 4, 2006, in Moscow, Russia. Her mother, Olga, sews and designs all of Muravieva's figure skating costumes. Muravieva has few older brothers.

== Career ==
=== Early years ===
Muravieva began figure skating in 2009 at the age of three; enrolling at the Tchaikovskaia Konyok Sports Mastery School, where she was coached by Elena Tchaikovskaia and Maria Kleymenova. At the age of seven, she transferred to the CSKA Moscow, where she was coached by Sergei Davydov. Muravieva trained there for six years before deciding to leave at the age of thirteen in December 2019 after being offered a tryout period to join Eteri Tutberidze's group at Sambo 70 (Khrustalny). However, she was ultimately not accepted into the group and because of this, Muravieva made her national debut at the 2020 Russian Junior Championships without a coach. After finishing the event in ninth place, Muravieva and her mother reached out to Evgeni Plushenko to see if she would be able to join his then newly established skating school. Following a successful tryout, Muravieva was ultimately enrolled into Plushenko's school.

=== 2020–2021 season ===
Although Muravieva was age eligible to compete in the 2020–21 ISU Junior Grand Prix circuit, the series was ultimately canceled due to the global COVID-19 pandemic. At the 2020 Russian Grand Prix II, Moscow, Muravieva won the silver medal behind Elizaveta Berestovskaya. Going on to compete at the 2020 Russian Grand Prix IV, Kazan, she placed third in the short program but ended up withdrawing from the free skate segment.

Muravieva went on to compete at the 2021 Russian Junior Championships, where she won the bronze medal behind Sofia Akateva and Adeliia Petrosian.

=== 2021–2022 season: International debut ===
Muravieva became age-eligible to compete at the senior level in domestic competitions for the 2021–2022 season; however, she was not eligible for senior international competitions due to her birthday being one month after the cutoff, July 1, 2006. She received two assignments in the 2021–22 ISU Junior Grand Prix (JGP) circuit. She made her international debut at the 2021 JGP Slovakia, where she placed first in the short program, second in the free skate, and second overall behind Veronika Zhilina with a total score of 208.25. She then competed at the 2021 JGP Austria where she won the gold medal with a total score of 211.81. Due to the COVID-19 pandemic, the International Skating Union announced an alternate qualifying procedure for the 2021–22 Junior Grand Prix Final which allowed each winner of the Junior Grand Prix events to qualify for the final as opposed to evaluating the results of each skater over two events. Therefore, Muravieva's gold medal at the Junior Grand Prix in Austria qualified her a spot for the 2021–22 Junior Grand Prix Final. The event was scheduled to be held in Osaka in December; however, the event was canceled due to the COVID-19 pandemic in Japan.

Going on to compete domestically, Muravieva won the silver medal behind Sofia Samodelkina at the 2021 Russian Grand Prix III, Sirius. She then went on to win the gold medal at the 2021 Russian Grand Prix V, Perm.

Debuting on the senior national level, Muravieva competed at the 2022 Russian Championships. She initially finished second in the short program behind Kamila Valieva with a score of 81.87. However, her score was ultimately given a one-point deduction after it was determined that she took thirty-two seconds to take her start position rather than the maximum thirty seconds. This change in score moved Muravieva down to third place behind Anna Shcherbakova. She placed sixth overall with a total score of 230.31.

At the 2022 Russian Junior Championships, Muravieva won the bronze medal for a second consecutive time.

=== 2022–2023 season: Bronze national medal ===
All Russian figure skaters were banned from competing international competition by the International Skating Union. Thus, Muravieva instead competed domestically on the Russian Grand Prix series (a series of all-Russian competitions in the same format as the international Grand Prix series). Competing at the 2022 Russian Grand Prix IV, Moscow and the 2022 Russian Grand Prix VI, Perm, she took silver at both events.

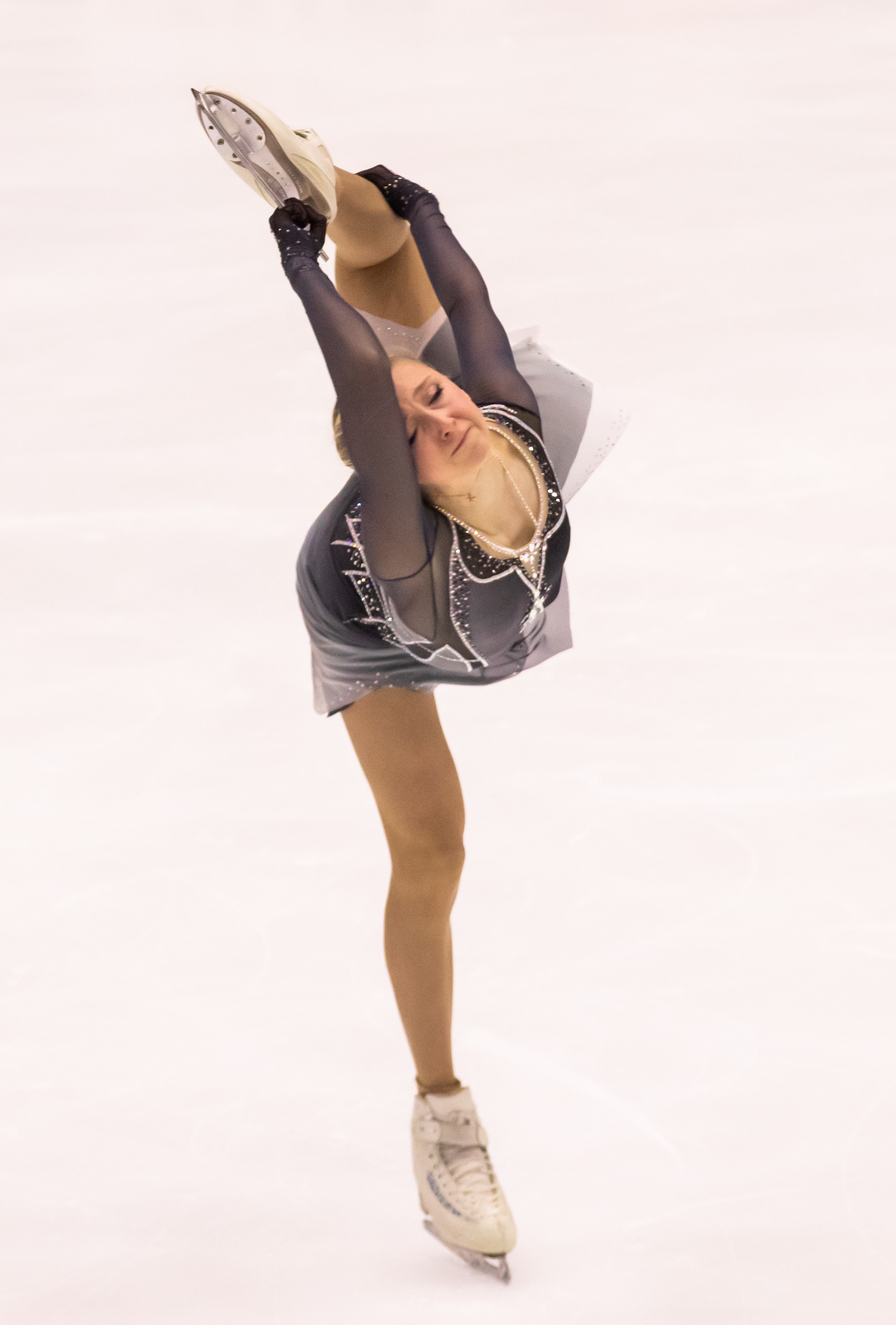
Muravieva performing a catch-foot camel spin at the 2023 Russian GP Stage 4

Going on to compete at the 2023 Russian Championships, Muravieva finished the event in third place. She then closed the season by placing fifth at the 2023 Russian Grand Prix Final.

=== 2023–2024 season: Silver national medal ===
Muravieva began the season by competing at the 2023 Russian Grand Prix IV, Kazan and the 2023 Russian Grand Prix VI, Moscow, winning gold and bronze, respectively. She then finished the season by finishing second at the 2024 Russian Championships behind Adeliia Petrosian.

=== 2024–2025 season ===
Muravieva started the season by competing at the 2025 Russian Grand Prix III, Krasnoyarsk and the 2024 Russian Grand Prix V, St. Petersburg, placing fourth at both events. She then went on to compete at the 2025 Russian Championships, where she finished fourth overall.

In February, Muravieva competed at the 2025 Russian Grand Prix Final. Although she won the short program, Muravieva struggled during the free skate, only placing seventh in that segment. She ultimately finished the event in fourth place.

It was later revealed that Muravieva struggled with health-related issues throughout the season. On April 14, 2025, it was announced that Muravieva was leaving Evgeni Plushenko’s academy “Angels of Plushenko.” An article by RIA Novosti said “Sofia Muravieva was expelled from Evgeni Plushenko’s academy for "systematic violations" of the training process. This was alleged to have included disruption of training, rudeness towards coaches, and breaking the ice. In spite of this announcement, Muravieva took to her social media accounts, expressing gratitude towards everyone that worked with her at the FS Academy of Evgeni Plushenko. The following week, it was announced that Muravieva had moved to Saint Petersburg, where Alexei Mishin became her new coach.

=== 2025–2026 season: Request to change citizenship ===
Muravieva opened the season by finishing fifth at the 2025 Russian Grand Prix V, Omsk and fourth at the 2025 Russian Grand Prix III, Kazan. She then went on to finish fifth at the 2026 Russian Championships. In early March, Sofia finished 4th at the 2026 Russian Grand Prix Final, missing the podium by 0.2 points.

In early May, it was announced that Muravieva ended her partnership with Alexei Mishin at the coach's initiative. Following this, Muravieva requested to be excluded from the Russian national team, citing future hopes of representing a different sports federation in the near future.

=== 2026–2027 season ===
During the early season, RIA Novosti shared that Muravieva would continue training in Russia after being unsuccessful in obtaining a new sporting citizenship. It was additionally shared that changing her sports citizenship was no longer a top priority.

Muravieva competed at the Russian Grand Prix stage in Kazan without a coach. She reused her short program from the previous season, and choreographed a new free program with Nikita Mikhailov. Muravieva placed fifth in the short program, later dropping to tenth place overall following the free skate. Muravieva shared that she had only prepared for the season for one month; "I had a little time to prepare. There was a time when nothing was clear at all. I thought I wouldn't go out at all in the season, so I didn't really prepare. When I realized that I would perform, I tried to prepare myself in about a month." Following the event, Evgeni Plushenko announced that Muravieva had returned to train at the Angels of Plushenko Academy.

Muravieva returned to the Russian Grand Prix the following month, in Omsk. Placing third in both program segments and overall, she won the bronze medal, making this her first podium finish in two years. Following her results, Muravieva expressed gratitude towards Plushenko; "I considered it the best decision to return to Evgeny Viktorovich, we have very good relations. Everything is for the best! Happy with new strength and mood to enter the season again for myself, hand in hand with it. If it weren't for Kazan, the reunion probably wouldn't have happened, so I'm glad that the stars came together in this way."

== Programs ==
Season	Short program	Free skating	Exhibition
2026–2027	Carmen; Regardons passer les gens; Waltz Tango; Finale by Nicholas Britell & Georges Bizet choreo. by Ilia Averbukh	Unstoppable; Courage to Change by Sia choreo. by Nikita Mikhailov	
2025–2026	Carmen; Regardons passer les gens; Waltz Tango; Finale by Nicholas Britell & Georges Bizet choreo. by Ilia Averbukh	A Model of the Universe (from The Theory of Everything) by Jóhann Jóhannsson; Fuel to Fire by Agnes Obel; Marvel by Ryan Taubert choreo. by Benoît Richaud	Poker Face by Lady Gaga; Ne me quitte pas by Jacques Brel performed by Celine Dion choreo. by Sergei Rozanov, Dmitrii Mikhailov, Evgeni Plushenko
2024–2025	The Black Swan; Ethnic Vocals by Soul Pacifica; A Swan is Born (from Black Swan) by Clint Mansell; Pas de Six Intrada (from Swan Lake) by Pyotr Ilyich Tchaikovsky performed by André Previn choreo. by Nikita Mikhailov, Natalia Linichuk	The White Swan; Swan Lake by Pyotr Ilyich Tchaikovsky performed by Universal Production Music and David Garrett; Mother Me (from Black Swan) by Clint Mansell choreo. by Nikita Mikhailov, Natalia Linichuk	Your Art; (It Goes Like) Nanana by Peggy Gou; Ne me quitte pas by Jacques Brel performed by Celine Dion choreo. by Sergei Rozanov, Dmitrii Mikhailov, Evgeni Plushenko
2023–2024	Horizon of Memories by Eternal Eclipse and Ranya choreo. by Dmitrii Mikhailov, Evgeni Plushenko	Pilgrims on a Long Journey by Cœur de pirate; Wicked Game by Chris Isaak performed by Ursine Vulpine and Annaca; Gefion by Christian Reindl and Lucie Paradis choreo. by Dmitrii Mikhailov, Evgeni Plushenko	The Swan by Camille Saint-Saëns
2022–2023	Proud by Tamara Todevska choreo. by Dmitrii Mikhailov	Love Theme (from Romeo and Juliet) by Nino Rota choreo. by Dmitrii Mikhailov	Ne me quitte pas by Jacques Brel performed by Celine Dion choreo. by Sergei Rozanov, Dmitrii Mikhailov, Evgeni Plushenko
2021–2022	Ne me quitte pas by Jacques Brel performed by Celine Dion choreo. by Sergei Rozanov, Dmitrii Mikhailov, Evgeni Plushenko	The Great Gatsby; "Gatsby Believed in the Green Light" by Craig Armstrong, Tobey Maguire; Magic Tree And I Let Myself Go by Craig Armstrong, Lana Del Rey; Young and Beautiful by Lana Del Rey choreo. by Dmitrii Mikhailov, Sofia Muravieva	
2020–2021	Ne me quitte pas by Jacques Brel performed by Celine Dion choreo. by Sergei Rozanov, Dmitrii Mikhailov, Evgeni Plushenko	Liebesträume by Franz Liszt; Moonlight Sonata by Ludwig van Beethoven choreo. by Nadezhda Popova	
2019–2020	The Four Seasons: Summer by Antonio Vivaldi	Crimson Peak; Allerdale Hall; Credits by Fernando Velázquez	
2018–2019	Primavera by Ludovico Einaudi	The Barber of Siberia; Jane and Andreï; Cadets and Maidens; The Love by Eduard Artemyev	
2017–2018	Primavera by Ludovico Einaudi	The Barber of Siberia; Jane and Andreï; Cadets and Maidens; The Love by Eduard Artemyev	

== Competitive highlights ==
JGP: Junior Grand Prix

International: Junior
Event	18–19	19–20	20–21	21–22	22–23	23–24	24–25	25–26	26–27
JGP Final				C					
JGP Austria				1st					
JGP Slovakia				2nd					
National
Russian Champ.				4th	3rd	2nd	4th	4th	
Russian Cup Final (Note: The 2023 Russian Cup Final was renamed as the 2023 Russian Grand Prix Final.)		4th J			5th		4th	4th	
Russian Junior Champ.		9th	3rd	3rd					
Russian GP Stage 1									10th
Russian GP Stage 2			2nd J						
Russian GP Stage 3				2nd			4th	5th	
Russian GP Stage 4		12th J	WD J		2nd	1st			
Russian GP Stage 5	3rd J	5th J		1st			4th	4th	3rd
Russian GP Stage 6					2nd	3rd			

== Detailed results ==
ISU personal best scores in the +5/-5 GOE System
Segment	Type	Score	Event
Total	TSS	211.81	2021 JGP Austria
Short program	TSS	73.28	2021 JGP Austria
Short program	TES	41.54	2021 JGP Austria
Short program	PCS	31.74	2021 JGP Austria
Free skating	TSS	138.53	2021 JGP Austria
Free skating	TES	74.25	2021 JGP Austria
Free skating	PCS	65.14	2021 JGP Slovakia

=== Senior results ===
2026–27 season
Date	Event	SP	FS	Total
16–19 October, 2026	2026 Russian Grand Prix, Kazan	5 63.21	10 111.47	10 174.68
13–16 November, 2026	2026 Russian Grand Prix, Omsk	3 72.68	3 131.47	3 204.15

2025–26 season
Date	Event	SP	FS	Total
21–24 November 2025	2025 Russian Grand Prix V, Omsk	3; 71.18	4; 132.71	4; 203.89
7–10 November 2025	2025 Russian Grand Prix III, Kazan	2; 72.60	7; 125.31	5; 197.91
17–22 December 2025	2026 Russian Championships	10 69.23	3 146.51	5 215.74
6–9 March 2026	2026 Russian Grand Prix Final	3 73.51	6 137.14	4 210.65
2024–25 season
Date	Event	SP	FS	Total
14–16 February 2025	2025 Russian Grand Prix Final	1; 77.01	7; 137.04	4; 214.05
19–22 December 2024	2025 Russian Championships	6; 73.10	3; 150.80	4; 223.90
22–25 November 2024	2024 Russian Grand Prix V, St. Petersburg	4; 68.78	4; 137.07	4; 205.85
8–11 November 2024	2025 Russian Grand Prix III, Krasnoyarsk	2; 73.47	5; 127.01	4; 200.48
2023–24 season
Date	Event	SP	FS	Total
20–24 December 2023	2024 Russian Championships	3; 78.33	2; 161.07	2; 239.40
24–27 November 2023	2023 Russian Grand Prix VI, Moscow	2; 76.67	5; 133.58	3; 210.25
10–13 November 2023	2023 Russian Grand Prix IV, Kazan	2; 77.02	1; 151.79	1; 228.81
2022–23 season
Date	Event	SP	FS	Total
3–5 March 2023	2023 Russian Grand Prix Final	4; 77.94	6; 155.10	5; 233.04
20–26 December 2022	2023 Russian Championships	3; 79.96	5; 156.00	4; 235.96
28–30 November 2022	2022 Russian Grand Prix VI, Perm	1; 81.59	2; 157.56	2; 239.15
21–24 October 2022	2022 Russian Grand Prix IV, Moscow	3; 82.24	2; 148.32	2; 230.56
2021–2022 season
Date	Event	SP	FS	Total
21–26 December 2021	2022 Russian Championships	3; 80.87	6; 149.44	5; 230.31
17–21 November 2021	2021 Russian Grand Prix V, Perm	1; 83.05	2; 133.59	1; 216.64
24–28 October 2021	2021 Russian Grand Prix III, Sirius	2; 73.33	2; 141.49	2; 214.82

=== Junior results ===
2021–2022 season
Date	Event	SP	FS	Total
18–22 January 2022	2022 Russian Junior Championships	6; 68.38	2; 143.24	3; 211.62
6–9 October 2021	2021 JGP Austria	1; 73.28	1; 138.53	1; 211.81
1–4 September 2021	2021 JGP Slovakia	1; 72.52	2; 135.73	2; 208.25
2020–2021 season
Date	Event	SP	FS	Total
1–5 February 2021	2021 Russian Junior Championships	1; 72.97	4; 135.16	3; 208.13
8–12 November 2020	2020 Russian Grand Prix IV, Kazan	3; 67.71	WD	WD
10–13 October 2020	2020 Russian Grand Prix II, Moscow	2; 72.72	3; 126.38	2; 199.10
2019–2020 season
Date	Event	SP	FS	Total
18–22 February 2020	2020 Russian Cup Final	5; 69.00	5; 124.64	4; 193.64
4–8 February 2020	2020 Russian Junior Championships	7; 66.90	11; 124.94	9; 191.84
20–24 November 2019	2019 Russian Grand Prix V, Moscow	2; 68.74	8; 113.39	5; 182.13
11–15 November 2019	2019 Russian Grand Prix IV, Kazan	12; 56.39	8; 119.08	8; 175.47
2018–2019 season
Date	Event	SP	FS	Total
20–24 November 2018	2018 Russian Grand Prix V, Moscow	4; 63.01	3; 126.60	3; 189.61
