= 2021–22 Grand Prix of Figure Skating Final =

Cancelled international figure skating competition

2021–22 Grand Prix Final
- Type: Grand Prix competition
- Season: 2021–22
- Location: Osaka, Japan
- Host: Japan Skating Federation
- Venue: Towa Pharmaceutical Ractab Dome
- Previous: 2019–20 Grand Prix Final
- Next: 2022–23 Grand Prix Final
- Previous Grand Prix: 2021 Rostelecom Cup

The 2021–22 Grand Prix of Figure Skating Final was a figure skating competition sanctioned by the International Skating Union (ISU), originally scheduled to be hosted by the Japan Skating Federation, and would have been the final event of the 2021–22 ISU Grand Prix of Figure Skating series. It would have been held concurrently with the 2021–22 Junior Grand Prix of Figure Skating Final at the Towa Pharmaceutical Ractab Dome in Osaka, Japan, from December 9 to 12, 2021. Medals would have been awarded in men's singles, women's singles, pair skating, and ice dance at the senior and junior levels. However, the competition was cancelled due to travel restrictions imposed by Japan in response to the discovery of the SARS-CoV-2 Omicron variant.

== Background ==
The ISU Grand Prix of Figure Skating is a series of seven events sanctioned by the International Skating Union (ISU) and held during the autumn: six qualifying events and the Grand Prix of Figure Skating Final. This allows skaters to perfect their programs earlier in the season, as well as compete against the skaters with whom they will later compete at the World Championships. Skaters earn points based on their results in their respective competitions, and the top skaters or teams in each discipline are invited to compete at the Grand Prix Final. Likewise, the ISU Junior Grand Prix of Figure Skating (JGP) is a series of seven international figure skating competitions exclusively for junior-level skaters. The locations of the Junior Grand Prix events change every year. Skaters earn points based on their results each season, and the top skaters or teams in each discipline are then invited to compete at the Junior Grand Prix of Figure Skating Final.

Due to varying travel and quarantine restrictions during the COVID-19 pandemic, several countries had logistical issues gaining access to certain competitions at both the Junior Grand Prix and Grand Prix series. For example, Russian skaters were unable to enter France for the first two stages of the JGP series and struggled to obtain visas for the 2021 Skate America. For the Junior Grand Prix series, the ISU implemented a re-allocation process for countries who had lost quota spots due to being unable to travel to certain countries and compete. Additionally, the ISU decided not to implement a JGP ranking for the season and to instead prioritize holding the JGP series safely "with the best possible participation" in light of the pandemic. On September 1, 2021, the Japan Skating Federation announced that it had chosen to forego the JGP series entirely, despite originally planning to skip just the first three events, due to pandemic-related travel restrictions and the mandatory quarantine period for skaters upon return to Japan. As a result, Japan would have had no competitors at the Junior Grand Prix Final before being awarded wild card berths in men's and women's singles.

On November 29, 2021, in response to the discovery of the SARS-CoV-2 Omicron variant, the Japanese government announced travel restrictions that prevented foreigners from entering Japan beginning the next day. The Japan Skating Federation announced that it would implement a bubble environment – that is, in a cluster made up exclusively of individuals who have been thoroughly tested and unlikely to spread infection – at the 2021 Grand Prix Final in Osaka, as the federation "[proceeded] with preparations while taking infection control measures in line with the government's policy." On December 2, the ISU announced that the event had been cancelled for the month of December due to the "complicated epidemic situation". The ISU left open the possibility for postponement until the end of the season, but did not announce a post-season date or location for any rescheduled event. Unable to find a replacement host, the ISU ultimately cancelled the event on December 17.

== Qualifiers ==
=== Senior qualifiers ===
The following skaters and teams originally qualified to compete at the 2021–22 Grand Prix of Figure Skating Final.

Grand Prix qualifiers
| No. | Men | Women | Pairs | Ice dance |
|---|---|---|---|---|
| 1 | (Japan) Yuma Kagiyama | (Russia) Kamila Valieva | (Russia); Anastasia Mishina; Aleksandr Galliamov | (France); Gabriella Papadakis; Guillaume Cizeron |
| 2 | (Japan) Shoma Uno | (Russia) Anna Shcherbakova | (China); Sui Wenjing; Han Cong | (Russia); Victoria Sinitsina; Nikita Katsalapov |
| 3 | (United States) Vincent Zhou | (Russia) Elizaveta Tuktamysheva | (Russia); Evgenia Tarasova; Vladimir Morozov | (United States); Madison Hubbell; Zachary Donohue |
| 4 | (United States) Nathan Chen | (Japan) Kaori Sakamoto | (Russia); Aleksandra Boikova; Dmitrii Kozlovskii | (Canada); Piper Gilles; Paul Poirier |
| 5 | (Russia) Mikhail Kolyada | (Russia) Maiia Khromykh | (Russia); Daria Pavliuchenko; Denis Khodykin | (United States); Madison Chock; Evan Bates |
| 6 | (United States) Jason Brown | (Russia) Alena Kostornaia | (Japan); Riku Miura; Ryuichi Kihara | (Italy); Charlène Guignard; Marco Fabbri |

Alternates

Grand Prix alternates
| No. | Men | Women | Pairs | Ice dance |
|---|---|---|---|---|
| 1 | (Japan) Shun Sato | (South Korea) You Young | (Russia); Iuliia Artemeva; Mikhail Nazarychev | (Russia); Alexandra Stepanova; Ivan Bukin |
| 2 | (Georgia (country)) Morisi Kvitelashvili | (Belgium) Loena Hendrickx | (United States); Alexa Knierim; Brandon Frazier | (Canada); Laurence Fournier Beaudry; Nikolaj Sørensen |
| 3 | (South Korea) Cha Jun-hwan | (Japan) Mai Mihara | (United States); Ashley Cain-Gribble; Timothy LeDuc | (Spain); Olivia Smart; Adrián Díaz |

=== Junior qualifiers ===
The following skaters and teams originally qualified to compete at the 2021–22 Junior Grand Prix of Figure Skating Final.

Junior Grand Prix qualifiers
| No. | Men | Women | Pairs | Ice dance |
|---|---|---|---|---|
| 1 | (United States) Ilia Malinin | (Russia) Sofia Akateva | (Russia); Ekaterina Chikmareva; Matvei Ianchenkov | (Russia); Irina Khavronina; Dario Cirisano |
| 2 | (Russia) Ilya Yablokov | (Russia) Veronika Zhilina | (Russia); Natalia Khabibullina; Ilya Knyazhuk | (Russia); Vasilisa Kaganovskaia; Valeriy Angelopol |
| 3 | (Russia) Gleb Lutfullin | (Russia) Sofia Muravieva | (Russia); Anastasia Mukhortova; Dmitry Evgenyev | (United States); Katarina Wolfkostin; Jeffrey Chen |
| 4 | (Russia) Kirill Sarnovskiy | (Russia) Adeliia Petrosian | (Russia); Ekaterina Petushkova; Evgenii Malikov | (Canada); Natalie D'Alessandro; Bruce Waddell |
| 5 | (Canada) Wesley Chiu | (United States) ~~Isabeau Levito~~ (withdrew) | —N/a | (Russia); Sofya Tyutyunina; Alexander Shustitskiy |
| 6 | (Russia) Egor Rukhin | (United States) Lindsay Thorngren | —N/a | (United States); Oona Brown; Gage Brown |
| Wild Cards | (Japan) Lucas Tsuyoshi Honda | (Japan) Rion Sumiyoshi | —N/a | —N/a |

Alternates

Junior Grand Prix alternates
| No. | Men | Women | Pairs | Ice dance |
|---|---|---|---|---|
| 1 | (Russia) Artem Kovalev | (Russia) Anastasia Zinina | (Georgia (country)); Karina Safina; Luka Berulava | (Russia); Sofia Leonteva; Daniil Gorelkin |
| 2 | (Kazakhstan) Mikhail Shaidorov | (Russia) Sofia Samodelkina | (Russia); Polina Kostiukovich; Aleksei Briukhanov | (United States); Isabella Flores; Dimitry Tsarevski |
| 3 | (Estonia) Arlet Levandi | (South Korea) Kim Chae-yeon | (Russia); Ekaterina Storublevtseva; Artem Gritsaenko | (Canada); Miku Makita; Tyler Gunara |
