= Anna Frolova =

Russian figure skater (born 2005)

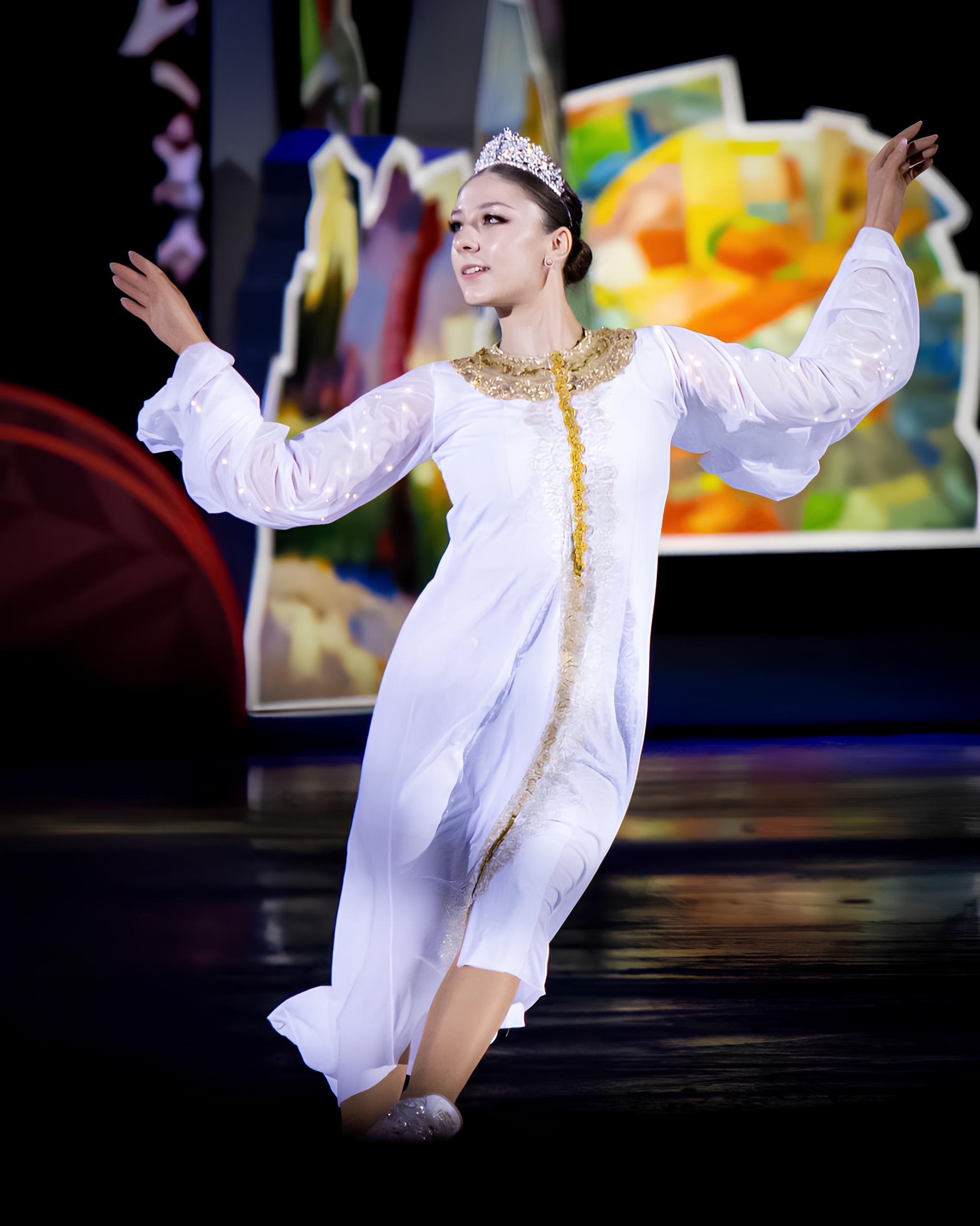
- Frolova in 2024

Personal information
- Native name: Анна Сергеевна Фролова
- Full name: Anna Sergeevna Frolova
- Born: 7 August 2005 (age 21) Mytischi, Russia
- Home town: Saint Petersburg, Russia
- Height: 1.66 m (5 ft 5 1/2 in)

Figure skating career
- Country: (Individual Neutral Athletes) Individual Neutral Athlete; Russia
- Coach: Evgeni Rukavicin
- Skating club: Sports School of Olympic Reserve of Saint Petersburg
- Began skating: 2010
Medal record
Representing Russia
Figure skating: Ladies' singles
Winter Youth Olympics
Bronze medal – third place	2020 Lausanne	Ladies' singles

Anna Sergeevna Frolova (Russian: Анна Сергеевна Фролова; born 7 August 2005) is a Russian figure skater who currently competes as an Individual Neutral Athlete. On the junior level, she is the 2020 Winter Youth Olympic bronze medalist, the 2019 JGP Italy silver medalist, and the 2019 JGP Croatia bronze medalist. On the senior level she is the 2026 CS Trialeti Trophy bronze medalist, as well as the 2026 CS Kinoshita Cup bronze medalist.

== Personal life ==
Anna Frolova was born on 7 August 2005 in Mytishchi, Russia.

== Career ==
=== Early years ===
Frolova began learning how to skate in 2010 at the age of five. Her first figure skating coach was Irina Strakhova. At the age of eleven, she began training under Svetlana Panova at SSh “Snezhnye Barsy” in Moscow.

=== 2019–20 season: Junior international debut and Winter Youth Olympics bronze medal ===
Frolova began her season by making her international debut on the Junior Grand Prix series, winning the bronze medal at 2019 JGP Croatia behind Lee Hae-in and Daria Usacheva. Following the withdrawal of Alena Kanysheva, Frolova was also assigned to compete at 2019 JGP Italy, winning the silver medal behind training mate, Ksenia Sinitsyna. With these results, Frolova was named as the first alternate for the 2019–20 Junior Grand Prix Final.

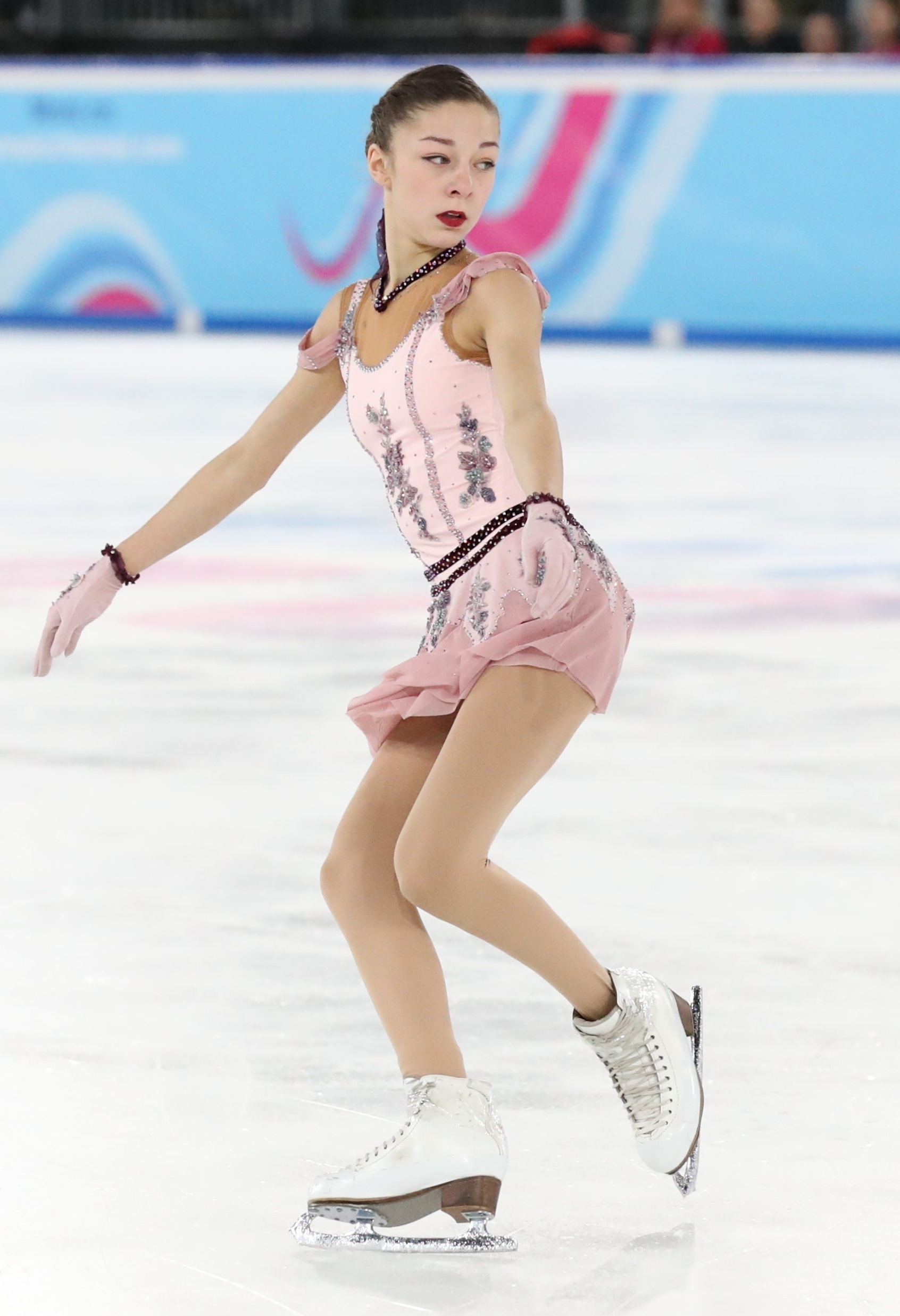
Frolova at the 2020 Winter Youth Olympics

In December, Frolova competed at the 2020 Russian Championships, placing seventh in the short program and fifth in the free skate to climb to sixth place overall. Prior to the event, Frolova transferred to the CSKA Moscow where Sergei Davydov became her new coach.

As the first alternate, she was called up to compete at the 2020 Winter Youth Olympics in Lausanne, Switzerland following the withdrawal of Viktoria Vasilieva. In the girls' singles event, Frolova placed third in the short program and fourth in the free skate to win the bronze medal overall behind You Young and Kseniia Sinitsyna. She was also selected to compete in the team event for Team Future, composed of Frolova, men's single skater Matteo Nalbone of Italy, Chinese pair team Wang/Huang, and Ukrainian ice dance team Cherniavska/Muratov for the mixed-NOC team trophy. Frolova finished second in the ladies event and the team placed seventh overall.

=== 2020–21 season ===
Due to the COVID-19 pandemic, the 2020–21 Junior Grand Prix series was cancelled. Frolova thus started her season by competing domestically on the Cup of Russia series, winning silver at 2021 Russian Cup Stage I, Syzran and finishing fourth at 2021 Russian Cup Stage II, Moscow.

In December, at the 2021 Russian Championships, Frolova finished in eleventh place. A couple weeks later, she competed at the 2021 Russian Junior Championships.

Frolova subsequently finished her season with a fifth-place finish at the 2021 Russian Cup Final.

=== 2021–2022 season: Injury ===
Frolova did not compete during the 2021–22 season due to a stress fracture in her foot. “I had a number of stress fractures in my foot. I felt completely helpless" said Frolova. Due to her injury, Frolova was excluded from Olympic team contention.

In early March, the ISU banned all figure skaters and officials representing Russia and Belarus from attending the World Championships and international competitions due to the Russian invasion of Ukraine in late February.

=== 2022–2023 season: Return to competition ===
Frolova made her return to competition on the Russian Grand Prix series, finishing fourth at 2022 Russian Grand Prix V, Samara and sixth at 2022 Russian Grand Prix VI, Perm.

In December, she finished twelfth at the 2022 Russian Championships. Three months later, Frolova closed her season by finishing tenth at the 2023 Russian Grand Prix Final.

=== 2023–2024 season: Russian Grand Prix Final silver medal ===
During the off-season, Frolova made the decision to move to Saint Petersburg and train at SShOR under Evgeni Rukavicin. She cited that the reason behind her decision was the desire to train in an environment with other young adult women's singles skaters like herself.

Frolova started her season by winning silver at 2023 Russian Grand Prix I, Ufa and winning gold at 2023 Russian Grand Prix III, Krasnoyarsk. In December, she finished fifth at the 2024 Russian Championships.

Two months later, Frolova closed her season by winning the silver medal behind Adeliia Petrosian at the 2024 Russian Grand Prix Final.

=== 2024–2025 season: Russian Grand Prix Final bronze medal ===
Frolova began her season by winning the gold at both her assigned Russian Grand Prix assignments, 2024 Russian Grand Prix I, Magnitogorsk and 2024 Russian Grand Prix III, Krasnoyarsk.

In December, she finished sixth at the 2025 Russian Championships after placing third in the short program and sixth in the free skate. Frolova then finished her season by winning bronze at the 2025 Russian Grand Prix Final behind Adeliia Petrosian and Alina Gorbacheva.

=== 2025–2026 season ===
Frolova started the season by competing on the Russian Grand Prix series, winning silver at 2025 Russian Grand Prix I, Magnitogorsk and bronze at 2025 Russian Grand Prix III, Kazan. She then went on to compete at the 2026 Russian Championships where she placed third in the short program and seventh in the free skate to finish in fourth place overall.

In March, Frolova concluded her season with a sixth-place finish at the 2026 Russian Grand Prix Final.

=== 2026–2027 season ===
On 30 June 2026, the International Skating Union announced that figure skaters from Russia and Belarus would be allowed to compete at international competitions as Individual Neutral Athletes (AINs). Each of these skaters are required to undergo an individual assessment conducted by the ISU Council to determine whether they meet the criteria for neutral status. Frolova's application was approved, making her eligible to compete internationally as a neutral athlete.

Frolova opened her season by competing at the 2026 Kinoshita Group Cup, winning the bronze medal behind Alexandra Trusova and Mao Shimada. Frolova followed this by winning bronze at the 2026 Trialeti Trophy. She experienced some jumping errors in her free skate and expressed slight disappointment; "To be honest, today I completely ruined everything I might have worked for over the past three years. It's very upsetting and shameful that I let down the people who worked with me, who believed in me, and that I let myself down too. Everyone is used to me skating cleanly. I hoped that this tournament would be no exception."

== Programs ==
Season	Short program	Free skating	Exhibition
2026–2027	Be Italian (from "Nine") by Fergie	Hymn to the Sea (from "Titanic" soundtrack); An Irish Party in Third Class (from "Titanic" soundtrack) by James Horner; My Heart Will Go On (Love Theme from "Titanic" soundtrack) by Céline Dion, Walter Afanasieff	
2025–2026	Love Like a Dream by Mariam Merabova choreo. by Valentin Molotov	Cats by Andrew Lloyd Webber; Macavity performed by Taylor Swift; Memory performed by Jennifer Hudson & Geek Music choreo. by Valentin Molotov; Miracle (Sarah's Version) by Yoshiki & Sarah Brightman choreo. by Anna Novichkina	Nocture 'La Séparation(Разлука) in F Minor by Mikhail Glinka performed by "Concertino" Soloists Ensemble of the Moscow State Philharmonic, Viktor Kozodov, & Dmitry Shvedov; A Million Voices by Polina Gagarina
2024–2025	T'es où by Camille Lellouche	Cats by Andrew Lloyd Webber; Macavity performed by Taylor Swift; Memory performed by Jennifer Hudson & Geek Music choreo. by Valentin Molotov	Лютики (Buttercups) by Prosto Lera choreo. by Valentin Molotov & Olga Glinka
2023–2024	I'm Not There by Sevara Nazarkhan	Tango by Mgzavrebi	
2022–2023	Shahmaran by Sevdaliza choreo. by Viktoria Bondarenko	Tango by Mgzavrebi; Following a Bird "Out of the Room" (Unconditioned) by Ezio Bosso choreo. by Viktoria Bondarenko	
2021–2022	Shahmaran by Sevdaliza choreo. by Viktoria Bondarenko	Following a Bird "Out of the Room" (Unconditioned) by Ezio Bosso choreo. by Viktoria Bondarenko	
2020–2021	Mathilde and the Balloon Ride (from Mathilde) by Marco Beltrami choreo. by Viktoria Bondarenko & Sergey Verbillo	Following a Bird "Out of the Room" (Unconditioned) by Ezio Bosso choreo. by Viktoria Bondarenko	
2019–2020	Mathilde and the Balloon Ride (from Mathilde) by Marco Beltrami choreo. by Viktoria Bondarenko & Sergey Verbillo	Notre-Dame de Paris by Riccardo Cocciante; Le Temps des cathédrales performed by I Fiamminghi & Rudolf Werthen; Ave Maria païen performed by Hiba Tawaji; Les sans-papiers performed by I Fiamminghi & Rudolf Werthen choreo. by Anna Novichkina & Elena Romanovskaia	
2018–2019	Agony Suite: III. Tango by Alfred Schnittke performed by Rundfunk-Sinfonieorchester Berlin & Frank Strobel	Notre-Dame de Paris by Riccardo Cocciante; Le Temps des cathédrales performed by I Fiamminghi & Rudolf Werthen; Ave Maria païen performed by Hiba Tawaji; Les sans-papiers performed by I Fiamminghi & Rudolf Werthen choreo. by Anna Novichkina & Elena Romanovskaia	
2017–2018	Agony Suite: III. Tango by Alfred Schnittke performed by Rundfunk-Sinfonieorchester Berlin & Frank Strobel	Beauty and the Beast; Overture by Alan Menken; Beauty and the Beast performed by Emma Thompson; Beauty and the Beast (Finale) performed by Audra McDonald & Emma Thompson	

== Competitive highlights ==
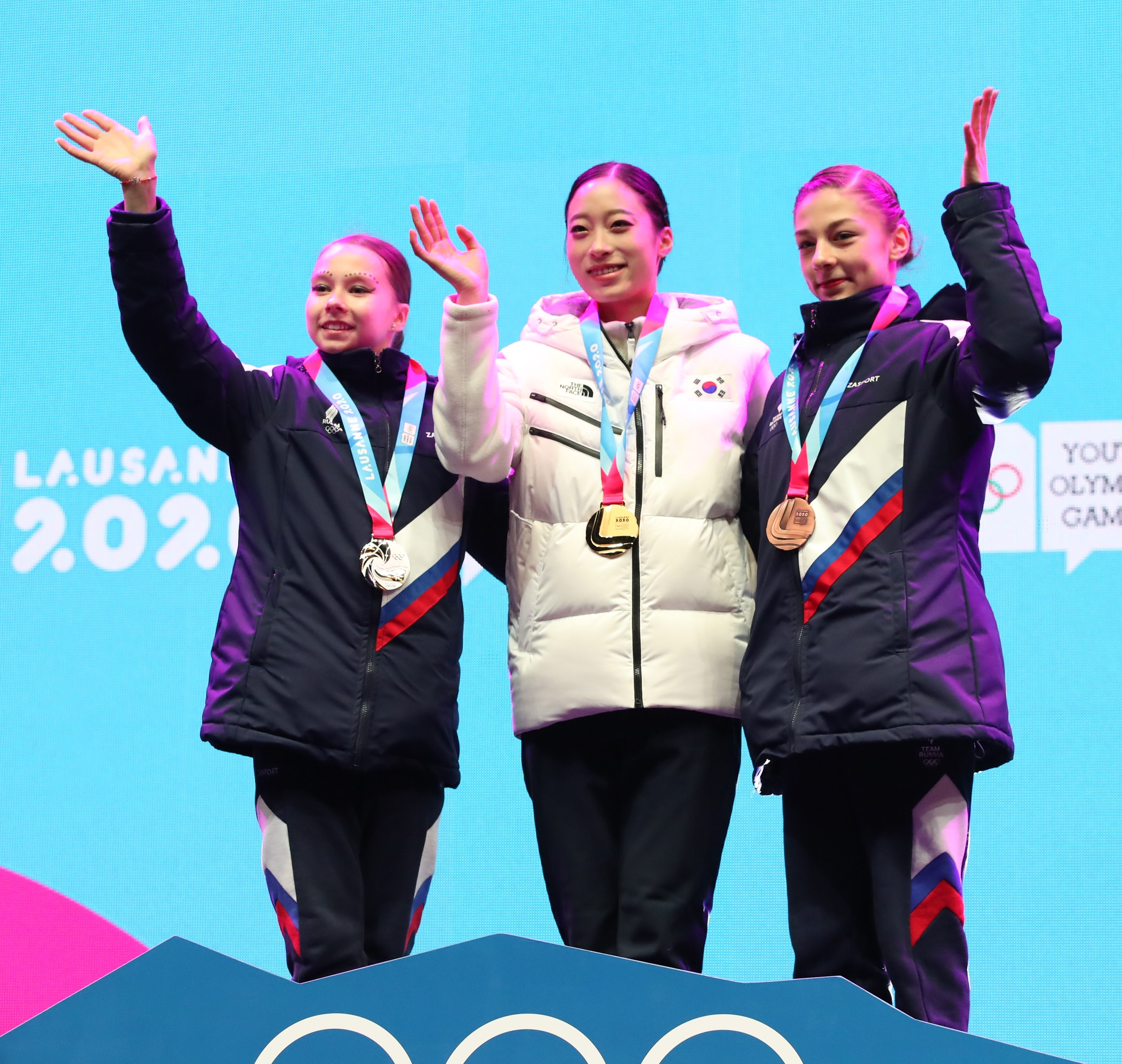
Frolova (right) alongside Kseniia Sinitsyna (left) and Young You (centre) at the 2020 Winter Youth Olympics medal ceremony

- JGP – Event of the ISU Junior Grand Prix Series
- TBD – Placement to be decided

=== Skating as an Individual Neutral Athlete ===
Competition placements at senior level
Season	2026–27
CS Kinoshita Group Cup	3rd
CS Trialeti Trophy	3rd

=== Skating for Russia ===
Competition placements at senior level
Season	2019–20	2020–21	2022–23	2023–24	2024–25	2025–26	2026–27
Russian Championships	6th	11th	12th	4th	6th	4th	
Russian Grand Prix Final (Note: The 2023 Russian Cup Final was renamed as the 2023 Russian Grand Prix Final.)	7th	5th	10th	2nd	3rd	6th	
Russian GP Stage 1 (Note: In 2022, the Russian Cup Stages were renamed to Russian Grand Prix Stages.)		2nd		2nd	1st	2nd	2nd
Russian GP Stage 2		4th					
Russian GP Stage 3				1st	1st	3rd	
Russian GP Stage 4	2nd						
Russian GP Stage 5	4th		4th				
Russian GP Stage 6			6th				

Competition placements at junior level
Season	2018–19	2019–20	2020–21
Winter Youth Olympics		3rd	
Winter Youth Olympics (Team event)		7th	
Russian Championships	9th	8th	6th
JGP Croatia			3rd
JGP Italy			2nd
Russian Cup Final	3rd		
Russian Cup Stage 1	4th		
Russian Cup Stage 4	2nd		

== Detailed results ==
Small medals for short and free programs awarded only at ISU Championships.

ISU personal best scores in the +5/-5 GOE System
Segment	Type	Score	Event
Total	TSS	207.86	2026 Kinoshita Group Cup
Short program	TSS	73.66	2026 Kinoshita Group Cup
Short program	TES	40.94	2026 Kinoshita Group Cup
Short program	PCS	32.72	2026 Kinoshita Group Cup
Free skating	TSS	134.20	2026 Kinoshita Group Cup
Free skating	TES	68.65	2026 Kinoshita Group Cup
Free skating	PCS	65.55	2026 Kinoshita Group Cup

=== Skating as an Individual Neutral Athlete ===
Results in the 2026–27 season
Date	Event	SP		FS		Total	
Date	Event	P	Score	P	Score	P	Score
Sept 4–6, 2026	(Japan) 2026 Kinoshita Group Cup	5	73.66	3	134.20	3	207.86
Oct 1–4, 2026	(Georgia (country)) 2026 CS Trialeti Trophy	2	73.31	3	129.90	3	203.21

=== Skating for Russia ===
Results in the 2019–20 season
Date	Event	SP		FS		Total	
Date	Event	P	Score	P	Score	P	Score
11–15 Nov 2019	(Russia) 2019 Russian Cup Stage IV, Kazan	1	66.69	2	126.92	2	193.61
20–24 Nov 2019	(Russia) 2019 Russian Cup Stage V, Moscow	2	69.16	4	114.36	4	183.52
24–29 Dec 2019	(Russia) 2020 Russian Championships	7	66.45	5	132.84	6	199.29
18–22 Feb 2020	(Russia) 2020 Russian Cup Final	7	60.01	7	113.37	7	173.38

Results in the 2020–21 season
Date	Event	SP		FS		Total	
Date	Event	P	Score	P	Score	P	Score
18–22 Sep 2020	(Russia) 2020 Russian Cup Stage I, Sysran	3	68.19	2	137.82	2	206.01
10–13 Oct 2020	(Russia) 2020 Russian Cup Stage II, Moscow	4	68.76	4	133.16	4	201.92
23–27 Dec 2020	(Russia) 2021 Russian Championships	16	53.70	8	133.43	11	187.13
26 Feb – 2 Mar 2021	(Russia) 2021 Russian Cup Final	5	71.46	5	142.45	5	213.91

Results in the 2022–23 season
Date	Event	SP		FS		Total	
Date	Event	P	Score	P	Score	P	Score
18–21 Nov 2022	(Russia) 2022 Russian Grand Prix V, Samara	2	70.74	4	123.25	4	193.99
28–30 Nov 2022	(Russia) 2022 Russian Grand Prix VI, Perm	8	58.86	5	124.74	6	183.60
20–26 Dec 2022	(Russia) 2023 Russian Championships	11	67.84	12	126.88	12	194.72
3–5 Mar 2023	(Russia) 2023 Russian Grand Prix Final	10	68.58	9	132.81	10	201.39

Results in the 2023–24 season
Date	Event	SP		FS		Total	
Date	Event	P	Score	P	Score	P	Score
13–16 Oct 2023	(Russia) 2023 Russian Grand Prix I, Ufa	2	73.39	2	137.49	2	210.88
28–29 Oct 2023	(Russia) 2023 Russian Grand Prix III, Krasnoyarsk	2	70.75	1	144.80	1	215.55
20–24 Dec 2023	(Russia) 2024 Russian Championships	6	73.52	6	145.95	5	219.47
14–19 Feb 2024	(Russia) 2024 Russian Grand Prix Final	2	76.55	2	149.43	2	225.98

Results in the 2024–25 season
Date	Event	SP		FS		Total	
Date	Event	P	Score	P	Score	P	Score
25–28 Oct 2024	(Russia) 2024 Russian Grand Prix I, Magnitogorsk	1	77.33	1	149.00	1	226.33
8–11 Nov 2024	(Russia) 2024 Russian Grand Prix III, Krasnoyarsk	1	74.68	2	144.23	1	218.91
18–23 Dec 2024	(Russia) 2025 Russian Championships	3	75.01	5	146.80	6	221.81
13–17 Feb 2025	(Russia) 2025 Russian Grand Prix Final	4	74.89	3	147.00	3	221.89

Results in the 2025–26 season
Date	Event	SP		FS		Total	
Date	Event	P	Score	P	Score	P	Score
24–27 Oct 2025	(Russia) 2025 Russian Grand Prix I, Magnitogorsk	2	72.74	6	133.84	2	206.58
7–10 Nov 2025	(Russia) 2025 Russian Grand Prix III, Kazan	4	72.17	4	129.92	3	202.09
18–21 Dec 2025	(Russia) 2026 Russian Championships	3	73.93	7	143.74	4	217.67
6–9 Mar 2026	(Russia) 2026 Russian Grand Prix Final	9	64.43	2	139.96	6	204.39

Results in the 2026–27 season
Date	Event	SP		FS		Total	
Date	Event	P	Score	P	Score	P	Score
16–19 October, 2026	(Russia) 2026 Russian Grand Prix I, Kazan	1	74.70	3	133.62	2	208.32

=== Junior level ===
Results in the 2018–19 season
Date	Event	SP		FS		Total	
Date	Event	P	Score	P	Score	P	Score
14–18 Sep 2018	(Russia) 2018 Russian Cup Stage I, Sysran	6	58.13	2	129.55	4	187.68
6–10 Nov 2018	(Russia) 2018 Russian Cup Stage IV, Kazan	1	67.20	2	133.89	2	201.09
31 Jan – 4 Feb 2019	(Russia) 2019 Russian Junior Championships	10	65.66	10	120.47	9	186.13
18–22 Feb 2019	(Russia) 2019 Russian Cup Final	3	65.07	3	124.31	3	189.38

Results in the 2019–20 season
Date	Event	SP		FS		Total	
Date	Event	P	Score	P	Score	P	Score
25–28 Sep 2019	(Croatia) 2019 JGP Slovakia	3	67.93	3	114.03	3	181.96
2–5 Oct 2019	2019 JGP Italy	2	61.43	4	114.78	2	176.21
10–15 Jan 2020	(Switzerland) 2020 Winter Youth Olympics	3	69.07	4	118.65	3	187.72
Jan 15 2020	(Switzerland) 2020 Winter Youth Olympics (Team event)	—N/a	—N/a	2	126.00	7	126.00
4–8 Feb 2020	(Russia) 2020 Russian Junior Championships	8	66.27	8	132.67	8	198.94
18–22 Feb 2020	(Russia) 2020 Russian Cup Final	7	60.01	7	113.37	7	173.38

Results in the 2021–22 season
Date	Event	SP		FS		Total	
Date	Event	P	Score	P	Score	P	Score
2–5 Jan 2021	(Russia) 2021 Russian Junior Championships	6	68.10	9	122.44	6	190.54
