= Sergei Rozanov =

Russian musician (1870–1937)

Sergei Vasilievich Rozanov (1870–1937) was a Russian clarinetist and teacher, considered to be the founder of modern Russian clarinet school.

In 1886, he entered Moscow Conservatory, where his teacher was Franz Zimmermann (1818–1891), solo clarinet of Bolshoi theatre. After graduating in 1890, Rozanov began his career as an orchestral musician in different opera theatres of Moscow. In 1894 he was engaged as a second clarinet in Bolshoi theatre, and three years later became the solo clarinet. He kept this place up to 1929. Rozanov also performed frequently as a soloist and chamber musician, he was the first Russian clarinetist to play the quintets of Wolfgang Amadeus Mozart and Johannes Brahms, and also the Trio pathétique by Mikhail Glinka. In 1922-1932 he was a member of Persimfans.

From 1916 Rozanov taught clarinet at the Moscow Conservatory. His pupils include Alexander Volodin, Ivan Mayorov and other clarinetists, who later become professors and laureates of different musical competitions. Rozanov made several transcriptions for clarinet and wrote numerous studies for it.

== Sources ==
- Платонов Н. Из воспоминаний о Сергее Васильевиче Розанове. (Воспоминания о Московской консерватории) — М., 1966.
