= Matvei Vetlugin =

Russian figure skater

- Matvei Vetlugin at the 2022 Russian Grand Prix, 5th Stage. Free skating

Personal information
- Native name: Матвей Рубенович Ветлугин
- Full name: Matvei Rubenovich Vetlugin
- Born: 9 October 2003 (age 23) Moscow, Russia

Figure skating career
- Country: (Individual Neutral Athletes) Individual Neutral Athlete; Russia
- Discipline: Men's singles
- Coach: Evgeni Rukavitsyn
- Skating club: Figure Skating Academy of Evgeni Rukavitsyn, St. Petersburg
- Began skating: 2007

Medal record
- Bronze medal at the 2022 Russian Cup Final in Saransk; Silver medal at the 2026 CS Lombardia Trophy in Bergamo

Matvei Rubenovich Vetlugin (Russian: Матвей Рубенович Ветлугин, born October 9, 2003, in Moscow) — is a Russian figure skater, competing in Men's Single skating. He currently competes as an Individual Neutral Athlete (AIN).

He is the 2022 Russian Cup Final bronze medalist and the 2026 Lombardia Trophy silver medalist. He received the Master of Sports of Russia title in 2018.

== Career ==
=== Early years ===
==== From 2011–2012 season to 2017–2018 season ====
Matvei Vetlugin started to skate in 2007 at the Sport School of Olympic Reserve "Moskvich" in Moscow with Lyudmila Sapronova as his coach.

Vetlugin started his national debut in 2012, during the Championship of Moscow (Younger Age) in the 2011–2012 season. During the 2013–2014 season, he placed second in the Championship of Russia "Zhuk Memorial" (Younger Age) with 186.59 as total score. In the 2014–2015 season, Vetlugin won the gold medal at the Championship of Moscow (Elder Age) 2015, Junior category, with 193.08 as total score. In the same year, during the 2015–2016 season, he won the gold medal at the FFKKM Open Cup 2015 with 186.95 as total score with the ranking of Candidate of Master of Sports.

In 2017, Vetlugin won silver medal at the FFKKM President's Prize Competition, with 216.61 total score and with "Master of Sports" ranking; on July 24, 2018, Vetlugin was awarded the title of "Master of Sport" by the Ministry of Sport of the Russian Federation, a title that is reserved for athletes who "achieve specific performance standards at the national level, roughly comparable to a national champion in other countries' sporting systems".

=== International debut and national competitions ===
==== From 2018–2019 season to 2020–2021 season ====
In 2018, Vetlugin made his international debut at the ISU Junior Grand Prix Canada, in Richmond, classifying in sixth place as final result. In the same 2018–2019 season, he won silver medal at the All-Russian Championship "Hope of Russia" 2019, Junior category, with 224.98 as final score.

The following season, Vetlugin participated at the ISU Junior Grand Prix Lake Placid (US) 2019, where he classified in tenth place. In a 2019 interview, Sapronova said that "Matvei has a beautiful skating. Sometimes in practice he skates in a way that twists your soul. He can do that. We want to combine that kind of skating with a technical program".

Continuing his skating career with Sapronova, Vetlugin reached good national results during the 2020–2021 season. In the Junior category, he won gold medal at the 2nd Stage of the 2020 Cup of Russia and at the 3rd Stage of the 2020 Cup of Russia, respectively with 228.78 and 230.43 as final scores. However, he had to withdraw from the second half of the season due to a relapse of a leg injury.

==== 2021–2022 season ====
At the beginning of 2021, Vetlugin matured an important decision in his career: he left the "Moskvich" Sport School to move into the training group of Alexei Mishin in Saint Petersburg. At that time, Mishin was also coaching Mikhail Kolyada, Evgeni Semenenko, Gleb Lutfullin, Andrei Lazukin. Training with Mishin and strengthening his technique, Vetlugin built new approaches to his jumps, and this process took several months of work. In September, Vetlugin won silver medal at the 1st Stage of the 2021 Saint Petersburg Cup with 209.61 final scores, and in October he won bronze medal at the 2nd Stage of the 2021 Saint Petersburg Cup with 228.27 final scores. Other national results, got between October and November, are the seventh place at the 3rd Stage at the Russian Cup 2021 and the second place at the 5th Stage of the Russian Cup 2021. With Mishin, Vetlugin further improved his skating while still dealing with the past injury: the most important result in the 2021–2022 season is the bronze medal at the 2022 Cup of Russia Final in Saransk, with 232.20 total scores. At the end of the season, Vetlugin place first winning the gold medal at the 2022 Saint Petersburg Championship with 260.57 final scores.

==== 2022–2023 season ====
During the off-season in summer, Vetlugin had to undergo to an ankle surgery after dealing with the injury for a long time. The recovery has not been easy but the skater had no intention to withdraw from the season, so he managed to train still in hard conditions, and in November he finally participated at the Rostelecom Russian Grand Prix – Volga Pirouette in Samara where, nevertheless, he placed in fifth position with 245.60 final scores, a surprising result that Vetlugin would have never expected to achieve. Just a few days after the event, Vetlugin took part at the Rostelecom Russian Grand Prix "For the Prizes of the Governor of Perm Krai" in Perm, where he classified in sixth place with 232.83 final scores. In December of the same year (2022), Vetlugin participated at the 2023 Russian Championship in Krasnoyarsk: in the short program, he successfully landed his first clean quadruple Toeloop after the surgery, classifying in fourth place with 97.58 scores, while he then placed in tenth place with 237.00 scores as final result due to some mistakes during the free skating. In the following competitions, Vetlugin had ups and downs, like the fourth place with 276.55 final scores at the 2023 Saint Petersburg Championship held in January, and the eleventh place at the 2023 Russian Grand Prix Final in Saint Petersburg held in March.

==== 2023–2024 season ====
Vetlugin continued his training with Mishin and prepared his first preseason camp in Kislovodsk. The most important result of the new season is the gold medal at the 2nd Stage of the 2023 Russian Grand Prix held in Omsk. The short program was well performed and he placed first with 94.16 scores; in the free skating, besides some mistakes, Vetlugin got second place, behind Alexey Erokhov, with 176.61 scores, but the final scores placed him in first place since he received 270.87 scores overall. In the 6th Stage of the 2023 Russian Grand Prix, held in Moscow in November, Vetlugin classified in fifth place with 251.71 final scores. In December 2023, during the 2024 Russian Championship in Chelyabinsk, the performances did not go as imagined and he placed in fourteenth position.

A better result emerged in January from the Saint Petersburg Championship 2024 where he placed fourth, behind Makar Ignatov (bronze medal), Gleb Lutfullin (silver medal) and Petr Gumennik (gold medal), with 261.91, just two points behind Ignatov. From 16th to 17 February, Vetlugin participated at the All-Russian Spartakiad of the Strongest Athletes 2024, a very important sport event that has been compared to the 2026 Winter Olympics programs that involved many other winter disciplines and more than 27.000 tickets were sold only for the figure skating events. Figure skating competitions were held in Magnitogorsk. In that event, Vetlugin underlined the responsibility of participating, since it represented an opportunity to make people and children fall in love with figure skating. Vetlugin classified in sixth place with 96.07 scores at the short program and in tenth place with 226.04 scores overall. In the team event of the Channel One Trophy 2024, held in Saint Petersburg at the end of the season, he participated for the Red Team that placed second.

==== 2024–2025 season ====
During the off-season, a new important step in Vetlugin's career took place with his departure from Alexei Mishin and his staff, a long-considered decision, to get further improvements. He left the coach to move into the Figure Skating Academy of Evgeni Rukavitsyn with Olga Glinka and Valentin Molotov as his choreographers, who are currently his coaches. Vetlugin and the new coaches immediately found common ground and good communication. Other skaters in the Academy of Rukavitsyn include also Dmitri Aliev and Artur Danielyan.

Despite some new inconveniences in September related to the past injury, an immediate, good result emerged in November 2024, when Vetlugin won bronze medal at the 2nd Stage of the Russian Grand Prix in Kazan, with 255.18 final scores. In the free skating, the opening quadruple Lutz received +3.68 GOE, but he fell on the second quadruple of the program, the Flip. However, the scores of the free skating were 169.56 despite the negative deduction. At the beginning of the season, though, Vetlugin said that his past injury was still there and limited the amount of work and training. Nevertheless, he still managed to compete: the beginning of the season was also marked by other results, like the fifth place at the 4th Stage of the Russian Grand Prix in Moscow and the twelfth place at the 2025 Russian Championship held in December 2024, in Omsk. At the 2025 Saint Petersburg Championship, in February, he won the silver medal with brilliant performances scored 293.50 overall, the highest scores recorded in Vetlugin's career so far, and he placed at just two points from Gumennik, who won the gold medal at the event with 295.64 total scores. In the short program, where he placed second with 103.27 scores, he recorded his highest score for a short program with 46.76 components scores. Vetlugin received a very high GOE, +3.91 GOE, for his opening quadruple Lutz, recording 15.41 scores for this jump. In the free skating that featured three quadruples and summarized 190.23 scores, 93.75 of which were for the components, the GOE for the Lutz was the same as in the short program; the quadruple Loop instead received +3.57 GOE on a base value of 10.50 scores.

==== 2025–2026 season ====
Continuing his fruitful collaboration with Rukavitsyn, in September Vetlugin opened the season with the gold medal at the 2nd Stage of the 2025 Saint Petersburg Cup with 246.74 final scores. In October, the skater placed fifth at the N.A. Panin Memorial 2025 in Saint Petersburg with 234.31 scores overall. In the Russian Grand Prix 2025, Vetlugin participated at the 2nd Stage in Kransoyarsk where he placed in eighth position and at the 3rd Stage in Kazan where he classified sixth. Vetlugin won two consecutive gold medals: at the 2025 Saint Petersburg Cup Final in November, winning the event with 259.87 final scores, and at the 2025 World Cup of the Strongest Athletes with 258.30 total scores. Among the other elements, the short program performed at the 2025 Saint Petersburg Cup Final consisted of an opening quadruple Flip, for which he received a +2.86 GOE, a triple Axel and his typical triple Lutz-triple Loop combination. In the free skating, Vetlugin received a +3.36 GOE for his quadruple Loop. In the 2025 World Cup of the Strongest Athletes held in Minsk, where Belorusian athletes were also competing, Vetlugin received 97.75 scores for the short program in which he presented an opening quadruple Flip. These two consecutive gold medals helped the skater achieve more competitive experience.

Vetlugin was then preparing for the most challenging event of the mid-season, the 2026 Russian Championship, that were held in Saint Petersburg in December 2025. On that occasion, Vetlugin classified in fourth place with 273.12 final scores but he made a great, lasting impression on the audience for his clean programs and his artistry. The short program opened with a clean quadruple Flip, with +2.99 GOE, and the performance summarized 92.76 scores and was skated on the music of "How Young We Were" ("Как молоды мы были") by Vladimir Selivanov. The free program received 180.36 scores and featured three quadruples, where the quadruple Loop received +3.15 GOE. This program became memorable and was skated on the music of "God Save the Tsar". Overall, the program was a success and Vetlugin established his personal record in the Russian Championship with 273.12 final scores. The skater later spoke about the challenging season he went through, especially at the time of the Russian Championship, since in the off-season he did not have time to rest due to his preparation for the graduation at the University. However, the season offered also an opportunity for a personal growth, as he stated in an interview.

In February 2026, Vetlugin participated at the Saint Petersburg Championship, where he placed sixth with 242.19 final scores. In the Russian Grand Prix Final, held in Chelyabinsk in March, the skater reached eighth position with 241.70 final scores. He placed tenth in the short program due to mistakes on both the quadruple Flip and the triple Axel, but he gained one position in the free skating, placing eighth as final result. Before the event, Vetlugin stated that he could have withdrawn from the Final, due to an injury occurred just few days before the event, but he decided to participate anyway at the Final. Always in March, Vetlugin took part at the Channel One Trophy 2026, a competition with two contending teams, the Saint Petersburg team, where Vetlugin and Gumennik were listed, and the Moscow team. At the event, the Saint Petersburg team arrived in second place. At the 2026 Russian Challenge Tournament, held in Moscow in April, Vetlugin placed in fifth position with 28.23 scores. On that occasion, the skater conceived and performed a show dedicated to the Russian Paralympian athletes, bringing onto the ice a deep reflection about the life, challenges and overcomings of these athletes, with a positive message of resilience. Vetlugin received for this performance a special award given by Ekaterina Klimova.

==== 2026–2027 season ====
The new season opened with a particularly interesting opportunity for Vetlugin, since this season marked his come back into international competitions, now as a Senior and as an AIN athlete. Vetlugin stated at the beginning of the 2026–2027 season that this year he wants to bring back the programs of the past years at each different competition, as an interesting experiment that no one has ever done before, useful to test the audience's preferences and to figure out what skating style currently fits him better; this completely new experiment also represents a way to outflow the skating routine. The skater highlighted the new experience of being and competing among international athletes, since the last time he participated at an international skating event was at the ISU Junior Grand Prix Lake Placid, US, in 2019. Before competing again with international athletes, Vetlugin expressed that he thought about retirement, but the arisen opportunities emerged from these new competitions gave him new goals and motivation to continue his career.

Vetlugin made a brilliant appearance at the ISU 2026 CS Lombardia Trophy, held in Bergamo, Italy, in September, where he won the silver medal with 254.53 final scores, his new Personal Best. This appearance represents the first one at an international competition in Senior category. With this first appearance at an international competition after a long time, he is currently in 93rd position in the 2026–2027 Men ISU World Standings. The short program was skated on the music of "Libertango" by Astor Piazzolla from the 2023–2024 season and included an opening quadruple Lutz (for which he received a +2.53 GOE), a triple Axel and his iconic triple Lutz-triple Loop combination. The scores for the short program were 90.02. The free skating was performed on the music "Appassionata" by Secret Garden, (a continuation story from the short program performance), also from the 2023–2024 season, for which he received 164.51 scores. The opening quadruple Lutz was valued with a negative GOE because the skater touched the ice with one hand. However, the other two quadruples, the Toeloop and the Flip, were well executed. Overall, the program was cleanly skated.

The following event was the ISU 2026 CS Trialeti Trophy, held in Tbilisi, Georgia, in October, where Vetlugin participated as the substitute of Andrei Mozalev and he placed in fourth position with 219.94 final scores. At this competition, the short program, on the music of "The Age of Heroes" by Balázs Havasi from the 2018–2019 season, was scored 73.96, while at the free skating, performed on the music of "Mozart: L’Opera Rock" by Mikelangelo Loconte and Florent Mothe from the 2017–2018 season, he received 145.98 scores. Competing internationally, the skater gained more appreciation and visibility from the international audiences. Coming back to Russia, Vetlugin participated at the 1st Stage of the Russian Grand Prix held in Kazan, where he placed sixth with 235.98 final scores. The short program, also known as "Pushkin", was skated on the music of "The Second Walz" by Dmitri Shostakovich, for which he placed in fourth position with 89.94 scores. In the free skating, performed on a medley of Marty Robbins, Vetlugin's program was scored 146.04 and classified in sixth position. The skater participated at the 3rd Stage of the Russian Grand Prix in Krasnoyarsk, where he placed fifth in the short program (performed on the music of "Per Te" by Josh Groban from the 2019–2020 season) with 85.78 scores, while at the free skating, performed on the music of "God Save the Tsar" from the 2025–2026 season, he placed eleventh with 192.12 scores overall.

== Skating style ==
Vetlugin, besides having both a solid technique and jumps, has been repeatedly praised for his expressive skating. He is well-known and appreciated especially for his charisma and memorable performances, as well as for his shows. The skater likes to put emphasis on the interpretative side of the performances, and he gives particular importance to the choreographic process in which he is actively involved himself. Vetlugin is considered as one of the most elegant and artistic Russian figure skaters.

== Personal life ==
Vetlugin started to skate at the age of four thanks to his mother since she practiced skating herself for a time when she was a child. Vetlugin's grandfather was the two-time Biathlon World Champion Yuri Pavlovich Kolmakov, that is also why he shows great interest in Biathlon. He has been studying at the Higher Education P.F. Lesgaft National State University in Saint Petersburg since 2022, and he graduated cum laude on 16 July 2025.

Vetlugin, at the beginning of the 2022–2023 season, positively passed an exam to become a data operator in the figure skating judging system. He has been involved in the judging system since 2019, and since 2024 he has been working as a data operator, replay operator and assistant technical specialist in several skating events. Vetlugin shared his opinions on the new possibilities of the AI judging support, an idea originally expressed by the ISU President Kim Jae-youl. The skater is in favor in using the artificial intelligence as a judging support in the competitions, and his opinions come also from a solid background of data operator for which he has been working for more than six years.

Vetlugin expressed the wish to learn to play musical instruments such as violin and piano in the future, alongside singing lessons and also expressed the wish of a possible judging-involved career after his retirement. It has been said more than once that Vetlugin has a particular talent for artistry and acting, and besides being acclaimed on the ice for his expressive skating, he is also well-known and appreciated for his parodies that make him famous off the ice: Vetlugin not only performs parodies of skating stars during skating events or shows, but he also publishes his own parodies of famous people on his social media accounts. The intentions of his parodies are not, as he stated, to offend famous personalities, but to bring enjoyable moments to those who see them. Vetlugin said that he likes an active lifestyle and long walks, alongside exploring new places around the world.
