= Gleb Lutfullin =

Russian figure skater (born 2004)

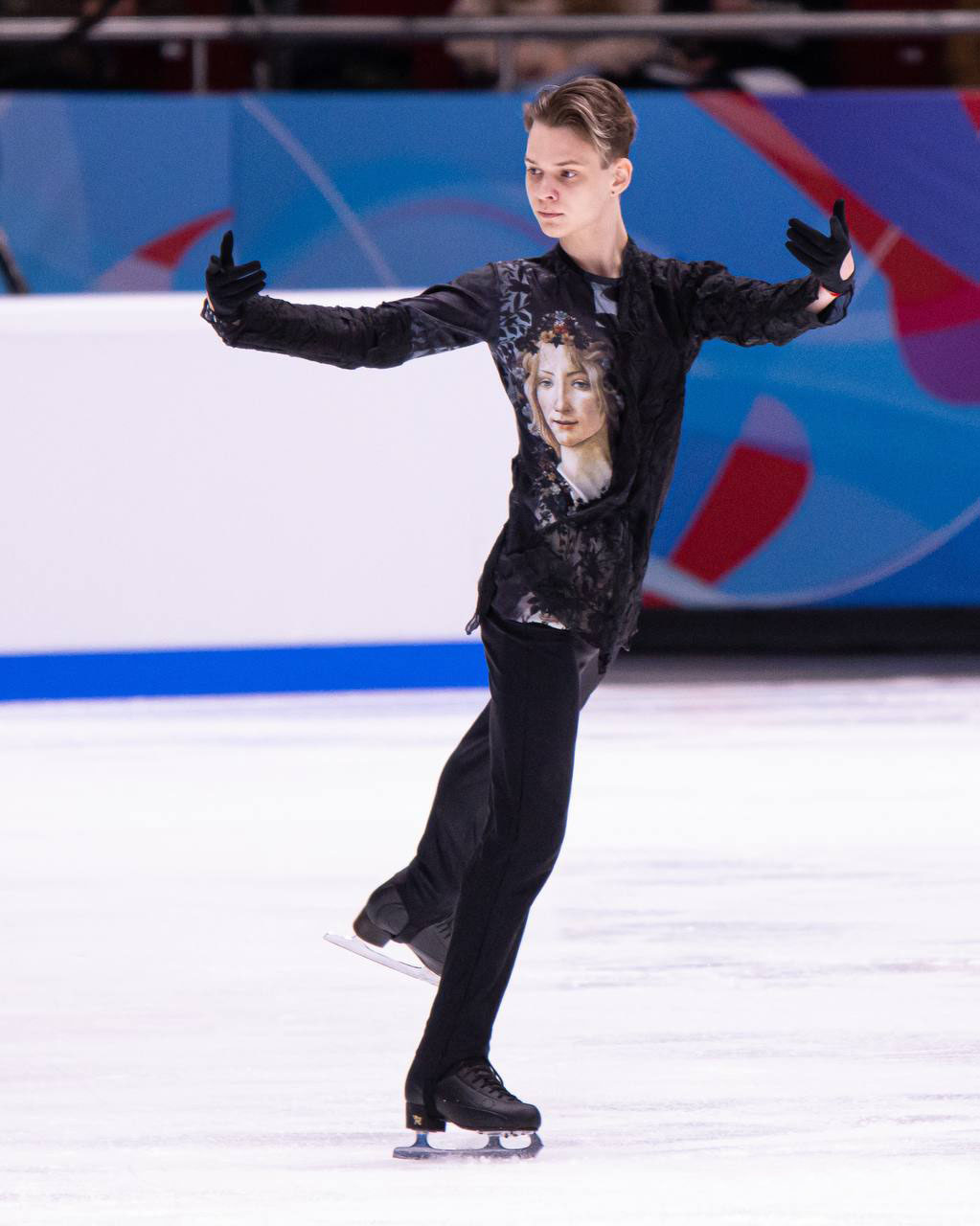
- Gleb Lutfullin in 2024

Personal information
- Native name: Глеб Олегович Лутфуллин
- Full name: Gleb Olegovich Lutfullin
- Born: 31 March 2004 (age 22) Kazan, Russia
- Home town: Saint Petersburg, Russia
- Height: 1.72 m (5 ft 7 1/2 in)

Figure skating career
- Country: (Individual Neutral Athletes) Individual Neutral Athlete; Russia
- Discipline: Men's singles
- Coach: Alexei Mishin; Tatiana Mishina
- Skating club: Zvezdnyi Led St. Petersburg
- Began skating: 2009

Medal record
Russian Championships
Silver medal – second place	2025 Omsk	Singles

Gleb Olegovich Lutfullin (Russian: Глеб Олегович Лутфуллин; born 31 March 2004) is a Russian figure skater who currently competes as an Individual Neutral Athlete. He is the 2025 Russian national silver medalist, the winner of the junior Grand Prix stages in Russia and Poland (2021), and a Master of Sports of Russia (2023).

== Personal life ==
Gleb Lutfullin was born on 31 March 2004 in Kazan, Russia to parents Renata and Oleg. He is the eldest of three brothers.

== Career ==
=== Early career ===
At the age of four, he was enrolled in figure skating lessons so that he could learn to skate and later play hockey. However, he eventually continued with figure skating under the guidance of Elvira Selskova at "Ak Bure" sports school. Later, his coach became Rezeda Sibgatullina.

In 2018, Sibgatullina arranged for Lutfullin to move to train under Alexei Mishin in Saint Petersburg. Initially, the coach and skater traveled to Mishin for consultations and internships, after which Lutfullin permanently joined his training group.

At the Junior Cup of Russia, Lutfullin won bronze in the final. In the same season, he won three international competitions: the Warsaw Cup 2018, the Dragon Trophy 2019, and the Skate Victoria 2019.

In the fall of 2019, he became the bronze medalist at a stage of the Junior Grand Prix series in the United States.

In September 2021, Lutfullin won a stage of the Junior Grand Prix series held in Krasnoyarsk, and later earned another medal in Gdańsk. He was scheduled to compete in the Grand Prix Final in Osaka, Japan, but it was canceled due to the pandemic.

At the Panin–Kolomenkin Memorial that same year, he placed third.

In the fall of 2022, he entered his first full senior season. At the 2022 Panin–Kolomenkin Memorial, he won the silver medal. At the Grand Prix of Russia stage in Moscow, he placed second, and at the Samara stage, he took first place. In the free skate, the 18-year-old Lutfullin performed four quadruple jumps (a loop, a toe loop, a solo salchow, and a salchow in combination with a double toe loop).

At the 2025 Russian Championships, Lutfullin won the silver medal.

=== 2026–27 season: International debut ===
On 30 June 2026, the International Skating Union announced that figure skaters from Russia and Belarus would be allowed to compete at international competitions as Individual Neutral Athletes (AINs). Each of these skaters are be required to undergo an individual assessment conducted by the ISU Council to determine whether they meet the criteria for neutral status. Lutfullin's application was approved, making him eligible to compete internationally as a neutral athlete.

Lutfullin made his international debut at the 2026 CS Nepela Memorial, placing fourth overall. He followed this by winning silver at the 2026 CS Denis Ten Memorial.

== Programs ==
Season	Short program	Free skating	Exhibition
2026–2027	Stranger Things (Main Title Theme) by Michael Stein; Who Wants to Live Forever (Stranger Things Remix) by Queen, Cédric Baravaglio choreo. by Elizaveta Navislavskaya	Like a Prayer by Jay Smith and Lasse Andersson; The Duel (Drum & Piano Version) by Balázs Havasi; E lucevan le stelle (from “Tosca”) by Giacomo Puccini choreo. by Elizaveta Navislavskaya	
2025–2026	All The Lies (from Life on Call) by Manuk Ghazaryan, Oweek, and Anton Tokarev	The Godfather: Love Theme by Nino Rota performed by Matteo Setti and David Davidson; Waltz performed by André Rieu	Fun by Alexander Malinin
2024–2025	Caruso by Lucio Dalla performed by Seryo	Nature Boy performed by David Bowie; El Tango de Roxanne (from Moulin Rouge!) by Ewan McGregor, José Feliciano, and Jacek Koman	
2023–2024	La Bohème by Charles Aznavour	Rose and Air; Mon Reve le 31 Mars by Edo Notarloberti; The Water by Hurts	
2022–2023	Smile performed by Nat King Cole choreo. by Tatiana Prokofieva	Once Upon a Time in America by Ennio Morricone choreo. by Kirill Aleshin	
2021–2022	Black Earth by Fazıl Say choreo. by Tatiana Prokofieva	Malo Luna by Gino Vannelli choreo. by Tatiana Prokofieva	
2020–2021	Black Earth by Fazıl Say choreo. by Tatiana Prokofieva	Malo Luna by Gino Vannelli choreo. by Tatiana Prokofieva	
2019–2020	Jeszcze raz Vabank (from Vabank II) by Henryk Kuźniak choreo. by Tatiana Prokofieva	Moonlight Sonata by Ludwig van Beethoven choreo. by Tatiana Prokofieva; Caruso performed by Luciano Pavarotti choreo. by Tatiana Prokofieva	

== Competitive highlights ==
=== Skating as an Individual Neutral Athlete ===
Competition placements at senior level
Season	2026–27
CS Denis Ten Memorial	2nd
CS Nepela Memorial	4th

=== Skating for Russia ===
National
Event	20–21	21–22	22–23	23–24	24–25	25–26
Russian Championships		8th	8th	12th	2nd	5th
Russian Cup (Final)			2nd Jr.	5th		
Russian Junior Champ.			8th			
Team events
Channel One Trophy				1st		
