= Daria Usacheva =

Russian figure skater

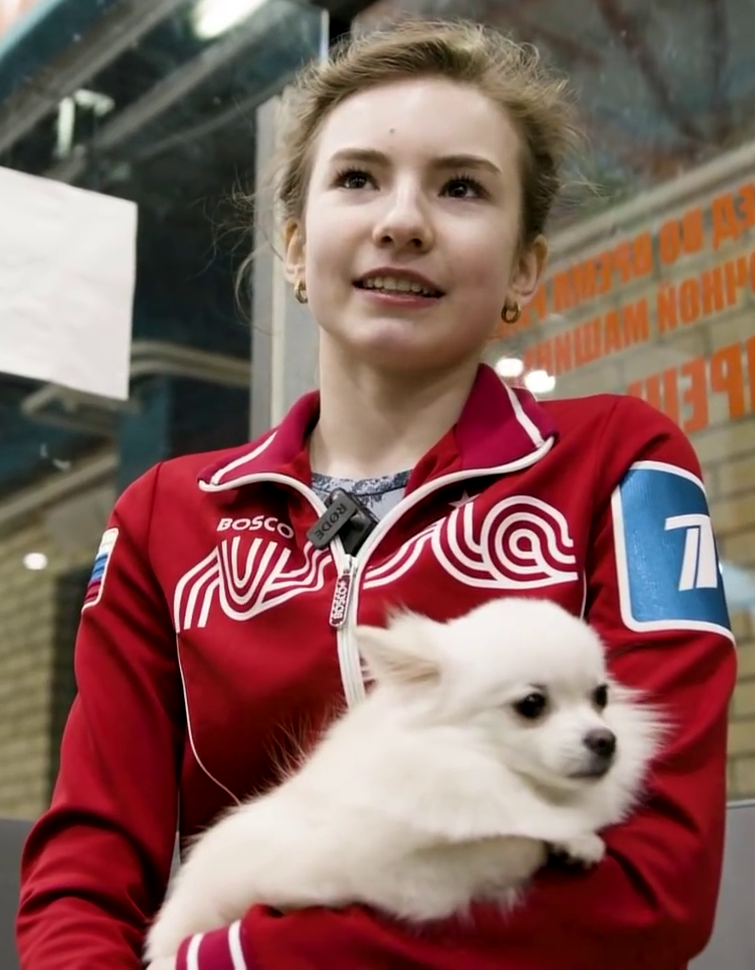
- Usacheva in 2021

Personal information
- Native name: Дарья Романовна Усачёва
- Full name: Daria Romanovna Usacheva
- Other names: Daria Usachyova
- Born: 22 May 2006 (age 20) Khabarovsk, Russia
- Height: 1.62 m (5 ft 4 in)

Figure skating career
- Country: Russia
- Coach: Eteri Tutberidze, Sergei Dudakov
- Skating club: Sambo 70 (Khrustalnyi)
- Began skating: 2009
- Retired: 7 September 2023
Medal record
Representing Russia
Figure skating: Ladies' singles
Junior World Championships
| Silver medal – second place | 2020 Tallinn | Ladies' singles |
Junior Grand Prix Final
| Bronze medal – third place | 2019–20 Turin | Ladies' singles |

Daria Romanovna Usacheva (pronounced Usachyova; Russian: Дарья Романовна Усачёва, born 22 May 2006) is a figure skating coach and retired Russian figure skater. She is the 2021 Skate America silver medalist.

On the junior level, she is the 2020 World Junior silver medalist, the 2019–20 Junior Grand Prix Final bronze medalist, the 2019 Denis Ten Memorial Challengechampion, and the 2020 Russian junior national bronze medalist.

== Personal life ==
Usacheva was born in Khabarovsk, Russia on 22 May 2006. She has a sister.

Following her retirement from competitive figure skating, Usacheva briefly coached at the Adelina Sotnikova Figure Skating School before moving to Beijing, China in 2025 to coach at the Passion Figure Skating Club.

Her figure skating idol was her former training mate, 2018 Olympic champion Alina Zagitova.

== Career ==
=== Early years ===
Usacheva began learning how to skate in 2009 at the age of three in her native Khabarovsk. After moving to Moscow with her family, Usacheva trained for several years in the group of Oksana Bulycheva at Sambo 70. After parting ways with Bulycheva, she trained under Anna Tsareva for a year before finally moving into Eteri Tutberidze's group within the same training complex.

=== 2019–2020 season: Junior international debut ===
Usacheva made her junior international debut in September 2019 at the 2019 JGP Latvia. She placed first in the short program at the event, but fell to third in the free skate to finish second overall behind South Korean skater Lee Hae-in. At her second Junior Grand Prix assignment, 2019 JGP Croatia, Usacheva duplicated her result from JGP Latvia, again earning a silver medal behind Lee Hae-in. In light of her results, and with 26 qualifying points in hand, Usacheva advanced to her first Junior Grand Prix Final.

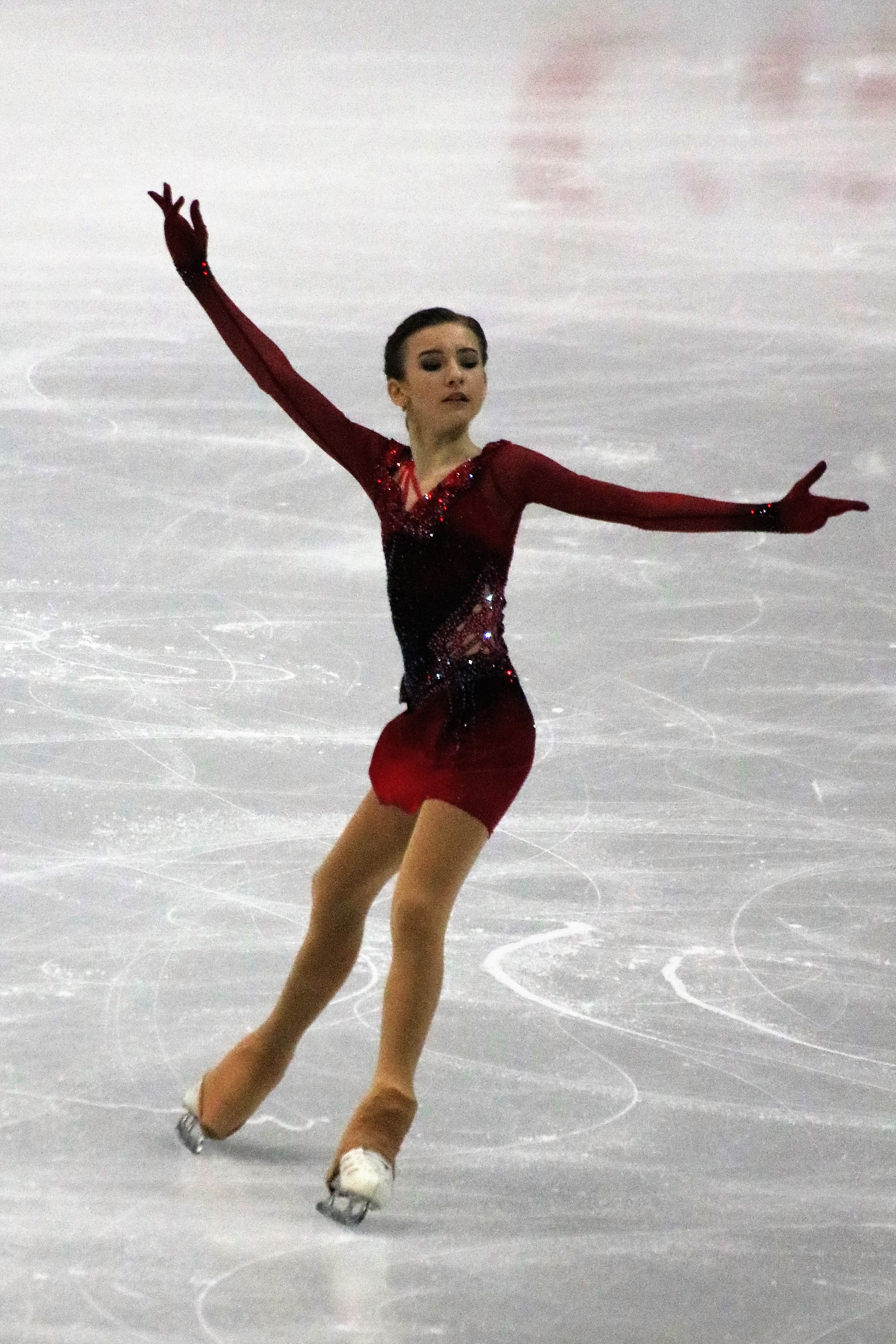
Usacheva performing a spread eagle at the 2019–20 Junior Grand Prix Final

Usacheva next competed in the junior ladies category at the inaugural Denis Ten Memorial Challenge where she won both the short program and the free skate to earn her first international gold medal ahead of training mate Maiia Khromykh in second and Bulgarian competitor Maria Levushkina in third.

In December 2019, Usacheva competed at the 2019–20 Junior Grand Prix Final in Turin, Italy. She set new personal best scores in both the free skate (despite errors) and overall to win the bronze medal behind gold medalist and training mate Kamila Valieva and American silver medalist Alysa Liu. In an interview with Sports.ru following the event, Usacheva stated that she'd begun training a triple axel and that she hoped to debut the element at the 2020 Russian Junior Figure Skating Championships in February 2020.

Usacheva did not compete again until the 2020 Russian Junior Figure Skating Championships where she won the bronze medal behind training mates Kamila Valieva and Sofia Akatieva. Usacheva executed both of her programs cleanly for the first time in competition all season, and due to her result was named to the Russian team for the 2020 World Junior Championships in March along with Valieva and training mate and fifth-place finisher Maiia Khromykh, as silver medalist Akatieva and fourth-place finisher Sofia Samodelkina were ineligible due to age. Usacheva was the sole skater among the top five to not attempt a triple axel or quadruple jump.

At the 2020 World Junior Championships in Tallinn, Estonia, Usacheva placed third in the short program behind training partner Kamila Valieva and Lee Hae-in of South Korea after under-rotating the second jump in her triple flip-triple toeloop combination. In the free skate, Usacheva delivered a clean performance for the first time internationally to rise to second place behind Valieva and ahead of American Alysa Liu, setting new personal bests in the free skate and overall. Usacheva and Lee were the only two skaters in the top five to not attempt a triple axel or quadruple jump.

=== 2020–21 season ===
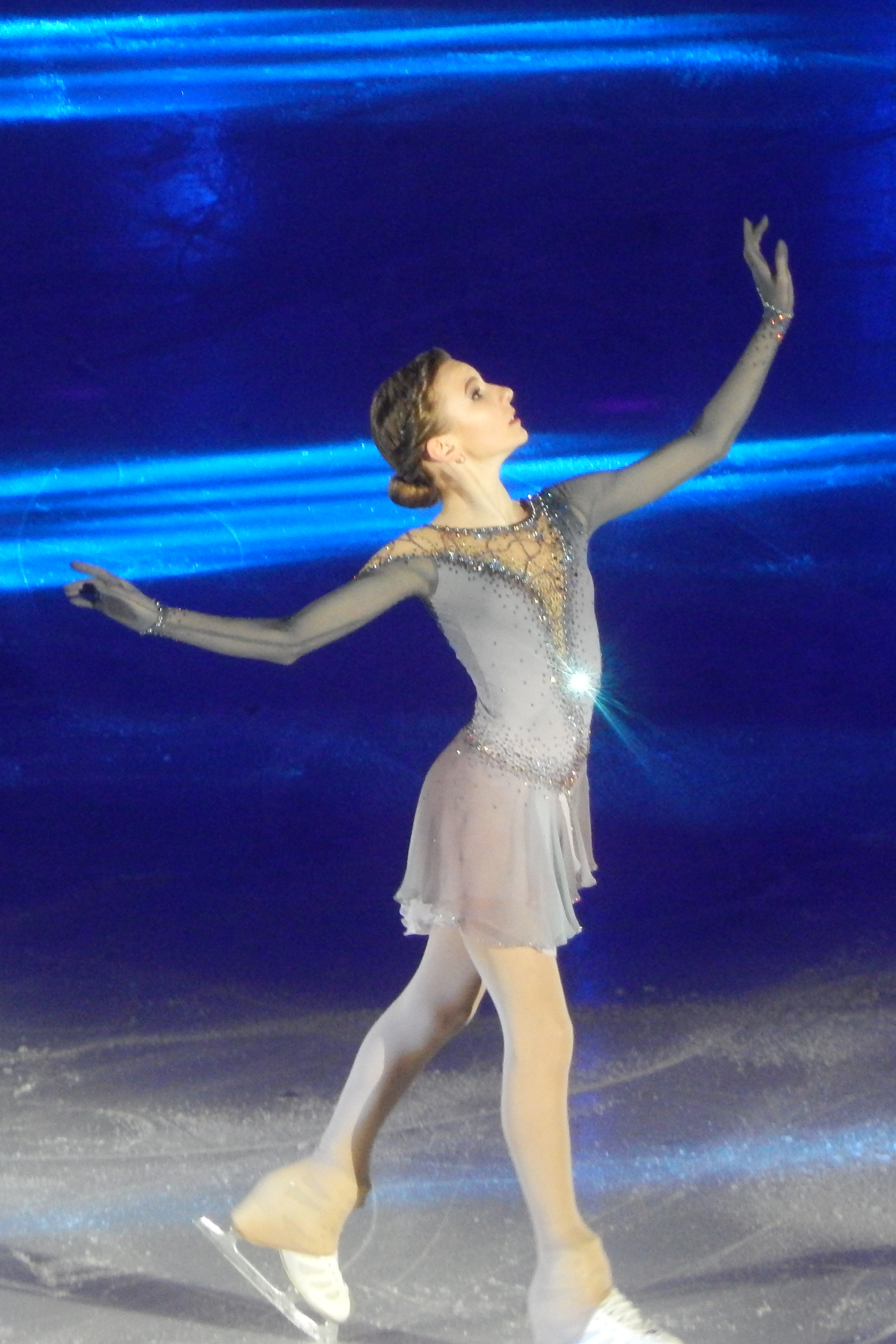
Usacheva performing at the Moscow VTB Arena Ice Show

Usacheva made her senior domestic debut at the second stage of the Russian Cup in Moscow. She placed second after the short program and third in the free skate behind teammate Kamila Valieva and former teammate Alexandra Trusova, skating two clean programs and earning the bronze medal. At the third stage in Sochi, she led Anna Shcherbakova after the short program and finished second in the free skate and overall after a fall from a triple flip-triple toeloop combination.

Usacheva's results qualified her to the 2021 Russian Championships, where she placed third in the short program, behind Shcherbakova and Valieva but narrowly ahead of Trusova. Fourth in the free skate, she dropped to fourth place overall, the highest-ranked skater who did not attempt a quadruple jump.

Following the national championships, Usacheva participated in the 2021 Channel One Trophy, a televised team event organized in lieu of the cancelled European Championships. She was selected for the Red Machine team captained by Alina Zagitova, and placed third in the short program and fourth in the free skate. The Red Machine won the trophy. Subsequently, she also participated in the Russian Cup Final, where she won the bronze medal.

=== 2021–22 season: Senior international debut ===
Usacheva debuted her programs for the Olympic season along with her fellow Russian national team members at the 2021 Russian test skate event in September. She mentioned in an interview with Channel One Russia at the event that she'd suffered a minor injury two weeks before that affected her preparation for the season, as well as her work towards attaining a triple Axel.

Due to travel restrictions caused by the COVID-19 pandemic, there was some concern over whether or not Usacheva and several of her compatriots would be able to obtain travel visas to the United States in a timely enough manner to compete at the first Grand Prix event of the season, the 2021 Skate America. Fortunately, she and the rest of the Russian delegation were able to obtain proper documentation two weeks ahead of the event in order to attend.

At Skate America, Usacheva's senior international debut, she cleanly skated her short program to score a new personal best and place second in the segment behind training-mate Alexandra Trusova. In the free skate, Usacheva struggled technically in the latter half of the program and fell to fourth in the segment, but her lead from the short was enough to keep her on the podium with the silver medal overall behind Trusova and ahead of South Korean competitor You Young. Usacheva entered her second Grand Prix, the 2021 NHK Trophy, as one of the favorites for the gold medal following Trusova's withdrawal due to injury. However, in the warm-up for the short program she injured herself while attempting a triple flip, and was forced to withdraw from the event as well. Match TV initially reported that she was suffering from a hip fracture, but in subsequent Russian Figure Skating Federation announced that Usacheva suffered detachment of the ligament of one of the internal muscles of the right upper leg in the growth zone of the femur and that was not considered to be a long-term problem. Nevertheless, the injury prevented Usacheva from competing at the 2022 Russian Championships in December. She returned to training in March 2022.

Usacheva announced her retirement from competitive figure skating on 7 September 2023.

== Programs ==
Competition and exhibition programs by season
| Season | Short program | Free skate program | Exhibition program |
|---|---|---|---|
| 2017–18 | "Fantasia for Violin and Orchestra": From Ladies in Lavender; Composed by Nigel Hess; Performed by Joshua Bell | Swan Lake: From Ladies in Lavender; Composed by Pyotr Ilyich Tchaikovsky | —N/a |
| 2018–19 | "Please Don't Make Me Love You": From Dracula, the Musical; Composed by Frank Wildhorn; Performed by Linda Eder; Choreo. by Daniil Gleikhengauz | James Bond: 1. "James Bond Theme"; Composed by Monty Norman; 2. "Skyfall"; Performed by Adele; Performed by John Barry (composer); Choreo. by Daniil Gleikhengauz | —N/a |
| 2019–20 | "Please Don't Make Me Love You" | "Je suis malade": Performed by Lara Fabian; Choreo. by Daniil Gleikhengauz | James Bond Theme |
| 2020–21 | "One Day I'll Fly Away": From Moulin Rouge!; Performed by Nicole Kidman; Choreo. by Daniil Gleikhengauz | Romeo and Juliet: 1. "O Verona"; From Romeo + Juliet; Composed by Craig Armstrong; 2. "Come, Gentle Night"; From Romeo & Juliet; Composed by Abel Korzeniowski; 3. "Montagues and Capulets"; From Romeo and Juliet; Composed by Sergei Prokofiev; Choreo. by Daniil Gleikhengauz | "Je suis malade" |
| 2021–22 | "Never Enough": From The Greatest Showman; Composed by Pasek and Paul; Performed by Loren Allred; Choreo. by Daniil Gleikhengauz | "Nessun dorma": From Turandot; Composed by Giacomo Puccini; Choreo. by Daniil Gleikhengauz | "One Day I'll Fly Away" |

== Competitive highlights ==
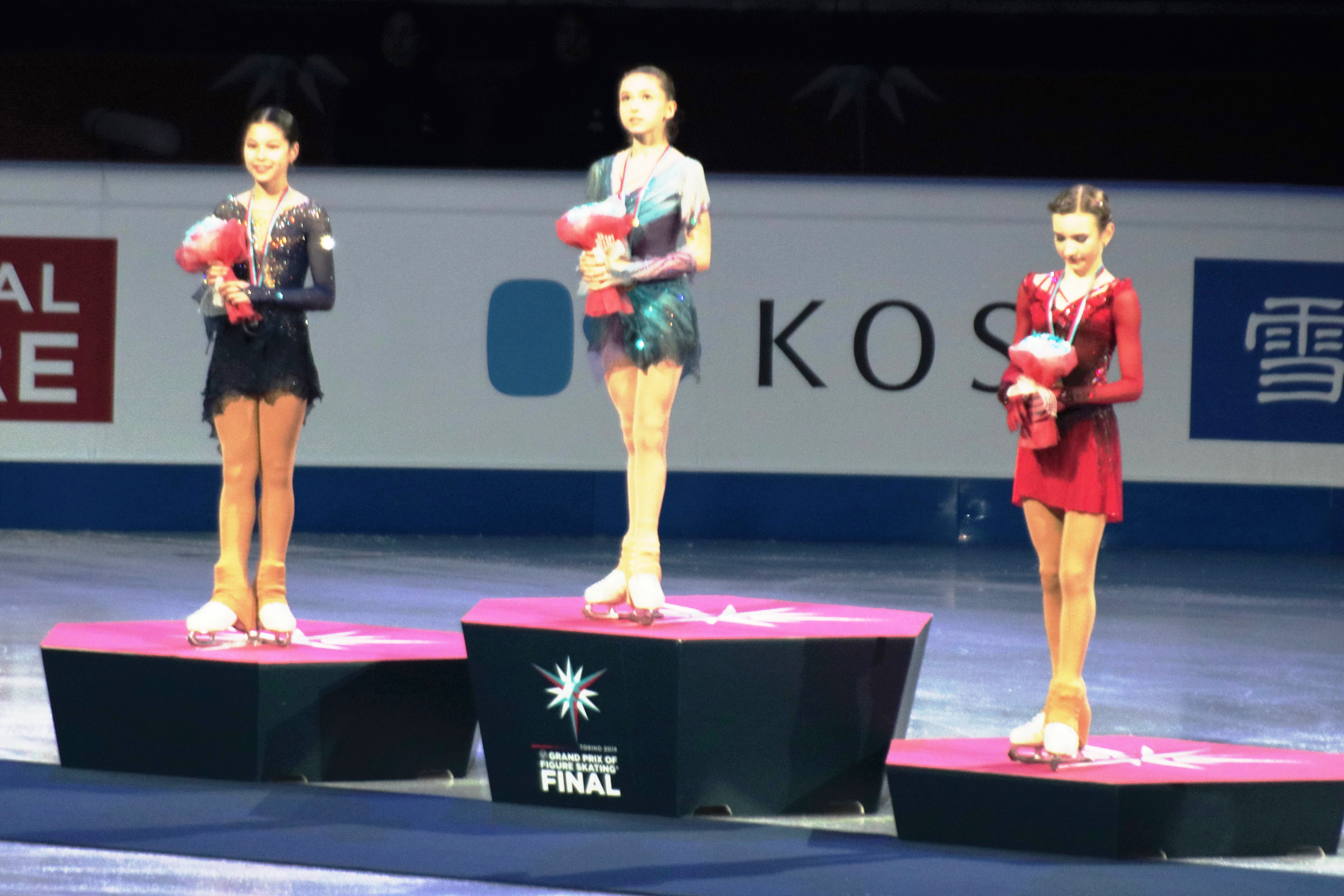
Usacheva (right) on the podium at the 2019–20 Junior Grand Prix Final with Kamila Valieva (center) and Alysa Liu (left).

Legend

- GP – Event of the ISU Grand Prix Series
- JGP – Event of the ISU Junior Grand Prix Series
- C – Cancelled event, WD – Withdrawal

Competition placements at senior level
| Season | 2020-21 | 2021-22 |
|---|---|---|
| GP Skate America | | 2nd |
| GP NHK Trophy | | WD |
| Russian Cup Final | 3rd | |
| Russian Championships | 4th | WD |

Competition placements at junior level
| Season | 2018-19 | 2019-20 |
|---|---|---|
| JGP Croatia | | 2nd |
| JGP Latvia | | 2nd |
| Junior Grand Prix Final | | 3rd |
| Junior Worlds | | 2nd |
| Denis Ten Memorial | | 1st |
| Russian Junior Championships | 10th | 3rd |
| Russian Cup Final (Junior) | 2nd | |

== Detailed results ==
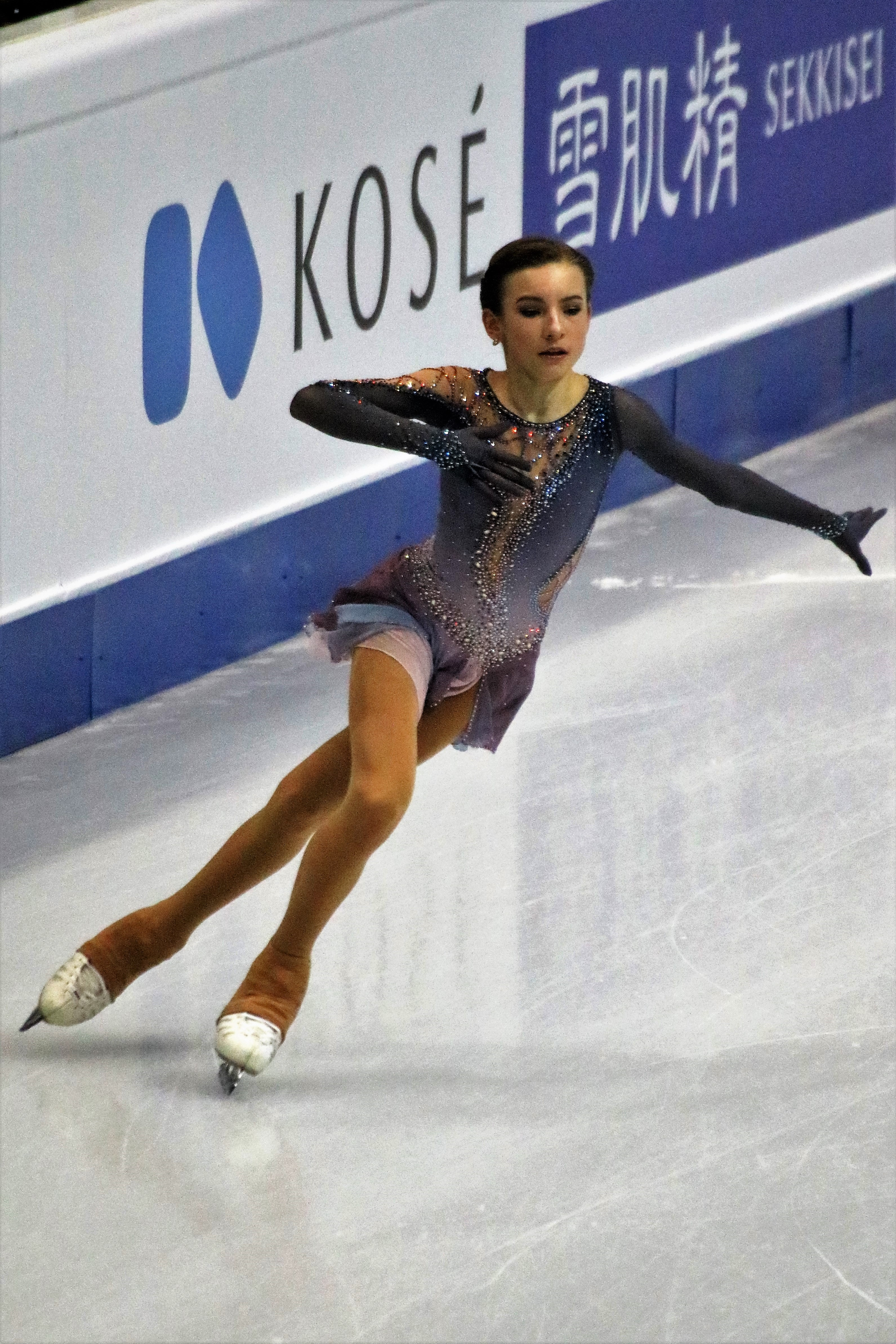
Usacheva performing at the 2019–20 Junior Grand Prix Final

Small medals for short and free programs awarded only at ISU Championships. Personal bests highlighted in bold.

=== Senior level ===
**2021–22 season**
| Date | Event | SP | FS | Total |
| 12–14 November 2021 | 2021 NHK Trophy | WD | WD | WD |
| 22–24 October 2021 | 2021 Skate America | 2; **76.71** | 4; **140.60** | 2; **217.31** |
**2020–21 season**
| Date | Event | SP | FS | Total |
| 26 Feb. – 2 Mar. 2021 | 2021 Russian Cup Final domestic competition | 2; 79.12 | 2; 150.59 | 3; 229.71 |
| 5–7 February 2021 | 2021 Channel One Trophy | 3; 80.84 | 4; 155.04 | 1T/4P; 235.88 |
| 24–26 December 2020 | 2021 Russian Figure Skating Championships | 3; 76.72 | 4; 153.84 | 4; 230.56 |
| 9–10 December 2020 | 2020 Moscow Championships | 1; 74.44 | 1; 143.69 | 1; 218.13 |
| 23–27 October 2020 | 2020 Cup of Russia Series, 3rd Stage, Sochi domestic competition | 1; 78.41 | 2; 146.78 | 2; 225.19 |
| 10–13 October 2020 | 2020 Cup of Russia Series, 2nd Stage, Moscow domestic competition | 2; 80.39 | 2; 152.81 | 3; 233.20 |

=== Junior level ===
2019–20 season
| Date | Event | Level | SP | FS | Total |
|---|---|---|---|---|---|
| 2–8 March 2020 | 2020 World Junior Championships | Junior | 3; 68.45 | 2; 139.29 | 2; 207.74 |
| 4–8 February 2020 | 2020 Russian Junior Championships | Junior | 2; 73.77 | 3; 143.53 | 3; 217.30 |
| 5–8 December 2019 | 2019–20 JGP Final | Junior | 2; 70.15 | 3; 130.22 | 3; 200.37 |
| 29 Oct. – 2 Nov. 2019 | 2019 Russian Cup Stage 3 | Junior | 1; 73.27 | 1; 139.51 | 1; 212.78 |
| 10–13 October 2019 | Denis Ten Memorial Challenge | Junior | 1; 74.46 | 1; 136.79 | 1; 211.25 |
| 25–28 September 2019 | 2019 JGP Croatia | Junior | 1; **71.09** | 2; 126.10 | 2; 197.19 |
| 4–7 September 2019 | 2019 JGP Latvia | Junior | 1; 69.04 | 3; 125.36 | 2; 194.40 |
