= Maya Khromykh =

Russian figure skater (born 2006)

Maiia Khromykh
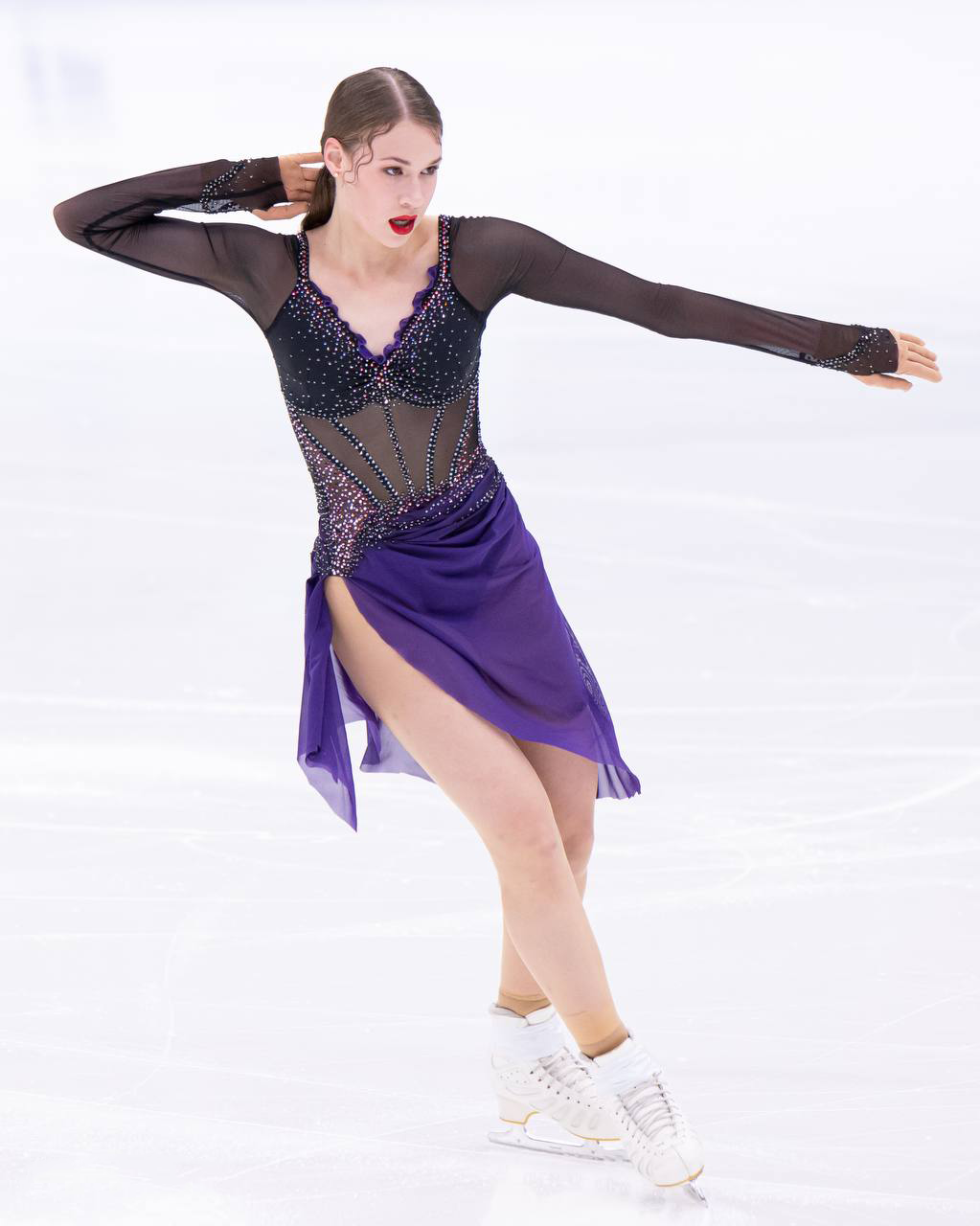

Personal information
- Native name: Майя Владиславовна Хромых
- Full name: Maiia Vladislavovna Khromykh
- Other names: Maiia Khromykh, Maia Khromykh, Maya Khromykh
- Born: 25 May 2006 (age 20) Nizhny Tagil, Russia
- Home town: Moscow, Russia
- Height: 1.75 m (5 ft 9 in)

Figure skating career
- Country: Russia
- Coach: Eteri Tutberidze, Sergei Dudakov
- Skating club: Sambo 70 (Khrustalnyi), Moscow
- Began skating: 2009

Maya or Maiia Vladislavovna Khromykh (Russian: Майя Владиславовна Хромых; born 25 May 2006) is a Russian figure skater. She is the 2021 Gran Premio d'Italia silver medalist, the 2021 Rostelecom Cup bronze medalist, the 2021 CS Warsaw Cup champion, and the 2021 Budapest Trophy champion.

On the junior level, she is the 2019 JGP France bronze medalist, and the 2019 Denis Ten Memorial Challenge silver medalist. She finished fourth at the 2020 World Junior Championships.

== Personal life ==
Maya Khromykh was born on 25 May 2006 in Nizhny Tagil, Russia. Maya's father Vladislav Khromykh is an ice hockey coach. He was a head coach of the Russian ice hockey team at the 2017 Winter Universiade where the team won the gold medal. Her brother Yaroslav is a hockey player. In February 2026, she married former Russian skater, Adian Pittkeev.

== Career ==
=== Early years ===
Khromykh began learning how to skate in 2009 as early as at the age of three. She was coached by Anna Boldina and subsequently by Anna Tsareva at Sambo-70 'Khrustalniy' until autumn 2018. She then joined Eteri Tutberidze, Daniil Gleikhengauz and Sergei Dudakov.

=== 2019–20 season: International debut ===
At the 2019 Russian Cup Final held in Novgorod, Russia, Khromykh scored 201.06 in total winning junior ladies' gold with Daria Usacheva to claim silver with a total score of 189.83 points and Anna Frolova claiming bronze with the score of 189.38 points.

On international arena, Khromykh debuted in the 2019/2020 skating season in August 2019 at the 2019 JGP France in Courchevel. Although she won the short program, she ranked fifth in the free skate, and overall finished third behind fellow Russian Kamila Valieva winning gold and South Korean silver medalist Wi Seo-yeong.

At her second assignment, the 2019 JGP Latvia in September, Khromykh ranked second after the short program, but fell to fourth in the free skate standings, and finished in the fourth place overall.

Competing at the Denis Ten Memorial Challenge held in Almaty, Kazakhstan, Khromykh won silver medal behind her fellow Russian Daria Usacheva.

In February 2020, scoring 204.40 in total, Khromykh took 5th position at the Russian Junior Nationals 2020, Junior Ladies held in Saransk, Mordovia.

During her first season competing on the international level, she was selected as one of the three main entries to represent Russia in the 2020 World Junior Figure Skating Championships. She finished 5th in the short program after a minor error on her triple loop landing. In the free skate she stepped out of the landing on her quad Salchow attempt, but avoided a fall and skated the rest of the program clean. She achieved a new personal best score for her free skate and total score. She finished fourth place overall.

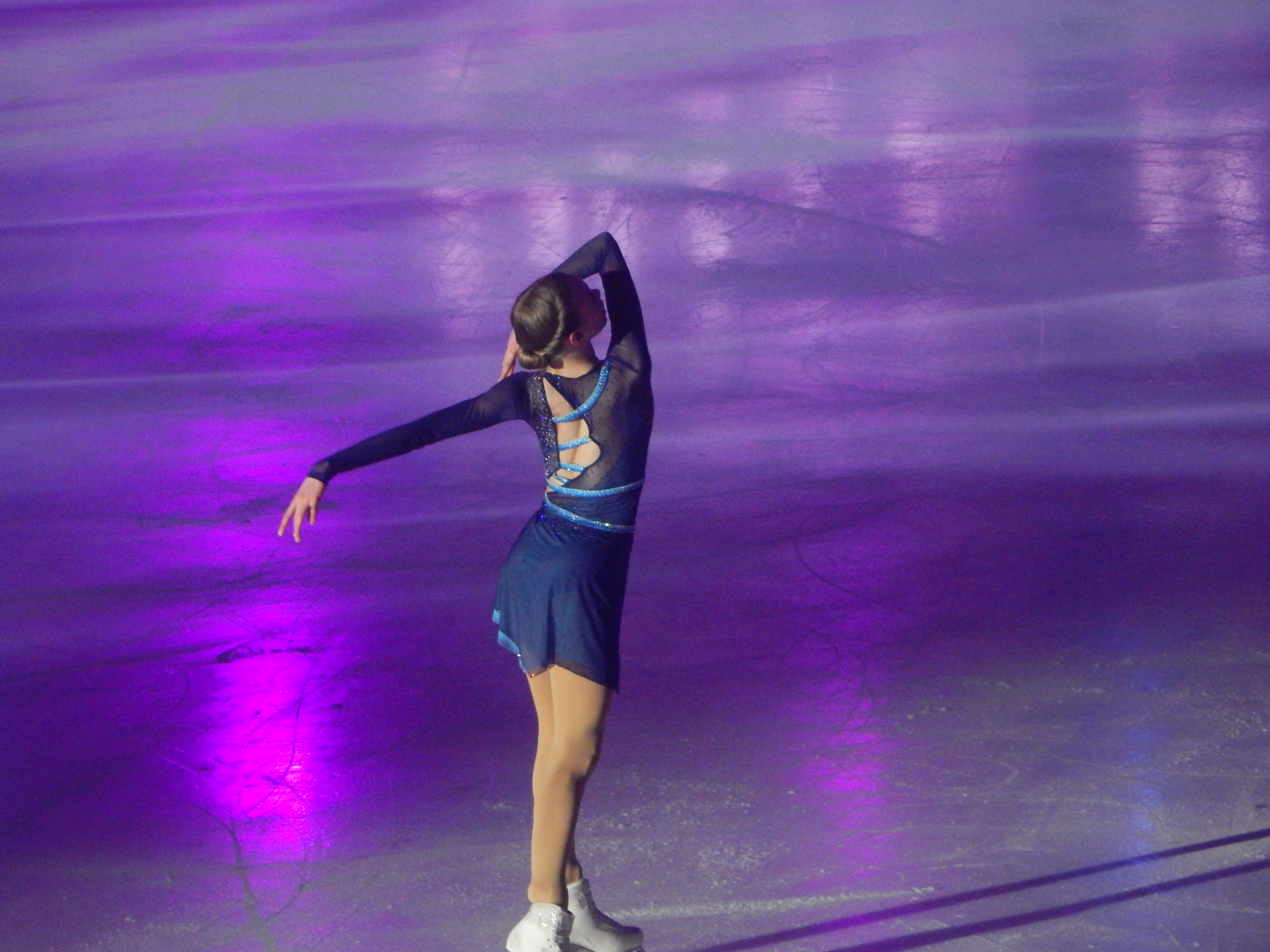
Maya performing at the Moscow VTB Arena Ice Show (2020)

=== 2020–21 season ===
Competing as a senior at the domestic level, Khromykh won the bronze medals at the first Cup of Russia stage in Syzran and the fourth stage in Kazan.

These results qualified her for the 2021 Russian Championships, where she placed seventh in the short program. She was fifth in the free skate, falling on her attempted quad toe loop but going on to land seven triple jumps, and placed fifth overall.

In February, Khromykh took part in the 2021 Channel One Trophy, a televised team event organized in lieu of the cancelled European Championships, named to replace Alena Kostornaia, who withdrew for health reasons. She was selected for the Time of Firsts team captained by Evgenia Medvedeva. She finished fifth in the short program and sixth in the free skate, while the Time of Firsts finished in second place overall.

Khromykh's final event of the season was the Russian Cup Final, where she was fourth in the short program. In the free skate she landed the quad toeloop for the first time in competition, and introduced and landed the quadruple Salchow. She finished first in the free skate following Valieva's falling on her quad, and second overall behind Kamila Valieva by only 2.04 points based on Valieva's strong short program.

=== 2021–22 season: International senior debut ===
Khromykh debuted her programs for the 2021–22 season at the 2021 Russian test skate event in September. In her free skate, she cleanly landed a quad toeloop for the second time in her career in a competitive setting, but later popped a planned quad Salchow into a single.

Khromykh later opened her competitive season in mid-October at the 2021 Budapest Trophy. She placed second in the short program at the event behind teammate Anna Shcherbakova. During the free skate, she landed a clean quad toeloop-triple toeloop combination to move ahead of Shcherbakova, and win the event in her senior debut.

Khromykh made her Grand Prix debut at 2021 Gran Premio d'Italia where she placed second in the short program behind Loena Hendrickx. In the free skate, Khromykh successfully landed two quad toeloops and scored her personal best of 154.31 points to take silver medal behind her compatriot Anna Shcherbakova. At her next competition, the 2021 CS Warsaw Cup, Khromykh placed first in the short program, but struggled on her jumping passes in the free skate, most notably on her two planned quad toeloops, and fell to second in the free program. Her lead after the short bolstered her score and kept her in the lead overall to take the title.

At the 2021 Rostelecom Cup, Khromykh's second Grand Prix assignment, she placed fifth in the short program after falling on the triple Lutz in her planned triple Lutz-triple toeloop combination, but climbed to second in the free skate by landing both of her planned quad toeloops, and finished third overall behind compatriots Kamila Valieva and Elizaveta Tuktamysheva. Her results over her two Grand Prix events qualified her to the 2021–22 Grand Prix Final, seeded fourth behind Valieva, Shcherbakova, and Tuktamysheva. However, the Final was subsequently cancelled due to restrictions prompted by the Omicron variant.

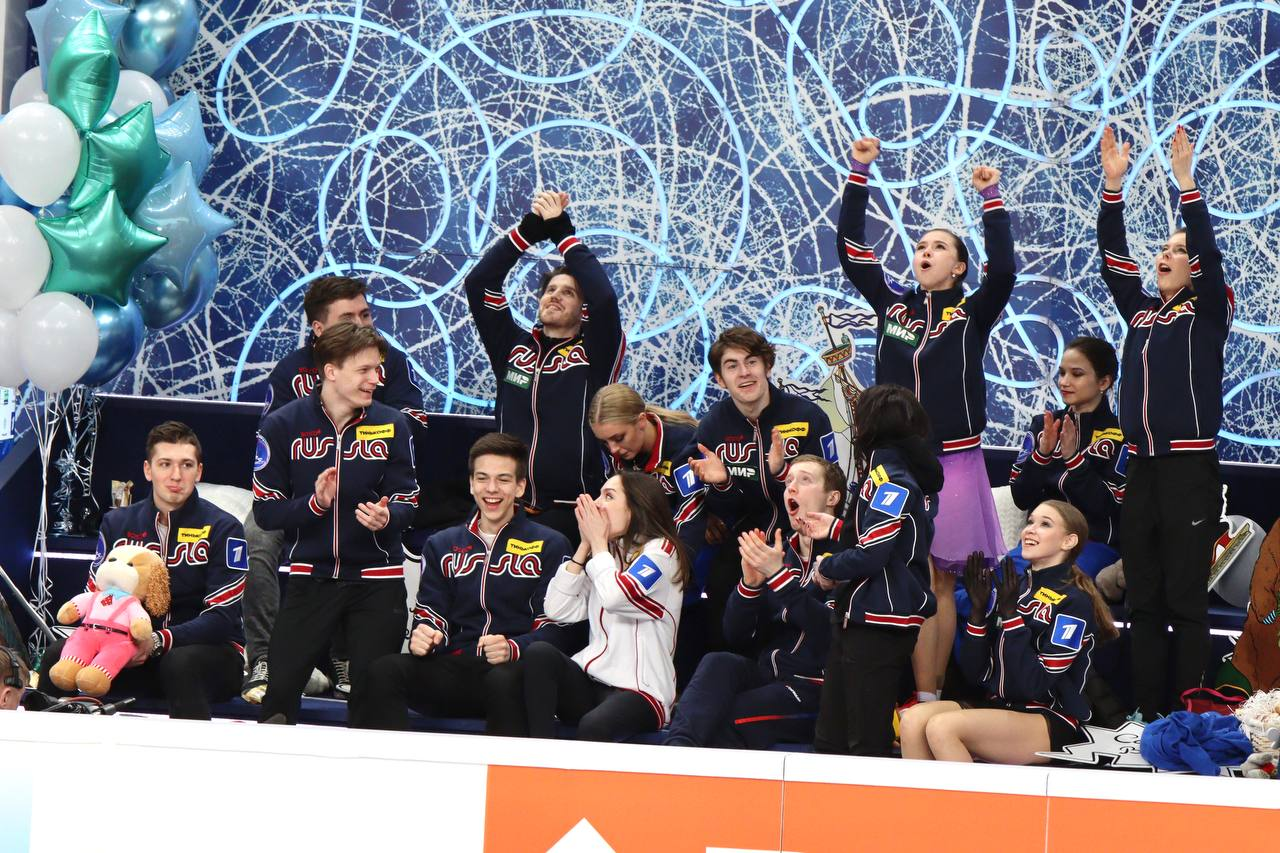
Maya with teammates at the 2022 Channel One Cup

At the 2022 Russian Championships, Khromykh placed eighth, and fifth among senior-eligible skaters. Khromykh was named as second alternate to the Russian women's team for the 2022 Winter Olympics on 20 January.

Khromykh’s last competition of the season was the 2022 Channel One Trophy where she was part of the team named Time Of Firsts and was captained by Mark Kondratiuk. Ranking fourth in the short program and sixth in the free skate, she finished sixth out of six skaters in the individual standings and lost to the team named The Red Machine, captained by Anna Shcherbakova in the team standings.

=== 2022–2023 season: Injury struggles ===
Whilst preparing for the upcoming competitive season Khromykh cut her hand with the blade of her skate in practice, and had to spend a week in hospital. When she returned to the rink she had to train with a cast that went up to her elbow and she was unable to tie her own skates. As her hand injury healed she began to train quadruple jumps again but was then plagued by a back injury she had sustained as a junior and was forced to miss the entire 2022-2023 competitive season.

=== 2023–2024 season: Return to competition ===
As Russia remained banned from international competition, Khromykh opted to compete on the Russian Grand Prix series (a series of all-Russian competitions in the same format as the international Grand Prix series). Khromyk was assigned to the third and fifth stages of the series.

In October 2023 Khromykh competed for the first time since March 2022, at the third stage of the Russian Grand Prix. In the short program she failed to execute her triple lutz - triple toeloop combination after falling on the lutz, causing her to rank in 8th place. In the free skate she executed her triple lutz-triple toeloop successfully but fell on a second lutz attempt and popped an intended triple-flip to a double. She ranked in fifth place in the free skate segment and fifth place overall.

At the Fifth stage of the Russian Grand Prix held in Samara, Khromykh turned out of her triple flip attempt in the short program and managed only a triple lutz-double toeloop combination but still ranked in third place behind Ksenia Sinitsyna and Daria Sadkova. She majorly struggled in the free skate however, botching the landings on her two opening triple-triple combinations and falling on both a triple loop and triple lutz attempt. She dropped to seventh place in the free skate and to fifth overall.

Khromykh’s results on the Russian Grand Prix series qualified her for the 2024 Russian Figure Skating Championships. In the short program at the Russian nationals Khromykh ranked in ninth place after stepping out of her triple-flip attempt although she otherwise skated cleanly. In the free skate she landed only a handful of jumps cleanly, falling four times and popping a triple-flip attempt to a double, she also failed to land any triple-triple combinations. She scored 95.90 in the free skate segment, causing her to score only 164.30, over 60 points lower than her personal best in the combined total segment. She ranked 18th out of 18 skaters overall. Khromykh’s performance at the Russian Nationals was harshly criticised, with 2014 Olympic Champion Maxim Trankov who was commentating the event saying, “what should I say, words are powerless. She's the champion of falls. Four times – not everyone allows themselves to fall like that.” Esteemed former figure skating coach and adviser of the Russian National Team, Tatiana Tarasova publicly made comments about Khromykh’s weight and performance, saying, “She is so big, maybe it's better not to participate – stay at home, train, get in shape and then show yourself to the entire country.”

Khromykh did not compete at the 2024 Russian Grand Prix Final despite qualifying.

=== 2025–present ===
As of February 2026, Maya has not returned to competition. She has been working as a coach under the name of "Figure Skating Group of Maya Vladislavovna" On the 26th of February 2026, Maya announced her marriage to Adian Pittkeev, a former Russian figure skater.

== Programs ==
Season	Short program	Free skating	Exhibition
2023–2024	Ashes (from Deadpool 2) by Celine Dion choreo. by Daniil Gleikhengauz	My Love; The Devil You Know by Sharon Kovacs choreo. by Daniil Gleikhengauz	
2022–2023	Did not compete this season		
2021–2022	I'll Take Care of You by Beth Hart and Joe Bonamassa choreo. by Daniil Gleikhengauz	Buenos Aires Hora Cero by Astor Piazzolla performed by Gidon Kremer; El Tango de Roxanne (from Moulin Rouge!) performed by Anna Dereszowska choreo. by Daniil Gleikhengauz	Fantasy for Violin and Orchestra (from Ladies in Lavender) by Nigel Hess choreo. by Daniil Gleikengauz
2020–2021	I'll Take Care of You by Beth Hart and Joe Bonamassa choreo. by Daniil Gleikhengauz	Anna's Theme; Birth of the Red Violin (from The Red Violin) by John Corigliano; Agony Suite: III. Tango by Alfred Schnittke choreo. by Daniil Gleikhengauz	Non, je ne regrette rien performed by Édith Piaf
2019–2020	Fantasy for Violin and Orchestra (from Ladies in Lavender) by Nigel Hess choreo. by Daniil Gleikengauz	Ghost: Unchained Melody/The Love Inside performed by Richard Fleeshman and Caissie Levy; Suspend My Disbelief/I Had a Life performed by Richard Fleeshman, Caissie Levy, and Andrew Langtree choreo. by Daniil Gleikhengauz	

== Competitive highlights ==
GP: Grand Prix; JGP: Junior Grand Prix; CS: ISU Challenger Series

International
Event	19–20	20–21	21–22	22–23	23–24
GP Final			C		
GP Cup of China			C		
GP Italy			2nd		
GP Rostelecom			3rd		
CS Warsaw Cup			1st		
Budapest Trophy			1st		
International: Junior
Junior Worlds	4th				
JGP France	3rd				
JGP Latvia	4th				
Denis Ten Memorial	2nd				
National
Russian Champ.		5th	7th		18th
Russian Junior Champ.	5th				
Russian Cup (Final)		2nd			
GPR Krasnoyarye					5th
GPR Volga Pirouette					5th
Team events
Channel One Trophy		2nd T 6th P	2nd T 6th P		
TBD = Assigned; WD = Withdrew; C = Event cancelled T = Team result; P = Personal result. Medals awarded for team result only.

== Detailed results ==
=== Senior level ===
Small medals for short and free programs awarded only at ISU Championships.

Results in the 2020-21 season
Date	Event	SP		FS		Total	
Date	Event	P	Score	P	Score	P	Score
Sep 18-22, 2020	(Russia) 2020 Russian Cup - Stage 1	1	69.28	3	123.34	2	192.62
Nov 8-12, 2020	(Russia) 2020 Russian Cup - Stage 4	3	76.89	3	135.83	3	212.72
Dec 23-27, 2020	(Russia) 2021 Russian Championships	7	72.93	5	138.98	5	211.91
Feb 26-Mar 2, 2021	(Russia) 2021 Russian Cup Final	4	73.77	1	162.19	2	235.96

Results in the 2021-22 season
Date	Event	SP		FS		Total	
Date	Event	P	Score	P	Score	P	Score
Oct 14-17, 2021	(Hungary) 2021 Budapest Trophy	1	72.82	2	152.09	1	224.91
Nov 5-7, 2021	(Italy) 2021 Gran Premio d'Italia	2	72.04	2	154.31	2	226.35
Nov 18-21, 2021	(Poland) 2021 CS Warsaw Cup	1	69.24	2	124.78	1	194.02
Nov 26-28, 2021	(Russia) 2021 Rostelecom Cup	5	64.72	2	154.97	3	219.69
Dec 22-24, 2021	(Russia) 2022 Russian Championships	9	69.36	8	147.82	7	217.18

Results in the 2023-24 season
Date	Event	SP		FS		Total	
Date	Event	P	Score	P	Score	P	Score
Oct 27-30, 2023	(Russia) 2023 Russian Cup - Stage 3	8	62.06	5	131.16	5	193.22
Nov 25-26, 2023	(Russia) 2023 Russian Cup - Stage 5	3	66.69	7	116.01	5	182.70
Dec 20-24, 2023	(Russia) 2024 Russian Championships	9	68.40	18	95.90	18	164.30

=== Junior level ===
Small medals for short and free programs awarded only at ISU Championships.

Results in the 2018-19 season
Date	Event	SP		FS		Total	
Date	Event	P	Score	P	Score	P	Score
Nov 20-24, 2018	(Russia) 2018 Russian Cup - Stage 5 (Junior)	5	62.60	2	128.44	2	191.04
Feb 18-29, 2019	(Russia) 2019 Russian Cup Final (Junior)	1	70.11	1	130.95	1	201.06

Results in the 2019-20 season
Date	Event	SP		FS		Total	
Date	Event	P	Score	P	Score	P	Score
Aug 21-24, 2019	2019 JGP France	1	67.72	5	111.60	3	179.32
Sep 4-7, 2019	2019 JGP Latvia	2	68.93	4	121.80	4	190.73
Oct 9-12, 2019	(Kazakhstan) 2019 CS Tenis Ten Memorial (Junior)	2	66.16	2	125.69	2	191.85
Oct 29-Nov 2, 2019	(Russia) 2019 Russian Cup - Stage 3 (Junior)	9	58.87	2	130.72	5	189.59
Nov 20-24, 2019	(Russia) 2019 Russian Cup - Stage 5 (Junior)	1	70.54	5	118,27	3	188.81
Feb 4-8, 2020	(Russia) 2020 Russian Junior Championships	6	67.68	5	136.72	5	204.40
March 2-8, 2020	(Estonia) 2020 World Junior Championships	5	66.78	4	131.46	4	198.24
