= 2023 Channel One Trophy =

Domestic Team Competition in Russia

2022 Channel One Trophy
- Type: Domestic competition
- Date: January 21 – January 22
- Season: 2022–23
- Location: Moscow, Russia
- Previous: 2022

The 2023 Channel One Trophy was a Russian domestic team figure skating competition held from 21 to 22 January 2023 in Moscow, Russia. Single skaters who placed in the top eight and pairs who placed in the top 4 at the 2023 Russian Championships were invited to compete.

Skaters competed against each other in two teams consisting of four men's single skaters, four ladies' single skaters and two pair teams. Four ice dance teams were invited to show their programs but did not contribute to the points gathered by the teams. The teams were randomly selected by draw by team captains Kamila Valieva and Alina Zagitova.

The competition was broadcast by Channel One Russia and was made available to international viewers via YouTube.

== Entries ==
Men	Women	Pairs
Dmitri Aliev	Sofia Akateva	Aleksandra Boikova / Dmitrii Kozlovskii
Petr Gumennik	Alina Gorbacheva	Yasmina Kadyrova / Valerii Kolesov
Makar Ignatov	Ksenia Gushchina (Note: Anastasia Zinina was unable to finish the short program due to injury and was replaced with Ksenia Gushchina in the free skating. As a result, it was decided to count only the top three results from each team in the Women's Short Program, so Veronika Yametova's points earned in this segment of the competition were not counted into the total team score.)	Anastasia Mishina / Aleksandr Galliamov
Artem Kovalev	Sofia Muravieva	Evgenia Tarasova / Vladimir Morozov
Gleb Lutfullin	Adeliia Petrosian	
Andrei Mozalev	Sofia Samodelkina	
Alexander Samarin	Elizaveta Tuktamysheva	
Evgeni Semenenko	Veronika Yametova	
	Anastasia Zinina	

=== Changes to preliminary entries ===
Date	Discipline	Withdrew	Added	Reason/Other notes	Refs
January 13	Women	Kseniia Sinitsyna	Alina Gorbacheva	Stress fracture of fibula	
January 18	Women	Kamila Valieva	Sofia Samodelkina	Lack of preparation time after illness	

== Teams ==
Teams
Team name	Event	Members
Not Gonna Get Us (Kamila Valieva)	Men; Women; Pairs; Ice Dance*	Dmitri Aliev, Makar Ignatov, Andrei Mozalev, Evgeni Semenenko Ksenia Gushchina, Sofia Muravieva, Sofia Samodelkina, Elizaveta Tuktamysheva, Anastasia Zinina Aleksandra Boikova / Dmitrii Kozlovskii, Yasmina Kadyrova / Valerii Kolesov Sofia Tyutyunina / Andrei Bagin, Elizaveta Shanaeva / Pavel Drozd
Red Machine (Alina Zagitova)	Men; Women; Pairs; Ice Dance*	Petr Gumennik, Artem Kovalev, Gleb Lutfullin, Alexander Samarin Sofia Akateva, Alina Gorbacheva, Adeliia Petrosian, Veronika Yametova Anastasia Mishina / Aleksandr Galliamov, Evgenia Tarasova / Vladimir Morozov Elizaveta Khudaiberdieva / Egor Bazin, Vasilisa Kaganovskaia / Valeriy Angelopol

*Note: Ice dancers did not take part in the competition and did not contribute to the total point standing of the teams.

== Competition schedule ==
The competition was broadcast by Channel One Russia.

Listed in local time (UTC+03:00).

Day	Date	Start	Event
Day 1	January 21	17:00	Short Program
Day 2	January 22	16:30	Free skating

== Results ==
=== Team ===
Team results
Rank	Team name	Total points
1	Red Machine	2344.24
2	Not Gonna Get Us	2275.47

=== Men ===
Rank	Name	Team	Total points	SP		FS	
1	Andrei Mozalev	Not Gonna Get Us	282.14	1	104.36	3	177.78
2	Petr Gumennik	Red Machine	268.94	6	86.56	2	182.38
3	Gleb Lutfullin	Red Machine	264.66	2	94.06	5	170.60
4	Dmitri Aliev	Not Gonna Get Us	254.39	8	68.92	1	185.47
5	Artem Kovalev	Red Machine	249.74	7	78.15	4	171.59
6	Evgeni Semenenko	Not Gonna Get Us	246.15	5	88.18	6	157.97
7	Alexander Samarin	Red Machine	241.35	4	88.69	7	152.66
8	Makar Ignatov	Not Gonna Get Us	238.90	3	91.05	8	147.85

=== Women ===
Rank	Name	Team	Total points	SP		FS	
1	Sofia Akateva	Red Machine	252.12	3	74.37	1	177.75
2	Sofia Muravieva	Not Gonna Get Us	245.77	1	85.54	2	160.23
3	Adeliia Petrosian	Red Machine	240.22	2	83.80	3	156.42
4	Elizaveta Tuktamysheva	Not Gonna Get Us	230.67	4	74.32	4	156.35
5	Alina Gorbacheva	Red Machine	217.09	5	73.98	7	143.11
6	Sofia Samodelkina	Not Gonna Get Us	209.82	7	66.04	6	143.78
7	Veronika Yametova	Red Machine	146.17	6	69.56	5	146.17
8	Ksenia Gushchina	Not Gonna Get Us	122.76		-	8	122.76
WD	Anastasia Zinina	Not Gonna Get Us	withdrew	withdrew from competition			

=== Pairs ===
Rank	Name	Team	Total points	SP		FS	
1	Anastasia Mishina / Aleksandr Galliamov	Red Machine	234.37	1	86.09	3	148.28
2	Aleksandra Boikova / Dmitrii Kozlovskii	Not Gonna Get Us	232.40	2	81.72	1	150.68
3	Evgenia Tarasova / Vladimir Morozov	Red Machine	229.58	3	79.98	2	149.60
4	Yasmina Kadyrova / Valerii Kolesov	Not Gonna Get Us	212.47	4	78.18	4	134.29
