= Sofia Akateva =

Russian figure skater (born 2007)

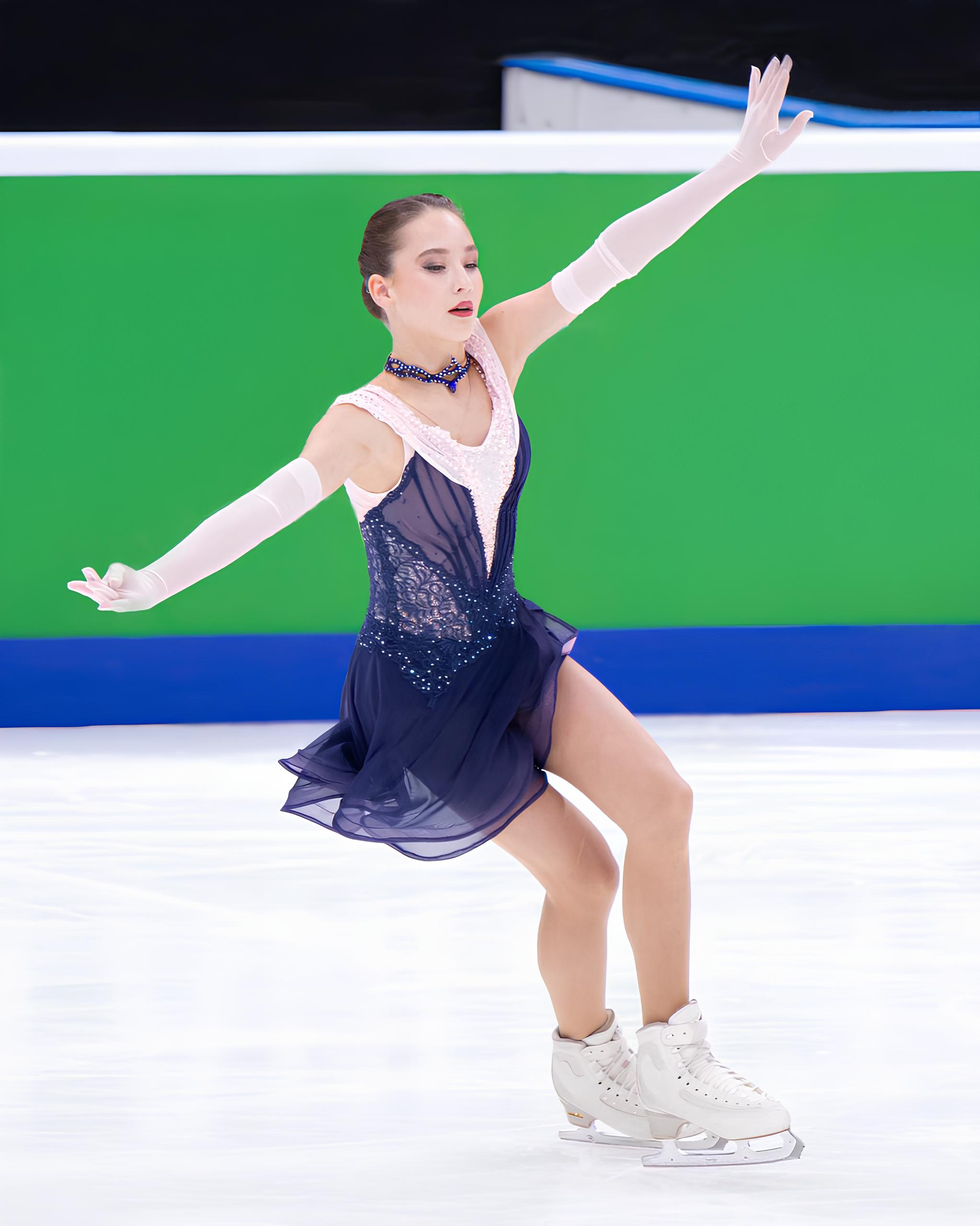
- Akateva at the 2023 Russian Test Skates

Personal information
- Native name: Софья Дмитриевна Акатьева (Russian)
- Full name: Sofia Dmitrievna Akateva
- Other names: Akatyeva, Akatieva
- Born: July 7, 2007 (age 19) Moscow, Russia
- Home town: Moscow
- Height: 1.65 m (5 ft 5 in)

Figure skating career
- Country: Russia
- Coach: Eteri Tutberidze; Sergei Dudakov
- Skating club: Sambo 70 (Khrustalny)
- Began skating: 2011

Medal record
Russian Championships
Gold medal – first place	2023 Krasnoyarsk	Singles

Sofia Dmitrievna Akateva (Russian: Софья Дмитриевна Акатьева, born 7 July 2007) is a Russian figure skater. She is the 2023 Russian champion. At the junior level, she is the 2021 JGP Russia champion, the 2021 JGP Poland champion, a two-time Russian junior national champion (2021, 2022), and currently holds the junior women's world records for the highest total and free skate scores.

Akateva is the 11th woman to land a quad jump and the 14th to land a triple Axel in international competition. She is the second woman after American skater Alysa Liu to land a quad jump and triple Axel in one program successfully.

== Personal life ==
Sofia was born on July 7 2007 in Moscow, Russia. Her mother is ethnically Bashkir and was born in Ufa, Bashkortostan. She completed her university education in Kazan.

== Career ==
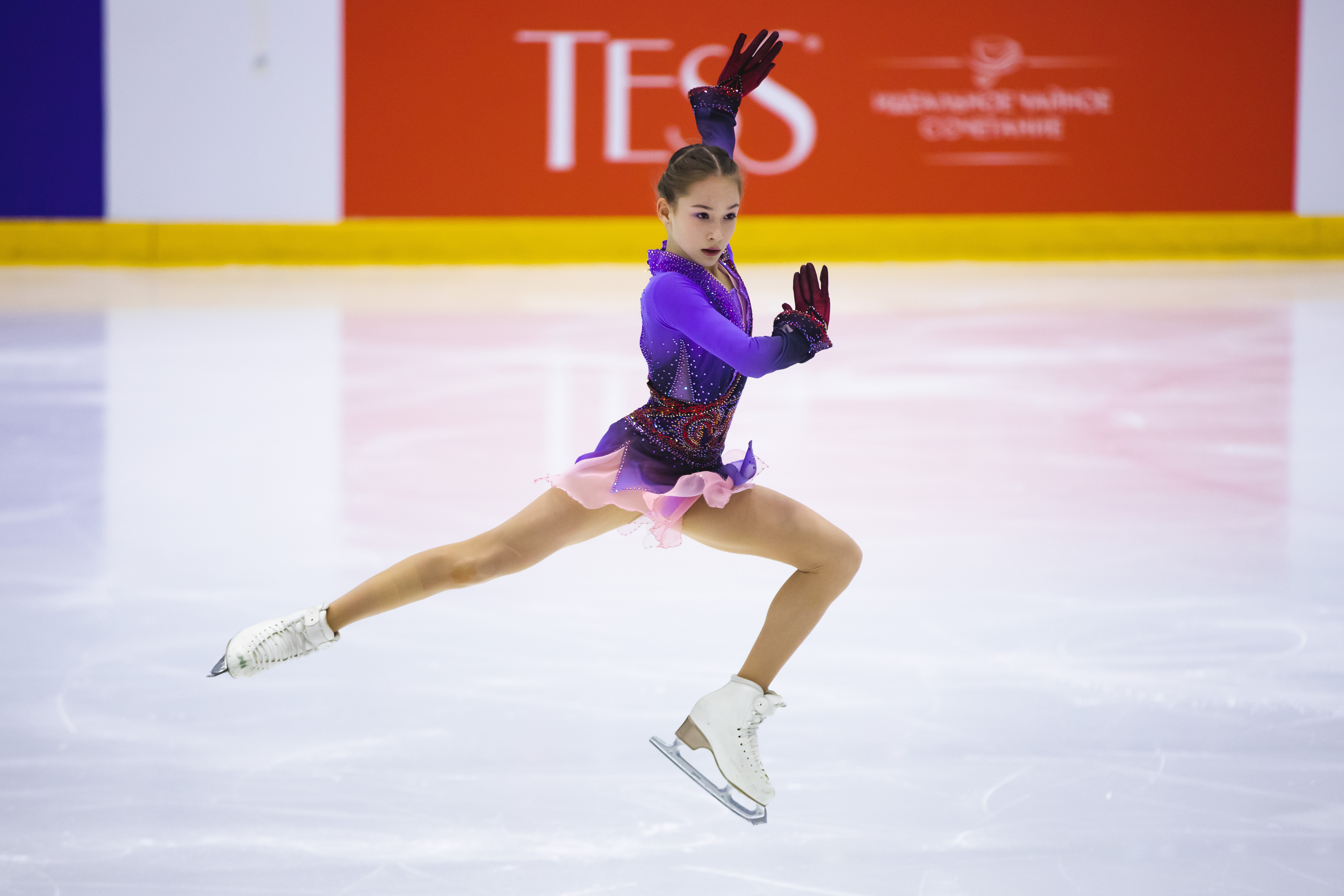
Sofia at the 2020 Russian Cup

=== Early years ===
Akateva began learning to skate in 2011 as a four-year-old at Sambo 70. She transitioned into the Khrustalnyi rink under her current coach Eteri Tutberidze's group within the Sambo 70 training complex in 2017.

Akateva began training her first quadruple jump, the quad toe loop, with the support of a harness in December 2018 and the triple Axel in January 2019. She landed her first attempts of both jumps independently in March and April 2019, respectively.

As a novice and domestic junior skater under Tutberidze, Akateva placed second at the 2019 Russian Youth Championships (Russia's equivalent of a novice national championship) behind her teammate Kamila Valieva. In 2020, she won the silver medal at the 2020 Russian Junior Championships, again behind Valieva, and won her first junior national title the following year at the 2021 edition. During the domestic Cup of Russia series held during the 2020–21 season, Akateva was lauded as the first female skater to land a triple Axel and two quadruple jumps in a program during her free skate.

=== 2021–22 season: International junior debut ===
Akateva made her junior international debut at the 2021 JGP Russia held in Krasnoyarsk in mid-September. At the event, she surpassed teammate Kamila Valieva's junior world record scores for the free program and total combined score and took the title by a comfortable 27 point margin ahead of silver medalist Anastasia Zinina. Across her two programs, Akateva landed two triple Axels, one in combination, and three quad jumps, the toe loop, and the Salchow, two in combination. She is the first woman to land three quads and a triple Axel in one program.

At her second JGP assignment, the 2021 JGP Poland, Akateva skated two clean programs, again executing two triple Axels and three quad jumps over the course of the competition to claim the title ahead of compatriot Elizaveta Kulikova and South Korean competitor Shin Ji-a. Due to her results over her two events, Akateva qualified to the 2021–22 Junior Grand Prix Final as the top-seeded competitor in the junior women's event. Akateva's results also automatically qualified her a spot in the senior-level 2022 Russian Championships, but she was barred from competing there by the Russian Figure Skating Federation as her birthday fell after the age-eligibility cutoff date.

In February 2022, Akateva handily won her second consecutive junior national title at the 2022 Russian Junior Championships. She placed first in both segments of competition to take the gold medal by an over 23-point margin ahead of silver medalist Sofia Samodelkina.

=== 2022–23 season: Russian national title ===
Akateva competed on the domestic Russian Grand Prix (in lieu of the ISU Grand Prix, as Russian skaters were banned from competing internationally due to the Russian Invasion Of Ukraine) Akateva was assigned to the first and fourth stages of the Russian Grand Prix series.

At the first stage of the Russian Grand Prix, Akateva ranked second in the short program with a score of 72.70. in the free skate she successfully landed a triple axel, and two quad toes, one of which was landed in combination with a double axel. She won the free skate and ranked second overall, 7.98 points behind Kamila Valieva.

At the fourth stage of the Russian Grand Prix, Akateva ranked second in the short program with a score of 83.39, before ranking third in both the free skate and the overalls, taking the bronze medal behind Elizaveta Tuktamysheva and Sofia Muravieva. Her results at the first and fourth stages of the Russian Grand Prix series qualified Akateva for the Russian Grand Prix Finale.

Akateva competed at the 2023 Russian Figure Skating Championships. She successfully landed a triple axel in the short program and ranked in first place. She ranked in second place in the free skate after falling on her opening triple axel, though she otherwise skated cleanly, landing two quad Toe loops and ranking in first place overall and winning the gold medal.

Akateva competed next at the 2023 Channel One Trophy where she was assigned to the team titled “The Red Machine” and was captained by Alina Zagitova. Akateva ranked in third place after the short program but landed a Triple Axel and both quad Toe loops in the free skate to rank in first place in the individual standings and help the Red Machine claim victory in the team standings.

Akateva’s last competition of the season was the 2023 Russian Grand Prix Final. She fell on her Triple Axel in the short program causing her to rank in fifth place and 10.22 points behind Adeliia Petrosian. She landed a Triple Axel and two quad Toe loops in the free skate, although both quads were marked as under-rotated and she moved up to only fourth place overall, missing out on a medal by only 0.52 points.

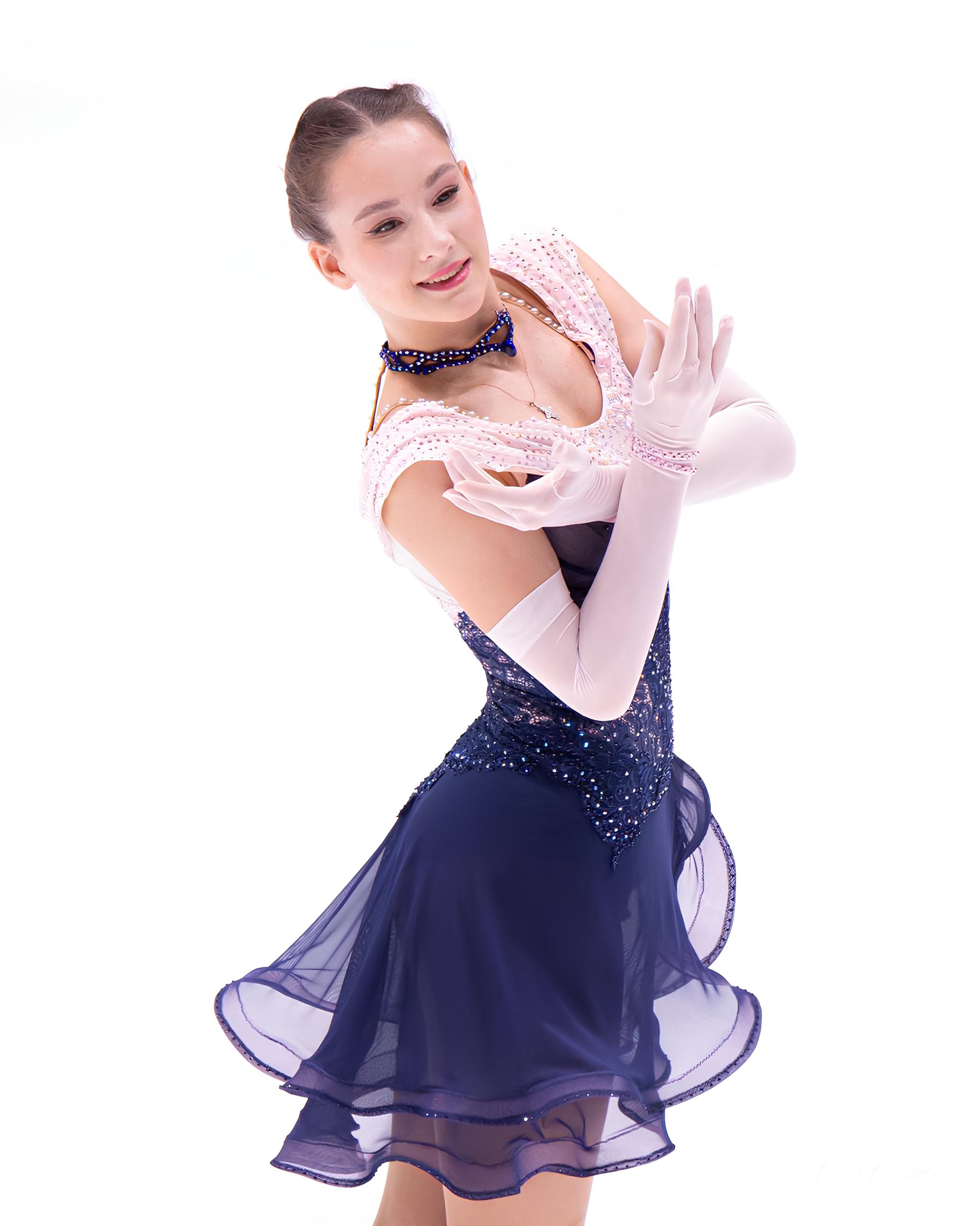
Sofia at Russian Test Skates 2024

In late June, Akateva was diagnosed with a stress fracture of the foot and had to suspend training. By late July she was able to resume training. She suffered a reoccurrence of the same injury in November, causing her to recovery to be prolonged. In the 2025 documentary series “The Tutberidze Method”, Tutberidze spoke about how Akateva sustained the injury, saying, “She got this injury because she was very unfocused during training. Her training process was always very difficult – it was necessary to convince, push, and motivate her.”

=== 2023–24 season: Injury ===
Although Akateva debuted two new programs at the 2023–24 Russian Test Skates, she did not compete at all during the 2023–24 season due to injury.

=== 2024–25 season: Return from injury ===
Akateva performed at the 2024–25 Russian Test Skates, confirming she would compete with her programs originally intended for the previous season. Her short program was set to the music Masquerade (Khachaturian) and her free skate was set to various pieces of music from the 2008 film Admiral.

The third stage of the Russian Grand Prix held in Krasnoyarsk in November 2024 marked Akateva’s first competition since March 2023. She ranked in third place in the short program behind Anna Frolova and Sofia Muravieva. In the free skate she popped her opening quad toe loop, her only quad attempt of the competition. She skated the rest of the program cleanly and ranked in third place overall winning the bronze medal behind Frolova and Alina Gorbacheva.

=== 2025–26 season ===
In November, Akateva competed at the Russian Grand Prix Stage 5 in Omsk where she finished in eighth place. Sofia was named to compete at the 2026 Russian National Championships in December. However, she withdrew due to injury.

=== 2026–27 season ===
During the off season, media outlets shared that Akateva was suffering foot injury problems, preventing her from preparing for the upcoming season.

Akateva opened the new season, and returned to competition for the first time in twelve months at the Russian Grand Prix stage in Omsk, placing eighth overall.

== Programs ==
Season	Short program	Free skating	Exhibition
2026–2027	Wild Garden of Eden by Polnalyubvi choreo. by Daniil Gleikhengauz	La terre vu du ciel by Armand Amar; Shadow Hunter by Power-Haus and Christian Reindl choreo. by Daniil Gleikhengauz	
2025–2026	Wild Garden of Eden by Polnalyubvi choreo. by Daniil Gleikhengauz	La terre vu du ciel by Armand Amar; Shadow Hunter by Power-Haus and Christian Reindl choreo. by Daniil Gleikhengauz	Clouds, The Mind on the (Re)Wind; Smiles for Y... by Ezio Bosso choreo. by Daniil Gleikhengauz
2024–2025	Masquerade Waltz by Aram Khachaturian choreo. by Daniil Gleikhengauz	Admiral by Gleb Matveychuk and Ruslan Muratov performed by Victoria Dayneko; Trinity by James Dooley choreo. by Daniil Gleikhengauz	Hijo de la Luna by José María Cano performed by Loona
2023–2024	Did not compete this season		
2022–2023	Clouds, The Mind on the (Re)Wind; Smiles for Y... by Ezio Bosso choreo. by Daniil Gleikhengauz	Welcome to Earth; Mosquito Bay (from Welcome to Earth) by Daniel Pemberton; Arrival of the Birds (from The Crimson Wing) by The Cinematic Orchestra choreo. by Daniil Gleikhengauz	Reflection (from Mulan) performed by Vanessa-Mae choreo. by Daniil Gleikhengauz; Hijo de la Luna by José María Cano performed by Loona
2021–2022	Clouds, The Mind on the (Re)Wind; Smiles for Y... by Ezio Bosso choreo. by Daniil Gleikhengauz	Reflection (from Mulan) performed by Vanessa-Mae choreo. by Daniil Gleikhengauz	
2020–2021	Seven Nation Army by The White Stripes performed by Postmodern Jukebox, feat. Haley Reinhart choreo. by Daniil Gleikhengauz	Reflection (from Mulan) performed by Vanessa-Mae choreo. by Daniil Gleikhengauz	
2019–2020	Can't Help Falling in Love performed by Haley Reinhart; Chocolate Jesus by Beth Hart and Joe Bonamassa choreo. by Daniil Gleikhengauz	Le Moulin; La Valse d'Amélie; Comptine d'un autre été: L'après-midi (from Amélie) by Yann Tiersen choreo. by Daniil Gleikhengauz	

== Competitive highlights ==
JGP: Junior Grand Prix; GPR: Grand Prix of Russia

International
Event	19–20	20–21	21–22	22–23	23–24	24–25
JGP Final			C			
JGP Poland			1st			
JGP Russia			1st			
National
Russian Champ.				1st		5th
Channel One Trophy				1st		
Russian Cup Final (Note: The 2023 Russian Cup Final was renamed as the 2023 Russian Grand Prix Final.)				4th		
Russian Junior Champ.	2nd	1st	1st			
TBD = Assigned; WD = Withdrew; C = Canceled; Levels: J = Junior

== Records and achievements ==
=== Junior world record scores ===
Akateva is currently the junior world record holder for the women's free program and total combined score.

Junior women's free program
Date	Score	Event	Note
18 September 2021	157.19	2021 JGP Russia	Current junior world record.
Junior women's total score
Date	Score	Event	Note
18 September 2021	233.08	2021 JGP Russia	Current junior world record.

• Akateva is the first woman to land a triple Axel and three quadruple jumps in one program.

== Detailed results ==
ISU personal best scores in the +5/-5 GOE System
Segment	Type	Score	Event
Total	**TSS**	**233.08**	2021 JGP Russia
Short program	**TSS**	**75.89**	2021 JGP Russia
Short program	TES	44.60	2021 JGP Russia
Short program	PCS	31.29	2021 JGP Russia
Free skating	**TSS**	**157.19**	2021 JGP Russia
Free skating	TES	94.57	2021 JGP Russia
Free skating	PCS	62.62	2021 JGP Russia

Small medals for short and free programs awarded only at ISU Championships. Personal bests highlighted in bold.
Although she participated in senior level competitions in Russia in the 2022–23 season, she is still considered a junior competitor according to the ISU classification.

=== Senior level ===
**2026–27 season**
**Date**	**Event**	SP	FS	**Total**
13–16 November 2026	2026 Cup of Russia, 5th Stage	9 62.14	7 125.66	8 187.80
**2025–26 season**
**Date**	**Event**	**SP**	**FS**	**Total**
21–24 November 2025	2025 Cup of Russia, 5th Stage	9 55.46	7 124.45	8 179.91
**2024–25 season**
Date	Event	SP	FS	Total
13–17 February 2025	2025 Russian Cup Final	5 74.09	11 121.83	11 195.92
19–22 December 2024	2025 Russian Figure Skating Championships	8; 71.62	4; 150.40	5; 222.02
23–24 November 2024	2024 Cup of Russia Series, 5th Stage	1; 75.54	5; 128.13	5; 203.67
9–10 November 2024	2024 Cup of Russia Series, 3rd Stage	3; 65.37	3; 143.26	3; 208.63
**2022–23 season**
Date	Event	SP	FS	Total
4–5 March 2023	2023 Russian Cup Final	5; 76.40	2; 164.69	4; 241.09
21–22 January 2023	2023 Channel One Trophy	3; 74.37	1; 177.75	1T/1P; 252.12
20–26 December 2022	2023 Russian Championships	1; 85.59	2; 164.15	1; 249.74
11–14 November 2022	2022 Cup of Russia Series, 4th Stage	2; 83.39	3; 141.98	3; 225.37
22–23 October 2022	2022 Cup of Russia Series, 1st Stage	2; 72.70	1; 163.98	2; 236.68

=== Junior level ===
**2021–22 season**
18–22 January 2022	2022 Russian Junior Championships	1; 78.84	1; 158.25	1; 237.09
29 September – 2 October 2021	2021 JGP Poland	1; 71.91	1; 153.73	1; 225.64
15–18 September 2021	2021 JGP Russia	1; **75.89**	1; **157.19**	1; **233.08**
**2020–21 season**
1–5 February 2021	2021 Russian Junior Championships	2; 72.80	1; 147.20	1; 220.00
**2019–20 season**
4–8 February 2020	2020 Russian Junior Championships	3; 69.22	2; 149.22	2; 218.44

World Junior Record Holders
Preceded by (Russia) Kamila Valieva	Women's Junior Free Skating; 18 September 2021 – present	Succeeded by Incumbent
Preceded by (Russia) Kamila Valieva	Women's Junior Total Score; 18 September 2021 – present	Succeeded by Incumbent
