= 2022 Channel One Trophy =

Russian domestic figure skating competition

- Type: Domestic competition
- Date: March 25 – March 27
- Season: 2021–22
- Location: Saransk, Russia
- Previous: 2021
- Next: 2023

The 2022 Channel One Trophy was a Russian domestic team figure skating competition held from 25 to 27 March 2022 in Saransk. It was held simultaneously with the 2022 World Figure Skating Championships, from which Russian (and Belarusian) figure skaters were excluded.

On March 11, Figure Skating Federation of Russia published the competition format. As the framework of the competition, a jump festival and a team tournament are planned, where two teams would compete for prizes. Anna Shcherbakova was chosen as the captain of the red team and Mark Kondratiuk as the captain of the blue team.

== Entries ==
Men	Women	Pairs	Ice dance
Mikhail Kolyada	Anna Shcherbakova	Evgenia Tarasova / Vladimir Morozov	Victoria Sinitsina / Nikita Katsalapov
Evgeni Semenenko	Kamila Valieva	Anastasia Mishina / Aleksandr Galliamov	Alexandra Stepanova / Ivan Bukin
Mark Kondratiuk	Elizaveta Tuktamysheva	Daria Pavliuchenko / Denis Khodykin	
Andrei Mozalev	Maya Khromykh	Aleksandra Boikova / Dmitrii Kozlovskii	
Alexander Samarin	Sofia Samodelkina		
Makar Ignatov	Sofia Akateva		
Petr Gumennik	Adeliia Petrosian		
	Veronika Zhilina		

== Teams ==
Teams
Team name	Event	Members
Time of Firsts (Mark Kondratiuk)	Men; Women; Pairs; Ice Dance*	Mark Kondratiuk, Alexander Samarin, Evgeni Semenenko, Petr Gumennik; Kamila Valieva, Elizaveta Tuktamysheva, Maya Khromykh; Anastasia Mishina / Aleksandr Galliamov, Daria Pavliuchenko / Denis Khodykin; Alexandra Stepanova / Ivan Bukin
Red Machine (Anna Shcherbakova)	Men; Women; Pairs; Ice Dance*	Makar Ignatov, Mikhail Kolyada, Andrei Mozalev; Anna Shcherbakova, Sofia Akateva, Adeliia Petrosian, Sofia Samodelkina; Evgenia Tarasova / Vladimir Morozov, Aleksandra Boikova / Dmitrii Kozlovskii; Victoria Sinitsina / Nikita Katsalapov

- Note: Ice dancers did not participate in the jumping festival.

== Competition schedule ==
The competition was broadcast by Channel One Russia.

Listed in local time (UTC+03:00).

Day	Date	Start	Event
Day 1	25 March	18:00	Jumping Festival
Day 2	26 March	17:00	Short Program
Day 3	27 March	17:00	Free skating

== Results ==
=== Team ===
Team results
Rank	Team name	Total points
1	Red Machine	145
2	Time of Firsts	141

=== Men ===
Rank	Name	Team	Total points	SP		FS	
1	Mikhail Kolyada	Red Machine	306.52	1	106.41	1	200.11
2	Mark Kondratiuk	Time of Firsts	293.15	3	97.89	2	195.26
3	Andrei Mozalev	Red Machine	279.92	5	89.12	3	190.80
4	Evgeni Semenenko	Time of Firsts	278.57	2	101.55	5	177.02
5	Makar Ignatov	Red Machine	226.75	4	89.43	6	137.32
-	Petr Gumennik	Time of Firsts		-	-	4	181.02
-	Alexander Samarin	Time of Firsts		6	84.21	-	-

=== Ladies ===
Rank	Name	Team	Total points	SP		FS	
1	Anna Shcherbakova	Red Machine	259.02	2	82.90	1	176.12
2	Kamila Valieva	Time of Firsts	257.51	1	83.63	2	173.88
3	Elizaveta Tuktamysheva	Time of Firsts	247.86	3	81.63	3	166.23
4	Sofia Samodelkina	Red Machine	219.99	6	74.68	4	145.31
5	Adeliia Petrosian	Red Machine	216.31	5	74.93	5	141.38
6	Maya Khromykh	Time of Firsts	197.37	4	75.07	6	122.30

=== Pairs ===
Rank	Name	Team	Total points	SP		FS	
1	Anastasia Mishina / Aleksandr Galliamov	Time of Firsts	246.77	2	85.24	2	161.53
2	Aleksandra Boikova / Dmitrii Kozlovskii	Red Machine	246.19	3	84.05	1	162.14
3	Evgenia Tarasova / Vladimir Morozov	Red Machine	246.09	1	86.36	3	159.73
4	Daria Pavliuchenko / Denis Khodykin	Time of Firsts	223.92	4	78.92	4	145.00

=== Ice dance ===
Rank	Name	Team	Total points	RD		FD	
1	Victoria Sinitsina / Nikita Katsalapov	Red Machine	231.32	1	93.48	1	137.84
2	Alexandra Stepanova / Ivan Bukin	Time of Firsts	223.21	2	89.97	2	133.24

== Prize money ==
On the first day, the red team that won the team jumping competition received a check for 3 million roubles, and the other team received a check for 2 million. Later, Mark Kondratiuk won the individual jumping competition, getting 500 thousand roubles.

On Sunday, the red team was handed a check for 10 million roubles for winning the cup, and the losing team was handed a check for 7.5 million roubles.

== See also ==
- 2021 Channel One Trophy
