= 2021 Channel One Trophy =

Russian domestic figure skating competition

- Type: Domestic competition
- Date: February 5 – 7
- Season: 2020–21
- Location: Moscow, Russia
- Host: Figure Skating Federation of Russia
- Venue: Megasport Sport Palace
- Next: 2022

The 2021 Channel One Trophy was a domestic figure skating competition held from February 5–7, 2021 in Moscow, Russia. Members of the 2021 Russian national team who placed in the top six at either the 2021 Russian Championships or the 2020 European Championships, or who'd previously won the World Championships in any of the four disciplines were invited to compete. Skaters competed against each other in two teams consisting of three men's single skaters, three ladies' single skaters, two pair teams, and three ice dance teams, randomly selected by team captains Evgenia Medvedeva and Alina Zagitova.

The competition was broadcast by Channel One Russia and was made available to international viewers via YouTube.

== Scoring ==
Skaters competed in both the short program/rhythm dance and the free skating/free dance segments for their team. Their individual scores for each program were added together to create a team total score.

== Entries ==
Channel One Russia announced the preliminary list of invitees on January 19, 2021.

Men	Ladies	Pairs	Ice dance
Dmitri Aliev	~~Alena Kostornaia~~	Aleksandra Boikova / Dmitrii Kozlovskii	Elizaveta Khudaiberdieva / Egor Bazin
Makar Ignatov	Anna Shcherbakova	Anastasia Mishina / Aleksandr Galliamov	Annabelle Morozov / Andrei Bagin
Mikhail Kolyada	Alexandra Trusova	Daria Pavliuchenko / Denis Khodykin	Sofia Shevchenko / Igor Eremenko
Mark Kondratiuk	Elizaveta Tuktamysheva	Evgenia Tarasova / Vladimir Morozov	Anastasia Skoptsova / Kirill Aleshin
Andrei Mozalev	Daria Usacheva		Alexandra Stepanova / Ivan Bukin
Alexander Samarin	Kamila Valieva		Tiffany Zahorski / Jonathan Guerreiro

=== Changes to preliminary entries ===
Date	Discipline	Withdrew	Added	Reason/Other notes	Refs
February 3 February 4	Ladies	Alena Kostornaia	Maiia Khromykh	Ongoing recovery from COVID-19	

== Teams ==
Teams
Team name	Event	Members
Time of Firsts (Evgenia Medvedeva)	Men; Ladies; Pairs; Ice dance	Mikhail Kolyada, Alexander Samarin, Mark Kondratiuk; Alexandra Trusova, Elizaveta Tuktamysheva, Maiia Khromykh; Aleksandra Boikova / Dmitrii Kozlovskii, Anastasia Mishina / Aleksandr Galliamov; Alexandra Stepanova / Ivan Bukin, Anastasia Skoptsova / Kirill Aleshin, Sofia Shevchenko / Igor Eremenko
Red Machine (Alina Zagitova)	Men; Ladies; Pairs; Ice dance	Dmitri Aliev, Makar Ignatov, Andrei Mozalev; Anna Shcherbakova, Kamila Valieva, Daria Usacheva; Evgenia Tarasova / Vladimir Morozov, Daria Pavliuchenko / Denis Khodykin; Tiffany Zahorski / Jonathan Guerreiro, Annabelle Morozov / Andrei Bagin, Elizaveta Khudaiberdieva / Egor Bazin

== Results ==
=== Team ===
Team results
Rank	Team name	Total points
1	Red Machine	2634.95
2	Time of Firsts	2606.21

=== Men ===
Rank	Name	Team	Total points	SP		FS	
1	Mikhail Kolyada	Time of Firsts	300.44	1	105.42	2	195.02
2	Mark Kondratiuk	Time of Firsts	293.12	3	96.89	1	196.23
3	Makar Ignatov	Red Machine	276.24	2	99.81	3	176.43
4	Dmitri Aliev	Red Machine	267.28	4	93.72	5	173.56
5	Andrei Mozalev	Red Machine	252.92	5	79.13	4	173.82
6	Alexander Samarin	Time of Firsts	244.11	6	78.07	6	166.04

=== Ladies ===
Rank	Name	Team	Total points	SP		FS	
1	Kamila Valieva	Red Machine	269.44	1	90.25	1	179.19
2	Anna Shcherbakova	Red Machine	251.95	2	82.89	2	169.06
3	Alexandra Trusova	Time of Firsts	241.19	4	77.86	3	163.33
4	Daria Usacheva	Red Machine	235.88	3	80.84	4	155.04
5	Elizaveta Tuktamysheva	Time of Firsts	220.79	6	70.38	5	150.41
6	Maiia Khromykh	Time of Firsts	211.80	5	75.05	6	136.75

=== Pairs ===
Rank	Name	Team	Total points	SP		FS	
1	Evgenia Tarasova / Vladimir Morozov	Red Machine	242.06	1	83.61	1	158.45
2	Anastasia Mishina / Aleksandr Galliamov	Time of Firsts	236.54	2	80.24	2	156.30
3	Aleksandra Boikova / Dmitrii Kozlovskii	Time of Firsts	228.90	3	77.80	3	151.10
4	Daria Pavliuchenko / Denis Khodykin	Red Machine	219.31	4	75.73	4	143.58

=== Ice dance ===
Rank	Name	Team	Total points	RD		FD	
1	Alexandra Stepanova / Ivan Bukin	Time of Firsts	224.95	1	90.75	1	134.20
2	Tiffany Zahorski / Jonathan Guerreiro	Red Machine	213.81	2	85.76	2	128.05
3	Anastasia Skoptsova / Kirill Aleshin	Time of Firsts	204.76	3	81.42	3	123.34
4	Annabelle Morozov / Andrei Bagin	Red Machine	203.81	4	80.54	4	123.27
5	Elizaveta Khudaiberdieva / Egor Bazin	Red Machine	202.22	5	79.13	5	123.09
6	Sofia Shevchenko / Igor Eremenko	Time of Firsts	199.61	6	79.04	6	120.57
