= 2023 Russian Figure Skating Championships =

- Type: National championship
- Date: 20–25 December 2022 (S); 14–18 February 2023 (J)
- Season: 2022–23
- Location: Krasnoyarsk (S); Perm (J)
- Host: Figure Skating Federation of Russia
- Venue: Platinum Arena (S); Universal Sports Palace Molot (J)

Champions
- Men's singles: Evgeni Semenenko (S); Arseny Fedotov (J)
- Women's singles: Sofia Akateva (S); Alina Gorbacheva (J)
- Pairs: Aleksandra Boikova / Dmitrii Kozlovskii (S); Ekaterina Chikmareva / Matvei Ianchenkov (J)
- Ice dance: Elizaveta Khudaiberdieva / Egor Bazin (S); Anna Shcherbakova / Egor Goncharov (J)
- Previous: 2022 Russian Championships
- Next: 2024 Russian Championships

The 2023 Russian Figure Skating Championships (Russian: Чемпионат России по фигурному катанию на коньках 2023) were held from 20 to 25 December 2022 in Krasnoyarsk. Medals were awarded in the disciplines of men's singles, women's singles, pairs, and ice dance.

== Qualifying ==
In the 2022–23 season, Russian skaters competed in domestic qualifying events and national championships for various age levels. The Russian Cup series, renamed this year as the "Russian Grand Prix" for senior skaters and the "All-Russian competitions" for junior skaters, leads to four events – the Russian Championships, the Russian Junior Championships, the Russian Grand Prix Final and the All-Russian final competitions "Federation Cup".

From March 1, 2022 onwards, the International Skating Union banned all figure skaters and officials from Russia and Belarus from attending any international competitions following the 2022 Russian invasion of Ukraine. As a result, all skaters were required to qualify through the Russian Grand Prix and the All-Russian competitions' series.

Date	Event	Type	Location	Details
18–24 October 2022	Russian Grand Prix; Golden Skate of Moscow	Qualifier	Moscow	Details; Details
26–31 October 2022	Russian Grand Prix; Velvet Season	Qualifier	Sochi, Krasnodar Krai	Details; Details
2–7 November 2022	Russian Grand Prix; Idel–2022	Qualifier	Kazan, Tatarstan	Details; Details
8–14 November 2022	Russian Grand Prix; Moscow Stars–2022	Qualifier	Moscow	Details; Details
16–21 November 2022	Russian Grand Prix; Volga Pirouette	Qualifier	Samara, Samara Oblast	Details; Details
23–28 November 2022	Russian Grand Prix; For the prizes of the Governor of the Perm Krai	Qualifier	Perm, Perm Krai	Details; Details
20–25 December 2022	2023 Russian Championships	Final	Krasnoyarsk, Krasnoyarsk Krai	Details
14–18 February 2023	2023 Russian Junior Championships	Final	Perm, Perm Krai	Details
1–5 March 2023	2023 Russian Grand Prix Final; 2023 Federation Cup	Final	Saint Petersburg (Note: Originally scheduled to be held in Sochi, Krasnodar Krai.)	Details; Details
9–13 March 2023	2023 Russian Youth Championships – Younger Age	Final	Yoshkar-Ola, Mari El	Details
30 March–4 April 2023	2023 Russian Youth Championships – Elder Age	Final	Saransk, Mordovia	Details

== Medalists of most important competitions ==
Senior Championships
Discipline	Gold	Silver	Bronze
Men	Evgeni Semenenko	Petr Gumennik	Alexander Samarin
Women	Sofia Akateva	Elizaveta Tuktamysheva	Sofia Muravieva
Pairs	Aleksandra Boikova / Dmitrii Kozlovskii	Anastasia Mishina / Aleksandr Galliamov	Evgenia Tarasova / Vladimir Morozov
Ice dance	Elizaveta Khudaiberdieva / Egor Bazin	Elizaveta Shanaeva / Pavel Drozd	Elizaveta Pasechnik / Maxim Nekrasov
Junior Championships
Discipline	Gold	Silver	Bronze
Men	Arseny Fedotov	Lev Lazarev	Grigory Fedorov
Women	Alina Gorbacheva	Veronika Zhilina	Maria Gordeeva
Pairs	Ekaterina Chikmareva / Matvei Ianchenkov	Iuliia Artemeva / Aleksei Briukhanov	Elizaveta Osokina / Artem Gritsaenko
Ice dance	Anna Shcherbakova / Egor Goncharov	Sofia Leontieva / Daniil Gorelkin	Ekaterina Rybakova / Ivan Makhnonosov
Russian Grand Prix Final and All-Russian final competitions "Federation Cup"
Discipline	Gold	Silver	Bronze
Men	Petr Gumennik	Dmitri Aliev	Mark Kondratiuk
Women	Adeliia Petrosian	Elizaveta Tuktamysheva	Sofia Akateva
Pairs	Aleksandra Boikova / Dmitrii Kozlovskii	Anastasia Mishina / Aleksandr Galliamov	Evgenia Tarasova / Vladimir Morozov
Ice dance	Vasilisa Kaganovskaia / Valeriy Angelopol	Elizaveta Shanaeva / Pavel Drozd	Sofya Tyutyunina / Andrei Bagin
Junior men	Arseny Fedotov	Nikita Sarnovskiy	Semyon Soloviev
Junior women	Veronika Zhilina	Daria Sadkova	Maria Gordeeva
Junior pairs	Ekaterina Chikmareva / Matvei Ianchenkov	Elizaveta Osokina / Artem Gritsaenko	Anastasia Chernyshova / Vladislav Antonyshev
Junior ice dance	Sofia Leontieva / Daniil Gorelkin	Anna Kolomenskaya / Artem Frolov	Ekaterina Rybakova / Ivan Makhnonosov
Youth Championships – Elder Age
Discipline	Gold	Silver	Bronze
Men	Nikolay Kolesnikov	Ivan Ramzenkov	Vadim Voronov
Women	Margarita Bazyliuk	Daria Sadkova	Elena Kostyleva
Pairs	Veronika Merenkova / Danil Galimov	Maria Simonova / Martin Breslavskiy	Elizaveta Romanova / Valeriy Nazarov
Ice dance	Elizaveta Maleina / Matvei Samokhin	Aleksandra Shinkarenko / Vladislav Mikhailov	Arina Gorshenina / Ilya Makarov
Youth Championships – Younger Age
Discipline	Gold	Silver	Bronze
Men	Vadim Voronov	Roman Khamzin	Georgiy Likhachyov
Women	Elena Kostyleva	Alena Prineva	Margarita Bazyliuk
Pairs	No pairs' discipline		
Ice dance	No ice dance discipline		

== Senior Championships ==
The 2023 Russian Championships were held in Krasnoyarsk from 20 to 25 December 2022. Qualification is based on Russian Grand Prix series' results. In addition, figure skaters who were included in official pre-season national team roster but were unable to participate at the Russian Grand Prix series due to good reasons, can be included into list of participants by decision of the Executive Committee of the Figure Skating Federation of Russia.

=== Schedule ===
Listed in local time (UTC+07:00).

Day	Date	Start	Finish	Discipline	Event
Day 1	22 December	14:00	16:10	Ice dance	Rhythm dance
Day 1	22 December	16:30	19:00	Men	Short program
Day 1	22 December	19:15	19:45		Opening ceremony
Day 1	22 December	20:00	21:55	Pairs	Short program
Day 2	23 December	13:30	16:00	Ice dance	Free dance
Day 2	23 December	16:15	19:05	Men	Free skating
Day 2	23 December	19:25	21:55	Women	Short program
Day 3	24 December	16:30	18:35	Pairs	Free skating
Day 3	24 December	19:00	21:55	Women	Free skating
Day 4	25 December	13:00	13:45		Victory ceremonies
Day 4	25 December	14:00	16:30		Exhibition gala

=== Preliminary entries ===
The Figure Skating Federation of Russia published the official list of participants on 14 December 2022.

Men	Women	Pairs	Ice dance
Dmitri Aliev	Kamila Valieva	Anastasia Mishina / Aleksandr Galliamov	Elizaveta Khudaiberdieva / Egor Bazin
Evgeni Semenenko	Elizaveta Tuktamysheva	Aleksandra Boikova / Dmitrii Kozlovskii	~~Annabelle Morozov / Devid Naryzhnyy~~ (withdrew)
Gleb Lutfullin	Sofia Samodelkina	Evgenia Tarasova / Vladimir Morozov	Sofya Tyutyunina / Andrei Bagin
Mark Kondratiuk	Sofia Muravieva	Natalia Khabibullina / Ilya Knyazhuk	Vasilisa Kaganovskaia / Valeriy Angelopol
Petr Gumennik	Sofia Akateva	Yasmina Kadyrova / Valerii Kolesov	Elizaveta Shanaeva / Pavel Drozd
Alexander Samarin	Alexandra Trusova	Iuliia Artemeva / Aleksei Briukhanov	Irina Khavronina / Dario Cirisano
Andrei Mozalev	Veronika Yametova	Ekaterina Chikmareva / Matvei Ianchenkov	Elizaveta Pasechnik / Maxim Nekrasov
Ilya Yablokov	Kseniia Sinitsyna	Anastasia Mukhortova / Dmitry Evgenyev	Polina Usova / Mikhail Antonov
Alexey Erokhov	Anastasia Zinina	Daria Boyarintseva / Roman Pleshkov	Ekaterina Mironova / Evgenii Ustenko
~~Mikhail Kolyada~~ (withdrew)	Alina Gorbacheva	Viktoria Vasilieva / Roman Zaporozhets	Alexandra Kravchenko / Alexander Shustitskiy
Artem Kovalev	Ksenia Gushchina	~~Ekaterina Geynish / Dmitrii Chigirev~~ (withdrew)	Yana Matveishina / Timofey Subbotin
Ivan Popov	Sofia Zakharova	Elizaveta Osokina / Artem Gritsaenko	Alisa Krainyukova / Semyon Netsev
Makar Ignatov	Anna Frolova		Alexandra Prokopets / Alexander Vaskovich
Artur Danielian	Viktoria Fedyanina		Varvara Zhdanova / Timur Babaev-Smirnov
Matvei Vetlugin	Maria Paramonova		Elizaveta Kirillova / Mark Chegodaev
Andrei Anisimov	Adeliia Petrosian		
Vladislav Katichev	Agneta Latushkina		
Roman Atoyar	Viktoria Nesterova		
Substitutes
Vladimir Oshchepkov	Polina Sviridenko	Varvara Cheremnykh / Daniil Butenko (added)	Vlada Pavlenina / Aleksandr Aleksanyan (added)
Daniil Samsonov	Sofia Chaplygina	Maria Dybkova / Alexei Khvalko	Ekaterina Khrabrykh / Miron Suslov

==== Changes to preliminary entries ====
Date	Discipline	Withdrew	Added	Reason/Other notes	Refs
1 December; 14 December	Ice dance	Annabelle Morozov / Devid Naryzhnyy	Vlada Pavlenina / Aleksandr Aleksanyan	Split	
14 December	Pairs	Ekaterina Geynish / Dmitrii Chigirev	Varvara Cheremnykh / Daniil Butenko		
17 December	Men	Mikhail Kolyada	None	Exacerbation of chronic sinusitis	

=== Results ===
==== Men ====
Rank	Name	Total points	SP		FS	
1	Evgeni Semenenko	295.07	2	99.15	1	195.92
2	Petr Gumennik	295.07	1	104.47	2	190.60
3	Alexander Samarin	282.40	5	96.57	3	185.83
4	Dmitri Aliev	272.57	9	90.85	4	181.72
5	Artem Kovalev	268.52	6	96.49	5	172.03
6	Andrei Mozalev	267.90	3	98.70	6	169.20
7	Makar Ignatov	261.07	7	94.29	8	166.78
8	Gleb Lutfullin	251.41	10	84.09	7	167.32
9	Ivan Popov	239.39	13	77.02	9	162.37
10	Matvei Vetlugin	237.00	4	97.58	14	139.42
11	Ilya Yablokov	233.68	8	93.27	13	140.41
12	Artur Danielian	231.82	14	74.65	10	157.17
13	Alexey Erokhov	225.40	11	77.75	12	147.65
14	Andrei Anisimov	221.84	16	73.69	11	148.15
15	Vladislav Katichev	189.85	15	74.38	15	115.47
16	Roman Atoyar	181.87	17	73.48	16	108.39
WD	Mark Kondratiuk	withdrew	12	77.50	withdrew from competition	

==== Women ====
- The former silver medalist Kamila Valieva was disqualified for violation of anti-doping rules.

Rank	Name	Total points	SP		FS	
1	Sofia Akateva	249.74	1	85.59	1	164.15
2	Elizaveta Tuktamysheva	241.72	2	82.98	2	158.74
3	Sofia Muravieva	235.96	3	79.96	4	156.00
4	Adeliia Petrosian	235.72	4	76.25	3	159.47
5	Anastasia Zinina	217.39	8	71.40	5	145.99
6	Veronika Yametova	215.94	6	74.45	7	141.49
7	Kseniia Sinitsyna	211.52	5	74.89	8	136.63
8	Alina Gorbacheva	209.22	12	67.22	6	142.00
9	Ksenia Gushchina	203.14	11	67.64	9	135.50
10	Sofia Samodelkina	199.72	7	71.64	10	128.08
11	Anna Frolova	194.72	10	67.84	11	126.88
12	Sofia Zakharova	193.67	9	68.21	12	125.46
13	Maria Paramonova	188.01	13	67.14	13	120.87
14	Viktoria Fedyanina	176.51	14	60.96	14	115.15
15	Viktoria Nesterova	161.89	16	51.50	15	110.39
16	Agneta Latushkina	145.10	15	52.84	16	92.26
WD	Alexandra Trusova	withdrew	withdrew from competition			
DSQ *	Kamila Valieva	~~247.32~~	DSQ	~~76.61~~	DSQ	~~170.71~~

==== Pairs ====
Rank	Name	Total points	SP		FS	
1	Aleksandra Boikova / Dmitrii Kozlovskii	234.39	2	84.32	1	150.07
2	Anastasia Mishina / Aleksandr Galliamov	233.88	1	85.37	2	148.51
3	Evgenia Tarasova / Vladimir Morozov	218.60	3	81.23	3	137.37
4	Yasmina Kadyrova / Valerii Kolesov	213.45	4	76.68	4	136.77
5	Ekaterina Chikmareva / Matvei Ianchenkov	211.44	5	76.34	5	135.10
6	Natalia Khabibullina / Ilya Knyazhuk	209.53	6	74.89	6	134.64
7	Daria Boyarintseva / Roman Pleshkov	208.26	7	74.74	7	133.52
8	Anastasia Mukhortova / Dmitry Evgenyev	202.12	8	72.01	8	130.11
9	Elizaveta Osokina / Artem Gritsaenko	196.18	10	68.13	9	128.05
10	Iuliia Artemeva / Aleksei Briukhanov	194.19	9	70.20	10	123.99
11	Varvara Cheremnykh / Daniil Butenko	186.73	11	67.44	11	119.29
12	Viktoria Vasilieva / Roman Zaporozhets	154.42	12	59.77	12	94.65

==== Ice dance ====
Rank	Name	Total points	RD		FD	
1	Elizaveta Khudaiberdieva / Egor Bazin	203.46	1	83.70	1	119.76
2	Elizaveta Shanaeva / Pavel Drozd	197.59	2	79.60	2	117.99
3	Elizaveta Pasechnik / Maxim Nekrasov	195.52	3	79.48	3	116.04
4	Sofya Tyutyunina / Andrei Bagin	188.19	4	75.99	4	112.20
5	Ekaterina Mironova / Evgenii Ustenko	180.01	7	71.06	5	108.95
6	Alexandra Prokopets / Alexander Vaskovich	175.28	6	71.22	6	104.06
7	Alexandra Kravchenko / Alexander Shustitskiy	165.01	8	67.65	7	97.36
8	Varvara Zhdanova / Timur Babaev-Smirnov	160.04	9	64.21	8	95.83
9	Polina Usova / Mikhail Antonov	158.93	10	63.77	10	95.16
10	Vlada Pavlenina / Aleksandr Aleksanyan	157.54	11	61.81	9	95.73
11	Yana Matveishina / Timofey Subbotin	143.29	12	55.99	11	87.30
12	Alisa Krainyukova / Semyon Netsev	132.88	13	51.97	12	80.91
13	Elizaveta Kirillova / Mark Chegodaev	127.09	14	49.69	13	77.40
WD	Irina Khavronina / Dario Cirisano	withdrew	5	75.27	withdrew from competition	
WD	Vasilisa Kaganovskaia / Valeriy Angelopol	withdrew	withdrew from competition			

== Junior Championships ==
The 2023 Russian Junior Championships (Russian: Первенство России среди юниоров 2023) were held in Perm from 14 to 18 February 2023. Qualification was based on results of the All-Russian competitions' series (which were held alongside the Russian Grand Prix series among senior skaters). In addition, figure skaters who were included in the official pre-season national team roster but were unable to participate at the All-Russian competitions' series due to good reasons, were included into list of participants by decision of the Executive Committee of the Figure Skating Federation of Russia.

=== Schedule ===
Listed in local time (UTC+05:00).

Day	Date	Start	Finish	Discipline	Event
Day 1	15 February	14:00	16:20	Men	Short program
Day 1	15 February	16:40	17:10		Opening ceremony
Day 1	15 February	17:10	19:30	Women	Short program
Day 1	15 February	19:45	21:50	Ice dance	Rhythm dance
Day 2	16 February	13:15	15:50	Men	Free skating
Day 2	16 February	16:05	16:15		Victory ceremony
Day 2	16 February	16:15	18:00	Pairs	Short program
Day 2	16 February	18:15	20:50	Women	Free skating
Day 2	16 February	21:00	21:15		Victory ceremony
Day 3	17 February	12:00	14:15	Ice dance	Free dance
Day 3	17 February	14:30	14:40		Victory ceremony
Day 3	17 February	14:40	16:30	Pairs	Free skating
Day 3	17 February	16:45	17:00		Victory ceremony

=== Preliminary entries ===
Men	Women	Pairs	Ice dance
Arseny Fedotov	Veronika Zhilina	Ekaterina Chikmareva / Matvei Ianchenkov	Sofia Leontieva / Daniil Gorelkin
Grigory Fedorov	Sofya Titova	Iuliia Artemeva / Aleksei Briukhanov	Anna Shcherbakova / Egor Goncharov
Lev Lazarev	~~Alisa Dvoeglazova~~ (withdrew)	Anna Moskaleva / Maxim Lozhkin	Anna Kolomenskaya / Artem Frolov
Nikolai Ugozhaev	Lyubov Rubtsova	Maya Shegay / Igor Shamshurov	Anna Rumak / Gleb Goncharov
Fedor Zonov	Elizaveta Labutina	Anastasia Egorova / Rodion Marinskiy	Vasilisa Grigoreva / Evgeni Artyushchenko
Semyon Soloviev	Elizaveta Kulikova	Maria Dybkova / Alexei Khvalko	Yulia Churkina / Boris Frolov
Andrei Kutovoi	Agata Petrova	Elizaveta Osokina / Artem Gritsaenko	Elizaveta Shichina / Gordey Khubulov
Nikita Sarnovskiy	Alisa Yurova	Elizaveta Romanova / Valeriy Nazarov	Sofia Aleksova / Ilya Vladimirov
Eduard Karartynian	Victoria Morozova	~~Varvara Cheremnykh / Daniil Butenko~~ (withdrew)	Milana Kuzmina / Dmitrii Studenikin
Vladislav Dikidzhi	Lidia Pleskachova	Anastasia Chernyshova / Vladislav Antonyshev	Arina Gorshenina / Ilya Makarov
Kirill Sarnovskiy	Nadezhda Ponteleenko	~~Evgenia Bashina / Dmitry Sheremet~~ (withdrew)	~~Elizaveta Maleina / Grigory Rodin~~ (withdrew)
Nikolay Loginov	Daria Sadkova	Sofia Khisamutdinova / Lev Tsekhanovich	Aleksandra Shinkarenko / Vladislav Mikhailov
Arseny Dimitriev	~~Taisiia Korobitsina~~ (withdrew)		Maria Sorokina / Arseny Antropov
Maxim Avtushenko	Taisiia Shcherbinina		Ulyana Ermakova / Artem Krylov
Kirill Andrusik	Maria Gordeeva		~~Polina Pilipenko / Pavel Drako~~ (withdrew)
Aleksandr Golubev	Dina Khusnutdinova		
Timofei Stolyarenko	Maria Agaeva		
Mikhail Polyanskiy	Milana Lebedeva		
Substitutes
Kirill Kropylev	Anastasia Marasanova (added)	Alisa Blinnikova / Artem Panov	Valeria Kamaeva / Lev Sergeev
Nikita Malyutin	Maria Mazur	Eva Khmelkova / Andrei Rud (added, but withdrew)	Alisa Ovsiankina / Matvei Samokhin
	Alina Gorbacheva (added)		Ekaterina Rybakova / Ivan Makhnonosov (added)
			Varvara Kurnosenko / Fedor Varlamov (added)

==== Changes to preliminary entries ====
Date	Discipline	Withdrew	Added	Reason/Other notes	Refs
5 January; 11 February	Ice dance	Elizaveta Maleina / Grigory Rodin	Ekaterina Rybakova / Ivan Makhnonosov	Split	
11 February	Women	Alisa Dvoeglazova	Anastasia Marasanova	Knee injury	
11 February	Women	Taisiia Korobitsina	Alina Gorbacheva	Decision of the Executive Committee of the FSR	
11 February	Pairs	Varvara Cheremnykh / Daniil Butenko	Eva Khmelkova / Andrei Rud	Stress fracture in Cheremnykh's finger	
11 February	Pairs	Evgenia Bashina / Dmitry Sheremet	None	Decision of the Executive Committee of the FSR	
11 February	Ice dance	Polina Pilipenko / Pavel Drako	Varvara Kurnosenko / Fedor Varlamov	Decision of the Executive Committee of the FSR	
14 February	Pairs	Eva Khmelkova / Andrei Rud	None		

=== Results ===
==== Men ====
Rank	Name	Total points	SP		FS	
1	Arseny Fedotov	267.42	1	87.81	1	179.61
2	Lev Lazarev	263.50	2	85.69	2	177.81
3	Grigory Fedorov	243.62	5	81.76	3	161.86
4	Nikita Sarnovskiy	240.54	6	80.90	4	159.64
5	Vladislav Dikidzhi	240.45	3	81.98	5	158.47
6	Nikolai Ugozhaev	234.93	4	81.78	6	153.15
7	Eduard Karartynian	225.17	11	74.45	7	150.72
8	Nikolay Loginov	221.39	13	72.30	8	149.09
9	Andrei Kutovoi	221.28	10	74.70	9	146.58
10	Fedor Zonov	218.96	12	74.02	10	144.94
11	Semyon Soloviev	215.58	7	79.50	15	136.08
12	Mikhail Polyanskiy	215.00	14	71.83	11	143.17
13	Kirill Sarnovskiy	213.82	8	76.53	14	137.29
14	Maxim Avtushenko	208.53	16	69.70	13	138.83
15	Arseny Dimitriev	207.72	17	66.88	12	140.84
16	Kirill Andrusik	206.41	9	74.92	17	131.49
17	Timofei Stolyarenko	203.93	15	71.50	16	132.43
18	Aleksandr Golubev	182.67	18	66.13	18	116.54

==== Women ====
Rank	Name	Total points	SP		FS	
1	Alina Gorbacheva	224.41	1	74.51	2	149.90
2	Veronika Zhilina	218.79	9	66.94	1	151.85
3	Maria Gordeeva	213.02	4	68.27	3	144.75
4	Sofya Titova	200.73	16	60.01	4	140.72
5	Nadezhda Ponteleenko	195.56	8	66.94	6	128.62
6	Lyubov Rubtsova	195.50	6	67.48	7	128.02
7	Elizaveta Kulikova	195.34	5	67.88	10	127.46
8	Daria Sadkova	194.55	2	71.46	14	123.09
9	Milana Lebedeva	194.05	10	66.14	8	127.91
10	Elizaveta Labutina	194.04	13	64.65	5	129.39
11	Victoria Morozova	191.61	12	64.94	11	126.67
12	Agata Petrova	191.52	3	68.81	15	122.71
13	Alisa Yurova	190.85	7	67.22	13	123.63
14	Taisiia Shcherbinina	184.49	11	65.25	17	119.24
15	Maria Agaeva	183.52	14	61.64	16	121.88
16	Lidia Pleskachova	182.59	17	54.91	9	127.68
17	Anastasia Marasanova	180.17	18	54.75	12	125.42
18	Dina Khusnutdinova	179.59	15	60.92	18	118.67

==== Pairs ====
Rank	Name	Total points	SP		FS	
1	Ekaterina Chikmareva / Matvei Ianchenkov	208.68	1	78.41	2	130.27
2	Iuliia Artemeva / Aleksei Briukhanov	202.98	2	72.57	1	130.41
3	Elizaveta Osokina / Artem Gritsaenko	198.68	3	72.05	3	126.63
4	Anastasia Chernyshova / Vladislav Antonyshev	190.61	4	67.60	4	123.01
5	Maria Dybkova / Alexei Khvalko	175.78	6	62.38	6	113.40
6	Elizaveta Romanova / Valeriy Nazarov	175.27	5	64.60	8	110.67
7	Anna Moskaleva / Maxim Lozhkin	174.82	8	60.00	5	114.82
8	Anastasia Egorova / Rodion Marinskiy	164.89	10	53.85	7	111.04
9	Maya Shegay / Igor Shamshurov	162.98	7	61.95	9	101.03
10	Sofia Khisamutdinova / Lev Tsekhanovich	151.97	9	55.94	10	96.03

==== Ice dance ====
Rank	Name	Total points	RD		FD	
1	Anna Shcherbakova / Egor Goncharov	181.80	2	71.87	1	109.93
2	Sofia Leontieva / Daniil Gorelkin	180.98	1	72.94	2	108.04
3	Ekaterina Rybakova / Ivan Makhnonosov	171.75	3	68.62	4	103.13
4	Anna Kolomenskaya / Artem Frolov	168.91	6	64.41	3	104.50
5	Anna Rumak / Gleb Goncharov	167.18	4	66.81	5	100.37
6	Milana Kuzmina / Dmitrii Studenikin	163.19	5	64.71	6	98.48
7	Vasilisa Grigoreva / Evgeni Artyushchenko	160.54	7	64.15	7	96.39
8	Sofia Aleksova / Ilya Vladimirov	157.46	9	62.80	8	94.66
9	Elizaveta Shichina / Gordey Khubulov	157.01	8	63.75	10	93.26
10	Ulyana Ermakova / Artem Krylov	153.19	12	58.62	9	94.57
11	Varvara Kurnosenko / Fedor Varlamov	151.60	11	59.61	11	91.99
12	Arina Gorshenina / Ilya Makarov	146.06	13	58.51	12	87.55
13	Aleksandra Shinkarenko / Vladislav Mikhailov	142.95	14	57.37	13	85.58
14	Maria Sorokina / Arseny Antropov	134.36	15	51.79	14	82.57
WD	Yulia Churkina / Boris Frolov	withdrew	10	60.18	withdrew from competition	

== International team selections ==
=== Winter World University Games ===
The 2023 Winter World University Games were held in Lake Placid, United States from 12 to 22 January 2023. However, on 12 March 2022, in accordance with a recommendation by the International Olympic Committee (IOC), FISU's Steering Committee suspended the participation of Russia from FISU competitions and activities due to the 2022 Russian invasion of Ukraine.

=== European Youth Olympic Winter Festival ===
The 2023 European Youth Olympic Winter Festival was held in Friuli-Venezia Giulia, Italy from 21 to 28 January 2023. However, on 2 March 2022, in accordance with a recommendation by the International Olympic Committee (IOC), European Olympic Committees (EOC) suspended the participation of Russia from European Youth Olympic Festivals due to the 2022 Russian invasion of Ukraine.

=== European Championships ===
The 2023 European Championships were held in Espoo, Finland from 25 to 29 January 2023. However, on 1 March 2022, in accordance with a recommendation by the International Olympic Committee (IOC), the International Skating Union (ISU) banned figure skaters and officials from Russia from attending all international competitions due to the 2022 Russian invasion of Ukraine.

=== World Junior Championships ===
Commonly referred to as "Junior Worlds", the 2023 World Junior Championships were held in Calgary, Canada from 27 February to 5 March 2023. However, on 1 March 2022, in accordance with a recommendation by the International Olympic Committee (IOC), the International Skating Union (ISU) banned figure skaters and officials from Russia from attending all international competitions due to the 2022 Russian invasion of Ukraine.

=== World Championships ===
The 2023 World Championships were held in Saitama, Japan from 20 to 26 March 2023. However, on 1 March 2022, in accordance with a recommendation by the International Olympic Committee (IOC), the International Skating Union (ISU) banned figure skaters and officials from Russia from attending all international competitions due to the 2022 Russian invasion of Ukraine.

=== World Team Trophy ===
The 2023 World Team Trophy was held in Tokyo, Japan from 13 to 16 April 2023. However, on 1 March 2022, in accordance with a recommendation by the International Olympic Committee (IOC), the International Skating Union (ISU) banned figure skaters and officials from Russia from attending all international competitions due to the 2022 Russian invasion of Ukraine.
