= Channel One Trophy =

Russian figure skating domestic competition

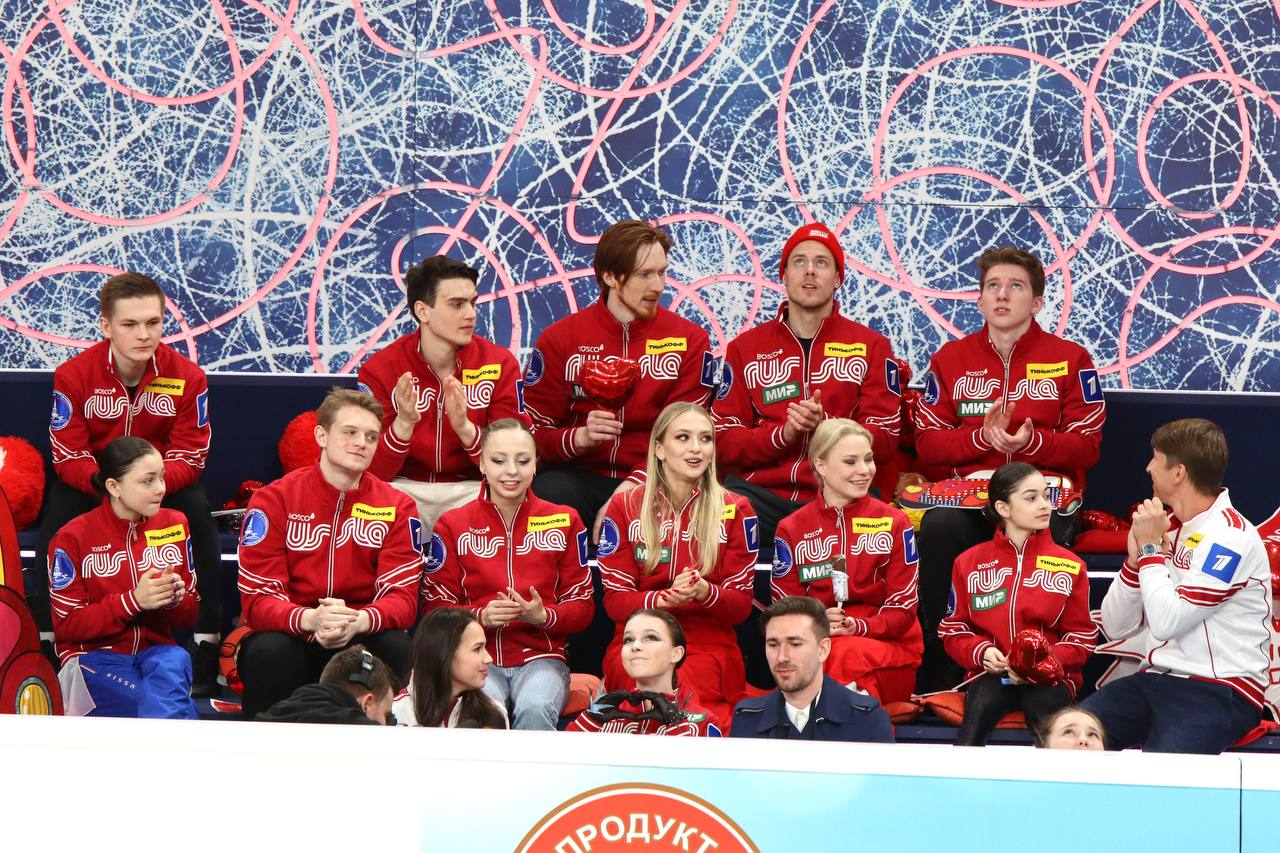
2022 Channel One Cup - Red Team

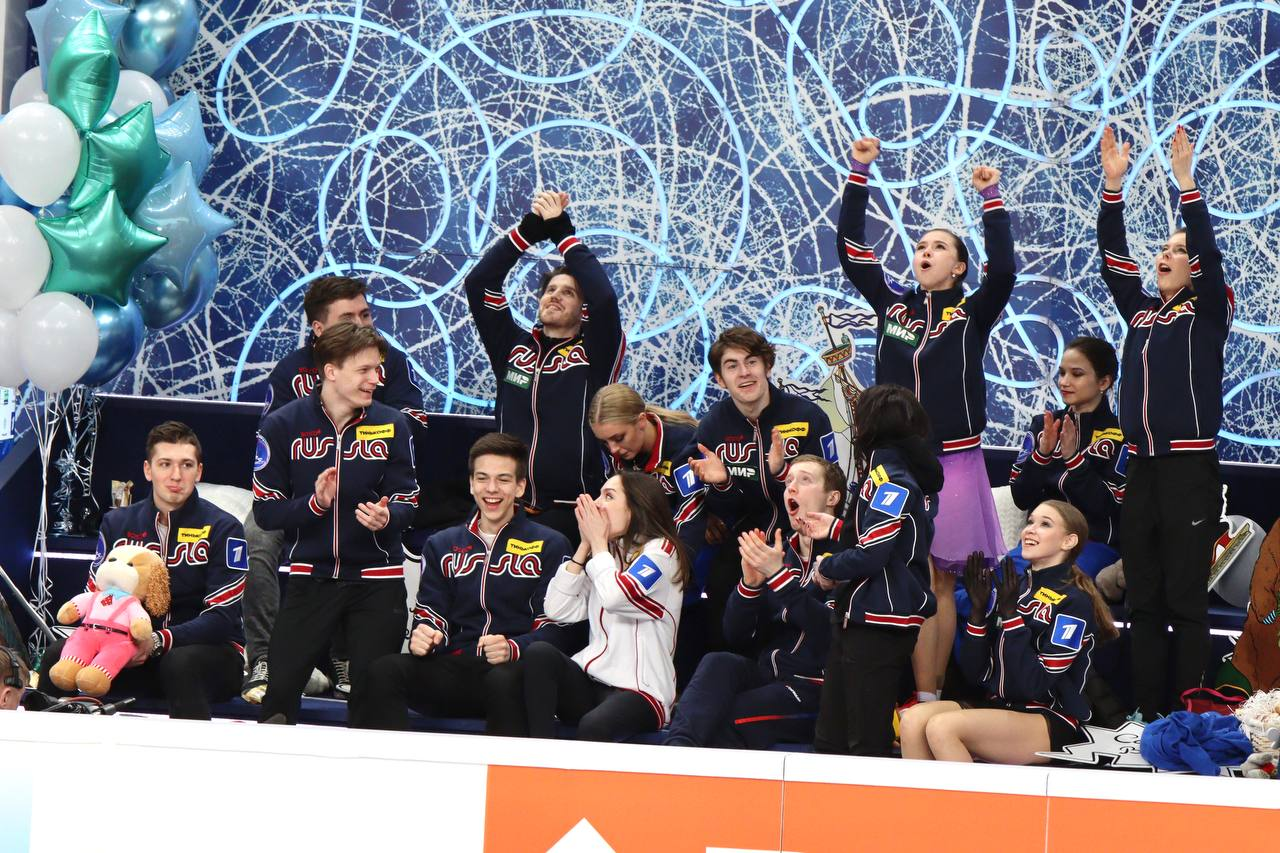
2022 Channel One Cup - Blue team

The Channel One Trophy, or the Channel One Cup (Russian: Кубок Первого канала по фигурному катанию), is a Russian domestic team figure skating competition organized by the Russian Figure Skating Federation and the Channel One television channel.

Skaters compete against each other in two teams.

The inaugural edition was held from 5 to 7 February 2021 in Moscow. The second edition was held from 24 to 27 March 2022 in Saransk.

== Editions ==
Year	Host city	Edition
2021	Moscow	2021 Channel One Trophy
2022	Saransk	2022 Channel One Trophy
2023	Moscow	2023 Channel One Trophy
2024	Saint Petersburg	2024 Channel One Trophy
2025	Chelyabinsk	2025 Channel One Trophy
2026	Saint Petersburg	2026 Channel One Trophy
