= Sergei Dudakov =

Russian figure skating coach and former competitor

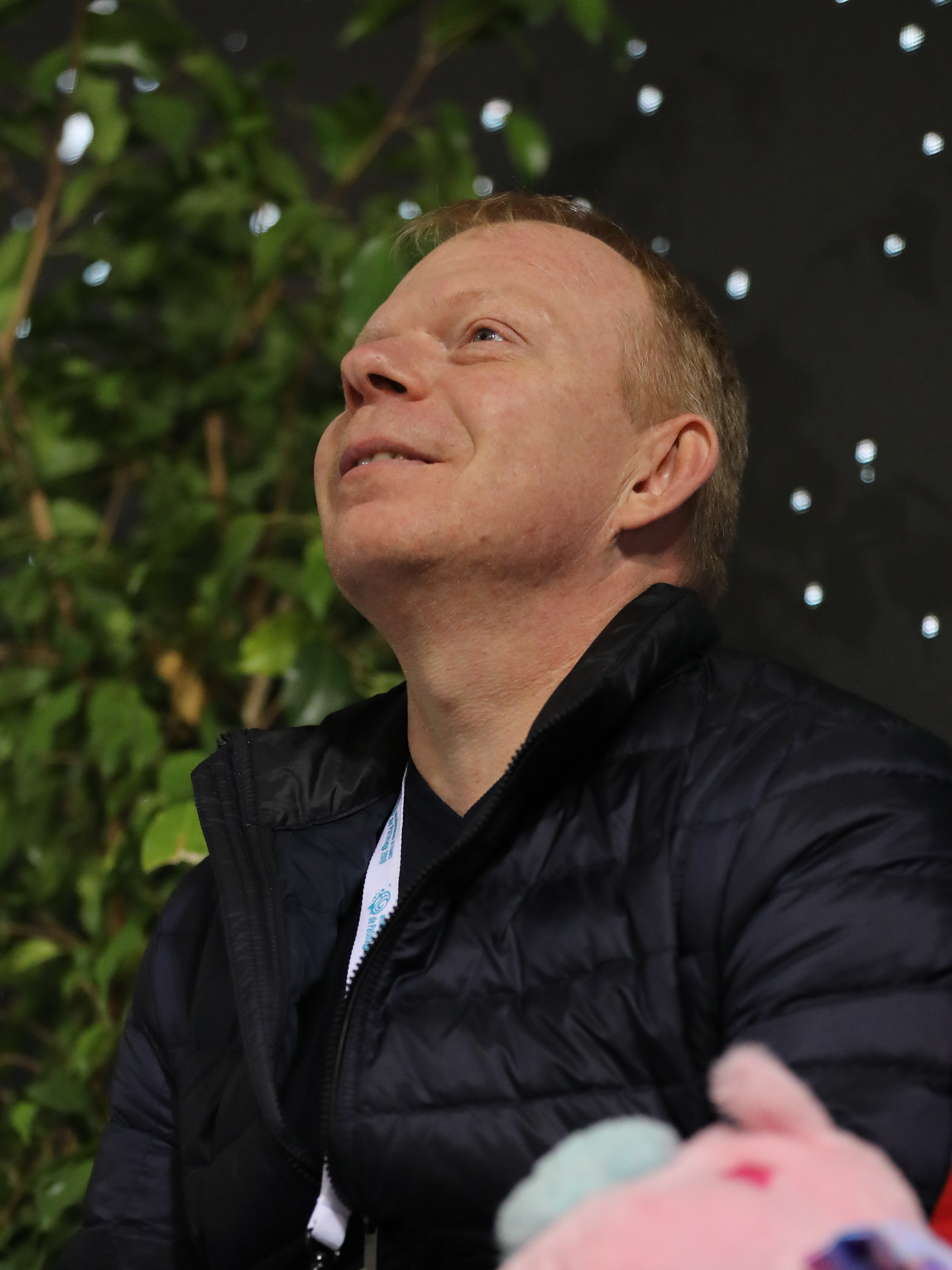
- Dudakov in 2019

Personal information
- Native name: Сергей Викторович Дудаков
- Full name: Sergei Viktorovich Dudakov
- Born: 13 January 1970 (age 56)

Figure skating career
- Skating club: Sambo 70

Sergei Viktorovich Dudakov (Russian: Сергей Викторович Дудаков; born 13 January 1970) is a Russian figure skating coach and former competitor who represented the Soviet Union. He is the 1989 Golden Spin of Zagreb champion and a two-time (1989–90) Piruetten champion. He finished 7th at the 1987 World Junior Championships. He was coached by Viktor Kudriavtsev in Moscow.

Dudakov coached at DYUSSH No. 48 (Moscow) in 2006–11 before joining Eteri Tutberidze's group at Sambo 70 (Moscow) in the 2011–12 season. His past and present students include: Yulia Lipnitskaya (until 2015), Serafima Sakhanovich (2014–15), Evgenia Medvedeva (until 2018), Alina Zagitova, Alena Kostornaia, Anna Shcherbakova, Alexandra Trusova, Kamila Valieva, Sergei Voronov (2013–16), Adian Pitkeev (until 2016), Moris Kvitelashvili, and Polina Tsurskaya (2013–2018).

== Competitive highlights ==
International
Event	1986–87	1989–90	1990–91
Golden Spin of Zagreb		1st	
Piruetten		1st	1st
World Junior Champ.	7th		
