= World Junior and Youth Olympic records set at the 2020 Winter Youth Olympics =

A number of world records (WR) and Olympic records (OR) were set in various skating events at these games.

== Figure skating ==
The following new ISU best scores were set during this competition:

Event	Date	Component	Skater(s)	Country	Score	Ref
Pair skating	10 January	Short program	Apollinariia Panfilova; Dmitry Rylov	Russia	71.74	
Pair skating	12 January	Free skating	Apollinariia Panfilova; Dmitry Rylov	Russia	127.47	
Pair skating	12 January	Total score	Apollinariia Panfilova; Dmitry Rylov	Russia	199.21	

== Short track speed skating ==
An Olympic record (OR) was set during the competition.

Event	Date	Round	Athlete	Country	Time	Record	Ref
Girls' 1000 metres	18 January	Semifinal 2	Seo Whi-min	South Korea	1:27.692	YOR	
