= Dmitrii Ialin =

Russian pair skater (born 1998)

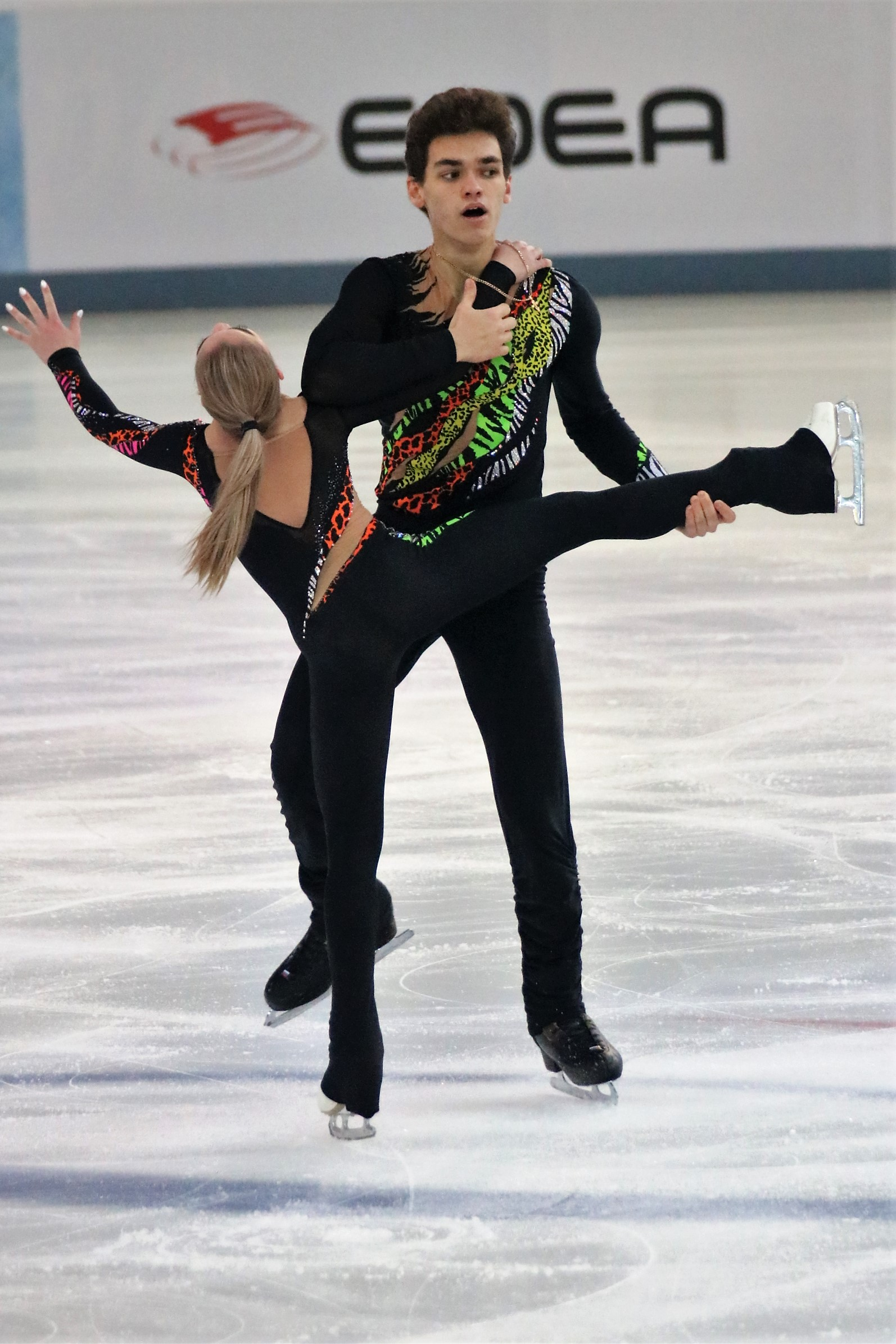

Personal information
- Native name: Дмитрий Михайлович Ялин
- Full name: Dmitrii Mihailovich Ialin
- Other names: Dmitry Yalin
- Born: 9 August 1998 (age 28) Yekaterinburg, Russia
- Home town: Saint Petersburg, Russia
- Height: 1.74 m (5 ft 8 1/2 in)

Figure skating career
- Country: Russia
- Coach: Ludmila Velikova, Nikolai Velikov and Vasilii Velikov
- Skating club: Olympic School St. Petersburg
- Began skating: 2002
Medal record
Representing Russia
Figure skating: Pairs
World Junior Championships
Silver medal – second place	2018 Sofia	Pairs
Bronze medal – third place	2019 Zagreb	Pairs
Junior Grand Prix Final
Silver medal – second place	2018–19 Vancouver	Pairs

Dmitrii Mihailovich Ialin (Russian: Дмитрий Михайлович Ялин, born 9 August 1998) is a Russian pair skater. With his former skating partner, Polina Kostiukovich, he is the 2018 World Junior and the 2018–19 Junior Grand Prix Final silver medalist, and the 2019 World Junior bronze medalist. He is also the 2017 JGP Croatia and the 2018 JGP Austria champion.

== Career ==
=== Early years ===
Ialin began learning to skate in 2002. He trained as a single skater until 2013 in Yekaterinburg. He later switched to pair skating and moved to Saint Petersburg.

Ialin and Polina Kostiukovich began competing together in 2016. They were coached by Vasili Velikov in Saint Petersburg.

=== 2017–2018 season: Silver at Junior Worlds ===
Kostiukovich/Ialin made their international debut in late September 2017 at the Junior Grand Prix (JGP) competition in Zagreb, Croatia, where they won the gold medal. They beat the silver medalist, Gao Yumeng / Xie Zhong, by less than one point and the bronze medalist, their teammates Aleksandra Boikova / Dmitrii Kozlovskii, by about two points. At this competition Kostiukovich/Ialin performed a level 3 quad twist which is rarely seen even at senior competitions. They received 10.46 points for that twist.

In January 2018 Kostiukovich/Ialin won the bronze medal at the 2018 Russian Junior Championships after placing eleventh in the short program and second in the free skate.

In March 2018 Kostiukovich/Ialin competed at the 2018 Junior Worlds where they won the silver medal after placing second in the short program and third in the free skate. They were part of a Russian sweep of the pairs' podium, along with their training partners Anastasia Mishina / Aleksandr Galliamov (bronze) and Daria Pavliuchenko / Denis Khodykin (gold).

=== 2018–2019 season: Bronze at Junior Worlds ===
Kostiukovich/Ialin started their season by competing in the 2018 Junior Grand Prix series. At their first Junior Grand Prix event of the season they won the gold medal in Linz, Austria. They were ranked first in both the short program and the free skate and won the gold medal by a margin of more than 14 points over the silver medalist, their teammates Anastasia Poluianova / Dmitry Sopot. At their second JGP event of the season they won the silver medal in Ostrava, Czech Republic. They were ranked first in the short program and second in the free skate, and were beaten by the gold medalists, their teammates and training partners Kseniia Akhanteva / Valerii Kolesov by a margin of about 4 points. At this event they set the junior-level pairs' record for the short program (66.30 points). With these results they qualified for the 2018–19 Junior Grand Prix Final.

At the JGP Final, Kostiukovich/Ialin won the silver medal after placing first in the short program and second in the free skate. They were part of a Russian sweep of the pairs' podium. Kostiukovich/Ialin beat the bronze medalists, Apollinariia Panfilova / Dmitry Rylov, by about 3 points but the race for the gold medal were really tight. The gold medalists, their training partners Mishina/Galliamov, beat Kostiukovich/Ialin by a margin of only 1.1 point. At this event Kostiukovich/Ialin scored their personal best score of 189.53 points and they also upgraded their junior-level pairs' record for the short program (66.84 points).

At the 2019 Russian Championships, Kostiukovich/Ialin placed eighth in the senior event and second in the junior event, and were assigned to the 2019 World Junior Championships alongside Mishina/Galliamov and Panfilova/Rylov. They won the short program at Junior Worlds, narrowly ahead of both of the other Russian teams, and were awarded a gold small medal for the result. In the free skate, they had underrotations called on their combination jump and Kostiukovich fell on a throw triple Salchow. As a result, they finished third in the free skate and third overall. Ialin admitted "unfortunately, not everything worked out today." Kostiukovich expressed the hope that "at our next Junior World Championships we can improve, fix our mistakes, and gain experience to be able to win."

=== 2019-2020 season ===
Kostiukovich/Ialin were assigned to the ISU JGP Croatia Cup 2019, in Zagreb, Croatia and they missed the events.

Competing at the 2020 Russian Championships at the senior level, they placed eighth. Kostiukovich/Ialin have qualified junior championships as well.

== Programs ==
=== With Kostiukovich ===
Season	Short program	Free skating	Exhibition
2019–2020	Smoke on the Water by Deep Purple performed by 2WEI choreo. by Denis Lunin	Sarabande Suite (Aeternae) by Globus choreo. by Denis Lunin	
2018–2019	Survivor (from Tomb Raider) by Destiny's Child performed by 2WEI	Selection (from Cirque du Soleil); Xotica: Journey to the Heart by René Dupéré	
2017–2018	Malaguena by Ernesto Lecuona	Xotica (from Cirque du Soleil)	Ego by Willy William

== Records and achievements ==
(with Ialin)

- Set the junior-level pairs' record of the new +5 / -5 GOE (Grade of Execution) system for the short program (66.30 points) at the 2018 JGP Czech Republic.
- Upgraded their junior-level pairs' record for the short program (66.84 points) at the 2018–19 JGP Final.
- Upgraded their junior-level pairs' record for the short program (68.31 points) at the 2019 World Junior Championships.

== Competitive highlights ==
JGP: Junior Grand Prix

=== With Kostiukovich ===
International
Event	17–18	18–19	19–20
Junior Worlds	2nd	3rd	
JGP Final		2nd	
JGP Austria		1st	
JGP Croatia	1st		WD
JGP Czech Republic		2nd	
JGP Poland	6th		WD
National
Russian Champ.		8th	8th
Russian Jr. Champ.	3rd	2nd	5th
TBD = Assigned; WD = Withdrew

== Detailed results ==
Small medals for short and free programs awarded only at ISU Championships.

With Kostiukovich

2019–20 season
Date	Event	Level	SP	FS	Total
4–8 February 2020	2020 Russian Junior Championships	Junior	6; 66.11	4; 121.55	5; 187.66
24–29 December 2019	2020 Russian Championships	Senior	10; 64.69	6; 129.04	8; 193.73
2018–19 season
Date	Event	Level	SP	FS	Total
4–10 March 2019	2019 World Junior Championships	Junior	1; 68.31	3; 113.28	3; 181.59
1–4 February 2019	2019 Russian Junior Championships	Junior	3; 68.52	1; 127.40	2; 195.92
19–23 December 2018	2019 Russian Championships	Senior	9; 64.43	7; 124.90	8; 189.33
6–9 December 2018	2018–19 JGP Final	Junior	1; 66.84	2; 122.69	2; 189.53
26–29 September 2018	2018 JGP Czech Republic	Junior	1; 66.30	2; 114.58	2; 180.88
29 August – 1 September 2018	2018 JGP Austria	Junior	1; 60.83	1; 119.76	1; 180.59
2017–18 season
Date	Event	Level	SP	FS	Total
5–11 March 2018	2018 World Junior Championships	Junior	2; 61.77	3; 106.22	2; 167.99
23–26 January 2018	2018 Russian Junior Championships	Junior	11; 54.66	2; 121.71	3; 176.37
4–7 October 2017	2017 JGP Poland	Junior	4; 54.43	6; 92.02	6; 146.45
27–30 September 2017	2017 JGP Croatia	Junior	3; 59.68	1; 105.80	1; 165.48

World Junior Record Holders
Preceded by (Russia) Anastasia Mishina / Aleksandr Galiamov	Pairs' Junior Short Program; 27 September 2018 – 19 September 2019	Succeeded by (Russia) Apollinariia Panfilova / Dmitry Rylov
