= List of highest junior scores in figure skating =

Figure skating records and statistics

Medal records
- Olympic Games; World Championships; European Championships; Four Continents Championships; Grand Prix of Figure Skating
- Other events: Grand Slam; Junior Grand Slam; Golden Slam; Junior Golden Slam; Super Slam

Highest scores statistics
- Current senior; Current junior; Historical senior; Historical junior

Rankings (current and statistics)
- World Standings; Season's World Ranking

The ISU Judging System (IJS) is the scoring system that has been used since 2003 to judge the figure skating disciplines of men's and women's singles, pair skating, and ice dance. It was designed and implemented by the International Skating Union (ISU), the ruling body of the sport, and is used in all international competitions sanctioned by the ISU. The ISU Judging System replaced the previous 6.0 system, and was created, in part, in response to the 2002 Winter Olympics figure skating scandal, in an attempt to make the scoring system more objective and less vulnerable to abuse.

Up to and including the 2017–2018 season, the Grade of Execution (GOE) scoring system for each program element ranged between +3 and -3. Starting with the 2018–2019 season, which began on July 1, 2018, the GOE was expanded to range between +5 and -5. Hence, the International Skating Union (ISU) have restarted all records from the 2018–2019 season and all previous statistics have been marked as "historical". Accordingly, following list of highest junior scores in figure skating contains the highest junior scores earned from the 2018–2019 season onwards, using the +5/-5 GOE scoring range.

These lists include: Records (current record holders; technical and component record scores; progression of record scores), Personal bests (highest personal best (PB) scores, highest PB technical element scores; highest PB program component scores, and Absolute bests (lists of absolute best scores). For the personal best lists, only one score is listed for any one skater. The absolute best lists may include more than one score for the same skater.

The ISU only recognizes the best scores that are set at international competitions run under the ISU's rules, and does not recognize, for example, scores that are obtained at national figure skating championships. The junior competitions recognized by the ISU are: Youth Olympics (including the team event), the World Junior Championships, and Junior GP events.

== Incumbent highest scores ==
Highest scores in men's singles by segment
Component	Skater	Nation	Score	Event	Ref.
Combined total	Ilia Malinin	United States	276.11	2022 World Junior Championships	Details
Short program	Rio Nakata	Japan	89.51	2026 World Junior Championships	Details
Free skating	Ilia Malinin	United States	187.12	2022 World Junior Championships	Details

Highest scores in women's singles by segment
Component	Skater	Nation	Score	Event	Ref.
Combined total	Sofia Akateva	Russia	233.08	2021 JGP Russia	Details
Short program	Alena Kostornaia	Russia	76.32	2018–19 Junior Grand Prix Final	Details
Free skating	Sofia Akateva	Russia	157.19	2021 JGP Russia	Details

Highest scores in pairs by segment
Component	Female partner	Male partner	Nation	Score	Event	Ref.
Combined total	Anastasiia Metelkina	Luka Berulava	Georgia	202.11	2023–24 Junior Grand Prix Final	Details
Short program	Apollinariia Panfilova	Dmitry Rylov	Russia	73.71	2020 World Junior Championships	Details
Free skating	Anastasiia Metelkina	Luka Berulava	Georgia	131.63	2023–24 Junior Grand Prix Final	Details

Highest scores in ice dance by segment
Component	Female partner	Male partner	Nation	Score	Event	Ref.
Combined total	Noemi Maria Tali	Noah Lafornara	Italy	177.50	2025 World Junior Championships	Details
Rhythm dance	Leah Neset	Artem Markelov	United States	72.48	2023–24 Junior Grand Prix Final	Details
Free dance	Avonley Nguyen	Vadym Kolesnik	United States	108.91	2020 World Junior Championships	Details

== Men's singles ==
=== Men's highest personal best scores ===
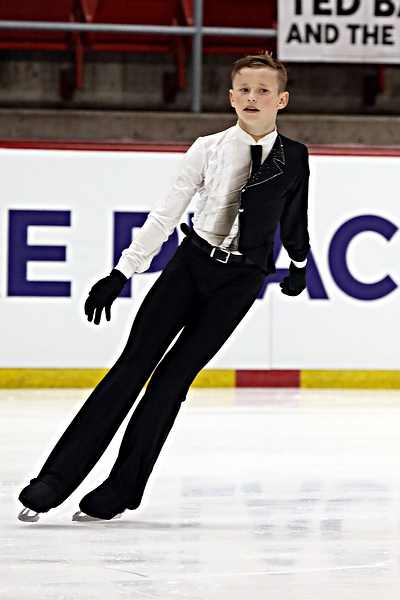
Ilia Malinin holds the records for the junior men's total score and free skate score.

Top 10 highest personal best scores in the men's combined total
Pl.	Skater	Nation	Score	Event
1	Ilia Malinin	United States	276.11	2022 World Junior Championships
2	Rio Nakata	Japan	268.47	2026 World Junior Championships
3	Kao Miura	Japan	264.74	2023 World Junior Championships
4	Lev Lazarev	Individual Neutral Athletes	260.90	2026 JGP Bangkok
5	Shun Sato	Japan	255.11	2019–20 JGP Final
6	Daniil Samsonov	Russia	250.51	2019 JGP Poland
7	Habin Choi	South Korea	246.41	2026 JGP Latvia
8	Yuma Kagiyama	Japan	245.35	2019 JGP Poland
9	Andrei Mozalev	Russia	245.09	2020 World Junior Championships
10	Yanhao Li	New Zealand	244.68	2019 JGP Bangkok

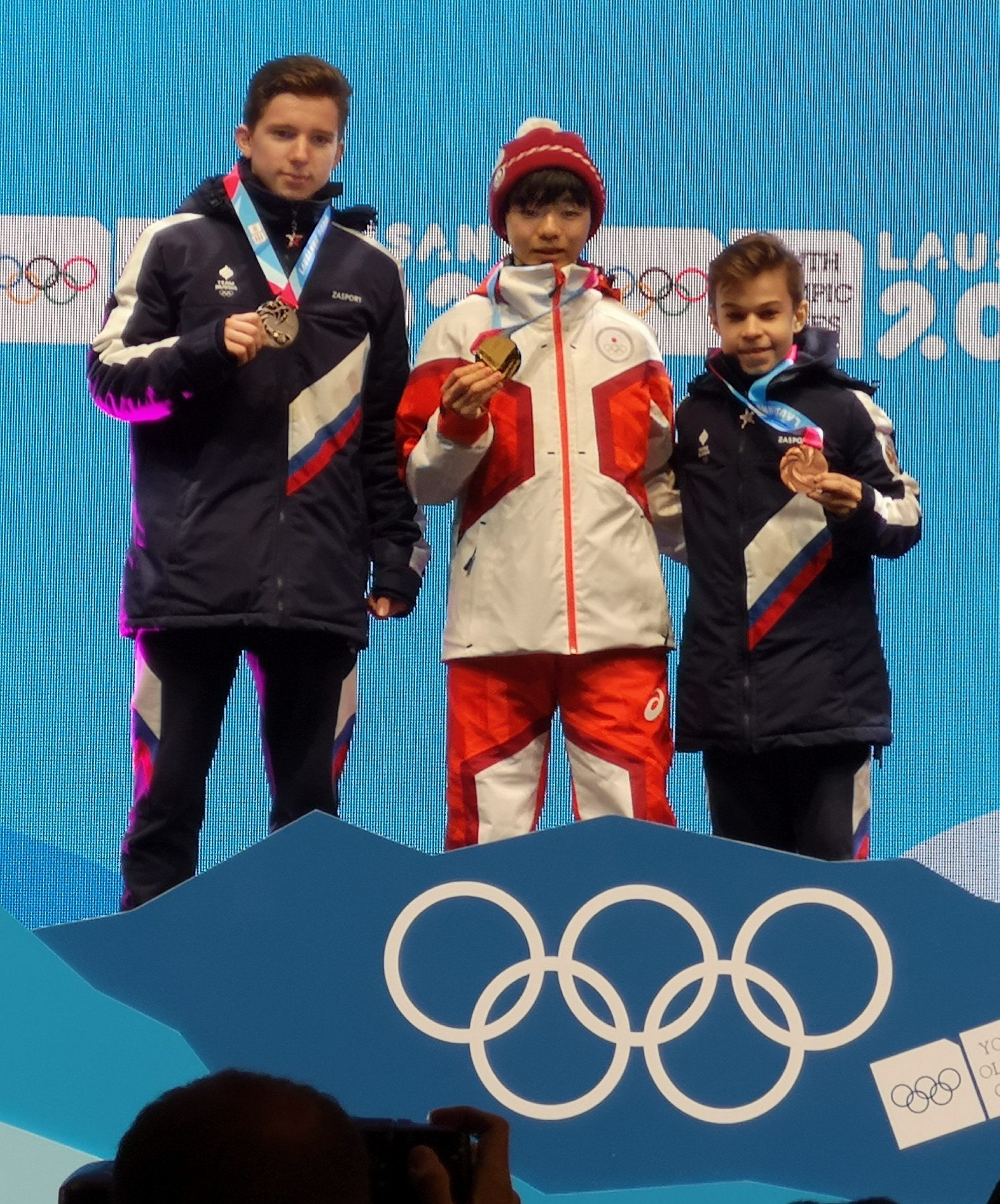
Daniil Samsonov (right), Yuma Kagiyama (center), and Andrei Mozalev (left) hold the sixth-highest, the eighth-highest and the ninth-highest short program scores.

Top 10 highest personal best scores in the men's short program
Pl.	Skater	Nation	Score	Event
1	Rio Nakata	Japan	89.51	2026 World Junior Championships
2	Ilia Malinin	United States	88.99	2022 World Junior Championships
3	Daniil Samsonov	Russia	87.33	2019 JGP Poland
4	Lev Lazarev	Individual Neutral Athletes	86.76	2026 JGP China
5	Seo Min-kyu	South Korea	86.68	2025 World Junior Championships
6	Yuma Kagiyama	Japan	85.82	2020 World Junior Championships
7	Kao Miura	Japan	85.11	2023 World Junior Championships
8	Jacob Sanchez	United States	85.09	2024 JGP Slovenia
9	Andrei Mozalev	Russia	84.31	2020 World Junior Championships
10	Yanhao Li	New Zealand	83.59	2026 JGP China

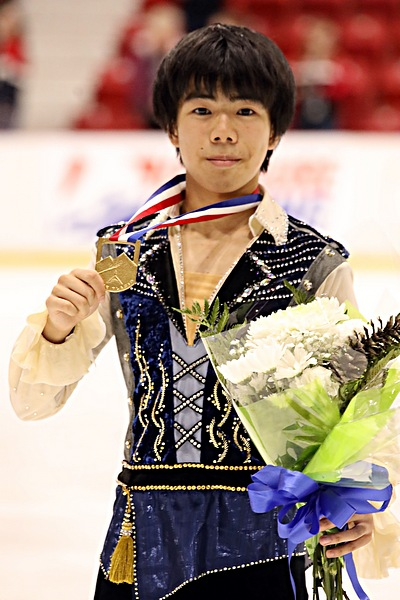
Shun Sato currently holds the third-highest junior men's total score and free skating score.

Top 10 highest personal best scores in the men's free skating
Pl.	Skater	Nation	Score	Event
1	Ilia Malinin	United States	187.12	2022 World Junior Championships
2	Kao Miura	Japan	179.63	2023 World Junior Championships
3	Rio Nakata	Japan	178.96	2026 World Junior Championships
4	Shun Sato	Japan	177.86	2019–20 JGP Final
5	Seo Min-kyu	South Korea	171.09	2025-26 JGP Final
6	Habin Choi	South Korea	170.20	2026 JGP Latvia
7	Yuma Kagiyama	Japan	166.41	2020 Winter Youth Olympics
8	Lev Lazarev	Individual Neutral Athletes	163.45	2026 JGP China
9	Andrei Mozalev	Russia	163.18	2019 JGP Poland
9	Andrei Mozalev	Russia	160.78	2020 World Junior Championships

=== Men's absolute best scores ===
Top 10 absolute best scores in the men's combined total
Pl.	Skater	Nation	Score	Event
1	Ilia Malinin	United States	276.11	2022 World Junior Championships
2	Rio Nakata	Japan	268.47	2026 World Junior Championships
3	Kao Miura	Japan	264.74	2023 World Junior Championships
4	Seo Min-kyu	South Korea	255.91	2025-26 JGP Final
5	Shun Sato	Japan	255.11	2019–20 JGP Final
6	Daniil Samsonov	Russia	250.51	2019 JGP Poland
7	Lev Lazarev	Individual Neutral Athletes	250.21	2026 JGP China
8	Rio Nakata	Japan	249.70	2025-26 JGP Final
9	Rio Nakata	Japan	248.99	2025 World Junior Championships
10	Rio Nakata	Japan	246.94	2025 JGP Latvia

Top 10 absolute best scores in the men's short program
Pl.	Skater	Nation	Score	Event
1	Rio Nakata	Japan	89.51	2026 World Junior Championships
2	Ilia Malinin	United States	88.99	2022 World Junior Championships
3	Rio Nakata	Japan	88.72	2025 JGP Latvia
4	Daniil Samsonov	Russia	87.33	2019 JGP Poland
5	Seo Min-kyu	South Korea	86.68	2025 World Junior Championships
6	Rio Nakata	Japan	86.48	2025-26 JGP Final
7	Seo Min-kyu	South Korea	86.33	2026 World Junior Championships
8	Rio Nakata	Japan	86.04	2025 World Junior Championships
9	Yuma Kagiyama	Japan	85.82	2020 World Junior Championships
10	Kao Miura	Japan	85.11	2023 World Junior Championships

Top 10 absolute best scores in the men's free skating
Pl.	Skater	Nation	Score	Event
1	Ilia Malinin	United States	187.12	2022 World Junior Championships
2	Kao Miura	Japan	179.63	2023 World Junior Championships
3	Rio Nakata	Japan	178.96	2026 World Junior Championships
4	Shun Sato	Japan	177.86	2019–20 JGP Final
5	Seo Min-kyu	South Korea	171.09	2025-26 JGP Final
6	Habin Choi	South Korea	170.20	2026 JGP Latvia
7	Yuma Kagiyama	Japan	166.41	2020 Winter Youth Olympics
8	Ilia Malinin	United States	164.04	2021 JGP Austria
9	Rio Nakata	Japan	163.22	2025-26 JGP Final
10	Daniil Samsonov	Russia	163.18	2019 JGP Poland

=== Progression of men's highest scores ===
Progression of highest scores in the men's combined total
Date	Skater	Nation	Score	Event
August 24, 2018	Aleksa Rakic	Canada	180.13	2018 JGP Slovakia
August 24, 2018	Egor Rukhin	Russia	187.94	2018 JGP Slovakia
August 24, 2018	Andrew Torgashev	United States	194.75	2018 JGP Slovakia
August 24, 2018	Stephen Gogolev	Canada	226.63	2018 JGP Slovakia
December 7, 2018	Stephen Gogolev	Canada	233.58	2018–19 JGP Final
August 24, 2019	Yuma Kagiyama	Japan	234.87	2019 JGP France
September 21, 2019	Yuma Kagiyama	Japan	245.35	2019 JGP Poland
September 21, 2019	Daniil Samsonov	Russia	250.51	2019 JGP Poland
December 7, 2019	Shun Sato	Japan	255.11	2019–20 JGP Final
April 16, 2022	Ilia Malinin	United States	276.11	2022 World Junior Championships

Progression of highest scores in the men's short program
Date	Skater	Nation	Score	Event
August 23, 2018	Egor Rukhin	Russia	60.60	2018 JGP Slovakia
August 23, 2018	Roman Savosin	Russia	67.10	2018 JGP Slovakia
August 23, 2018	Mitsuki Sumoto	Japan	74.13	2018 JGP Slovakia
August 23, 2018	Stephen Gogolev	Canada	77.67	2018 JGP Slovakia
August 30, 2018	Conrad Orzel	Canada	79.66	2018 JGP Austria
September 28, 2018	Camden Pulkinen	United States	81.01	2018 JGP Czech Republic
March 6, 2019	Tomoki Hiwatashi	United States	81.50	2019 World Junior Championships
March 6, 2019	Camden Pulkinen	United States	82.41	2019 World Junior Championships
September 12, 2019	Artur Danielian	Russia	83.31	2019 JGP Russia
September 19, 2019	Daniil Samsonov	Russia	87.33	2019 JGP Poland
April 14, 2022	Ilia Malinin	United States	88.99	2022 World Junior Championships
March 4, 2026	Rio Nakata	Japan	89.51	2026 World Junior Championships

Progression of highest scores in the men's free skating
Date	Skater	Nation	Score	Event
August 24, 2018	Egor Rukhin	Russia	127.34	2018 JGP Slovakia
August 24, 2018	Andrew Torgashev	United States	129.38	2018 JGP Slovakia
August 24, 2018	Stephen Gogolev	Canada	148.96	2018 JGP Slovakia
September 15, 2018	Petr Gumennik	Russia	150.35	2018 JGP Canada
December 7, 2018	Stephen Gogolev	Canada	154.76	2018–19 JGP Final
September 21, 2019	Yuma Kagiyama	Japan	160.63	2019 JGP Poland
September 21, 2019	Daniil Samsonov	Russia	163.18	2019 JGP Poland
December 7, 2019	Shun Sato	Japan	177.86	2019–20 JGP Final
April 16, 2022	Ilia Malinin	United States	187.12	2022 World Junior Championships

== Women's singles ==
=== Women's highest personal best scores ===
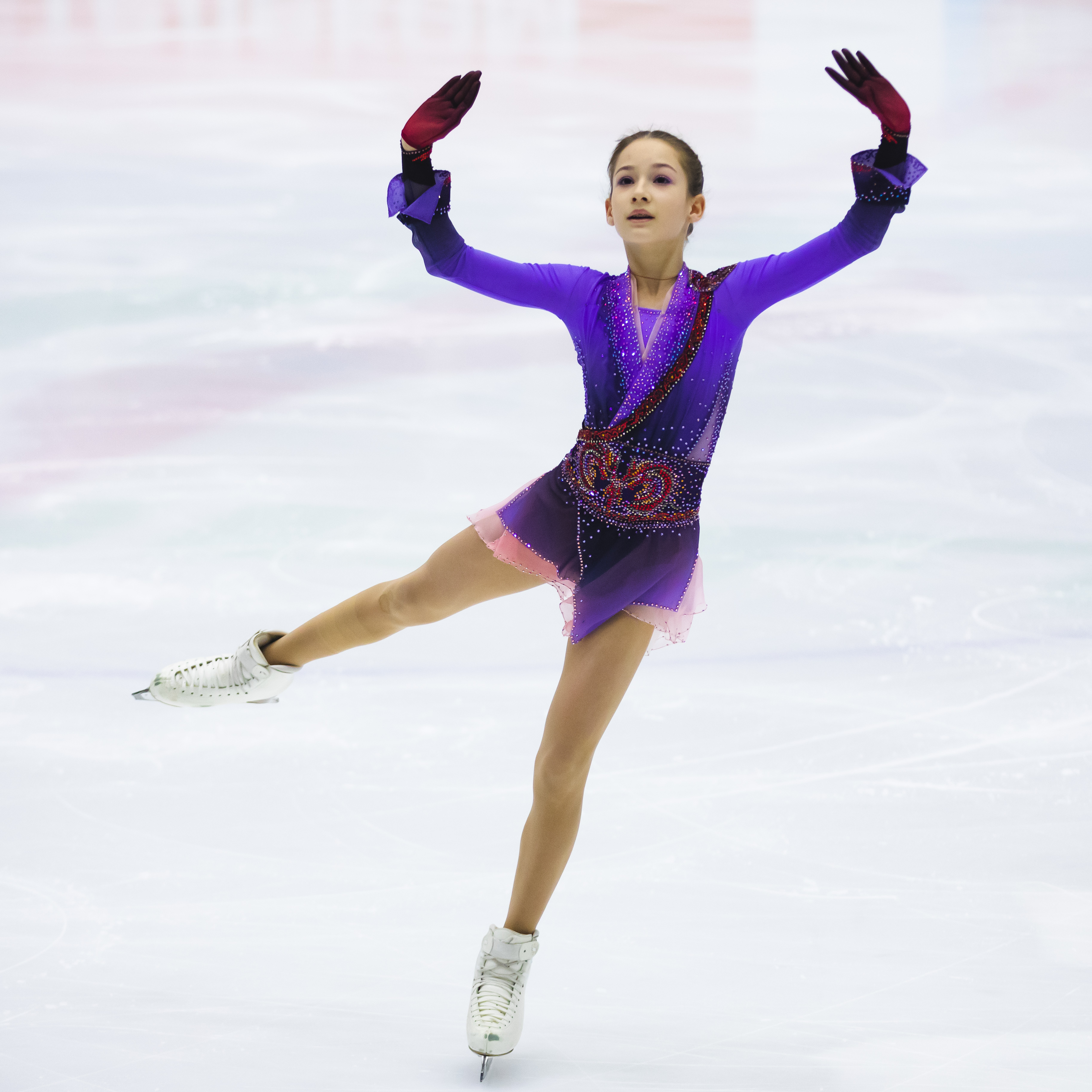
Sofia Akateva currently holds the highest junior women's combined total and free skating scores.

Top 10 highest personal best scores in the women's combined total
Pl.	Skater	Nation	Score	Event
1	Sofia Akateva	Russia	233.08	2021 JGP Russia
2	Mao Shimada	Japan	230.84	2025 World Junior Championships
3	Kamila Valieva	Russia	227.30	2020 World Junior Championships
4	Alexandra Trusova	Russia	222.89	2019 World Junior Championships
5	Anna Shcherbakova	Russia	219.94	2019 World Junior Championships
6	Alena Kostornaia	Russia	217.98	2018–19 JGP Final
7	Veronika Zhilina	Russia	216.92	2021 JGP Slovakia
8	Kseniia Sinitsyna	Russia	215.58	2019 JGP Italy
9	You Young	South Korea	214.00	2020 Winter Youth Olympics
10	Sofiia Dzepka	Individual Neutral Athletes	213.28	2026 JGP China

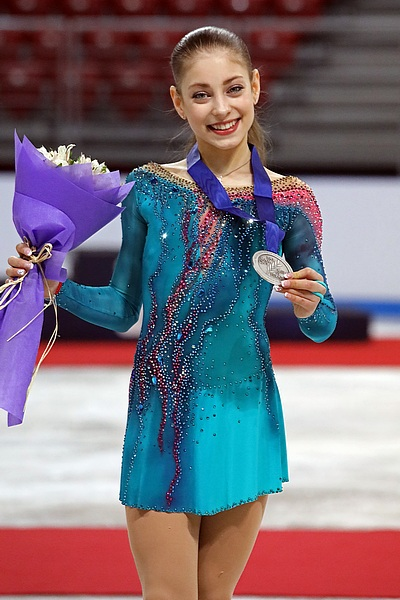
Alena Kostornaia is the record holder for the junior women's short program score.

Top 10 highest personal best scores in the women's short program
Pl.	Skater	Nation	Score	Event
1	Alena Kostornaia	Russia	76.32	2018–19 JGP Final
2	Sofia Akateva	Russia	75.89	2021 JGP Russia
3	Kamila Valieva	Russia	74.92	2020 World Junior Championships
4	Alexandra Trusova	Russia	74.74	2018 JGP Lithuania
5	Mao Shimada	Japan	74.68	2025 World Junior Championships
6	Kseniia Sinitsyna	Russia	74.65	2019 JGP Italy
7	Mei Okada	Japan	74.27	2026 JGP Turkey
8	You Young	South Korea	73.51	2020 Winter Youth Olympics
9	Shin Ji-a	South Korea	73.48	2024 World Junior Championships
10	Yihan Wang	China	73.38	2026 JGP Georgia

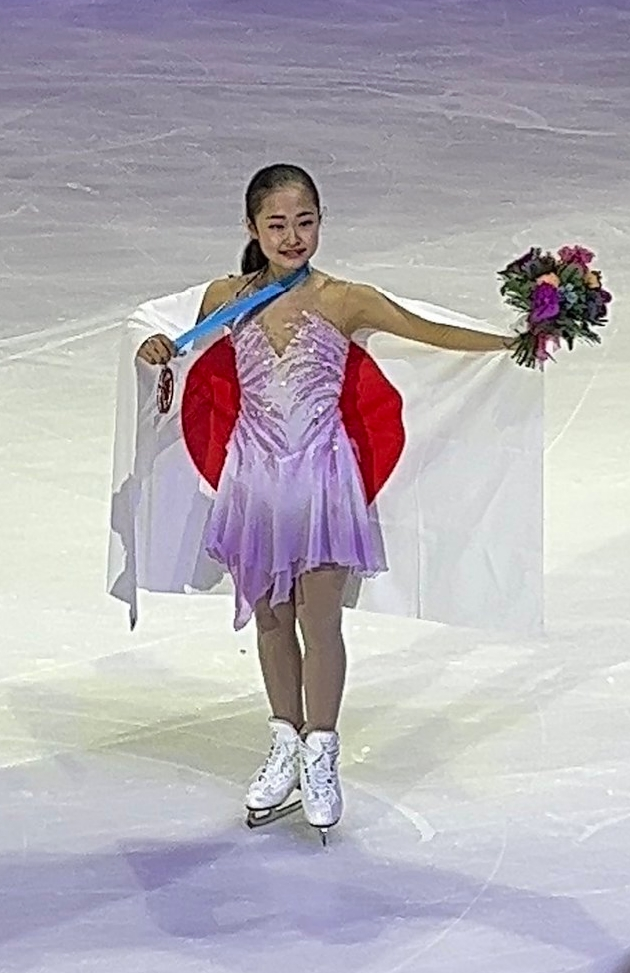
Mao Shimada currently holds the second-highest junior women's free skating score.

Top 10 highest personal best scores in the women's free skating
Pl.	Skater	Nation	Score	Event
1	Sofia Akateva	Russia	157.19	2021 JGP Russia
2	Mao Shimada	Japan	156.16	2025 World Junior Championships
3	Kamila Valieva	Russia	152.38	2020 World Junior Championships
4	Alexandra Trusova	Russia	150.40	2019 World Junior Championships
5	Anna Shcherbakova	Russia	147.08	2019 World Junior Championships
6	Veronika Zhilina	Russia	145.35	2021 JGP Slovakia
7	Alena Kostornaia	Russia	141.66	2018–19 JGP Final
8	Sofia Samodelkina	Russia	141.63	2021 JGP Russia
9	Hana Yoshida	Japan	141.42	2022 JGP Italy
10	Kseniia Sinitsyna	Russia	140.93	2019 JGP Italy

=== Women's absolute best scores ===
Top 10 absolute best scores in the women's combined total
Pl.	Skater	Nation	Score	Event
1	Sofia Akateva	Russia	233.08	2021 JGP Russia
2	Mao Shimada	Japan	230.84	2025 World Junior Championships
3	Kamila Valieva	Russia	227.30	2020 World Junior Championships
4	Sofia Akateva	Russia	225.64	2021 JGP Poland
5	Mao Shimada	Japan	224.68	2024 JGP Poland
6	Mao Shimada	Japan	224.54	2023 World Junior Championships
7	Alexandra Trusova	Russia	222.89	2019 World Junior Championships
8	Kamila Valieva	Russia	221.95	2019 JGP Russia
9	Alexandra Trusova	Russia	221.44	2018 JGP Lithuania
10	Alexandra Trusova	Russia	221.00	2018 JGP Armenia

Top 10 absolute best scores in the women's short program
Pl.	Skater	Nation	Score	Event
1	Alena Kostornaia	Russia	76.32	2018–19 JGP Final
2	Sofia Akateva	Russia	75.89	2021 JGP Russia
3	Kamila Valieva	Russia	74.92	2020 World Junior Championships
4	Alexandra Trusova	Russia	74.74	2018 JGP Lithuania
5	Mao Shimada	Japan	74.68	2025 World Junior Championships
6	Kseniia Sinitsyna	Russia	74.65	2019 JGP Italy
7	Alexandra Trusova	Russia	74.43	2018–19 JGP Final
8	Mei Okada	Japan	74.27	2026 JGP Turkey
9	Alexandra Trusova	Russia	74.19	2018 JGP Armenia
10	Mao Shimada	Japan	73.78	2023 JGP Japan

Top 10 absolute best scores in the women's free skating
Pl.	Skater	Nation	Score	Event
1	Sofia Akateva	Russia	157.19	2021 JGP Russia
2	Mao Shimada	Japan	156.16	2025 World Junior Championships
3	Sofia Akateva	Russia	153.73	2021 JGP Poland
4	Mao Shimada	Japan	152.76	2023 World Junior Championships
5	Kamila Valieva	Russia	152.38	2020 World Junior Championships
6	Mao Shimada	Japan	151.57	2024 JGP Poland
7	Alexandra Trusova	Russia	150.40	2019 World Junior Championships
8	Mao Shimada	Japan	148.87	2022 JGP Poland I
9	Kamila Valieva	Russia	148.39	2019 JGP Russia
10	Anna Shcherbakova	Russia	147.08	2019 World Junior Championships

=== Progression of women's highest scores ===
Progression of highest scores in the women's combined total
Date	Skater	Nation	Score	Event
August 25, 2018	Yuhana Yokoi	Japan	173.15	2018 JGP Slovakia
August 25, 2018	Anna Shcherbakova	Russia	205.39	2018 JGP Slovakia
September 7, 2018	Alexandra Trusova	Russia	221.44	2018 JGP Lithuania
March 9, 2019	Alexandra Trusova	Russia	222.89	2019 World Junior Championships
March 7, 2020	Kamila Valieva	Russia	227.30	2020 World Junior Championships
September 18, 2021	Sofia Akateva	Russia	233.08	2021 JGP Russia

Progression of highest scores in the women's short program
Date	Skater	Nation	Score	Event
August 23, 2018	Anna Tarusina	Russia	67.14	2018 JGP Slovakia
August 23, 2018	Anna Shcherbakova	Russia	73.18	2018 JGP Slovakia
September 6, 2018	Alexandra Trusova	Russia	74.74	2018 JGP Lithuania
December 6, 2018	Alena Kostornaia	Russia	76.32	2018–19 JGP Final

Progression of highest scores in the women's free skating
Date	Skater	Nation	Score	Event
August 25, 2018	Yuhana Yokoi	Japan	121.50	2018 JGP Slovakia
August 25, 2018	Anna Shcherbakova	Russia	132.21	2018 JGP Slovakia
September 1, 2018	Alena Kostornaia	Russia	132.42	2018 JGP Austria
September 7, 2018	Alexandra Trusova	Russia	146.70	2018 JGP Lithuania
October 12, 2018	Alexandra Trusova	Russia	146.81	2018 JGP Armenia
March 9, 2019	Alexandra Trusova	Russia	150.40	2019 World Junior Championships
March 7, 2020	Kamila Valieva	Russia	152.38	2020 World Junior Championships
September 18, 2021	Sofia Akateva	Russia	157.19	2021 JGP Russia

== Pairs ==
=== Pairs' highest personal best scores ===
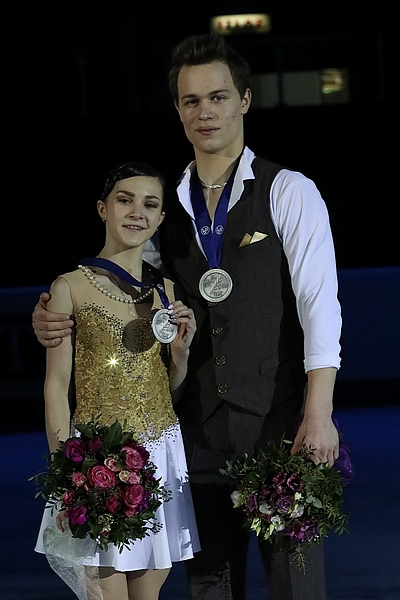
Apollinariia Panfilova and Dmitry Rylov are the record holders for the junior pairs' short program score and hold the second-highest combined total and free skating scores.

Top 10 highest personal best scores in the pairs' combined total
Pl.	Female partner	Male partner	Nation	Score	Event
1	Anastasiia Metelkina	Luka Berulava	Georgia	202.11	2023-24 JGP Final
2	Apollinariia Panfilova	Dmitry Rylov	Russia	199.21	2020 Winter Youth Olympics
3	Polina Shesheleva	Egor Karnaukhov	Individual Neutral Athletes	191.84	2026 JGP China
4	Anastasia Mishina	Aleksandr Galliamov	Russia	190.63	2018–19 JGP Final
5	Polina Kostiukovich	Dmitrii Ialin	Russia	189.53	2018–19 JGP Final
6	Ekaterina Chikmareva	Matvei Ianchenkov	Russia	189.11	2021 JGP Russia
7	Natalia Khabibullina	Ilya Knyazhuk	Russia	188.84	2021 JGP Austria
8	Karina Safina	Luka Berulava	Georgia	188.12	2022 World Junior Championships
9	Kseniia Akhanteva	Valerii Kolesov	Russia	185.05	2019 JGP Russia
10	Diana Mukhametzianova	Ilya Mironov	Russia	184.37	2019–20 JGP Final

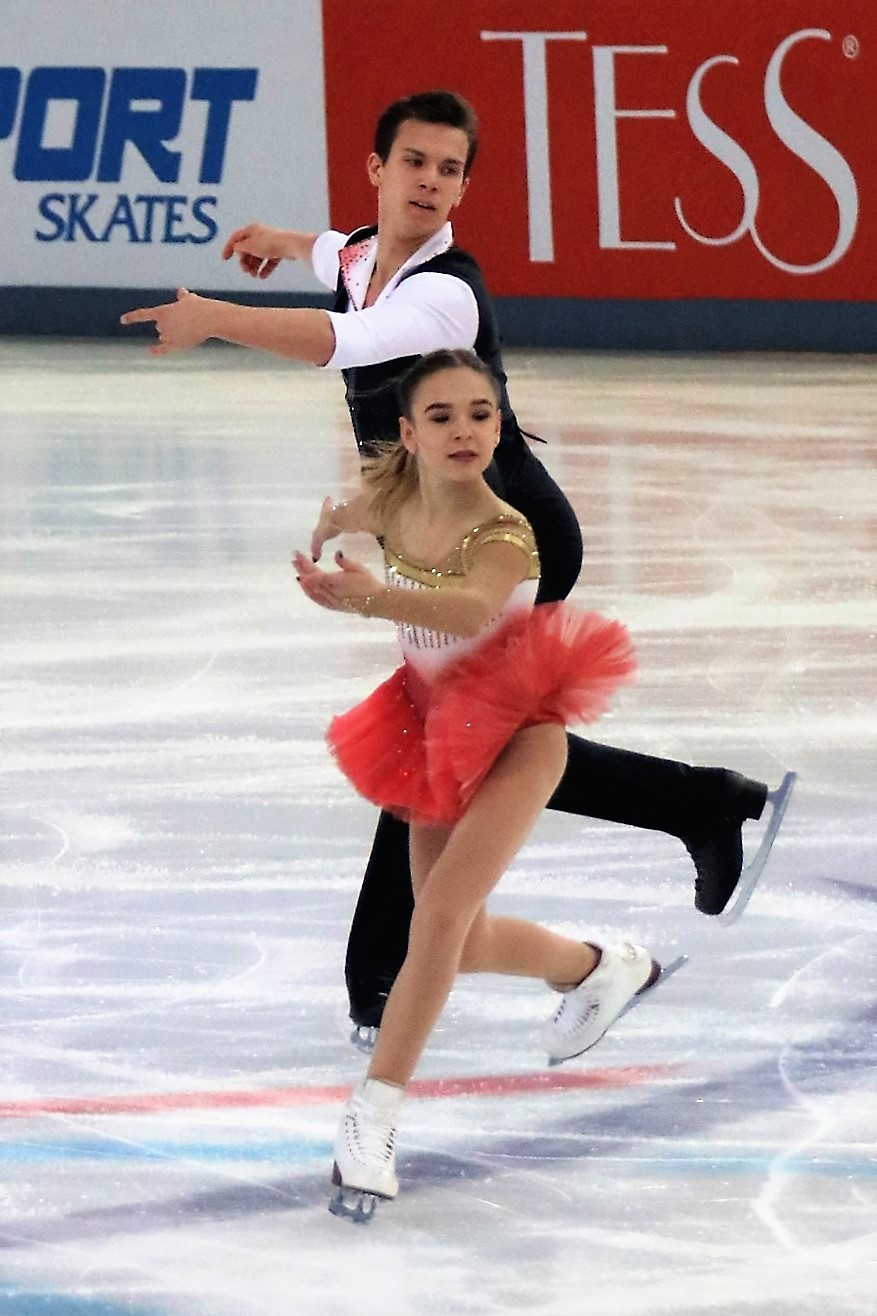
Kseniia Akhanteva and Valerii Kolesov currently hold the third-highest score for the junior pairs' short program.

Top 10 highest personal best scores in the pairs' short program
Pl.	Female partner	Male partner	Nation	Score	Event
1	Apollinariia Panfilova	Dmitry Rylov	Russia	73.71	2020 World Junior Championships
2	Anastasiia Metelkina	Luka Berulava	Georgia	71.53	2024 World Junior Championships
3	Kseniia Akhanteva	Valerii Kolesov	Russia	70.44	2020 World Junior Championships
4	Iuliia Artemeva	Mikhail Nazarychev	Russia	70.26	2020 World Junior Championships
5	Polina Kostiukovich	Dmitrii Ialin	Russia	68.31	2019 World Junior Championships
6	Karina Safina	Luka Berulava	Georgia	67.77	2022 World Junior Championships
7	Anastasia Mishina	Aleksandr Galliamov	Russia	67.02	2019 World Junior Championships
8	Sophia Baram	Daniel Tioumentsev	United States	66.95	2023 World Junior Championships
9	Polina Shesheleva	Egor Karnaukhov	Individual Neutral Athletes	65.54	2026 JGP China
10	Diana Mukhametzianova	Ilya Mironov	Russia	64.90	2019–20 JGP Final

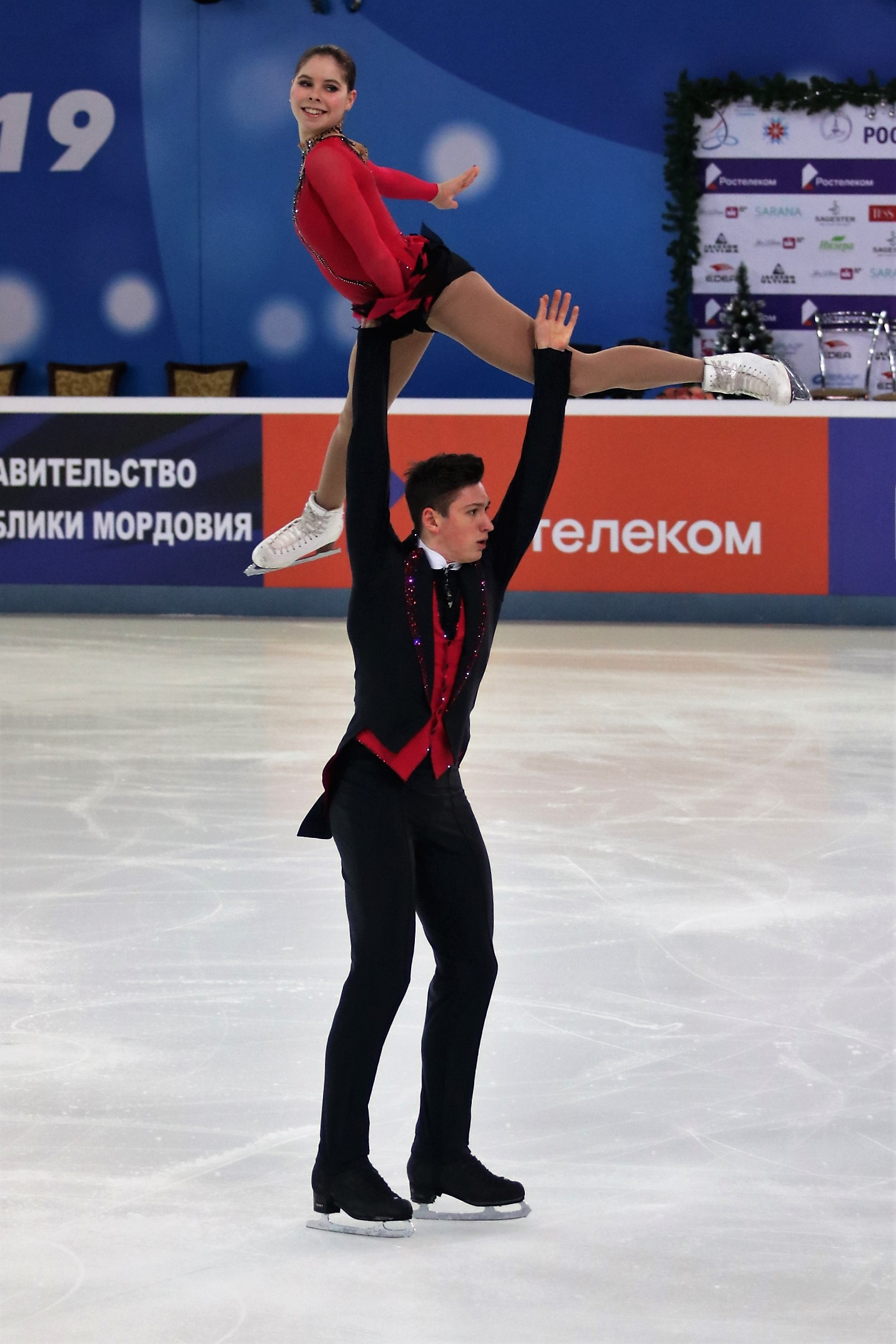
Anastasia Mishina and Aleksandr Galliamov currently hold the third-highest junior pairs' combined total and free skating scores.

Top 10 highest personal best scores in the pairs' free skating
Pl.	Female partner	Male partner	Nation	Score	Event
1	Anastasiia Metelkina	Luka Berulava	Georgia	131.63	2023-24 JGP Final
2	Apollinariia Panfilova	Dmitry Rylov	Russia	127.47	2020 Winter Youth Olympics
3	Polina Shesheleva	Egor Karnaukhov	Individual Neutral Athletes	126.30	2026 JGP China
4	Anastasia Mishina	Aleksandr Galliamov	Russia	126.26	2018–19 JGP Final
5	Ekaterina Chikmareva	Matvei Ianchenkov	Russia	124.99	2021 JGP Russia
6	Natalia Khabibullina	Ilya Knyazhuk	Russia	124.61	2021 JGP Austria
7	Polina Kostiukovich	Dmitrii Ialin	Russia	122.69	2018–19 JGP Final
8	Anastasia Golubeva	Hektor Giotopoulos Moore	Australia	121.18	2022–23 JGP Final
9	Karina Safina	Luka Berulava	Georgia	120.35	2022 World Junior Championships
10	Anastasia Mukhortova	Dmitry Evgenyev	Russia	119.80	2021 JGP Austria

=== Pairs' absolute best scores ===
Top 10 absolute best scores in the pairs' combined total
Pl.	Female partner	Male partner	Nation	Score	Event
1	Anastasiia Metelkina	Luka Berulava	Georgia	202.11	2023-24 JGP Final
2	Apollinariia Panfilova	Dmitry Rylov	Russia	199.21	2020 Winter Youth Olympics
3	Taisiia Guseva	Daniil Ovchinnikov	Individual Neutral Athletes	196,91	2026 JGP Ankara
4	Apollinariia Panfilova	Dmitry Rylov	Russia	195.96	2020 World Junior Championships
5	Apollinariia Panfilova	Dmitry Rylov	Russia	192.73	2019 JGP Poland
6	Polina Shesheleva	Egor Karnaukhov	Individual Neutral Athletes	191.84	2026 JGP China
7	Anastasiia Metelkina	Luka Berulava	Georgia	191.01	2025 World Junior Championships
8	Polina Shesheleva	Egor Karnaukhov	Individual Neutral Athletes	190.79	2026 JGP Ankara
9	Anastasia Mishina	Aleksandr Galliamov	Russia	190.63	2018–19 JGP Final
10	Anastasiia Metelkina	Luka Berulava	Georgia	190.45	2023 JGP Hungary

Top 10 absolute best scores in the pairs' short program
Pl.	Female partner	Male partner	Nation	Score	Event
1	Apollinariia Panfilova	Dmitry Rylov	Russia	73.71	2020 World Junior Championships
2	Apollinariia Panfilova	Dmitry Rylov	Russia	71.74	2020 Winter Youth Olympics
3	Anastasiia Metelkina	Luka Berulava	Georgia	71.53	2024 World Junior Championships
4	Apollinariia Panfilova	Dmitry Rylov	Russia	70.97	2019 JGP Poland
5	Anastasiia Metelkina	Luka Berulava	Georgia	70.48	2023-24 JGP Final
6	Taisiia Guseva	Daniil Ovchinnikov	Individual Neutral Athletes	70.48	2026 JGP Ankara
6	Kseniia Akhanteva	Valerii Kolesov	Russia	70.44	2020 World Junior Championships
7	Iuliia Artemeva	Mikhail Nazarychev	Russia	70.26	2020 World Junior Championships
8	Anastasiia Metelkina	Luka Berulava	Georgia	69.94	2023 JGP Hungary
9	Anastasiia Metelkina	Luka Berulava	Georgia	69.81	2025 World Junior Championships

Top 10 absolute best scores in the pairs' free skating
Pl.	Female partner	Male partner	Nation	Score	Event
1	Anastasiia Metelkina	Luka Berulava	Georgia	131.63	2023-24 JGP Final
2	Polina Shesheleva	Egor Karnaukhov	Individual Neutral Athletes	127.53	2026 JGP Ankara
3	Apollinariia Panfilova	Dmitry Rylov	Russia	127.47	2020 Winter Youth Olympics
4	Apollinariia Panfilova	Dmitry Rylov	Russia	126.49	2020 Winter Youth Olympics (team)
5	Taisiia Guseva	Daniil Ovchinnikov	Individual Neutral Athletes	126.43	2026 JGP Ankara
6	Polina Shesheleva	Egor Karnaukhov	Individual Neutral Athletes	126.30	2026 JGP China
7	Anastasia Mishina	Aleksandr Galliamov	Russia	126.26	2018–19 JGP Final
8	Ekaterina Chikmareva	Matvei Ianchenkov	Russia	124.99	2021 JGP Russia
9	Natalia Khabibullina	Ilya Knyazhuk	Russia	124.61	2021 JGP Austria
10	Polina Kostiukovich	Dmitrii Ialin	Russia	122.69	2018–19 JGP Final

=== Progression of pairs' highest scores ===
Progression of highest scores in the pairs' combined total
Date	Female partner	Male partner	Nation	Score	Event
August 24, 2018	Apollinariia Panfilova	Dmitry Rylov	Russia	173.37	2018 JGP Slovakia
August 24, 2018	Anastasia Mishina	Aleksandr Galliamov	Russia	184.80	2018 JGP Slovakia
September 15, 2018	Anastasia Mishina	Aleksandr Galliamov	Russia	187.71	2018 JGP Canada
December 8, 2018	Anastasia Mishina	Aleksandr Galliamov	Russia	190.63	2018–19 JGP Final
September 20, 2019	Apollinariia Panfilova	Dmitry Rylov	Russia	192.73	2019 JGP Poland
January 12, 2020	Apollinariia Panfilova	Dmitry Rylov	Russia	199.21	2020 Winter Youth Olympics
December 9, 2023	Anastasiia Metelkina	Luka Berulava	Georgia	202.11	2023-24 JGP Final

Progression of highest scores in the pairs' short program
Date	Female partner	Male partner	Nation	Score	Event
August 23, 2018	Apollinariia Panfilova	Dmitry Rylov	Russia	57.95	2018 JGP Slovakia
August 23, 2018	Kseniia Akhanteva	Valerii Kolesov	Russia	60.14	2018 JGP Slovakia
August 23, 2018	Anastasia Mishina	Aleksandr Galliamov	Russia	64.38	2018 JGP Slovakia
September 14, 2018	Anastasia Mishina	Aleksandr Galliamov	Russia	65.22	2018 JGP Canada
September 27, 2018	Polina Kostiukovich	Dmitrii Ialin	Russia	66.30	2018 JGP Czech Republic
December 6, 2018	Apollinariia Panfilova	Dmitry Rylov	Russia	66.44	2018–19 JGP Final
December 6, 2018	Polina Kostiukovich	Dmitrii Ialin	Russia	66.84	2018–19 JGP Final
March 6, 2019	Anastasia Mishina	Aleksandr Galliamov	Russia	67.02	2019 World Junior Championships
March 6, 2019	Apollinariia Panfilova	Dmitry Rylov	Russia	67.91	2019 World Junior Championships
March 6, 2019	Polina Kostiukovich	Dmitrii Ialin	Russia	68.31	2019 World Junior Championships
September 19, 2019	Apollinariia Panfilova	Dmitry Rylov	Russia	70.97	2019 JGP Poland
January 10, 2020	Apollinariia Panfilova	Dmitry Rylov	Russia	71.74	2020 Winter Youth Olympics
March 4, 2020	Apollinariia Panfilova	Dmitry Rylov	Russia	73.71	2020 World Junior Championships

Progression of highest scores in the pairs' free skating
Date	Female partner	Male partner	Nation	Score	Event
August 24, 2018	Apollinariia Panfilova	Dmitry Rylov	Russia	115.42	2018 JGP Slovakia
August 24, 2018	Anastasia Mishina	Aleksandr Galliamov	Russia	120.42	2018 JGP Slovakia
September 15, 2018	Anastasia Mishina	Aleksandr Galliamov	Russia	122.49	2018 JGP Canada
December 8, 2018	Anastasia Mishina	Aleksandr Galliamov	Russia	126.26	2018–19 JGP Final
January 12, 2020	Apollinariia Panfilova	Dmitry Rylov	Russia	127.47	2020 Winter Youth Olympics
December 9, 2023	Anastasiia Metelkina	Luka Berulava	Georgia	131.63	2023-24 JGP Final

== Ice dance ==
=== Highest personal best scores in ice dance ===
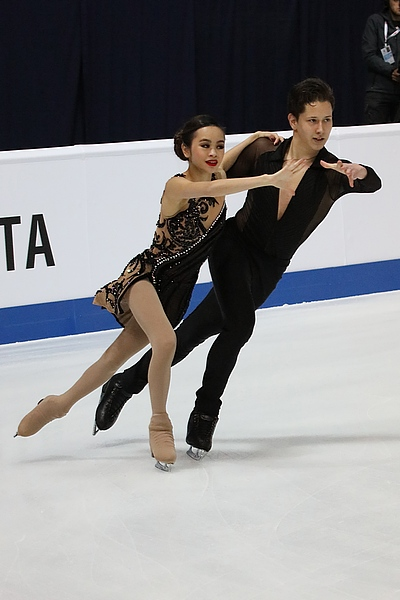
Avonley Nguyen and Vadym Kolesnik hold the third-highest combined total score of the junior ice dance.

Top 10 highest personal best scores in the combined total (ice dance)
Pl.	Female partner	Male partner	Nation	Score	Event
1	Noemi Maria Tali	Noah Lafornara	Italy	177.50	2025 World Junior Championships
2	Kateřina Mrázková	Daniel Mrázek	Czech Republic	177.36	2023 World Junior Championships
3	Avonley Nguyen	Vadym Kolesnik	United States	177.18	2020 World Junior Championships
4	Leah Neset	Artem Markelov	United States	177.09	2023–24 JGP Final
5	Maria Kazakova	Georgy Reviya	Georgia	176.19	2020 World Junior Championships
6	Marjorie Lajoie	Zachary Lagha	Canada	176.10	2019 World Junior Championships
7	Elizaveta Shanaeva	Devid Naryzhnyy	Russia	175.17	2020 World Junior Championships
8	Hannah Lim	Ye Quan	South Korea	174.39	2023 World Junior Championships
9	Arina Ushakova	Maxim Nekrasov	Russia	172.81	2018 JGP Armenia
10	Nadiia Bashynska	Peter Beaumont	Canada	171.61	2022 JGP Poland II

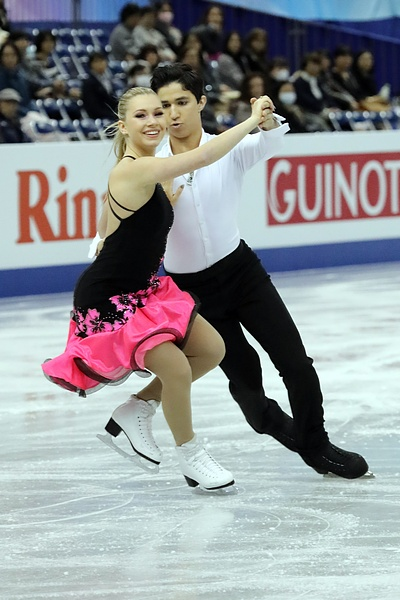
Marjorie Lajoie and Zachary Lagha hold the fifth-highest score for the junior ice rhythm dance.

Top 10 highest personal best scores in the rhythm dance
Pl.	Female partner	Male partner	Nation	Score	Event
1	Leah Neset	Artem Markelov	United States	72.48	2023–24 JGP Final
2	Kateřina Mrázková	Daniel Mrázek	Czech Republic	71.87	2022 JGP Italy
3	Hannah Lim	Ye Quan	South Korea	71.08	2023 World Junior Championships
4	Noemi Maria Tali	Noah Lafornara	Italy	70.92	2025 World Junior Championships
5	Marjorie Lajoie	Zachary Lagha	Canada	70.14	2019 World Junior Championships
6	Elizaveta Shanaeva	Devid Naryzhnyy	Russia	70.03	2020 World Junior Championships
7	Maria Kazakova	Georgy Reviya	Georgia	69.98	2020 World Junior Championships
8	Nadiia Bashynska	Peter Beaumont	Canada	69.56	2022 JGP Poland II
9	Avonley Nguyen	Vadym Kolesnik	United States	69.20	2019 JGP Poland
10	Arina Ushakova	Maxim Nekrasov	Russia	69.18	2018 JGP Armenia

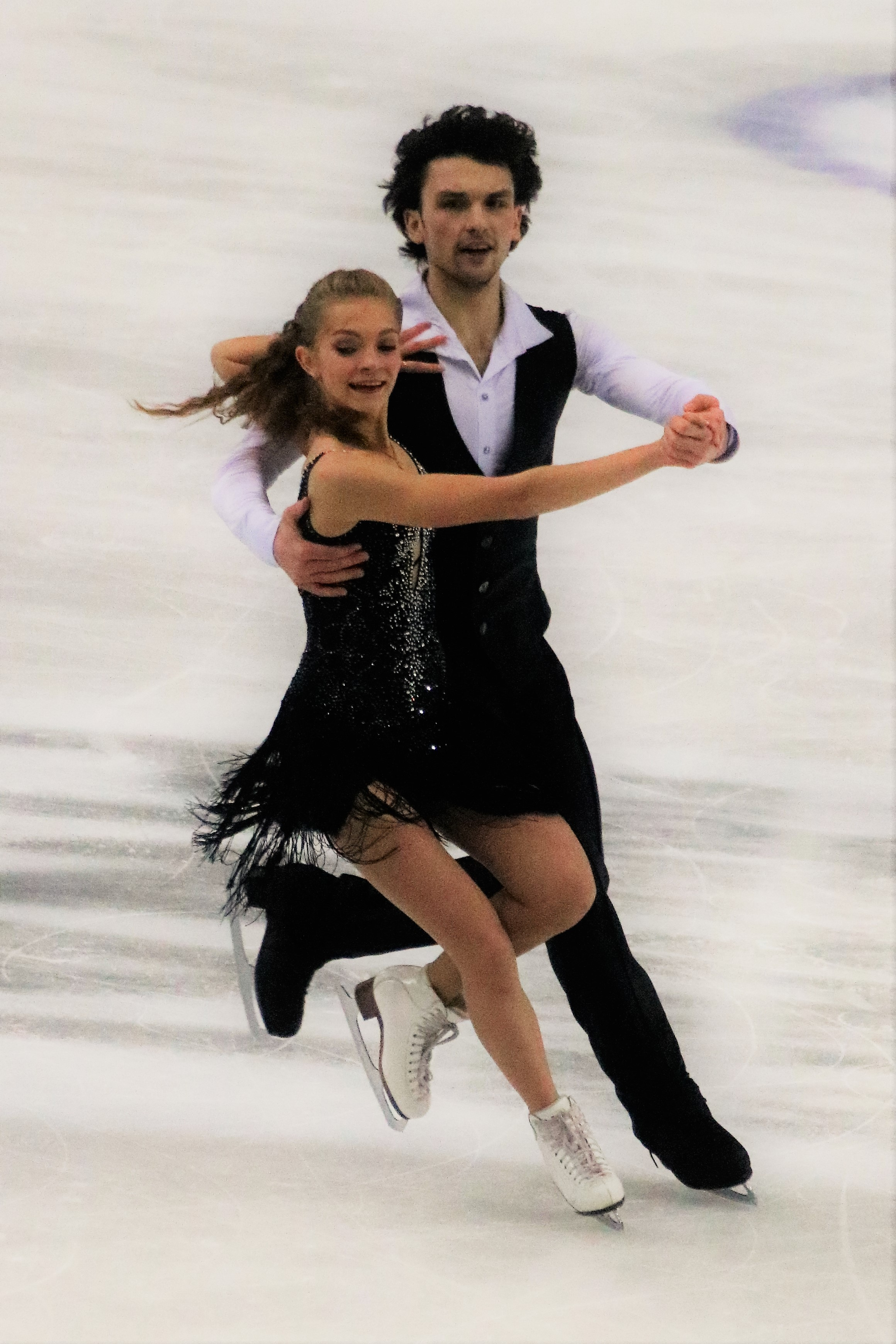
Maria Kazakova and Georgy Reviya currently hold the fifth-highest junior ice dance combined total and third-highest free dance scores.

Top 10 highest personal best scores in the free dance
Pl.	Female partner	Male partner	Nation	Score	Event
1	Avonley Nguyen	Vadym Kolesnik	United States	108.91	2020 World Junior Championships
2	Noemi Maria Tali	Noah Lafornara	Italy	106.58	2025 World Junior Championships
3	Maria Kazakova	Georgy Reviya	Georgia	106.21	2020 World Junior Championships
4	Kateřina Mrázková	Daniel Mrázek	Czech Republic	106.17	2023 World Junior Championships
5	Marjorie Lajoie	Zachary Lagha	Canada	105.96	2019 World Junior Championships
6	Elizaveta Shanaeva	Devid Naryzhnyy	Russia	105.14	2020 World Junior Championships
7	Leah Neset	Artem Markelov	United States	104.61	2023–24 JGP Final
8	Arina Ushakova	Maxim Nekrasov	Russia	103.63	2018 JGP Armenia
9	Hannah Lim	Ye Quan	South Korea	103.31	2023 World Junior Championships
10	Oona Brown	Gage Brown	United States	103.27	2022 World Junior Championships

=== Absolute best scores in ice dance ===
Top 10 absolute best scores in the combined total (ice dance)
Pl.	Female partner	Male partner	Nation	Score	Event
1	Noemi Maria Tali	Noah Lafornara	Italy	177.50	2025 World Junior Championships
2	Kateřina Mrázková	Daniel Mrázek	Czech Republic	177.36	2023 World Junior Championships
3	Avonley Nguyen	Vadym Kolesnik	United States	177.18	2020 World Junior Championships
4	Leah Neset	Artem Markelov	United States	177.09	2023–24 JGP Final
5	Kateřina Mrázková	Daniel Mrázek	Czech Republic	176.26	2022 JGP Czech Republic
6	Maria Kazakova	Georgy Reviya	Georgia	176.19	2020 World Junior Championships
7	Marjorie Lajoie	Zachary Lagha	Canada	176.10	2019 World Junior Championships
8	Elizaveta Shanaeva	Devid Naryzhnyy	Russia	175.17	2020 World Junior Championships
9	Maria Kazakova	Georgy Reviya	Georgia	174.90	2019–20 JGP Final
10	Avonley Nguyen	Vadym Kolesnik	United States	174.74	2019–20 JGP Final

Top 10 absolute best scores in the rhythm dance
Pl.	Female partner	Male partner	Nation	Score	Event
1	Leah Neset	Artem Markelov	United States	72.48	2023–24 JGP Final
2	Kateřina Mrázková	Daniel Mrázek	Czech Republic	71.87	2022 JGP Italy
3	Kateřina Mrázková	Daniel Mrázek	Czech Republic	71.19	2023 World Junior Championships
4	Hannah Lim	Ye Quan	South Korea	71.08	2023 World Junior Championships
5	Noemi Maria Tali	Noah Lafornara	Italy	70.92	2025 World Junior Championships
6	Kateřina Mrázková	Daniel Mrázek	Czech Republic	70.83	2022 JGP Czech Republic
7	Marjorie Lajoie	Zachary Lagha	Canada	70.14	2019 World Junior Championships
8	Elizaveta Shanaeva	Devid Naryzhnyy	Russia	70.03	2020 World Junior Championships
9	Maria Kazakova	Georgy Reviya	Georgia	69.98	2020 World Junior Championships
10	Nadiia Bashynska	Peter Beaumont	Canada	69.56	2022 JGP Poland II

Top 10 absolute best scores in the free dance
Pl.	Female partner	Male partner	Nation	Score	Event
1	Avonley Nguyen	Vadym Kolesnik	United States	108.91	2020 World Junior Championships
2	Noemi Maria Tali	Noah Lafornara	Italy	106.58	2025 World Junior Championships
3	Maria Kazakova	Georgy Reviya	Georgia	106.21	2020 World Junior Championships
4	Kateřina Mrázková	Daniel Mrázek	Czech Republic	106.17	2023 World Junior Championships
5	Maria Kazakova	Georgy Reviya	Georgia	106.14	2019–20 JGP Final
6	Avonley Nguyen	Vadym Kolesnik	United States	106.02	2019–20 JGP Final
7	Marjorie Lajoie	Zachary Lagha	Canada	105.96	2019 World Junior Championships
8	Avonley Nguyen	Vadym Kolesnik	United States	105.48	2019 JGP Poland
9	Kateřina Mrázková	Daniel Mrázek	Czech Republic	105.43	2022 JGP Czech Republic
10	Elizaveta Shanaeva	Devid Naryzhnyy	Russia	105.14	2020 World Junior Championships

=== Progression of highest scores in ice dance ===
Progression of highest scores in the combined total (ice dance)
Date	Female partner	Male partner	Nation	Score	Event
August 25, 2018	Eliana Gropman	Ian Somerville	United States	148.51	2018 JGP Slovakia
August 25, 2018	Elizaveta Shanaeva	Devid Naryzhnyy	Russia	152.21	2018 JGP Slovakia
August 25, 2018	Elizaveta Khudaiberdieva	Nikita Nazarov	Russia	159.62	2018 JGP Slovakia
September 8, 2018	Arina Ushakova	Maxim Nekrasov	Russia	168.17	2018 JGP Lithuania
October 13, 2018	Arina Ushakova	Maxim Nekrasov	Russia	172.81	2018 JGP Armenia
March 9, 2019	Marjorie Lajoie	Zachary Lagha	Canada	176.10	2019 World Junior Championships
March 7, 2020	Maria Kazakova	Georgy Reviya	Georgia	176.19	2020 World Junior Championships
March 7, 2020	Avonley Nguyen	Vadym Kolesnik	United States	177.18	2020 World Junior Championships
March 4, 2023	Kateřina Mrázková	Daniel Mrázek	Czech Republic	177.36	2023 World Junior Championships
February 27, 2025	Noemi Maria Tali	Noah Lafornara	Italy	177.50	2025 World Junior Championships

Progression of highest scores in the rhythm dance
Date	Female partner	Male partner	Nation	Score	Event
August 24, 2018	Elizaveta Shanaeva	Devid Naryzhnyy	Russia	60.30	2018 JGP Slovakia
August 24, 2018	Elizaveta Khudaiberdieva	Nikita Nazarov	Russia	64.39	2018 JGP Slovakia
September 7, 2018	Arina Ushakova	Maxim Nekrasov	Russia	67.63	2018 JGP Lithuania
October 12, 2018	Arina Ushakova	Maxim Nekrasov	Russia	69.18	2018 JGP Armenia
March 7, 2019	Marjorie Lajoie	Zachary Lagha	Canada	70.14	2019 World Junior Championships
September 2, 2022	Kateřina Mrázková	Daniel Mrázek	Czech Republic	70.83	2022 JGP Czech Republic
October 13, 2022	Kateřina Mrázková	Daniel Mrázek	Czech Republic	71.87	2022 JGP Italy
December 9, 2023	Leah Neset	Artem Markelov	United States	72.48	2023–24 JGP Final

Progression of highest scores in the free dance
Date	Female partner	Male partner	Nation	Score	Event
August 25, 2018	Eliana Gropman	Ian Somerville	United States	88.59	2018 JGP Slovakia
August 25, 2018	Elizaveta Shanaeva	Devid Naryzhnyy	Russia	91.91	2018 JGP Slovakia
August 25, 2018	Elizaveta Khudaiberdieva	Nikita Nazarov	Russia	95.23	2018 JGP Slovakia
September 8, 2018	Arina Ushakova	Maxim Nekrasov	Russia	100.54	2018 JGP Lithuania
September 14, 2018	Marjorie Lajoie	Zachary Lagha	Canada	100.95	2018 JGP Canada
October 13, 2018	Arina Ushakova	Maxim Nekrasov	Russia	103.63	2018 JGP Armenia
March 9, 2019	Marjorie Lajoie	Zachary Lagha	Canada	105.96	2019 World Junior Championships
December 7, 2019	Maria Kazakova	Georgy Reviya	Georgia	106.14	2019–20 JGP Final
March 7, 2020	Maria Kazakova	Georgy Reviya	Georgia	106.21	2020 World Junior Championships
March 7, 2020	Avonley Nguyen	Vadym Kolesnik	United States	108.91	2020 World Junior Championships

== See also ==
- List of highest scores in figure skating
- List of highest historical scores in figure skating
- List of highest historical junior scores in figure skating
- ISU Judging System
