= Daniil Samsonov =

Russian figure skater

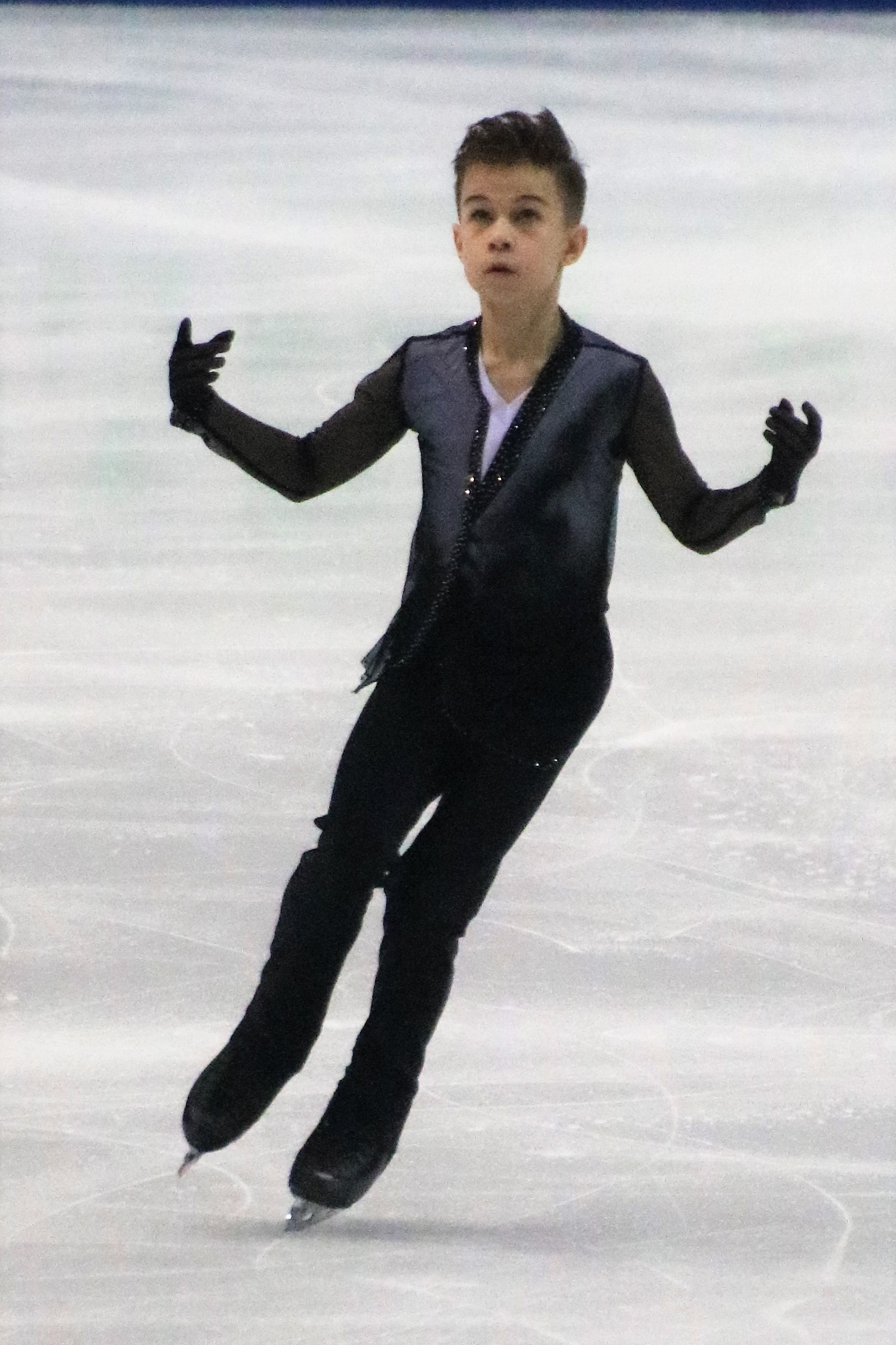
- Samsonov at the 2019–20 Junior Grand Prix Final

Personal information
- Native name: Даниил Александрович Самсонов
- Full name: Daniil Aleksandrovich Samsonov
- Born: 13 July 2005 (age 21) Moscow, Russia
- Height: 1.50 m (4 ft 11 in)

Figure skating career
- Country: (Individual Neutral Athletes) Individual Neutral Athlete; Russia
- Coach: Svetlana Sokolovskaya
- Skating club: Navka Academy
- Began skating: 2008
Medal record
Representing Russia
Winter Youth Olympics
Bronze medal – third place	2020 Lausanne	Men's singles
Junior Grand Prix Final
Bronze medal – third place	2019–20 Turin	Men's singles

Daniil Aleksandrovich Samsonov (Russian: Даниил Александрович Самсонов; born 13 July 2005) is a Russian figure skater who currently competes as an Individual Neutral Athlete, who formerly held three junior world records for men's skating.

He is the 2020 Youth Olympic bronze medalist, the 2019 Junior Grand Prix Final bronze medalist, the 2019 JGP Poland champion, the 2019 Winter Children of Asia International Sports Games champion, and a two-time Russian junior national champion (2019, 2020).

== Career ==
He was born in Moscow, Russia. Daniil Samsonov formerly trained under Alexander Shubin at Moskvich, and has been training under Eteri Tutberidze at Sambo 70 since the start of the 2015/2016 season.

Since 2025, he has been training at the Figure Skating Academy at the Navka Arena under the guidance of Svetlana Vladimirovna Sokolovskaya.

=== 2018–2019 season ===
In early February 2019, Samsonov won the Russian Junior Figure Skating Championships. "[The boy] skated breathtakingly. At such an [early] age, to jump a quadruple Lutz, so beautifully, so easily, that had never happened before in the world," Tatiana Tarasova said of his victory. Samsonov was not sent to the 2019 World Junior Championships because he would not be age eligible to compete at junior level internationally until the following (2019/2020) season; his thirteenth birthday was July 13, twelve days past the July 1 cutoff.

A few days later, he was one of the skaters who represented Russia in Sakhalin at the first Children of Asia Games, winning the gold medal.

=== 2019–2020 season ===
In early September 2019, Samsonov made his ISU Junior Grand Prix debut at the 2019 JGP event in Riga, Latvia, where he won the bronze medal. He ranked fourth in the short program and third in the free skate and scored his personal best score of 211.62 points. Two weeks later, he competed at this second JGP event of the season in Gdańsk, Poland, where he won his first JGP gold medal. At this competition, he set the new world record scores for the short program (87.33 points), free skate (163.18 points) and the combined total (250.51 points). Ranked first in both the short program and the free skate, he outscored the silver medalist, Japanese skater Yuma Kagiyama, by about 5 points.

Qualifying to the 2019–20 Junior Grand Prix Final in Turin, Samsonov placed second in the short program despite falling on his opening triple Axel. After several minor jump errors in the free skate, he placed fourth in that segment, and won the bronze medal overall. He described himself as "unhappy" with how he had performed.

Competing at the senior-level 2020 Russian Championships for the first time, Samsonov was seventh in the short program after stepping out of his quad Lutz and falling on his triple Axel. Fifth in the free skate, he rose to sixth place overall. Samsonov later competed at the 2020 Russian Junior Championships, where he placed second in both the short and free programs but finished first overall due to a large ordinal gap from free skate winner Andrei Mozalev, earning him his second junior national title. Due to this result, he was initially named to the team for the 2020 World Junior Figure Skating Championships; however, on 28 February 2020, it was announced that he'd withdrawn from the competition due to joint problems caused by growth. He was replaced at the event by Ilya Yablokov. Samsonov later clarified that his withdrawal from the event was due to pain associated with Osgood-Schlatter disease.

=== 2020–2021 season ===
Samsonov missed the first half of the season due to treatment for Osgood-Schlatter disease, including time spent with a specialist in Germany. Samsonov returned to training in October. He competed at the 2021 Russian Junior Championships where he placed seventh overall.

=== 2021–2022 season ===
Samsonov withdrew from the senior Russian test skates, citing medical reasons. He subsequently withdrew as well from the 2021 Skate America, which was scheduled to be his senior Grand Prix debut.

=== 2026–2027 season ===
On 30 June 2026, the International Skating Union announced that figure skaters from Russia and Belarus would be allowed to compete at international competitions as Individual Neutral Athletes (AINs). Each of these skaters are required to undergo an individual assessment conducted by the ISU Council to determine whether they meet the criteria for neutral status. Samsonov's application was approved, allowing him to compete as a neutral athlete.

== Records and achievements ==
- Set the junior-level men's short program record (87.33 points), free skating record (163.18 points) and combined total record (250.51 points) at 2019 JGP Poland. Free skating and combined total records were later surpassed by Shun Sato at the 2019–20 Junior Grand Prix Final. Short program record has later been surpassed by Ilia Malinin at the 2022 Junior Worlds, although Samsonov still holds the record for Technical Element Scores of the short program.

== Programs ==
Season	Short program	Free skating	Exhibition
2025-2026	Main Theme (from Mission: Impossible) by Lalo Schifrin; Friction by Imagine Dragons	The House of the Rising Sun performed by Heavy Young Heathens	
2024-2025	Fallin' by Alicia Keys performed by Nicola Cavallero choreo. by Daniil Gleikhengauz	The Plaza of Execution; Zorro's Theme; The Fencing Lession (from The Mask of Zorro) by James Horner choreo. by Daniil Gleikhengauz	
2023-2024	Hallelujah by Leonard Cohen performed by Jeff Buckley choreo. by Daniil Gleikhengauz	I Love You by Woodkid; Come Together by The Beatles choreo. by Daniil Gleikhengauz	
2022–2023	Prelude in C-sharp minor by Sergei Rachmaninoff choreo. by Daniil Gleikhengauz	I Love You by Woodkid; Come Together by The Beatles choreo. by Daniil Gleikhengauz	
2021–2022	Prelude in C-sharp minor by Sergei Rachmaninoff choreo. by Daniil Gleikhengauz	I Love You by Woodkid; Come Together by The Beatles choreo. by Daniil Gleikhengauz	I Love You by Woodkid; Come Together by The Beatles choreo. by Daniil Gleikhengauz
2020–2021	Prelude in C-sharp minor by Sergei Rachmaninoff choreo. by Daniil Gleikhengauz	Exogenesis: Symphony Part 2 by Muse	
2019–2020	Rain, in Your Black Eyes by Ezio Bosso	Per te by Josh Groban	

== Competitive highlights ==
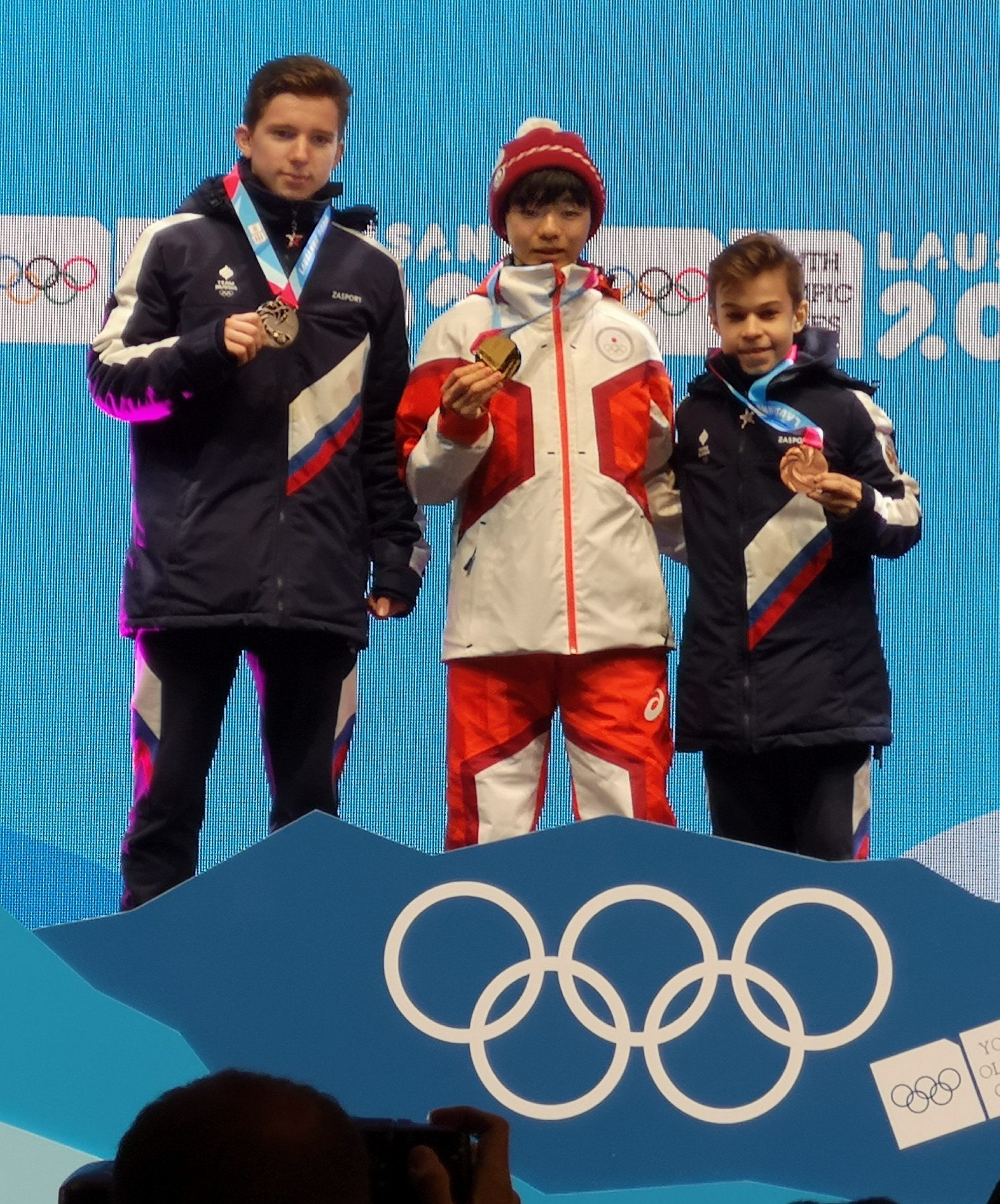
Samsonov (right) with Andrei Mozalev (left) and Yuma Kagiyama (center) on the 2020 Winter Youth Olympics podium

GP: Grand Prix; JGP: Junior Grand Prix

=== Skating as an Individual Neutral Athlete ===
Competition placements at senior level
Season	2026–27
Denkova-Staviski Cup	1st

=== Skating for Russia ===
International
Event	17–18	18–19	19–20	20–21	21–22	23–24	24–25	25-26
GP NHK Trophy					WD			
GP Skate America					WD			
International: Junior
Youth Olympics			3rd					
Junior Worlds			WD					
JGP Final			3rd					
JGP Latvia			3rd					
JGP Poland			1st					
Children of Asia ISG		1st						
Denis Ten Memorial			1st					
National
Russian Champ.			6th		WD	5th	7th	19th
Russian Junior Champ.	9th	1st	1st	7th				
Russian Cup Final	4th J					8th		
TBD = Assigned; WD = Withdrew

== Detailed results ==
=== Senior level ===
**2024–2025 season**
Date	Event	SP	FS	Total
18–22 December 2024	2025 Russian Championships	8; 91.09	6; 172.87	7; 263.96
**2023–2024 season**
Date	Event	SP	FS	Total
20–24 December 2023	2024 Russian Championships	8; 86.97	5; 178.66	5; 265.63

=== Junior level ===
Personal best highlighted in bold.

**2020–21 season**
Date	Event	Level	SP	FS	Total
1–5 February 2021	2021 Russian Junior Championships	Junior	4; 83.40	9; 142.80	7; 226.20
**2019–20 season**
Date	Event	Level	SP	FS	Total
4–8 February 2020	2020 Russian Junior Championships	Junior	2; 84.40	2; 176.82	1; 261.22
10–15 January 2020	2020 Winter Youth Olympics	Junior	2; 76.63	3; 138.59	3; 215.21
24–29 December 2019	2020 Russian Championships	Senior	7; 80.88	5; 159.33	6; 240.21
5–8 December 2019	2019–20 JGP Final	Junior	2; 77.75	4; 152.44	3; 230.19
9–12 October 2019	2019 Denis Ten Memorial Challenge	Junior	1; 88.64	1; 175.40	1; 264.04
18–21 September 2019	2019 JGP Poland	Junior	1; **87.33**	1; **163.18**	1; **250.51**
4–7 September 2019	2019 JGP Latvia	Junior	4; 72.28	3; 139.34	3; 211.62
**2018–19 season**
Date	Event	Level	SP	FS	Total
13–15 February 2019	2019 WCAISG	Junior	1; 84.95	1; 153.11	1; 238.06
1–4 February 2019	2019 Russian Junior Championships	Junior	1; 87.07	1; 162.26	1; 249.33
**2017–18 season**
Date	Event	Level	SP	FS	Total
23–26 January 2018	2018 Russian Junior Championships	Junior	12; 70.00	9; 140.26	9; 210.26

World Junior Record Holders
Preceded by (Russia) Artur Danielian	Men's Junior Short Program; 19 September 2019 – 14 April 2022	Succeeded by (United States) Ilia Malinin
Preceded by (Japan) Yuma Kagiyama	Men's Junior Free Skating; 21 September 2019 – 7 December 2019	Succeeded by (Japan) Shun Sato
Preceded by (Japan) Yuma Kagiyama	Men's Junior Total Score; 21 September 2019 – 7 December 2019	Succeeded by (Japan) Shun Sato
