= Polina Kostiukovich =

Russian pair skater (born 2003)

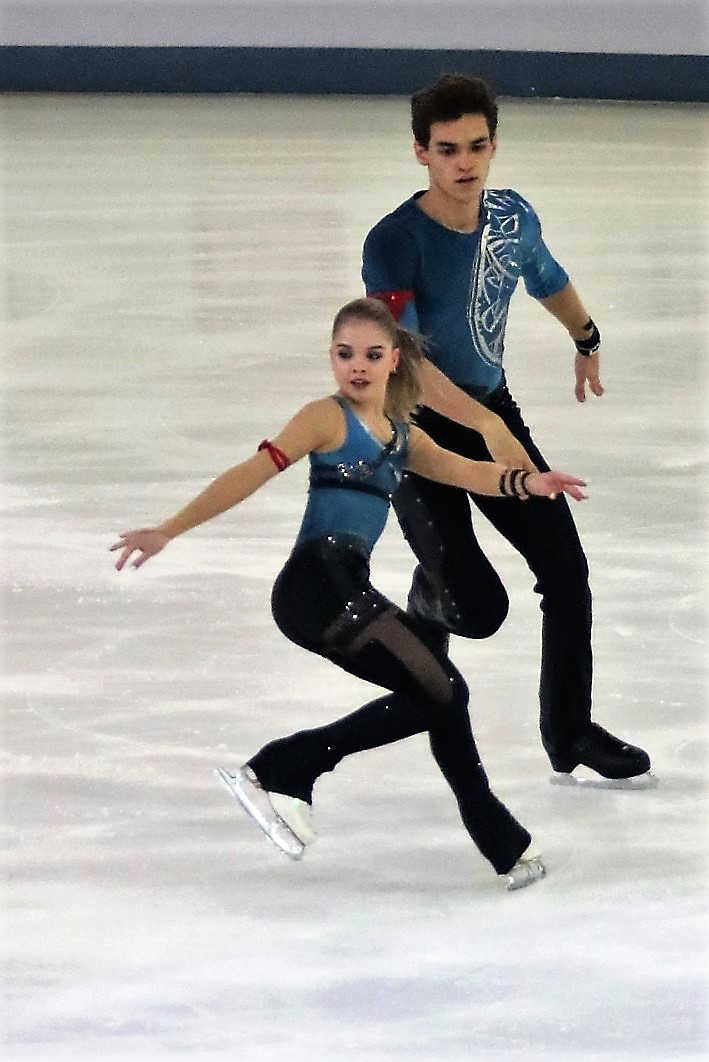
- Kostiukovich/Ialin at the 2019 Russian Figure Skating Championships

Personal information
- Native name: Полина Андреевна Костюкович
- Full name: Polina Andreevna Kostiukovich
- Other names: Polina Kostyukovich
- Born: 7 March 2003 (age 23) Saint Petersburg, Russia
- Home town: Moscow, Russia

Figure skating career
- Country: Russia
- Coach: Vladislav Zhovnirski, Arina Ushakova
- Skating club: Vorobyovy Gory, Moscow
- Began skating: 2009
- Retired: January 4, 2023
Medal record
Representing Russia
Figure skating: Pairs (with Ialin)
World Junior Championships
Silver medal – second place	2018 Sofia	Pairs
Bronze medal – third place	2019 Zagreb	Pairs
Junior Grand Prix Final
Silver medal – second place	2018–19 Vancouver	Pairs

Polina Andreevna Kostiukovich (Russian: Полина Андреевна Костюкович, born 7 March 2003) is a retired Russian pair skater. With her former skating partner, Dmitrii Ialin, she is the 2018 World Junior and the 2018–19 Junior Grand Prix Final silver medalist, and the 2019 World Junior bronze medalist. She is also the 2017 JGP Croatia and the 2018 JGP Austria champion.

== Career ==
=== Early years ===
Kostiukovich began learning to skate in 2009. She trained as a single skater until 2016.

Kostiukovich and Dmitrii Ialin began competing together in 2016. They were coached by Vasili Velikov in Saint Petersburg.

=== 2017–2018 season: Silver at Junior Worlds ===
Kostiukovich/Ialin made their international debut in late September 2017 at the Junior Grand Prix (JGP) competition in Zagreb, Croatia, where they won the gold medal. They beat the silver medalist, Gao Yumeng / Xie Zhong, by less than one point and the bronze medalist, their teammates Aleksandra Boikova / Dmitrii Kozlovskii, by about two points. At this competition Kostiukovich/Ialin performed a level 3 quad twist which is rarely seen even at senior competitions. They received 10.46 points for that twist.

In January 2018 Kostiukovich/Ialin won the bronze medal at the 2018 Russian Junior Championships after placing eleventh in the short program and second in the free skate.

In March 2018 Kostiukovich/Ialin competed at the 2018 Junior Worlds where they won the silver medal after placing second in the short program and third in the free skate. They were part of a Russian sweep of the pairs' podium, along with their training partners Anastasia Mishina / Aleksandr Galliamov (bronze) and Daria Pavliuchenko / Denis Khodykin (gold).

=== 2018–2019 season: Bronze at Junior Worlds ===
Kostiukovich/Ialin started their season by competing in the 2018 Junior Grand Prix series. At their first Junior Grand Prix event of the season they won the gold medal in Linz, Austria. They were ranked first in both the short program and the free skate and won the gold medal by a margin of more than 14 points over the silver medalist, their teammates Anastasia Poluianova / Dmitry Sopot. At their second JGP event of the season they won the silver medal in Ostrava, Czech Republic. They were ranked first in the short program and second in the free skate, and were beaten by the gold medalists, their teammates and training partners Kseniia Akhanteva / Valerii Kolesov by a margin of about 4 points. At this event they set the junior-level pairs' record for the short program (66.30 points). With these results they qualified for the 2018–19 Junior Grand Prix Final.

At the JGP Final, Kostiukovich/Ialin won the silver medal after placing first in the short program and second in the free skate. They were part of a Russian sweep of the pairs' podium. Kostiukovich/Ialin beat the bronze medalists, Apollinariia Panfilova / Dmitry Rylov, by about 3 points but the race for the gold medal were really tight. The gold medalists, their training partners Mishina/Galliamov, beat Kostiukovich/Ialin by a margin of only 1.1 point. At this event Kostiukovich/Ialin scored their personal best score of 189.53 points and they also upgraded their junior-level pairs' record for the short program (66.84 points).

At the 2019 Russian Championships, Kostiukovich/Ialin placed eighth in the senior event and second in the junior event, and were assigned to the 2019 World Junior Championships alongside Mishina/Galliamov and Panfilova/Rylov. They won the short program at Junior Worlds, narrowly ahead of both of the other Russian teams, and were awarded a gold small medal for the result. In the free skate, they had underrotations called on their combination jump and Kostiukovich fell on a throw triple Salchow. As a result, they finished third in the free skate and third overall. Ialin admitted "unfortunately, not everything worked out today." Kostiukovich expressed the hope that "at our next Junior World Championships we can improve, fix our mistakes, and gain experience to be able to win."

=== 2019–2020 season: Struggles and end of partnership with Ialin ===
Kostiukovich/Ialin were initially assigned to the 2019 ISU JGP Croatia Cup in Zagreb, Croatia. However, they withdrew from the event due to puberty-related struggles faced by Kostiukovich. The team continued to compete domestically, qualifying for both the senior and junior-level Russian championships through the Russian Cup series.

Kostiukovich/Ialin placed eighth at 2020 Russian Championships in January, and later placed fifth at the junior championships in February, missing the podium for the first time in two seasons. On 13 March 2020, the pair announced the amicable end to their partnership. On 18 July 2020, Kostiukovich announced on Instagram that she had teamed up with Aleksei Briukhanov.

=== 2020–21 season: Debut of Kostiukovich/Briukhanov ===
Kostiukovich and her new partner, Aleksei Briukhanov, made their debut in Moscow at the second stage of the domestic Russian Cup series, the qualifying competition series to the 2021 senior and junior Russian Championships. They placed fourth at the 2021 Russian Junior Championships. In April, Kostiukovich and Briukhanov parted ways with their longtime coaches Ludmila Velikova, Nikolai Velikov, and Vasili Velkikov to move to the camp of Vladislav Zhovnirski and Arina Ushakova in Moscow.

=== 2021–22 season ===
With the resumption of international junior competition following the COVID-19 pandemic prompting the cancellation of the 2020–21 international junior season, Kostiukovich/Briukhanov made their debut on the Junior Grand Prix at the 2021 JGP Slovakia. They won the bronze medal.

== Programs ==
=== With Briukhanov ===
Season	Short program	Free skating
2021–2022	Earned It (from Fifty Shades of Gray) by The Weeknd choreo. by Tatiana Druchinina	Nature Boy performed by David Bowie; Unstoppable by E.S. Posthumus; Nature Boy performed by Celine Dion choreo. by Tatiana Druchinina
2020–2021	Warriors by Imagine Dragons	Pictures at an Exhibition The Hut on Hen's Legs (Baba Yaga) by Modest Mussorgsky

=== With Ialin ===
Season	Short program	Free skating	Exhibition
2019–2020	Smoke on the Water by Deep Purple performed by 2WEI choreo. by Denis Lunin	Sarabande Suite (Aeternae) by Globus choreo. by Denis Lunin	
2018–2019	Survivor (from Tomb Raider) by Destiny's Child performed by 2WEI	Selection (from Cirque du Soleil); Xotica: Journey to the Heart (from René Dupéré)	
2017–2018	Malaguena by Ernesto Lecuona	Xotica (from Cirque du Soleil)	Ego by Willy William

== Records and achievements ==
(with Ialin)

- Set the junior-level pairs' record of the new +5 / -5 GOE (Grade of Execution) system for the short program (66.30 points) at the 2018 JGP Czech Republic.
- Upgraded their junior-level pairs' record for the short program (66.84 points) at the 2018–19 JGP Final.
- Upgraded their junior-level pairs' record for the short program (68.31 points) at the 2019 World Junior Championships. This record was later broken by Apollinariia Panfilova / Dmitry Rylov at the 2019 JGP Poland.

== Competitive highlights ==
JGP: Junior Grand Prix

=== With Briukhanov ===
International
Event	20–21	21–22
CS Golden Spin		WD
International: Junior
JGP Poland		3rd
JGP Slovakia		3rd
National
Russian Jr. Champ.	4th	6th
TBD = Assigned

=== With Ialin ===
International
Event	17–18	18–19	19–20
Junior Worlds	2nd	3rd	
JGP Final		2nd	
JGP Austria		1st	
JGP Croatia	1st		WD
JGP Czech Republic		2nd	
JGP Poland	6th		WD
National
Russian Champ.		8th	8th
Russian Jr. Champ.	3rd	2nd	5th
TBD = Assigned; WD = Withdrew

== Detailed results ==
Small medals for short and free programs awarded only at ISU Championships.

=== With Briukhanov ===
2021–22 season
Date	Event	Level	SP	FS	Total
18–22 January 2022	2022 Russian Junior Championships	Junior	6; 67.81	6; 116.23	6; 184.04
29 September – 2 October 2021	2021 JGP Poland	Junior	1; 63.76	4; 98.38	3; 163.14
1–4 September 2021	2021 JGP Slovakia	Junior	4; 56.37	3; 102.45	3; 158.82
2020–21 season
26 February–2 March 2021	2020 Russian Cup Series, Final, Moscow domestic competition	Junior	4; 66.41	3; 116.45	3; 182.86
1–5 February 2021	2021 Russian Junior Championships	Junior	4; 67.38	4; 119.95	4; 187.33
23–27 October 2020	2020 Russian Cup Series, 3rd Stage, Sochi domestic competition	Junior	1; 69.68	1; 115.89	1; 185.57
10–13 October 2020	2020 Russian Cup Series, 2nd Stage, Moscow domestic competition	Junior	1; 65.93	1; 112.86	1; 178.79

=== With Ialin ===
2019–20 season
Date	Event	Level	SP	FS	Total
4–8 February 2020	2020 Russian Junior Championships	Junior	6; 66.11	4; 121.55	5; 187.66
24–29 December 2019	2020 Russian Championships	Senior	10; 64.69	6; 129.04	8; 193.73
2018–19 season
Date	Event	Level	SP	FS	Total
4–10 March 2019	2019 World Junior Championships	Junior	1; 68.31	3; 113.28	3; 181.59
1–4 February 2019	2019 Russian Junior Championships	Junior	3; 68.52	1; 127.40	2; 195.92
19–23 December 2018	2019 Russian Championships	Senior	9; 64.43	7; 124.90	8; 189.33
6–9 December 2018	2018–19 JGP Final	Junior	1; 66.84	2; 122.69	2; 189.53
26–29 September 2018	2018 JGP Czech Republic	Junior	1; 66.30	2; 114.58	2; 180.88
29 August – 1 September 2018	2018 JGP Austria	Junior	1; 60.83	1; 119.76	1; 180.59
2017–18 season
Date	Event	Level	SP	FS	Total
5–11 March 2018	2018 World Junior Championships	Junior	2; 61.77	3; 106.22	2; 167.99
23–26 January 2018	2018 Russian Junior Championships	Junior	11; 54.66	2; 121.71	3; 176.37
4–7 October 2017	2017 JGP Poland	Junior	4; 54.43	6; 92.02	6; 146.45
27–30 September 2017	2017 JGP Croatia	Junior	3; 59.68	1; 105.80	1; 165.48

World Junior Record Holders
Preceded by (Russia) Anastasia Mishina / Aleksandr Galiamov	Pairs' Junior Short Program; 27 September 2018 – 19 September 2019	Succeeded by (Russia) Apollinariia Panfilova / Dmitry Rylov
