= Apollinariia Panfilova =

Russian pair skater (born 2003)

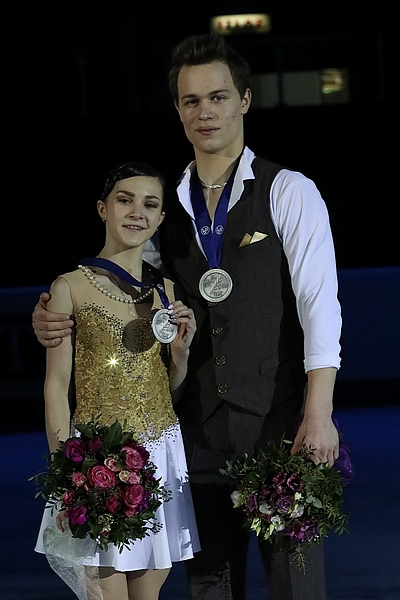
- Panfilova/Rylov at the 2019 World Junior Championships

Personal information
- Native name: Аполлинария Сергеевна Панфилова
- Full name: Apollinariia Sergeevna Panfilova
- Born: 23 January 2003 (age 23) Perm, Russia
- Home town: Perm, Russia
- Height: 1.53 m (5 ft 0 in)

Figure skating career
- Country: Russia
- Partner: Dmitry Rylov
- Coach: Pavel Sliusarenko, Valentina Tiukova
- Skating club: Perm Krai Sports Center
- Began skating: 2007
- Retired: January 5, 2023
Medal record
Representing Russia
Figure skating: Pairs
Winter Youth Olympics
Gold medal – first place	2020 Lausanne	Pairs
World Junior Championships
Gold medal – first place	2020 Tallinn	Pairs
Silver medal – second place	2019 Zagreb	Pairs
Junior Grand Prix Final
Gold medal – first place	2019–20 Torino	Pairs
Silver medal – second place	2017–18 Nagoya	Pairs
Bronze medal – third place	2018–19 Vancouver	Pairs

Apollinariia Sergeevna Panfilova (Russian: Аполлинария Сергеевна Панфилова, born 23 January 2003) is a retired Russian pair skater. With partner Dmitry Rylov, she is the 2020 World Junior champion, the 2020 Winter Youth Olympics champion, 2019–2020 Junior Grand Prix Final champion, 2019 World Junior silver medalist, the 2017–18 Junior Grand Prix Final silver medalist, and the 2018–19 Junior Grand Prix Final bronze medalist. Panfilova/Rylov are the current junior world record holders for both the short and free programs, and the total score for junior pairs.

== Career ==
=== Early years ===
Panfilova began learning to skate in 2007. She trained as a single skater in Perm.

Her first pair skating partner was Igor Samoilov, with whom she skated two seasons, 2012–2013 and 2013–2014. She then skated two seasons with Maksim Selkin, during 2014–2015 and 2015–2016.

Panfilova and Dmitry Rylov began competing together in 2016. They were coached by Valentina Tiukova and Pavel Sliusarenko at Perm Krai Sports Center in Perm.

=== 2017–18 season: Junior Grand Prix Final silver ===
Panfilova/Rylov made their international debut in early September 2017 at the Junior Grand Prix (JGP) competition in Riga where they won the gold medal. They beat the silver medalist, their teammates Boikova/Kozlovskii, by less than 4 points. They placed third at their second JGP assignment, in Minsk, Belarus. Their results qualified them for the 2017–18 JGP Final in Nagoya, Japan, where they won the silver medal after placing first in the short program and third in the free skate.

At the 2018 Russian Championships, they placed eighth on the senior level and seventh at the junior event.

=== 2018–19 season: Junior World silver ===
Panfilova/Rylov started their season by competing in the 2018 JGP series. At their first JGP event of the season they won the silver medal in Bratislava, Slovakia. They were ranked third in the short program and second in the free skate and they were part of a Russian sweep of the pairs' podium. Panfilova/Rylov were more than 11 points behind the gold medalists, Mishina/Galliamov but they beat the bronze medalists, Akhanteva/Kolesov, by a margin of only 0.13 points. At their second JGP event of the season they won another silver medal, now in Vancouver, Canada. Again they were beaten by Mishina/Galliamov. This time they were beaten by about 10 points. With two JGP silver medals they qualified for the 2018–19 Junior Grand Prix Final.

At the JGP Final Panfilova/Rylov won the bronze medal after placing second in the short program and third in the free skate. They were part of a Russian sweep of the pairs' podium. Panfilova/Rylov were about 4 points behind gold medalists Mishina/Galliamov and about 3 points behind the silver medalists, Kostiukovich/Ialin, who were separated by only 1.1 point.

At the 2019 Russian Championships, Panfilova/Rylov placed seventh at the senior level and third at the junior event.

At the 2019 World Junior Championships, Panfilova/Rylov placed second in the short program, despite a level 2 death spiral element. They came second in the free program as well, winning the silver medal with a score only 0.57 points behind the winners, Mishina/Galliamov. A downgraded Euler in their three-jump combination made the difference between silver and gold. Rylov described himself as "happy but also shocked", believing that they were likely to win bronze as in prior competitions.

=== 2019–20 season: Undefeated junior season ===
Panfilova/Rylov opened their third junior season at the 2019 JGP United States in Lake Placid, New York. They won the event by a 15-point margin over Russian teammates and silver medalists Akhanteva/Kolesov and set a new personal best in the short program (68.21), missing the junior world record held by Kostiukovich/Ialin by just 0.10 points.

At their second Junior Grand Prix assignment, 2019 JGP Poland held in Gdańsk, Panfilova/Rylov continued their success with another first-place finish. At this event, they broke the junior world records for both the short program (70.97) and the combined total score (192.73) by setting new personal bests in all three segments. The team finished more than 26 points ahead of American silver medalists Finster/Nagy. By winning both of their events and earning a perfect 30 total qualifying points, Panfilova/Rylov advanced to their third consecutive Junior Grand Prix Final as the top-seeded team.

At the 2019–20 Junior Grand Prix Final, Panfilova/Rylov placed first in the short program with a score of 68.80. However, despite being in the lead, the team was not entirely satisfied with their performance, which was plagued by minor errors. After the short, Panfilova stated, "It was a practice version of our program. We always want to do our very best when we go out, independently of the placement. Obviously, it is nice to be in first." In regards to coming into the event as the top-seeded team, Rylov further added, "I think it means more responsibility. Everyone looks at us more than at the others and sometimes that puts pressure on you and sometimes it is the opposite." Overall, the pair expressed confidence moving into the free. In the free skate, Panfilova/Rylov had a fall on their throw triple loop and doubled planned side-by-side triple salchows, causing them to fall behind fellow Russian competitors Mukhametzianova/Mironov in the free program standings. However, because of their lead after the short program, Panfilova/Rylov were able to hang onto their overall lead and capture their first Junior Grand Prix Final gold medal.

In late December 2019, Panfilova/Rylov competed at the senior level at the 2020 Russian Figure Skating Championships. Despite a strong showing in the short program which had the team in fifth place, after two falls by Panfilova in the free skate, the team fell to eighth in the free program and sixth overall; this nevertheless marks the team's highest placement in the event to date. Due to their finish, Panfilova/Rylov were named third alternates to the Russian team for the 2020 European Figure Skating Championships.

Panfilova/Rylov next competed at the 2020 Winter Youth Olympics in Lausanne, Switzerland in January 2020. In the short program, the team upgraded their junior world record score, earning 71.74 points which put them comfortably into the lead over trailing fellow Russian team Mukhametzianova/Mironov. In the free program, Panfilova/Rylov skated cleanly to set new junior-level world records for both the free program and the total score, surpassing the previous free program record held by Mishina/Galliamov and upgrading their own total score record by just under seven points. They topped the podium with a score of 199.21.

After winning the Russian junior title, Panfilova/Rylov finished the season at the 2020 World Junior Championships in Tallinn, Estonia. They won the short program with a new personal best and world junior record score of 73.71. Winning the free skate as well, they took their first Junior World title. Panfilova commented that it "was not our best performance, but we did what we could do. The preparation was not ideal, like basically throughout the season. Maybe it was for the better – the more difficult your preparation is, the more valuable is the medal." Panfilova/Rylov won every junior international event they entered in the season, losing only their country's senior nationals.

In an interview with Golden Skate on June 2, 2020, Apollinariia and Dmitry announced their plan to move to seniors for the 2020–21 season, as well as reinforced their commitment to including side-by-side triple jumps in their programs moving forward – a technical feat the team struggled to accomplish in juniors.

=== 2020–21 season: International senior debut ===
Panfilova/Rylov missed the senior Russian test skates and the early stages of the Cup of Russia series due to Rylov's undergoing a tonsillectomy. They made their Grand Prix debut at the 2020 Rostelecom Cup, where they placed third in the short program despite out-of-sync spins. They encountered more difficulties in the free skate, with Panfilova falling on an attempted triple Salchow while Rylov doubled his attempt at the same jump, but the team remained third in the segment to take the bronze medal overall.

At the 2021 Russian Championships, Panfilova/Rylov earned their best placement at the senior national championships to date, fifth overall in a field of seasoned senior competitors. The team ranked fourth after the short program, due in part to an uncharacteristic error from Mishina/Galliamov, but fell to fifth in the free skate and fifth overall after a series of errors, including Panfilova falling on a downgraded triple salchow, as well as other underrotation and step-out issues.

=== 2021–22 season: Recovery from injury ===
Panfilova/Rylov were excluded from the initial Grand Prix assignments for the 2021–22 season, despite meeting the requirements to receive two assignments, due to Rylov's extended recovery period from injury. They had not resumed training by July 2021. Pavel Sliusarenko, the team's coach, later gave an interview in September stating that Panfilova/Rylov likely would not compete during the season before April 2022 at the earliest, and that competing at the 2022 Russian Figure Skating Championships was out of the question due to Rylov's recovery timeline. He emphasized that the team remained committed to skating together, and that Rylov would likely return to training in October.

In December, Sliusarenko reported that Panfilova/Rylov had resumed skating together, but would not be able to compete during the season as it would require another three months for Rylov to be allowed to perform lifts and throws. The pair was further plagued by injury when Panfilova broke her foot over the summer of 2022.

=== Retirement from competition ===
Panfilova/Rylov announced their joint retirement from competitive figure skating on January 5, 2023. The decision to end their careers was made due to Rylov's 2021 injury, which required spinal surgery and the insertion of four titanium screws into his lower back, and Panfilova's 2022 foot injury.

== Programs ==
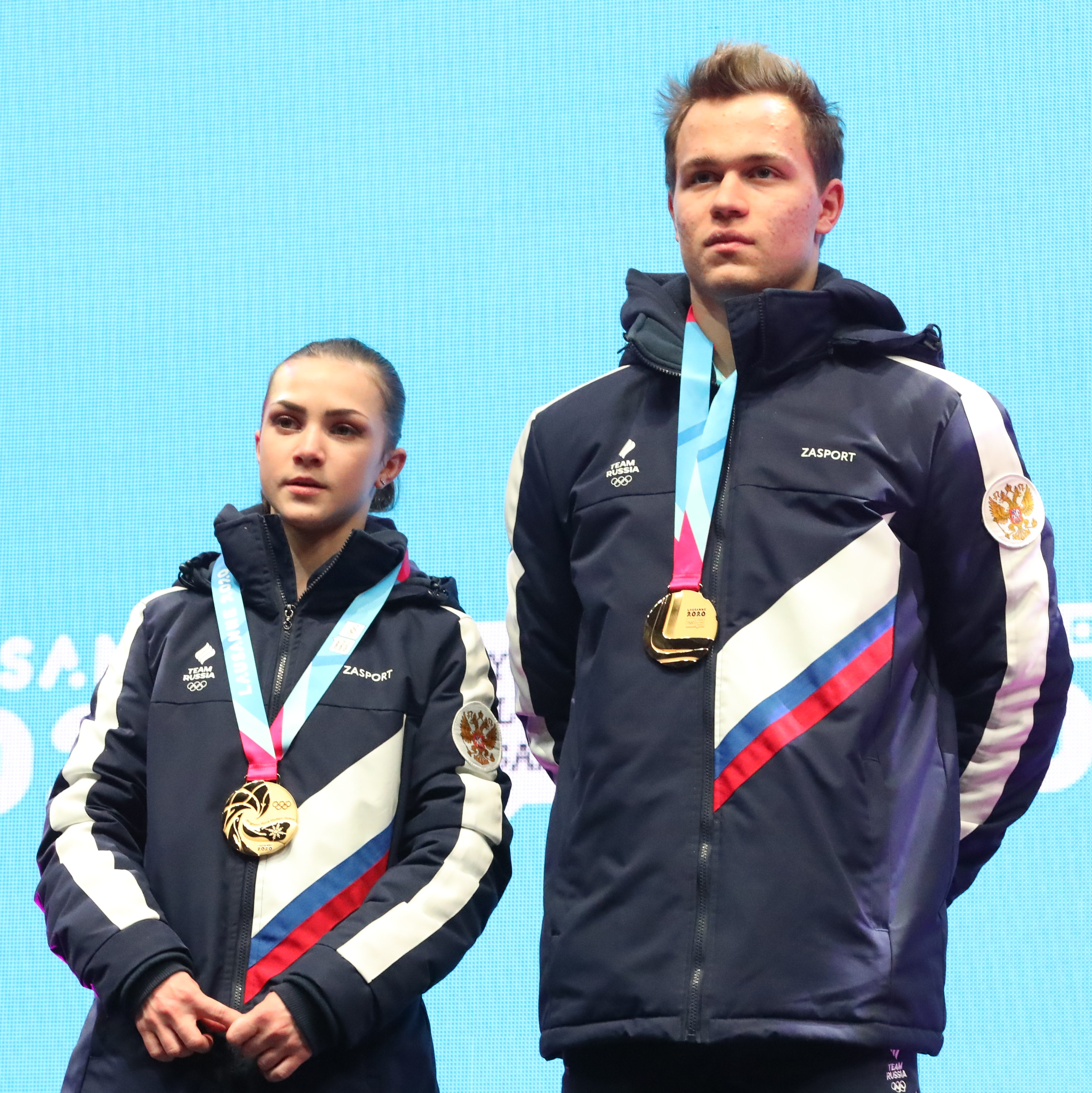
Panfilova / Rylov at the 2020 Youth Olympic Games

=== With Rylov ===
Season	Short program	Free skating	Exhibition
2020–2021	Bathroom Dance (from Joker) performed by Hildur Guðnadóttir; Rock and Roll, Part 2 by Gary Glitter; Joke's on You (from Birds of Prey) performed by Charlotte Lawrence	No One Ever Called Me That (from Third Person) by Dario Marianelli	Idontwannabeyouanymore by Billie Eilish
2019–2020	The Matrix: Clubbed to Death by Rob Dougan; Spybreak! by Propellerheads	No One Ever Called Me That (from Third Person) by Dario Marianelli	Idontwannabeyouanymore by Billie Eilish
2018–2019	I Put a Spell on You by Screamin' Jay Hawkins performed by Annie Lennox	Charms (from W.E.) by Abel Korzeniowski	
2017–2018	Black Velvet by Alannah Myles; Swingin' performed by LeAnn Rimes	Alice's Theme (from Alice in Wonderland) by Danny Elfman	

== Competitive highlights ==
GP: Grand Prix, JGP: Junior Grand Prix

=== With Rylov ===
International
Event	17–18	18–19	19–20	20–21
GP Rostelecom				3rd
International: Junior
Junior Worlds		2nd	1st	
Youth Olympics			1st	
JGP Final	2nd	3rd	1st	
JGP Belarus	3rd			
JGP Canada		2nd		
JGP Latvia	1st			
JGP Poland			1st	
JGP Slovakia		2nd		
JGP United States			1st	
Volvo Open Cup			1st	
National
Russian Champ.	8th	7th	6th	5th
Russian Jr. Champ.	7th	3rd	1st	
Russian Cup Final				WD
Team events^{1}
Youth Olympics			6th T	

== Detailed results ==
Small medals for short and free programs awarded only at ISU Championships.

With Rylov

Senior results

2020–21 season
Date	Event	Level	SP	FS	Total
23–27 December 2020	2021 Russian Championships	Senior	4; 74.51	5; 132.52	5; 207.03
20–22 November 2020	2020 Rostelecom Cup	Senior	3; 73.84	3; 136.23	3; 210.07

Junior results

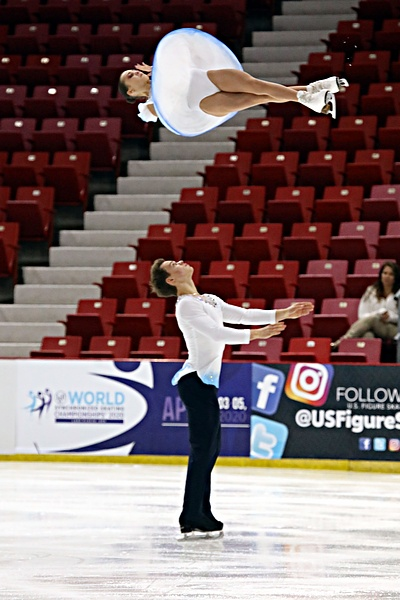
Panfilova / Rylov executing their triple twist at the 2019 JGP Lake Placid.

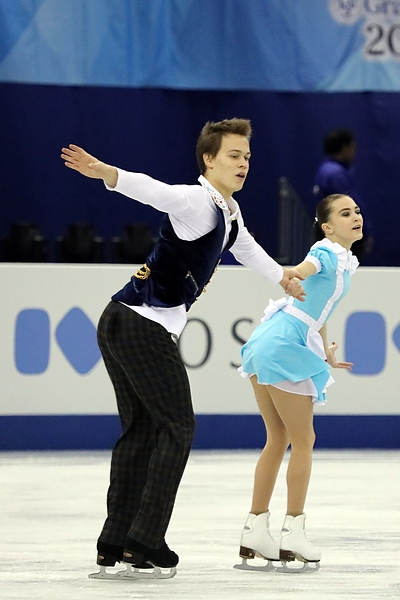
Panfilova / Rylov at the 2017–18 Junior Grand Prix Final.

2019–20 season
2–8 March 2020	2020 World Junior Championships	Junior	1; 73.71	1; 122.25	1; 195.96
4–8 February 2020	2020 Russian Junior Championships	Junior	1; 75.49	1; 131.98	1; 207.47
10–15 January 2020	2020 Winter Youth Olympics – Team	Junior	–	1; 126.49	6T
10–15 January 2020	2020 Winter Youth Olympics	Junior	1; 71.74	1; 127.47	1; 199.21
26–28 December 2019	2020 Russian Championships	Senior	5; 71.51	8; 126.30	6; 197.81
4–8 December 2019	2019–20 Junior Grand Prix Final	Junior	1; 68.80	2; 116.43	1; 185.23
5–10 November 2019	2019 Volvo Open Cup	Junior	1; 64.09	1; 118.06	1; 182.15
18–21 September 2019	2019 JGP Poland	Junior	1; 70.97	1; 121.76	1; 192.73
28–31 August 2019	2019 JGP United States	Junior	1; 68.21	1; 118.71	1; 186.92
2018–19 season
Date	Event	Level	SP	FS	Total
4–10 March 2019	2019 World Junior Championships	Junior	2; 67.91	2; 120.26	2; 188.17
1–4 February 2019	2019 Russian Junior Championships	Junior	2; 70.07	3; 124.83	3; 194.90
19–23 December 2018	2019 Russian Championships	Senior	8; 65.97	8; 124.75	7; 190.72
6–9 December 2018	2018–19 JGP Final	Junior	2; 66.44	3; 120.15	3; 186.59
12–15 September 2018	2018 JGP Canada	Junior	2; 63.92	2; 114.26	2; 178.18
22–25 August 2018	2018 JGP Slovakia	Junior	3; 57.95	2; 115.42	2; 173.37
2017–18 season
Date	Event	Level	SP	FS	Total
23–26 January 2018	2018 Russian Junior Championships	Junior	6; 59.27	7; 109.86	7; 169.13
21–24 December 2017	2018 Russian Championships	Senior	9; 62.64	8; 118.54	8; 181.18
7–10 December 2017	2017–18 JGP Final	Junior	1; 60.81	3; 112.20	2; 173.01
20–24 September 2017	2017 JGP Belarus	Junior	5; 52.58	3; 97.63	3; 150.21
6–9 September 2017	2017 JGP Latvia	Junior	2; 55.99	2; 101.52	1; 157.51
