= Cross-country skiing at the 2019 European Youth Olympic Winter Festival =

- Venue: Veliko polje, Igman
- Date: 11–15 February
- Website: eyof2019.net

Location in Bosnia and Herzegovina

Cross-country skiing at the 2019 European Youth Olympic Winter Festival was held from 11 to 15 February at Veliko polje, Igman, Bosnia and Herzegovina.

== Competition schedule ==
Date	Time	Event
11 February	10:00	Girls' 7.5 km classical
11 February	12:00	Boys' 10 km classical
12 February	10:00	Girls' 5 km freestyle
12 February	12:00	Boys' 7.5 km freestyle
14 February	10:30; 13:00	Girls' sprint
14 February	11:20; 13:00	Boys' sprint
15 February	10:30	Mixed 4 x 5 km relay
Source: All times are (UTC+1)

== Medal summary ==
=== Medal table ===
Rank	Nation	Gold	Silver	Bronze	Total
1	Norway (NOR)	3	1	1	5
2	Switzerland (SUI)	2	1	2	5
3	France (FRA)	1	1	1	3
4	Poland (POL)	1	0	1	2
5	Russia (RUS)	0	4	1	5
6	Germany (GER)	0	0	1	1
Totals (6 entries)		7	7	7	21

=== Boys' events ===
Event	Gold		Silver		Bronze	
10 km classical	Florian Perez; France	30:37.8	Julien Arnaud; France	30:55.9	Gaspard Rousset; France	32:26.8
7.5 km freestyle	Martin Kirkeberg Mørk; Norway	19:47.3	Edvard Sandvik; Norway	19:55.3	Cla-Ursin Nufer; Switzerland	20:00.3
Sprint	Andreas Bergsland; Norway	3:12.92	Artem Maximov; Russia	3:12.25	Sergey Volkov; Russia	3:08.31

=== Girls' events ===
Event	Gold		Silver		Bronze	
7.5 km classical	Anja Weber; Switzerland	25:22.5	Nadja Kälin; Switzerland	25:52.0	Monika Skinder; Poland	26:10.9
5 km freestyle	Anja Weber; Switzerland	14:51.5	Alena Baranova; Russia	15:02.9	Helen Hoffmann; Germany	15:04.3
Sprint	Monika Skinder; Poland	3:34.04	Alena Baranova; Russia	3:31.48	Sigrid Leseth Føyen; Norway	3:45.93

=== Team event ===
Event	Gold		Silver		Bronze	
Mixed 4 x 5 km relay	Norway (NOR); Lars Agnar Hjelmeset; Margrethe Bergane; Martin Kirkeberg Mørk; Ebba Andresen	1:02:01.4	Russia (RUS); Egor Lonchakov; Alena Baranova; Sergey Volkov; Ekaterina Meged	1:02:05.8	Switzerland (SUI); Nicola Wigger; Nadja Kälin; Cla-Ursin Nufer; Anja Weber	1:02:13.4
