= Ice hockey at the 2019 European Youth Olympic Winter Festival =

2019 European Youth Olympic Winter Festival

Tournament details
- Host country: Bosnia and Herzegovina
- Venue: 1 (in 1 host city)
- Dates: 11–14 February
- Teams: 6

Final positions
- Champions: Czech Republic (2nd title)
- Runners-up: Belarus
- Third place: Finland
- Fourth place: Russia

Tournament statistics
- Games played: 9
- Goals scored: 38 (4.22 per game)
- Scoring leader: (Czech Republic) Pavel Novák (3 points)

Location in Bosnia and Herzegovina

Ice hockey at the 2019 European Youth Olympic Winter Festival was held from 11 to 14 February at the Zetra Olympic Hall in Sarajevo, Bosnia and Herzegovina. Six countries participated in this event.

== Medal summary ==
=== Medal table ===
| Rank | Nation | Gold | Silver | Bronze | Total |
|---|---|---|---|---|---|
| 1 | Czech Republic (CZE) | 1 | 0 | 0 | 1 |
| 2 | Belarus (BLR) | 0 | 1 | 0 | 1 |
| 3 | Finland (FIN) | 0 | 0 | 1 | 1 |
| Totals (3 entries) | | 1 | 1 | 1 | 3 |

=== Medalists ===
| Event | Gold | Silver | Bronze |
|---|---|---|---|
| Boys | Czech Republic (CZE); Pavel Novák; Štěpán Macháček; Michal Simon; Michal Gut; Tobiáš Handl; Jakub Naar; Jan Cikhart; Tomáš Chlubna; Tomáš Perička; Jan Hampl; Ivan Ivan; Joshua James Mácha; Pavel Matěj; Jan Bednář; Jakub Malý; Marek Bláha; Pavel Čajan; Dominik Vacík; Daniel Malák; Ondřej Baláž | Belarus (BLR); Vitali Antanovich; Kiryl Buinich; Daniil Vermeichyk; Maksim Vaitovich; Valery Zhyhalau; Maksim Lemiasheuski; Uladzislau Zalesinski; Egor Kladiev; Nikita Mytnik; Illia Spat; Dzmitry Kuzmin; Aliaksandr Suvorau; Miraslau Mikhaliou; Nikita Parfianiuk; Vitali Pinchuk; Herman Pirahouski; Aleh Pazhyhan; Yahor Yuzlenka; Kiryl Yaruta; Mark Yaruta | Finland (FIN); Riku Uusikartano; Eetu Liukas; Veeti Korkalainen; Juuso Mäenpää; Juha Jatkola; Veikka Hahl; Brad Lambert; Eero Niemi; Jesse Seppälä; Joel Määttä; Joni Jurmo; Eemil Viro; Joona Lehmus; Topias Kaski; Christoffer Sedoff; Oskari Luoto; Ruben Rafkin; Max Väyrynen; Roby Järventie; Luka Nyman |

== Group stage ==
All times are local (UTC+1).

=== Group A ===
| Pos | Team | Pld | W | OTW | OTL | L | GF | GA | GD | Pts | Qualification |
|---|---|---|---|---|---|---|---|---|---|---|---|
| 1 | Belarus | 2 | 1 | 0 | 1 | 0 | 5 | 4 | +1 | 4 | Final |
| 2 | Finland | 2 | 1 | 0 | 0 | 1 | 4 | 5 | −1 | 3 | Bronze medal game |
| 3 | Slovakia | 2 | 0 | 1 | 0 | 1 | 3 | 3 | 0 | 2 | Fifth place game |

Source: https://eyof2019.net/ba/result.php

| 11 February 2019; 15:00 | Finland | 2–1 (2–0, 0–0, 0–1) | Slovakia | Zetra Olympic Hall |

Game reference

| Liukas (Määttä) – 09:01 | 1–0 |
| Korkalainen – 18:38 | 2–0 |
| | 2–1 | 54:02 – Petráš (Faith) (PP) |

10 min
Penalties
6 min

| 12 February 2019; 19:30 | Slovakia | 2–1 OT (1–0, 0–0, 0–1) (OT: 1–0) | Belarus | Zetra Olympic Hall |

Game reference

| Faith (SH) – 02:33 | 1–0 |
| | 1–1 | 48:55 – M. Yaruta (Pirahouski) |
| Kašlík – 61:01 | 2–1 |

10 min
Penalties
8 min

| 13 February 2019; 15:00 | Belarus | 4–2 (2–1, 0–0, 2–1) | Finland | Zetra Olympic Hall |

Game reference

| | 0–1 | 02:12 – Lambert (Rafkin, Seppälä) (PP) |
| Sapelnikau (SH) – 03:46 | 1–1 |
| Klavdiev (Pazhyhan) – 17:53 | 2–1 |
| | 2–2 | 47:07 – Lambert (Järventie, Seppälä) |
| Pirahouski (Mikhaliou, M. Yaruta) – 58:07 | 3–2 |
| Pinchuk (K. Yaruta) – 59:15 | 4–2 |

=== Group B ===
| Pos | Team | Pld | W | OTW | OTL | L | GF | GA | GD | Pts | Qualification |
|---|---|---|---|---|---|---|---|---|---|---|---|
| 1 | Czech Republic | 2 | 2 | 0 | 0 | 0 | 5 | 1 | +4 | 6 | Final |
| 2 | Russia | 2 | 1 | 0 | 0 | 1 | 8 | 3 | +5 | 3 | Bronze medal game |
| 3 | Switzerland | 2 | 0 | 0 | 0 | 2 | 1 | 10 | −9 | 0 | Fifth place game |

Source: https://eyof2019.net/ba/result.php

| 11 February 2019; 19:30 | Czech Republic | 2–1 (1–0, 0–1, 1–0) | Russia | Zetra Olympic Hall; Attendance: 1,260 |

Game reference

Jan Bednář
Goalies
Semyon Sharabarin

| Handl (Bednář) (PP) – 19:20 | 1–0 |
| | 1–1 | 29:48 – Didkovskiy (Pashin) |
| Cikhart (Malák, Simon) – 50:30 | 2–1 |

8 min
Penalties
16 min
26
Shots
33

| 12 February 2019; 15:00 | Russia | 7–1 (2–1, 3–0, 2–0) | Switzerland | Zetra Olympic Hall |

Game reference

Semyon Sharabarin
Goalies
Lucas Rötheli

| | 0–1 | 05:32 – Robin |
| Khristanov – 09:36 | 1–1 |
| Khusnutdinov (Buruianov) (SH) – 15:33 | 2–1 |
| Pashin (Kokhanin) – 26:09 | 3–1 |
| Didkovskiy (Zlodeev) (SH) – 31:36 | 4–1 |
| Ponomarev (Kosolapov) (PP) – 36:39 | 5–1 |
| Kokhanin (Mukhamadullin, Pashin) – 43:58 | 6–1 |
| Khusnutdinov (Rychkov) – 46:24 | 7–1 |

8 min
Penalties
6 min

| 13 February 2019; 19:30 | Switzerland | 0–3 (0–1, 0–2, 0–0) | Czech Republic | Zetra Olympic Hall |

Game reference

| 0–1 | 19:06 – Novák (Chlubna) |
| 0–2 | 30:10 – Novák (Baláž) (PP) |
| 0–3 | 36:01 – Chlubna |

== Final round ==
=== Fifth place game ===
| 14 February 2019; 12:00 | Slovakia | 4–1 (1–0, 2–1, 1–0) | Switzerland | Zetra Olympic Hall |

Game reference

| Stacha (Myklukha) – 10:54 | 1–0 |
| Jombík (Fatul) – 21:14 | 2–0 |
| Kašlík (Jamrich, Putala) (PP) – 34:41 | 3–0 |
| | 3–1 | 37:05 – Biasca |
| Ragan (Petráš, Myklukha) – 59:02 | 4–1 |

=== Bronze medal game ===
| 14 February 2019; 16:00 | (bronze) Finland | 3–1 (2–1, 1–0, 0–0) | Russia | Zetra Olympic Hall |

Game reference

Max Väyrynen
Goalies
Bogdan Nefedov
Semyon Sharabarin

| Liukas (Määttä, Järventie) – 03:26 | 1–0 |
| Järventie (Maenpaa, Liukas) – 13:50 | 2–0 |
| | 2–1 | 16:47 – Rychkov (Vashchilin, Tiutnev) |
| Myllyaho (Uusikartano, Viro) – 25:20 | 3–1 |

4 min
Penalties
8 min

=== Final ===
| 14 February 2019; 20:00 | (gold) Czech Republic | 3–1 (0–0, 0–1, 3–0) | Belarus (silver) | Zetra Olympic Hall |

Game reference

| | 0–1 | 23:43 – Herasimau (Pinchuk, Antanovich) |
| Handl (Cikhart) – 41:44 | 1–1 |
| Matej (Blaha) – 55:48 | 2–1 |
| Novák (PP) – 58:41 | 3–1 |

14 min
Penalties
14 min
