= Ilya Yablokov =

Russian figure skater

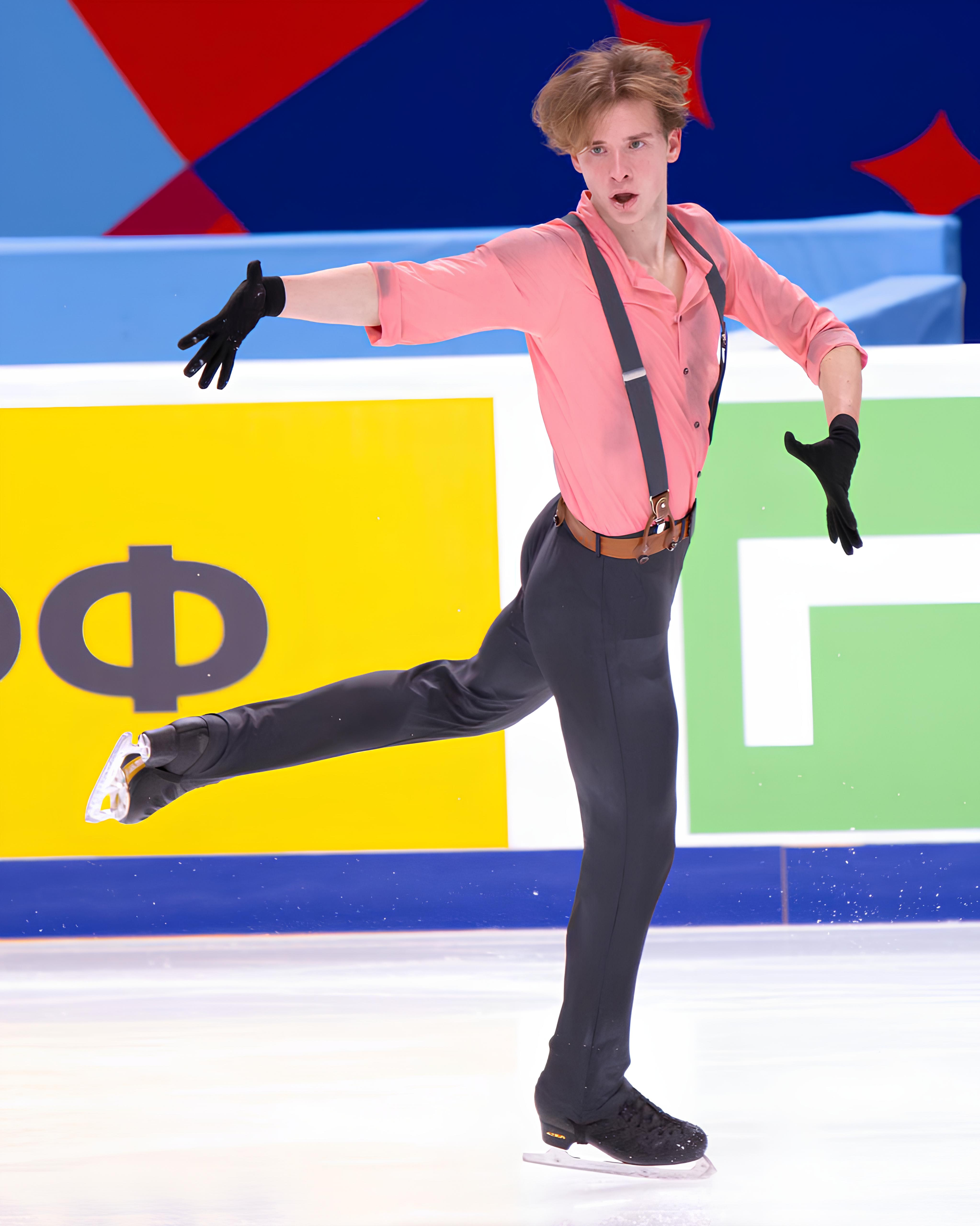
- Yablokov at the 2024 Russian Figure Skating Championships

Personal information
- Native name: Илья Олегович Яблоков (Russian)
- Full name: Ilya Olegovich Yablokov
- Other names: Ilia
- Born: 29 September 2003 (age 22) Saint Petersburg, Russia
- Height: 1.73 m (5 ft 8 in)

Figure skating career
- Country: Russia
- Coach: Viktoria Butsaeva
- Skating club: Olympic School "Moskvich"
- Began skating: 2007

Ilya Olegovich Yablokov (Russian: Илья Олегович Яблоков; born 29 September 2003) is a Russian figure skater. He is the 2019 European Youth Olympic Festival champion and a three-time Junior Grand Prix medalist, including gold at 2021 JGP Slovenia. He finished in the top ten at the 2020 World Junior Championships.

== Personal life ==
Yablokov was born on 29 September 2003 in Saint Petersburg. As of 2020, he is a high school student.

== Career ==
Yablokov began skating in 2007. He initially trained under Nadezhda Kondulinskaya and Alexander Shubin in Moscow, before later switching to Viktoria Butsaeva.

On the junior level internationally, Yablokov is the 2018 Christmas Cup, the 2019 Cup of Tyrol, and the 2019 European Youth Olympic Festival champion. Earlier, he won silver at the 2017 Cup of Tyrol. At the Russian Junior Championships, Yablokov placed 14th in 2018 and 10th in 2019.

=== 2019–2020 season ===
Yablokov received his first Junior Grand Prix assignments. At his first event, JGP Russia, he won bronze behind teammates Petr Gumennik and Artur Danielian as part of a Russian podium sweep. Yablokov was fourth at his second event in Italy, missing the podium by around eight points. As a result of his placements and by virtue of a tiebreaker, he was third alternate for the 2019–20 Junior Grand Prix Final.

Yablokov finished 11th at the 2020 Russian Championships in December after replacing Mikhail Kolyada, who was recovering from sinusitis. He sixth at the 2020 Russian Junior Championships in February and was subsequently named first alternate for the 2020 World Junior Championships team. Yablokov won senior bronze behind Makar Ignatov and Anton Shulepov at the Russian Cup Final at the end of February.

Yablokov was called up to replace Daniil Samsonov on the Junior Worlds team after Samsonov withdrew due to health issues. At the World Junior Championships, he was seventh after the short program but tenth in the free skating to finish tenth overall. Afterwards, Yablokov expressed that he was "extremely dissatisfied" with his performance at the event.

=== 2020–2021 season ===
Yablokov spent part of the offseason at a national team training camp in Sirius. He fell ill with a sore throat three weeks before Russian test skates and contracted a rotavirus infection upon arriving in Novogorsk for the test skates. Yablokov's coach, Viktoria Butsaeva cited his illnesses as part of their struggles to prepare adequately for the season but noted his junior bronze medal at the Moscow Championships in September was a turning point.

Due to the COVID-19 pandemic, the Junior Grand Prix, where Yablokov would have competed, was cancelled. However, after the Grand Prix series was converted into semi-domestic events, he was able to replace Alexander Samarin at 2020 Rostelecom Cup as the latter was still recovering from a back injury. At Rostelecom Cup, Yablokov was tenth in the short program and ninth in the free skating to finish ninth overall.

At the 2021 Russian Championships in December, Yablokov struggled with mistakes in both programs, finishing in 13th place. He reflected after the short program that he was "not very happy with [himself]," noting that he could usually perform the elements "well and consistently." Yablokov then competed at the 2021 Russian Junior Championships in February, finishing second in the short program, but made mistakes in the free skating to place sixth in the segment. He appeared to have won the bronze medal but fell to fourth after judges realized that competitor Egor Rukhin's quadruple Salchow was miscalled as a triple; Rukhin's score with the adjusted base value placed him about 1.5 points above Yablokov.

=== 2021–2022 season ===
With the resumption of international junior competition, Yablokov returned to the Junior Grand Prix at the 2021 JGP Slovakia, winning the silver medal. He went on to win a gold medal at the 2021 JGP Slovenia, qualifying for the 2021–22 Junior Grand Prix Final, but the latter event was cancelled as a result of concerns prompted by the Omicron variant. He was fifteenth at the 2021 CS Warsaw Cup at the senior level.

At the 2022 Russian Championships, Yablokov finished in fourteenth place.

== Programs ==
Season	Short program	Free skating
2022-2024	The Ecstasy of Gold (from The Good, The Bad, and the Ugly) by Ennio Morricone performed by Il Volo	Stayin' Alive by The Bee Gees; Ain't No Sunshine by Bill Withers performed by Tom Jones; Shout by The Isley Brothers
2021–2022	Born to Play Reprise; I Need You by Jon Batiste choreo. by Nikita Mikhailov	Walk Away by Xavier Mortimer & Maxime Rodriguez; Funny (from City of Angels) by Nadim Naaman choreo. by Nikita Mikhailov
2020–2021	Moonlight Sonata (modern arrangement) by Ludwig van Beethoven	Walk Away by Xavier Mortimer & Maxime Rodriguez; Funny (from City of Angels) by Nadim Naaman choreo. by Nikita Mikhailov; Notre-Dame de Paris by Riccardo Cocciante choreo. by Nikita Mikhailov
2019–2020	Tick Tock Goes the Clock by Jo Blankenburg choreo. by Nikita Mikhailov	Notre-Dame de Paris by Riccardo Cocciante choreo. by Nikita Mikhailov
2018–2019	Sarabande Suite by Globus choreo. by Nikita Mikhailov	Shake a Tail Feather (from The Blues Brothers) by The Five Du-Tones performed by Ray Charles choreo. by Nikita Mikhailov

== Competitive highlights ==
GP: Grand Prix; CS: Challenger Series; JGP: Junior Grand Prix

International
Event	16–17	17–18	18–19	19–20	20–21	21–22	22–23	23–24
GP Rostelecom Cup					9th			
CS Warsaw Cup						15th		
International: Junior
Junior Worlds				10th				
JGP Final						C		
JGP Italy				4th				
JGP Russia				3rd				
JGP Slovakia						2nd		
JGP Slovenia						1st		
EYOF			1st					
Christmas Cup			1st					
Cup of Tyrol	2nd		1st					
National
Russian Champ.				11th	14th	14th	11th	9th
Russian Junior		14th	10th	6th	4th	1st		

== Detailed results ==
ISU Personal best in bold.

=== Senior results ===
**2021–22 season**
Date	Event	SP	FS	Total
December 21–26, 2021	2022 Russian Championships	13; 85.40	13; 158.31	14; 243.71
November 17–20, 2021	2021 CS Warsaw Cup	9; 76.41	20; 121.91	15; 198.32
**2020–21 season**
Date	Event	SP	FS	Total
December 23–27, 2020	2021 Russian Championships	13; 77.38	14; 136.77	14; 214.15
November 20–22, 2020	2020 Rostelecom Cup	10; 79.15	9; 163.37	9; 242.52
**2019–20 season**
Date	Event	SP	FS	Total
December 24–28, 2019	2020 Russian Championships	12; 75.86	11; 147.95	11; 223.81

=== Junior results ===
**2021–22 season**
Date	Event	SP	FS	Total
18–22 January 2022	2022 Russian Junior Championships	3; 83.22	4; 144.77	1; 227.99
September 22–25, 2021	2021 JGP Slovenia	1; 78.89	1; 153.10	1; 231.99
September 1–4, 2021	2021 JGP Slovakia	2; 73.25	2; 134.14	2; 207.39
**2020–21 season**
Date	Event	SP	FS	Total
February 1–5, 2021	2021 Russian Junior Championships	2; 85.38	6; 148.86	4; 234.24
**2019–20 season**
Date	Event	SP	FS	Total
March 2–8, 2020	2020 World Junior Championships	7; **77.53**	10; 128.63	10; 206.16
February 4–8, 2020	2020 Russian Junior Championships	4; 81.62	6; 144.48	6; 226.10
October 2–5, 2019	2019 JGP Italy	5; 70.39	4; **143.01**	4; **213.40**
September 11–14, 2019	2019 JGP Russia	3; 73.73	3; 133.95	3; 207.68
**2018–19 season**
Date	Event	SP	FS	Total
March 2–3, 2019	2019 Cup of Tyrol	1; 78.04	1; 138.60	1; 216.64
February 13–14, 2019	2019 European Youth Olympic Festival	1; 74.76	1; 136.86	1; 211.62
Jan. 31 – Feb. 4, 2019	2019 Russian Junior Championships	12; 75.38	10; 139.32	10; 214.70
Nov. 29 – Dec. 1, 2018	2018 Christmas Cup	1; 69.92	1; 120.43	1; 190.35
**2017–18 season**
Date	Event	SP	FS	Total
January 23–26, 2018	2018 Russian Junior Championships	13; 69.99	17; 125.29	14; 195.28
**2016–17 season**
Date	Event	SP	FS	Total
Feb. 28 – Mar. 5, 2017	2017 Cup of Tyrol	1; 63.17	2; 116.60	2; 179.77
