= 2021 Nordic Junior World Ski Championships =

International skiing competition

- Location: Vuokatti and Lahti, Finland
- Dates: 9–14 February

The 2021 Nordic Junior World Ski Championships were held from 9 to 14 February 2021 in Vuokatti and Lahti, Finland.

== Schedule ==
All times are local (UTC+2).

Cross-country

Date	Time	Event
9 February	10:00	Men's junior sprint classical Women's junior sprint classical
11 February	12:00	Men's U23 sprint classical Women's U23 sprint classical
12 February	10:00	Women's junior 5 km freestyle
12 February	11:20	Men's junior 10 km freestyle
12 February	13:15	Women's U23 10 km freestyle
12 February	14:30	Men's U23 15 km freestyle
13 February	09:30	Women's junior 4 × 3.3 km relay
13 February	11:00	Men's junior 4 × 5 km relay
13 February	13:00	Mixed U23 4 × 5 km relay
14 February	10:40	Women's junior 15 km mass start classical
14 February	12:40	Men's junior 30 km mass start classical

Nordic combined

Date	Time	Event
10 February	13:00; 16:00	Women's HS100 / 5 km
11 February	13:00; 16:00	Men's HS100 / 10 km
12 February	10:30; 13:00	Mixed team HS100 / 5+2.5+2.5+5 km

Ski jumping

Date	Time	Event
11 February	09:50	Women's HS100
11 February	18:00	Men's HS100
12 February	16:43	Men's team HS100
12 February	19:05	Women's team HS100

== Medal summary ==
=== Junior events ===
==== Cross-country skiing ====
Event	Gold		Silver		Bronze	
Men's Junior Events
Sprint classical	Niilo Moilanen; Finland	3:08.85	Lars Agnar Hjelmeset; Norway	3:10.53	Emil Danielsson; Sweden	3:11.13
10 kilometre freestyle	Martin Kirkeberg Mørk; Norway	24:26.6	Alexander Ståhlberg; Finland	24:41.5	Olivier Léveillé; Canada	24:53.9
30 kilometre mass start classical	Alexander Ivshin; Russia	1:21:22.2	Jan-Friedrich Doerks; Germany	1:21.24.8	Alexander Ståhlberg; Finland	1:21:27.8
4 × 5 kilometre relay	Norway Edvard Sandvik; Jonas Vika; Martin Kirkeberg Mørk; Lars Agnar Hjelmeset	49:45.3	Finland Niilo Moilanen; Niko Anttola; Eemil Helander; Alexander Ståhlberg	50:05.3	Italy Fabio Longo; Alessandro Chiocchetti; Luca Sclisizzo; Elia Barp	50:07.9
Women's Junior Events
Sprint classical	Monika Skinder; Poland	2:33.24	Moa Hansson; Sweden	2:33.95	Karolina Kaleta; Poland	2:33.97
5 kilometre freestyle	Veronika Stepanova; Russia	13:44.3	Evgeniya Krupitskaya; Russia	14:00.8	Margrethe Bergane; Norway	14:11.7
15 kilometre mass start classical	Margrethe Bergane; Norway	45:37.7	Lisa Eriksson; Sweden	46:02.1	Helen Hoffmann; Germany	46:03.3
4 × 3.3 kilometre relay	Sweden Märta Rosenberg; Lisa Eriksson; Lisa Ingesson; Moa Hansson	37:50.5	Russia Anna Kozhinova; Evgeniya Krupitskaya; Olga Zholudeva; Veronika Stepanova	37:50.8	Norway Maria Hartz Melling; Emma Kirkeberg Mørk; Anna Heggen; Margrethe Bergane	38:16.9

==== Nordic combined ====
Event	Gold		Silver		Bronze	
Men's Junior Events
Individual normal hill/10 km	Johannes Lamparter; Austria	26:24.3	Mattéo Baud; France	27:13.7	Stefan Rettenegger; Austria	27:20.2
Women's Junior Events
Individual normal hill/5 km	Gyda Westvold Hansen; Norway	15:24.8	Marte Leinan Lund; Norway	16:30.5	Lisa Hirner; Austria	16:33.8
Mixed Junior Events
Team normal hill/5+2.5+2.5+5 km	Norway Eidar Johan Strøm; Marte Leinan Lund; Gyda Westvold Hansen; Andreas Skoglund	41:29.1	Austria Manuel Einkemmer; Lisa Hirner; Sigrun Kleinrath; Stefan Rettenegger	41:33.1	Italy Iacopo Bortolas; Annika Sieff; Daniela Dejori; Domenico Mariotti	42:21.1

==== Ski jumping ====
Event	Gold		Silver		Bronze	
Men's Junior Events
Individual normal hill	Niklas Bachlinger; Austria	263.9	David Haagen; Austria	263.3	Dominik Peter; Switzerland	261.5
Team normal hill	Austria David Haagen; Daniel Tschofenig; Elias Medwed; Niklas Bachlinger	986.2	Slovenia Žak Mogel; Jan Bombek; Rok Masle; Jernej Presečnik	914.7	Russia Ilya Mankov; Maksim Kolobov; Danil Sadreev; Mikhail Purtov	903.1
Women's Junior Events
Individual normal hill	Thea Minyan Bjørseth; Norway	239.0	Joséphine Pagnier; France	218.5	Jerneja Brecl; Slovenia	213.0
Team normal hill	Austria Hannah Wiegele; Vanessa Moharitsch; Julia Mühlbacher; Lisa Eder	883.6	Russia Anna Shpyneva; Aleksandra Barantceva; Anastasiia Subbotina; Irma Makhinia	828.7	Slovenia Nika Prevc; Nika Vetrih; Jerneja Repinc Zupančič; Jerneja Brecl	818.0

=== Under-23 events ===
==== Cross-country skiing ====
Event	Gold		Silver		Bronze	
Men's Under-23 Events
Sprint classical	Alexander Terentyev; Russia	3:01.72	Aron Åkre Rysstad; Norway	3:07.26	Sergey Ardashev; Russia	3:09.42
15 kilometre freestyle	Hugo Lapalus; France	35:27.6	Friedrich Moch; Germany	35:41.4	Iver Tildheim Andersen; Norway	35:46.3
Women's Under-23 Events
Sprint classical	Lisa Lohmann; Germany	2:38.07	Hristina Matsokina; Russia	2:38.53	Louise Lindström; Sweden	2:39.73
10 kilometre freestyle	Izabela Marcisz; Poland	28:13.6	Louise Lindström; Sweden	28:24.8	Hedda Østberg Amundsen; Norway	28:33.2
Mixed Under-23 Events
4 × 5 kilometre relay	Norway Synne Arnesen; Jon Rolf Skamo Hope; Håvard Moseby; Hedda Østberg Amundsen	52:52.9	Russia Anastasiya Faleeva; Sergey Ardashev; Alexander Terentyev; Anna Grukhvina	52:56.8	Sweden Hanna Abrahamasson; Fredrik Andersson; Johan Herbert; Louise Lindström	53:00.6

=== Medal tables ===
==== All events ====
* Host nation (Finland)

Rank	Nation	Gold	Silver	Bronze	Total
1	Norway	7	3	4	14
2	Austria	4	2	2	8
3	Russia	3	5	2	10
4	Poland	2	0	1	3
5	Sweden	1	3	3	7
6	Finland*	1	2	1	4
6	Germany	1	2	1	4
8	France	1	2	0	3
9	Slovenia	0	1	2	3
10	Italy	0	0	2	2
11	Canada	0	0	1	1
11	Switzerland	0	0	1	1
Totals (12 entries)		20	20	20	60

==== Junior events ====
* Host nation (Finland)

Rank	Nation	Gold	Silver	Bronze	Total
1	Norway	6	2	2	10
2	Austria	4	2	2	8
3	Russia	2	3	1	6
4	Finland*	1	2	1	4
4	Sweden	1	2	1	4
6	Poland	1	0	1	2
7	France	0	2	0	2
8	Slovenia	0	1	2	3
9	Germany	0	1	1	2
10	Italy	0	0	2	2
11	Canada	0	0	1	1
11	Switzerland	0	0	1	1
Totals (12 entries)		15	15	15	45

==== Under-23 events ====
Rank	Nation	Gold	Silver	Bronze	Total
1	Russia	1	2	1	4
2	Norway	1	1	2	4
3	Germany	1	1	0	2
4	France	1	0	0	1
4	Poland	1	0	0	1
6	Sweden	0	1	2	3
Totals (6 entries)		5	5	5	15
