= 2022 IBU Junior Open European Championships =

- Host city: Pokljuka, Slovenia
- Dates: 19–23 January
- Events: 8

The 7th IBU Junior Open European Championships were held from 19 to 23 January 2022 in Pokljuka, Slovenia.

== Schedule ==
All times are local (UTC+1).

Date	Time	Event
19 January	10:30	Women's 12.5 km individual
19 January	14:00	Men's 15 km individual
20 January	10:30	6 km W + 7.5 km M single mixed relay
20 January	14:00	4 × 6 km M+W mixed relay
22 January	10:30	Women's 7.5 km sprint
22 January	14:00	Men's 10 km sprint
23 January	10:30	Women's 10 km pursuit
23 January	14:00	Men's 12.5 km pursuit

== Medal summary ==
=== Medal table ===
Rank	Nation	Gold	Silver	Bronze	Total
1	France	3	3	2	8
2	Germany	3	1	1	5
3	Czech Republic	1	0	1	2
4	Bulgaria	1	0	0	1
5	Finland	0	2	1	3
6	Italy	0	1	1	2
6	Russia	0	1	1	2
8	Poland	0	0	1	1
Totals (8 entries)		8	8	8	24

=== Men ===
Event	Gold		Silver		Bronze	
15 km individual details	Blagoy Todev; Bulgaria	40:41.2 (0+0+0+1)	Nicolò Betemps; Italy	41:01.6 (0+0+0+1)	Gaëtan Paturel; France	41:10.3 (0+1+0+0)
10 km sprint details	Jonáš Mareček; Czech Republic	27:06.5 (1+1)	Otto Invenius; Finland	27:15.3 (1+0)	Iacopo Leonesio; Italy	27:15.8 (0+0)
12.5 km pursuit details	Paul Fontaine; France	34:28.3 (0+0+0+0)	Otto Invenius; Finland	35:04.5 (1+1+2+0)	Jan Guńka; Poland	35:17.0 (0+1+0+1)

=== Women ===
Event	Gold		Silver		Bronze	
12.5 km individual details	Camille Coupé; France	39:42.0 (0+0+0+0)	Jeanne Richard; France	39:46.6 (0+0+0+0)	Anastasiia Grishina; Russia	39:46.8 (0+0+0+0)
7.5 km sprint details	Selina Grotian; Germany	22:40.7 (0+1)	Chloé Bened; France	23:21.4 (1+0)	Noora Kaisa Keränen; Finland	23:22.0 (0+0)
10 km pursuit details	Selina Grotian; Germany	33:45.5 (0+2+0+0)	Jeanne Richard; France	34:11.0 (0+0+1+1)	Lisa Maria Spark; Germany	34:20.0 (0+0+0+1)

=== Mixed ===
Event	Gold		Silver		Bronze	
6 km W + 7.5 km M single relay details	Germany Johanna Puff; Darius Lodl	40:22.0 (0+0) (0+0) (0+2) (0+0) (0+0) (0+0) (0+1) (0+1)	Russia Anastasiia Grishina; Evgenii Emerkhonov	40:34.5 (0+0) (0+1) (0+2) (0+3) (0+1) (0+1) (0+3) (0+0)	France Fany Bertrand; Paul Fontaine	40:40.8 (0+0) (0+1) (0+1) (0+0) (0+0) (0+0) (0+1) (0+3)
4 × 6 km M+W relay details	France Camille Coupé; Jeanne Richard; Damien Levet; Jacques Jefferies	1:10:36.6 (0+0) (0+1) (0+0) (0+0) (0+0) (0+0) (0+1) (0+1)	Germany Selina Marie Kastl; Luise Müller; Benjamin Menz; Albert Engelmann	1:11:23.7 (0+0) (0+0) (0+0) (0+1) (0+0) (0+1) (0+0) (0+0)	Czech Republic Gabriela Masaříková; Tereza Jandová; Ondřej Mánek; Jonáš Mareček	1:11:35.9 (0+0) (0+0) (0+2) (0+1) (0+0) (0+1) (0+1) (0+2)
