= Lea Meier =

Swiss biathlete (born 2001)

Personal information
- Nationality: Swiss
- Born: 2 March 2001 (age 25) Schiers, Switzerland

Sport
- Country: Switzerland
- Sport: Biathlon
Medal record
Women's biathlon
Representing Switzerland
Youth World Championships
Gold medal – first place	2020 Lenzerheide	10 km individual

Lea Meier (born 2 March 2001) is a Swiss biathlete. She made her debut at the Biathlon World Cup in 2022.

== Career ==
Lea Meier began her biathlon career in 2014 after practicing cross-country skiing for two years. She made her international debut in December 2018, competing in her first events in the IBU Junior Cup. In February of the following year, she won two silver medals at the Youth Olympic Festival in Sarajevo. During the 2019/20 season, the Swiss athlete achieved significant success, including a podium finish and two victories with the mixed relay team in the Junior Cup. Her greatest triumph came with a gold medal in the individual event at the Youth World Championships held in Lenzerheide, her home country.

At the start of the 2020/21 winter season, Meier transitioned to the IBU Cup and participated in the European Championships in Duszniki-Zdrój, Poland. Over the season, she consistently placed in the points rankings, highlighted by a 14th-place finish in the sprint in Obertilliach. At the 2021 Junior World Championships, she finished fifth in the sprint. The following winter, she narrowly missed the podium in Obertilliach, competing with Elisa Gasparin, Jeremy Finello, and Joscha Burkhalter in a mixed relay, and achieved her best individual IBU Cup result to date with a 7th place. This led to her World Cup debut in the sprint race in Oberhof, where, despite a shooting miss, she placed 67th. At the season-ending Junior World Championships in Soldier Hollow, Meier secured another fifth-place finish in the pursuit.

At the start of the 2022/23 season, Meier became a regular member of the World Cup team. In the season opener in Kontiolahti, she finished 58th in the individual race and qualified for her first pursuit race at the highest level. In the following World Cup in Hochfilzen, she participated in her first relay event alongside Elisa and Aita Gasparin and Lena Häcki-Groß, finishing sixth. At Pokljuka in early 2023, Meier earned her first World Cup points with a 32nd place in the sprint and a 24th place in the subsequent pursuit. She participated in another relay in Antholz, where her team finished seventh.

== Biathlon results ==
All results are sourced from the International Biathlon Union.

=== Olympic Games ===
0 medal

Event	Individual	Sprint	Pursuit	Mass start	Relay	Mixed relay
(Italy) 2026 Milano Cortina	7th	13th	24th	24th	8th	10th

=== World Cup ===
Season	Age	Overall			Individual		Sprint		Pursuit		Mass start	
Season	Age	Races	Points	Position	Points	Position	Points	Position	Points	Position	Points	Position
2021–22	21	1/22	Did not earn World Cup points									
2022–23	22	9/20	26	69th	—	—	9	67th	17	54th	—	—
2023–24	23	12/21	13	81st	—	—	11	70th	2	77th	—	—
2024–25	24	7/21	24	73rd	19	47th	5	78th	—	—	—	—

=== Youth and Junior World Championships ===
Year	Age	Individual	Sprint	Pursuit	Relay
(Switzerland) 2020 Lenzerheide	18	Gold	10th	14th	9th
(Austria) 2021 Obertilliach	19	17th	5th	16th	7th
(United States) 2022 Soldier Hollow	20	23rd	8th	5th	7th
(Kazakhstan) 2023 Shchuchinsk	21	11th	28th	29th	11th
