= Snowboarding at the 2019 European Youth Olympic Winter Festival =

- Venue: Bjelašnica
- Date: 11–14 February
- Website: eyof2019.net

Location in Bosnia and Herzegovina

Snowboarding at the 2019 European Youth Olympic Winter Festival was held from 11 to 14 February at Bjelašnica, Bosnia and Herzegovina.

== Competition schedule ==
Sessions that included the event finals are shown in bold.

Date	Time	Event
11 February	10:00	Boys' slopestyle
12 February	09:30; 12:30	**Boys' slopestyle**
12 February	10:50; 12:30	**Girls' slopesytle**
14 February	09:30; 13:00	**Boys' big air**
14 February	11:00; 13:00	**Girls' big air**
Source: All times are (UTC+1)

Notes

- Girls' slopestyle qualifications were postponed (weather conditions) from 11 to 12 February.

== Medal summary ==
=== Medal table ===
Rank	Nation	Gold	Silver	Bronze	Total
1	Switzerland (SUI)	3	1	0	4
2	Germany (GER)	1	0	0	1
3	Belgium (BEL)	0	1	0	1
3	Finland (FIN)	0	1	0	1
3	Lithuania (LTU)	0	1	0	1
6	Norway (NOR)	0	0	2	2
7	Czech Republic (CZE)	0	0	1	1
7	Great Britain (GBR)	0	0	1	1
Totals (8 entries)		4	4	4	12

=== Boys' events ===
Event	Gold		Silver		Bronze	
Slopestyle	Nick Pünter; Switzerland	91.25	Jules De Sloover; Belgium	88.50	Sebastian Vik; Norway	86.00
Big air	Nick Pünter; Switzerland	184.25	Motiejus Morauskas; Lithuania	183.00	Gabriel Adams; Great Britain	169.25

=== Girls' events ===
Event	Gold		Silver		Bronze	
Slopestyle	Annika Morgan; Germany	90.25	Eveliina Taka; Finland	87.50	Marie Kreisingerová; Czech Republic	78.75
Big air	Bianca Gisler; Switzerland	167.00	Lena Müller; Switzerland	155.75	Stine Espeli Olsen; Norway	118.75
