= Blagoy Todev =

Bulgarian biathlete (born 2001)

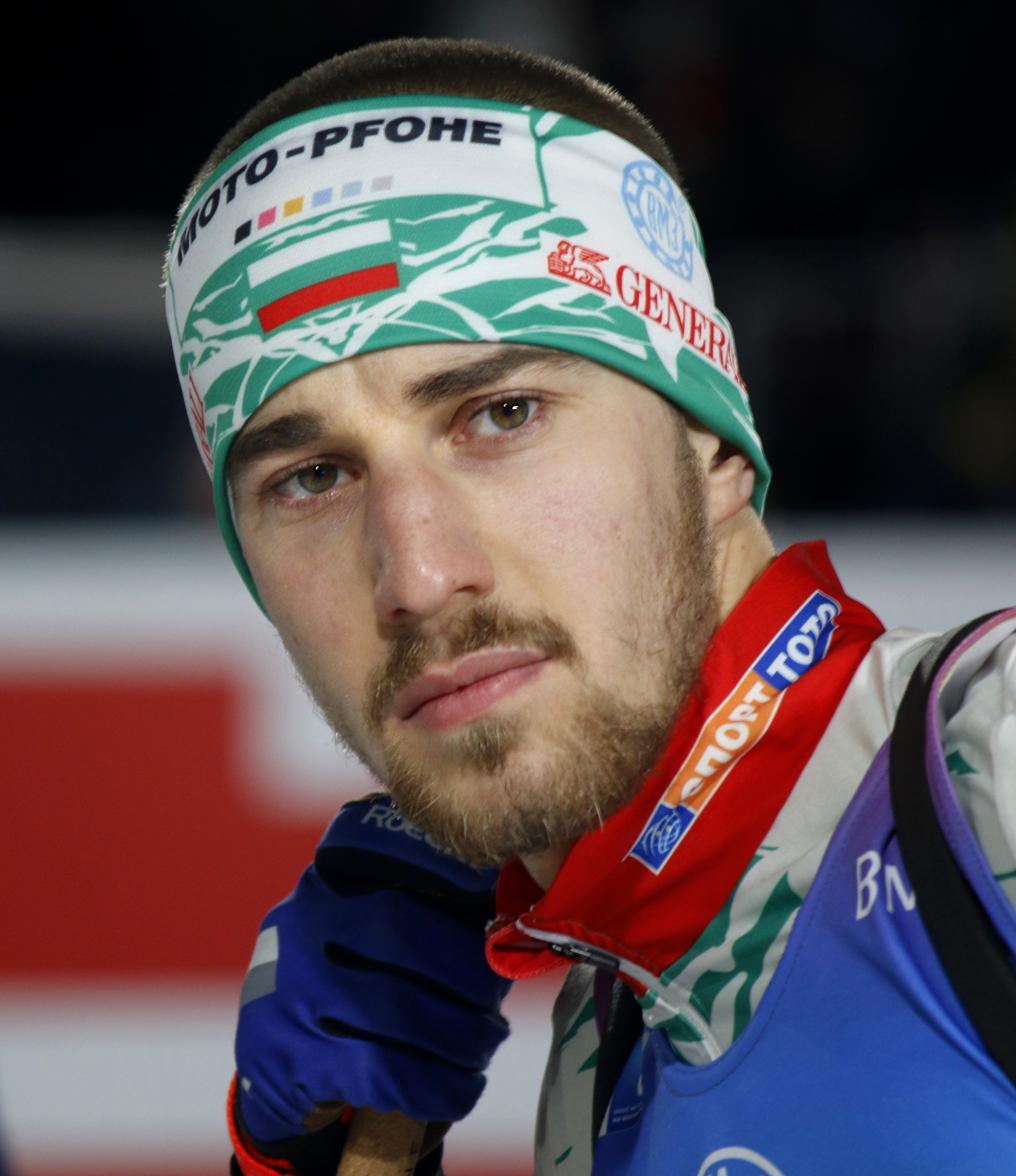
- Todev in 2024

Personal information
- Nationality: Bulgarian
- Born: 6 July 2001 (age 24) Bansko, Bulgaria

Sport
- Country: Bulgaria
- Sport: Biathlon
Medal record
Men's biathlon
Representing Bulgaria
Junior World Championships
Silver medal – second place	2022 Soldier Hollow	12.5 km pursuit

Blagoy Todev (Bulgarian: Благой Тодев; born 6 July 2001) is a Bulgarian biathlete. He made his debut in the Biathlon World Cup in 2020.

== Career ==
Blagoy Todev began started biathlon career at age 12 and made his international debut relatively late. His first major competition was the 2019 Youth World Championships, where he didn't perform notably. He started competing in the IBU Cup the following winter but consistently finished outside the top 60.

Despite his below-average results, Todew became a regular member of the World Cup team from the beginning of the 2020/21 season. He also competed at the 2021 World Championships in Pokljuka. He achieved top-15 finishes in three races at the 2021 Junior World Championships in Obertilliach.

Todev won his first international title at the Junior European Championships and was immediately nominated for the 2022 Olympics, where he finished 52nd in the sprint. Later in the season, he became Junior Vice-World Champion in the pursuit race and earned his first World Cup point in Otepää.

In the following season, Todev often finished in the top 60 in World Cup races thanks to consistently good shooting performances. He competed in the World Championships and won a medal at the 2023 Junior European Championships in Madona. However, he didn't achieve a top-10 result at the 2023 Junior World Championships. His best World Cup finish was 32nd place in Soldier Hollow.

== Biathlon results ==
All results are sourced from the International Biathlon Union.

=== Olympic Games ===
Event	Individual	Sprint	Pursuit	Mass start	Relay	Mixed relay
(China) 2022 Beijing	—	52nd	53rd	—	18th	—
(Italy) 2026 Milano Cortina	22nd	42th	—	—	—	16th

=== World Championships ===
Event	Individual	Sprint	Pursuit	Mass start	Relay	Mixed relay	Single mixed relay
(Slovenia) 2021 Pokljuka	—	92nd	—	—	16th	—	—
(Germany) 2023 Oberhof	—	DNS	—	—	—	17th	—
(Czech Republic) 2024 Nové Město	58th	74th	—	—	18th	22nd	17th
(Switzerland) 2025 Lenzerheide	59th	32nd	41st	—	15th	15th	11th
