= Monika Skinder =

Polish cross-country skier (born 2001)

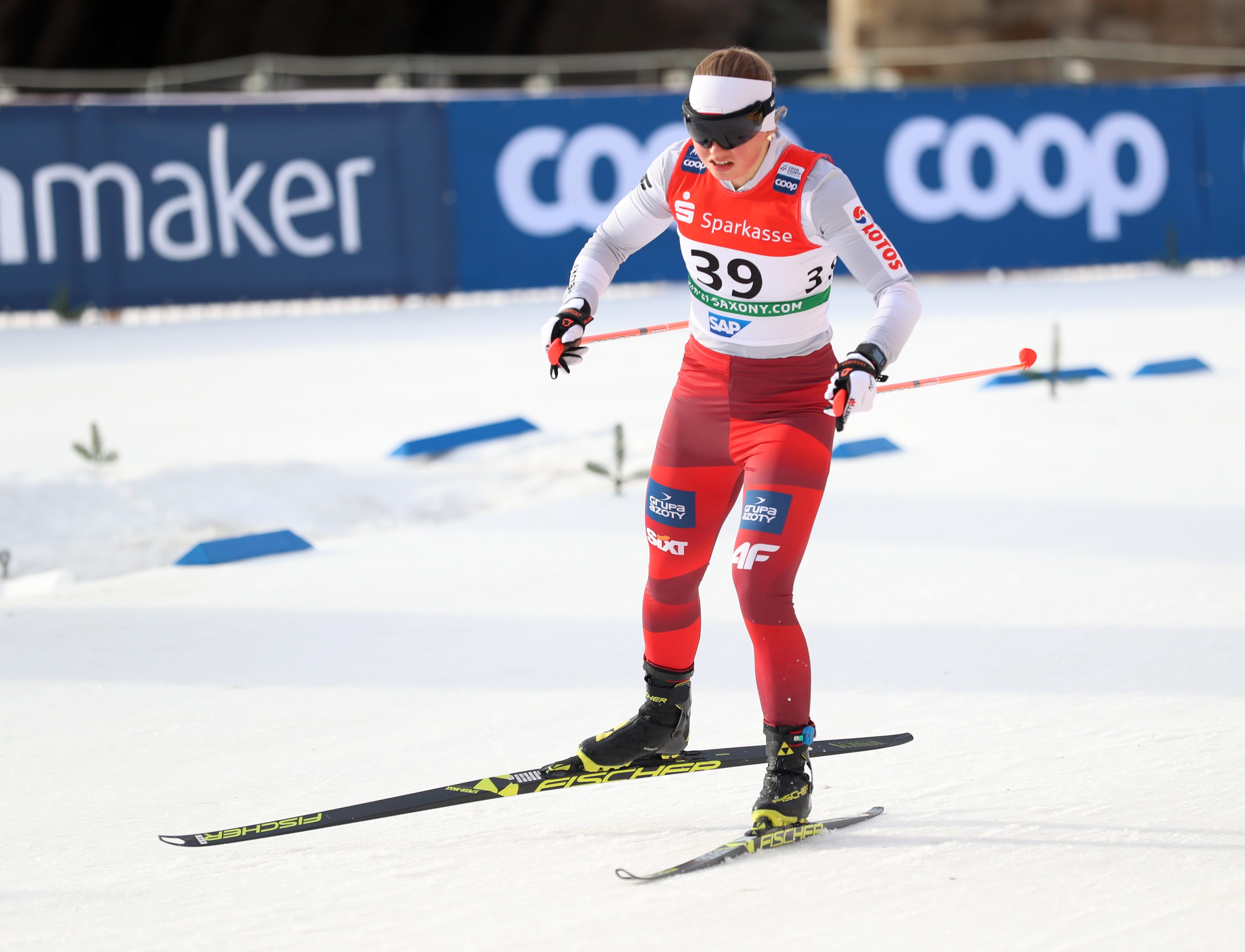
- Skinder in 2019

Personal information
- Nationality: Poland
- Born: 19 November 2001 (age 24) Tomaszów Lubelski, Poland

Sport
- Sport: Skiing
- Club: MULKS Grupa Oscar Tomaszów Lubelski

World Cup career
- Seasons: 6 – (2018–present)
- Indiv. starts: 33
- Indiv. podiums: 0
- Team starts: 6
- Team podiums: 0
- Overall titles: 0 – (62nd in 2021)
- Discipline titles: 0
Medal record
Women's cross-country skiing
Representing Poland
U23 World Championships
Silver medal – second place	2022 Lygna	Individual sprint
Junior World Championships
Gold medal – first place	2021 Vuokatti	Individual sprint
Silver medal – second place	2019 Lahti	Individual sprint
European Youth Olympic Winter Festival
Gold medal – first place	2019 Sarajevo	Individual sprint
Bronze medal – third place	2019 Sarajevo	7.5 km classical
- Updated on 27 March 2023

Monika Skinder (born 19 November 2001) is a Polish cross-country skier. She competed at the 2022 Winter Olympics, in Women's 10 kilometre classical, Women's sprint, and Women's 4 × 5 kilometre relay.

== Life and career ==
She was born on 19 November 2001 in Tomaszów Lubelski, Lublin Voivodeship, Poland. She represents the MULKS Grupa Oscar Tomaszów Lubelski sports club.

On 5 January 2016, she made her debut start at an international-level FIS event in cross-country skiing in Štrbské Pleso, Slovakia, where she claimed second place. At the 2018 Junior World Championships, she won the silver medal in the sprint. She made her World Cup debut on 3 March 2017 in Lahti, she finished in 55th place in the sprint event.

In 2019, she won the gold medal in girls' sprint as well as the bronze medal in girls' 7.5 km classical at the 2019 European Youth Olympic Winter Festival in Sarajevo.

In 2021, she won the gold medal in the girls' sprint at the 2021 Nordic Junior World Ski Championships in Vuokatti, Finland.

== Cross-country skiing results ==
All results are sourced from the International Ski Federation (FIS).

=== Olympic Games ===
Year	Age	10 km individual	15 km skiathlon	30 km mass start	Sprint	4 × 5 km relay	Team sprint
2022	20	49	—	—	42	14	9

=== World Championships ===
Year	Age	10 km individual	15 km skiathlon	30 km mass start	Sprint	4 × 5 km relay	Team sprint
2019	17	—	—	—	55	13	9
2021	19	—	—	—	31	12	15
2023	21	62	—	—	41	—	—

=== World Cup ===
==== Season standings ====
Season	Age	Discipline standings				Ski Tour standings			
Season	Age	Overall	Distance	Sprint	U23	Nordic Opening	Tour de Ski	Ski Tour 2020	World Cup Final
2018	16	NC	—	NC	NC	—	—	—N/a	—
2019	17	95	—	63	19	—	—	—N/a	—
2020	18	121	NC	87	32	DNF	DNF	—	—N/a
2021	19	62	NC	36	12	DNF	DNF	—N/a	—N/a
2022	20	112	NC	73	23	—N/a	—	—N/a	—N/a
2023	21	85	55	NC	16	—N/a	DNF	—N/a	—N/a
