= Noora Kaisa Keränen =

Finnish biathlete (born 2001)

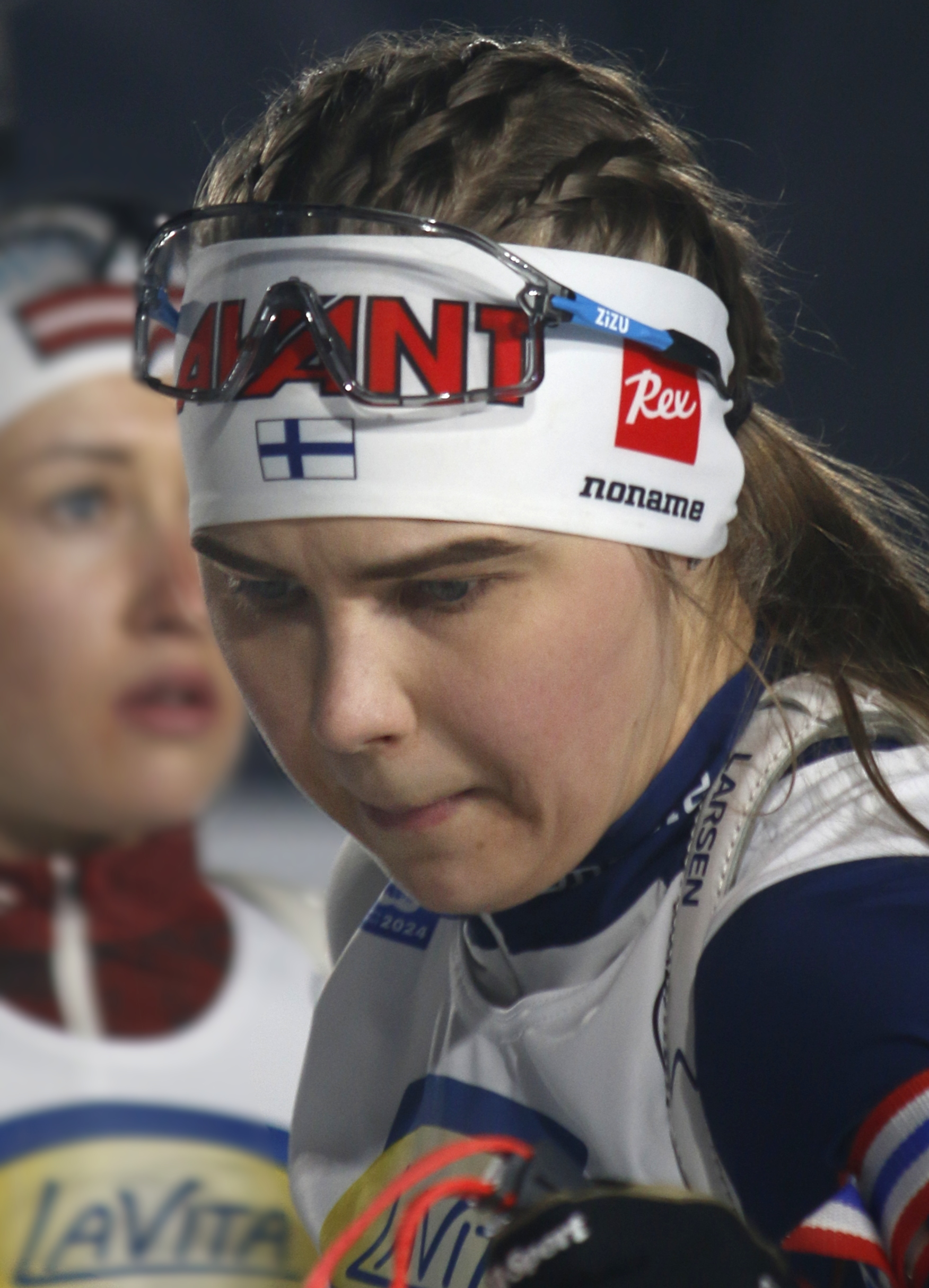
- Keranen in 2024

Personal information
- Nationality: Finnish
- Born: 17 October 2001 (age 25) Luumäki, Finland

Sport
- Country: Finland
- Sport: Biathlon

Noora Kaisa Keränen (born 17 October 2001) is a Finnish biathlete. She has competed in the Biathlon World Cup since 2023.

== Career ==
Noora Kaisa Keränen made her international debut at the 2018 Youth World Championships in Otepää, Estonia. She narrowly missed the gold medal in the relay event, competing alongside her sister Jenni and Heidi Nikkinen, with Nikkinen losing in a photo finish to Elvira Öberg. The following year, she participated again in the Youth World Championships, finishing 15th in the individual event. Additionally, she took part in the European Youth Festival and won the bronze medal in the mixed relay.

After another year in the junior ranks, the Finn made her IBU Cup debut in early 2021 at Arber, where she finished in the top ten in the single-mixed relay. She also participated in the European Championships, competing only in the mixed relay. Keränen earned her first IBU Cup ranking points during the winter of 2021/22, achieving a 26th place twice. She secured another medal by finishing third in the sprint at the 2022 IBU Junior Open European Championships, behind Selina Grotian and Chloé Bened. At the Junior World Championships, she achieved three top-10 finishes.

For the 2022/23 season, Keränen was selected for the national team but had to miss the first trimester due to illness. Except for two IBU Cup competitions, she participated only in the Junior European Championships and World Championships. In March 2023, she received her first start in the World Cup at the season finale in Oslo, finishing 90th in the sprint.

Starting the 2023/24 season, Keränen became a regular member of the World Cup squad. At the season opener in Östersund, she finished 64th in the individual event and, in the mixed relay, secured a tenth-place finish with Olli Hiidensalo, Tero Seppälä, and Erika Jänkä. In the Lenzerheide sprint competition, the Finn earned her first World Cup point, finishing 40th despite one shooting miss.

== Personal life ==
Noora Kaisa Keränen has two older sisters, Maija and Jenni, who are twins and were also active as biathletes, particularly at the junior level. Keränen is currently studying Public Law at the University of Eastern Finland in Joensuu. Noora Kaisa lives and trains in Vuokatti.

== Biathlon results ==
All results are sourced from the International Biathlon Union.

=== World Championships ===
Event	Individual	Sprint	Pursuit	Mass start	Relay	Mixed relay	Single mixed relay
(Czech Republic) 2024 Nové Město	54th	59th	50th	—	17th	—	—
(Switzerland) 2025 Lenzerheide	—	—	—	—	15th	—	—

=== Youth and Junior World Championships ===
1 medal (1 silver)

Year	Age	Individual	Sprint	Pursuit	Relay
(Estonia) 2018 Otepaeae	16	62nd	24th	15th	Silver
(Slovakia) 2019 Brezno-Osrblie	17	15th	56th	DNS	9th
(Switzerland) 2020 Lenzerheide	18	48th	22nd	12th	7th
(Austria) 2021 Obertilliach	19	60th	56th	47th	14th
(United States) 2022 Soldier Hollow	20	11th	9th	7th	9th
(Kazakhstan) 2023 Shchuchinsk	21	DNS	30th	15th	10th
