= Curling at the 2019 European Youth Olympic Winter Festival =

- Venue: Sports hall Peki
- Location: Pale, Bosnia and Herzegovina
- Date: 11–15 February
- Competitors: 56 from 14 nations
- Website: eyof2019.net

Location in Bosnia and Herzegovina

Curling at the 2019 European Youth Olympic Winter Festival was held from 11 to 15 February at Sports hall Peki in Istočno Sarajevo, Bosnia and Herzegovina.

A total of 14 mixed teams competed for one set of medals.

== Medal summary ==
=== Medal table ===
Rank	Nation	Gold	Silver	Bronze	Total
1	Great Britain (GBR)	1	0	0	1
2	Switzerland (SUI)	0	1	0	1
3	Hungary (HUN)	0	0	1	1
Totals (3 entries)		1	1	1	3

=== Medalists ===
Event	Gold	Silver	Bronze
Mixed teams	Great Britain; Hamish Gallacher; Robyn Munro; Angus Bryce; Inca Maguire	Switzerland; Jan Iseli; Xenia Schwaller; Maximilian Winz; Malin Da Ros	Hungary; Kristóf Szarvas; Dia Regina Dobor; Lőrinc Tatár; Blanka Biró

== Teams ==
=== Group A ===
Austria	Czech Republic	Denmark	Great Britain
Skip: David Zott; Third: Lisa Auer; Second: Johann Karg; Lead: Teresa Treichl	Skip: Jakub Rychlý; Third: Zuzana Pražáková; Second: David Jakl; Lead: Veronika Vašáková	Skip: Karolina Legaard Jensen; Third: Kilian Jacobsen; Second: Gabriella Qvist; Lead: Sean Søndergaard-Nielsen	Skip: Hamish Gallacher; Third: Robyn Munro; Second: Angus Bryce; Lead: Inca Maguire
Hungary	Russia	Turkey	
Fourth: Kristóf Szarvas; Third: Dia Regina Dobor; Skip: Lőrinc Tatár; Lead: Blanka Biró	Skip: Valeria Denisenko; Third: Nikolai Lysakov; Second: Alina Fakhurtdinova; Lead: Dmitrii Logvin	Fourth: Beytullah Özkan; Skip: İfayet Şafak Çalıkuşu; Second: Kadir Polat; Lead: Nisanur Kaya	

=== Group B ===
Croatia	Germany	Italy	Norway
Skip: Sven Prinčić; Third: Irena Grgić; Second: Marin Kaspet; Lead: Katarina Čar	Skip: Felix Messenzehl; Third: Kim Joana Sutor; Second: Johannes Scheuerl; Lead: Zoé Antes	Skip: Marta Lo Deserto; Third: Francesco De Zanna; Second: Anna Maria Maurino; Lead: Denis Manfè	Skip: Nicolai Sommervold; Third: Ronja Engevold Nordhagen; Second: Tinius Haslev Nordbye; Lead: Torild Bjørnstad
Poland	Slovenia	Switzerland	
Skip: Victoria Sitkiewicz; Third: Mateusz Chojnowski; Second: Kalina Ejsmont; Lead: Arkadiusz Ościk	Skip: Bine Sever; Third: Liza Gregori; Second: Jakob Omerzel; Lead: Sara Rigler	Skip: Jan Iseli; Third: Xenia Schwaller; Second: Maximilian Winz; Lead: Malin Da Ros	

== Round-robin standings ==
Key
Teams to Playoffs

Group A	Skip	W	L
Great Britain	Hamish Gallacher	6	0
Hungary	Lőrinc Tatár	5	1
Denmark	Karolina Legaard Jensen	4	2
Russia	Valeria Denisenko	3	3
Czech Republic	Jakub Rychlý	2	4
Turkey	İfayet Şafak Çalıkuşu	1	5
Austria	David Zott	0	6

Group B	Skip	W	L
Switzerland	Jan Iseli	6	0
Poland	Victoria Sitkiewicz	5	1
Germany	Felix Messenzehl	3	3
Italy	Marta Lo Deserto	3	3
Slovenia	Bine Sever	3	3
Norway	Nicolai Sommervold	1	5
Croatia	Sven Prinčić	0	6

== Round-robin results ==
All times are local (UTC+1).

=== Group A ===
	Team	Austria	Czech Republic	Denmark	Great Britain	Hungary	Russia	Turkey
1	Austria		3–7	1–13	1–17	3–9	1–16	2–8
2	Czech Republic	7–3		4–7	3–8	6–11	2–7	10–4
3	Denmark	13–1	7–4		3–7	4–8	5–2	7–6
4	Great Britain	17–1	8–3	7–3		7–2	8–5	6–2
5	Hungary	9–3	11–6	8–4	2–7		6–5	6–2
6	Russia	16–1	7–2	2–5	5–8	5–6		9–4
7	Turkey	8–2	4–10	6–7	2–6	2–6	4–9	

==== Draw 1 ====
Monday, 11 February, 8:30

Sheet A	1	2	3	4	5	6	7	8	Final
Austria (Zott)	1	0	1	0	0	1	0	X	3
Hungary (Tatár) 🔨	0	2	0	2	4	0	1	X	9

Sheet B	1	2	3	4	5	6	7	8	Final
Czech Republic (Rychlý)	0	0	0	0	1	0	2	X	3
Great Britain (Gallacher) 🔨	0	1	3	1	0	3	0	X	8

Sheet C	1	2	3	4	5	6	7	8	Final
Turkey (Çalıkuşu)	0	0	0	3	0	1	0	X	4
Russia (Denisenko) 🔨	2	3	2	0	1	0	1	X	9

==== Draw 3 ====
Monday, 11 February, 15:30

Sheet A	1	2	3	4	5	6	7	8	Final
Great Britain (Gallacher)	1	0	1	1	0	2	1	X	6
Turkey (Çalıkuşu) 🔨	0	1	0	0	1	0	0	X	2

Sheet B	1	2	3	4	5	6	7	8	Final
Austria (Zott)	0	0	1	0	0	0	X	X	1
Russia (Denisenko) 🔨	5	3	0	3	1	4	X	X	16

Sheet C	1	2	3	4	5	6	7	8	Final
Denmark (Legaard Jensen)	0	1	0	2	1	0	1	2	7
Czech Republic (Rychlý) 🔨	2	0	1	0	0	1	0	0	4

==== Draw 5 ====
Tuesday, 12 February, 9:30

Sheet A	1	2	3	4	5	6	7	8	Final
Hungary (Tatár)	2	1	0	0	2	1	0	X	6
Russia (Denisenko) 🔨	0	0	1	1	0	0	3	X	5

Sheet B	1	2	3	4	5	6	7	8	Final
Denmark (Legaard Jensen)	0	4	0	1	0	0	1	1	7
Turkey (Çalıkuşu) 🔨	2	0	1	0	1	2	0	0	6

Sheet C	1	2	3	4	5	6	7	8	Final
Great Britain (Gallacher) 🔨	5	0	6	2	4	0	X	X	17
Austria (Zott)	0	1	0	0	0	0	X	X	1

==== Draw 7 ====
Tuesday, 12 February, 17:30

Sheet A	1	2	3	4	5	6	7	8	Final
Denmark (Legaard Jensen)	0	2	0	0	1	0	0	X	3
Great Britain (Gallacher) 🔨	1	0	1	2	0	1	2	X	7

Sheet B	1	2	3	4	5	6	7	8	Final
Russia (Denisenko)	1	1	0	3	1	0	1	X	7
Czech Republic (Rychlý) 🔨	0	0	1	0	0	1	0	X	2

Sheet C	1	2	3	4	5	6	7	8	Final
Hungary (Tatár) 🔨	1	0	1	0	2	1	0	1	6
Turkey (Çalıkuşu)	0	1	0	0	0	0	1	0	2

==== Draw 9 ====
Wednesday, 13 February, 12:00

Sheet A	1	2	3	4	5	6	7	8	Final
Turkey (Çalıkuşu)	0	0	0	2	0	2	0	X	4
Czech Republic (Rychlý) 🔨	2	1	2	0	1	0	4	X	10

Sheet B	1	2	3	4	5	6	7	8	Final
Great Britain (Gallacher)	1	4	0	2	0	0	X	X	7
Hungary (Szarvas) 🔨	0	0	1	0	0	1	X	X	2

Sheet C	1	2	3	4	5	6	7	8	Final
Austria (Zott)	0	0	0	1	0	0	X	X	1
Denmark (Legaard Jensen) 🔨	2	1	4	0	6	0	X	X	13

==== Draw 11 ====
Wednesday, 13 February, 19:00

Sheet A	1	2	3	4	5	6	7	8	Final
Russia (Denisenko) 🔨	1	0	1	0	0	0	0	X	2
Denmark (Legaard Jensen)	0	1	0	2	1	0	1	X	5

Sheet B	1	2	3	4	5	6	7	8	Final
Turkey (Çalıkuşu) 🔨	1	0	0	3	1	2	1	X	8
Austria (Zott)	0	1	1	0	0	0	0	X	2

Sheet C	1	2	3	4	5	6	7	8	Final
Czech Republic (Rychlý)	1	2	0	2	0	1	0	0	6
Hungary (Tatár) 🔨	0	0	1	0	3	0	4	3	11

==== Draw 13 ====
Thursday, 14 February, 13:30

Sheet A	1	2	3	4	5	6	7	8	Final
Czech Republic (Rychlý) 🔨	1	0	2	0	1	3	0	X	7
Austria (Zott)	0	1	0	1	0	0	1	X	3

Sheet B	1	2	3	4	5	6	7	8	Final
Hungary (Tatár)	0	2	0	2	2	2	0	X	8
Denmark (Legaard Jensen) 🔨	2	0	1	0	0	0	1	X	4

Sheet C	1	2	3	4	5	6	7	8	Final
Russia (Denisenko) 🔨	1	0	0	3	0	1	0	X	5
Great Britain (Gallacher)	0	1	1	0	3	0	3	X	8

=== Group B ===
	Team	Croatia	Germany	Italy	Norway	Poland	Slovenia	Switzerland
1	Croatia		3–15	1–16	0–18	3–15	2–11	2–18
2	Germany	15–3		2–4	9–4	3–8	6–4	3–9
3	Italy	16–1	4–2		8–3	4–8	4–6	5–6
4	Norway	18–0	4–9	3–8		5–6	6–8	4–7
5	Poland	15–3	8–3	8–4	6–5		8–6	2–10
6	Slovenia	11–2	4–6	6–4	8–6	6–8		6–10
7	Switzerland	18–2	9–3	6–5	7–4	10–2	10–6	

==== Draw 2 ====
Monday, 11 February, 12:00

Sheet A	1	2	3	4	5	6	7	8	Final
Croatia (Prinčić) 🔨	0	2	0	0	0	0	1	X	3
Poland (Sitkiewicz)	2	0	4	3	3	3	0	X	15

Sheet B	1	2	3	4	5	6	7	8	Final
Germany (Messenzehl) 🔨	1	0	0	3	3	0	2	X	9
Norway (Sommervold)	0	3	0	0	0	1	0	X	4

Sheet C	1	2	3	4	5	6	7	8	Final
Switzerland (Iseli) 🔨	5	0	1	0	2	0	2	X	10
Slovenia (Sever)	0	1	0	2	0	3	0	X	6

==== Draw 4 ====
Monday, 11 February, 19:00

Sheet A	1	2	3	4	5	6	7	8	Final
Norway (Sommervold)	1	0	2	0	0	1	0	X	4
Switzerland (Iseli) 🔨	0	2	0	2	1	0	2	X	7

Sheet B	1	2	3	4	5	6	7	8	Final
Croatia (Prinčić)	0	1	0	0	1	0	0	X	2
Slovenia (Sever) 🔨	4	0	2	2	0	1	2	X	11

Sheet C	1	2	3	4	5	6	7	8	Final
Italy (Lo Deserto)	0	0	3	0	0	1	0	X	4
Germany (Messenzehl) 🔨	0	0	0	1	0	0	1	X	2

==== Draw 6 ====
Tuesday, 12 February, 13:30

Sheet A	1	2	3	4	5	6	7	8	Final
Poland (Sitkiewicz) 🔨	3	0	2	0	1	0	2	0	8
Slovenia (Sever)	0	1	0	2	0	1	0	2	6

Sheet B	1	2	3	4	5	6	7	8	9	Final
Italy (Lo Deserto) 🔨	2	0	0	2	0	0	1	0	0	5
Switzerland (Iseli)	0	1	1	0	1	1	0	1	1	6

Sheet C	1	2	3	4	5	6	7	8	Final
Norway (Sommervold) 🔨	4	1	6	4	1	2	X	X	18
Croatia (Prinčić)	0	0	0	0	0	0	X	X	0

==== Draw 8 ====
Wednesday, 13 February, 8:30

Sheet A	1	2	3	4	5	6	7	8	Final
Italy (Lo Deserto) 🔨	3	0	2	0	2	1	0	X	8
Norway (Sommervold)	0	1	0	1	0	0	1	X	3

Sheet B	1	2	3	4	5	6	7	8	Final
Slovenia (Sever) 🔨	0	0	0	0	3	0	1	0	4
Germany (Messenzehl)	1	1	1	1	0	1	0	1	6

Sheet C	1	2	3	4	5	6	7	8	Final
Poland (Sitkiewicz)	1	1	0	0	0	0	0	X	2
Switzerland (Iseli) 🔨	0	0	2	2	1	4	1	X	10

==== Draw 10 ====
Wednesday, 13 February, 15:30

Sheet A	1	2	3	4	5	6	7	8	Final
Switzerland (Iseli) 🔨	1	1	1	2	0	0	1	3	9
Germany (Messenzehl)	0	0	0	0	3	0	0	0	3

Sheet B	1	2	3	4	5	6	7	8	9	Final
Norway (Sommervold) 🔨	1	0	2	0	0	2	0	0	0	5
Poland (Sitkiewicz)	0	1	0	1	1	0	1	1	1	6

Sheet C	1	2	3	4	5	6	7	8	Final
Croatia (Prinčić)	0	0	0	1	0	0	X	X	1
Italy (Lo Deserto) 🔨	3	4	6	0	1	2	X	X	16

==== Draw 12 ====
Thursday, 14 February, 9:30

Sheet A	1	2	3	4	5	6	7	8	Final
Slovenia (Sever) 🔨	1	0	0	0	1	1	0	2	6
Italy (Lo Deserto)	0	2	1	0	0	0	1	0	4

Sheet B	1	2	3	4	5	6	7	8	Final
Switzerland (Iseli) 🔨	4	3	2	0	5	4	X	X	18
Croatia (Prinčić)	0	0	0	2	0	0	X	X	2

Sheet C	1	2	3	4	5	6	7	8	Final
Germany (Messenzehl)	0	2	0	0	0	1	0	X	3
Poland (Sitkiewicz) 🔨	1	0	2	1	2	0	2	X	8

==== Draw 14 ====
Thursday, 14 February, 17:00

Sheet A	1	2	3	4	5	6	7	8	Final
Germany (Messenzehl) 🔨	5	2	2	0	4	0	2	X	15
Croatia (Prinčić)	0	0	0	2	0	1	0	X	3

Sheet B	1	2	3	4	5	6	7	8	Final
Poland (Sitkiewicz)	1	0	1	0	3	2	1	X	8
Italy (Lo Deserto) 🔨	0	1	0	3	0	0	0	X	4

Sheet C	1	2	3	4	5	6	7	8	Final
Slovenia (Sever) 🔨	1	4	1	0	1	0	0	1	8
Norway (Sommervold)	0	0	0	1	0	3	2	0	6

== Playoffs ==
=== Bracket ===
Semifinals
A1	Great Britain	8
B2	Poland	2
B1	Switzerland	8
A2	Hungary	3

Gold medal game
Great Britain	6
Switzerland	2
Bronze medal game
Poland	3
Hungary	10

=== Semifinals ===
Friday, 15 February, 9:00

Sheet A	1	2	3	4	5	6	7	8	Final
Great Britain (Gallacher) 🔨	3	0	0	1	3	1	X	X	8
Poland (Sitkiewicz)	0	1	1	0	0	0	X	X	2

Sheet C	1	2	3	4	5	6	7	8	Final
Hungary (Tatár)	0	1	0	0	1	1	X	X	3
Switzerland (Iseli) 🔨	2	0	4	2	0	0	X	X	8

=== Bronze medal game ===
Friday, 15 February, 13:30

Sheet A	1	2	3	4	5	6	7	8	Final
Poland (Sitkiewicz)	1	0	0	1	0	1	0	X	3
Hungary (Tatár) 🔨	0	2	3	0	2	0	3	X	10

=== Gold medal game ===
Friday, 15 February, 13:30

Sheet B	1	2	3	4	5	6	7	8	Final
Great Britain (Gallacher)	1	1	0	1	0	2	0	1	6
Switzerland (Iseli) 🔨	0	0	1	0	0	0	1	0	2

== Final standings ==
The final standings are:

Place	Team	Record
1st place, gold medalist(s)	Great Britain	8–0
2nd place, silver medalist(s)	Switzerland	7–1
3rd place, bronze medalist(s)	Hungary	6–2
4	Poland	5–3
5	Denmark	4–2
6	Germany	3–3
7	Russia	3–3
8	Italy	3–3
9	Czech Republic	2–4
10	Slovenia	3–3
11	Turkey	1–5
12	Norway	1–5
13	Austria	0–6
14	Croatia	0–6
