= Hedda Østberg Amundsen =

Norwegian cross-country skier

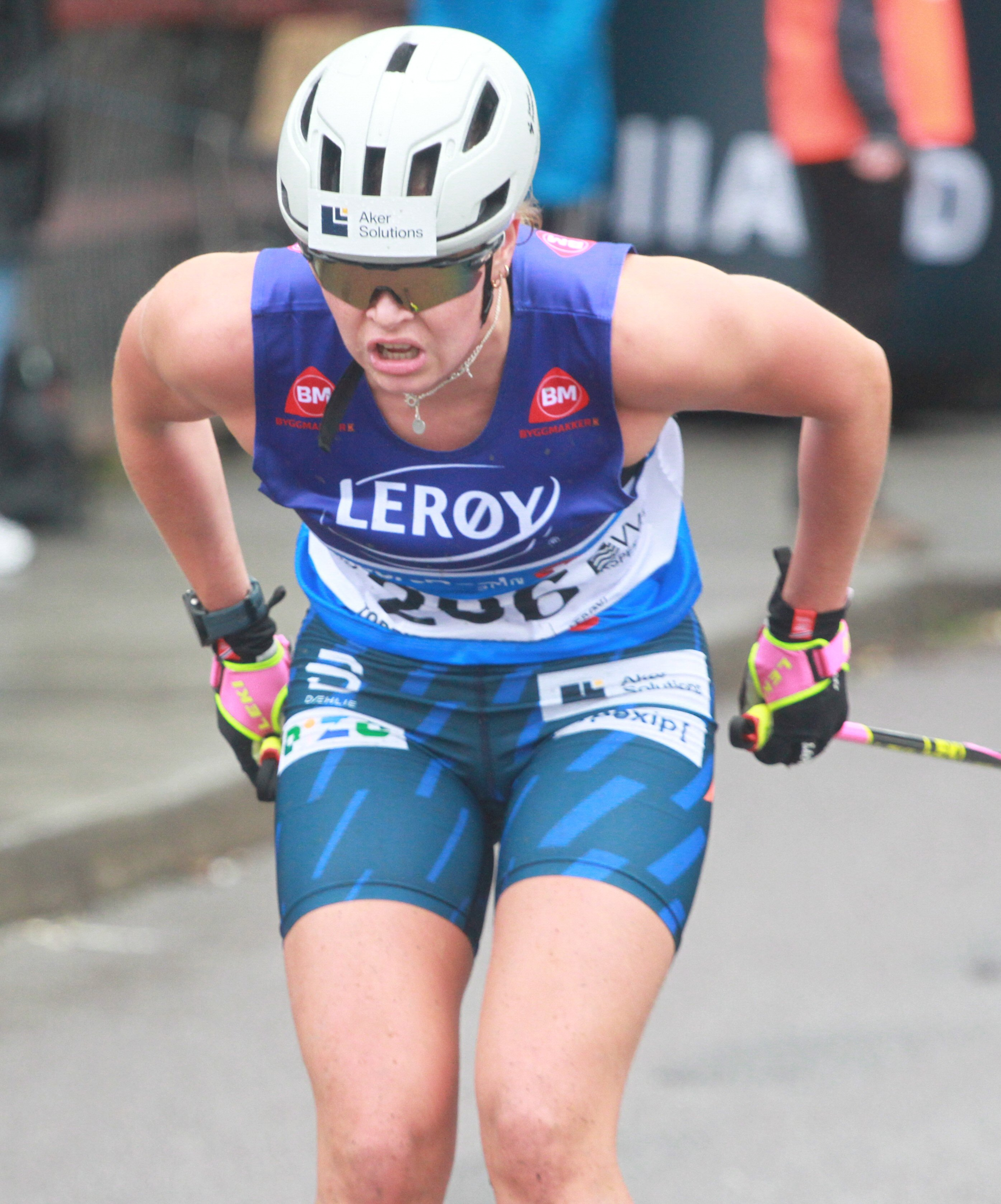

Personal information
- Nationality: Norway
- Born: 18 September 1998 (age 27)

Sport
- Sport: Skiing
- Club: Asker SK

World Cup career
- Seasons: 5 – (2019–present)
- Indiv. starts: 21
- Indiv. podiums: 0
- Team starts: 0
- Overall titles: 0 – (59th in 2021)
- Discipline titles: 0
Medal record
Women's cross-country skiing
Representing Norway
U23 World Championships
Gold medal – first place	2020 Oberwiesenthal	4 × 5 km mixed relay
Gold medal – first place	2021 Vuokatti	4 × 5 km mixed relay
Bronze medal – third place	2021 Vuokatti	10 km freestyle
- Updated on 27 March 2023

Hedda Østberg Amundsen (born 18 September 1998) is a Norwegian cross-country skier.

At the 2018 Junior World Championships she recorded an 11th place, a ninth place as well as a seventh place in the relay. She made her World Cup debut in December 2018 at Beitostølen and collected her first World Cup points with an 18th place at the 2019 Holmenkollen ski festival.

She represents the sports club Asker SK. She is the twin sister of Harald Østberg Amundsen.

== Cross-country skiing results ==
All results are sourced from the International Ski Federation (FIS).

=== World Cup ===
==== Season standings ====
Season	Age	Discipline standings				Ski Tour standings			
Season	Age	Overall	Distance	Sprint	U23	Nordic Opening	Tour de Ski	Ski Tour 2020	World Cup Final
2019	20	90	66	NC	18	—	—	—N/a	—
2020	21	112	78	—	29	—	—	—	—N/a
2021	22	59	57	53	10	23	—	—N/a	—N/a
2022	23	76	59	63	—N/a	—N/a	—	—N/a	—N/a
2023	24	61	70	34	—N/a	—N/a	—	—N/a	—N/a
