= Figure skating at the 2019 European Youth Olympic Winter Festival =

- Date: February 13 – 14
- Season: 2018–19
- Location: Sarajevo, Bosnia and Herzegovina
- Venue: Skenderija Hall

Champions
- Men's singles: (Russia) Ilya Yablokov
- Ladies' singles: (Russia) Anna Shcherbakova
- Previous: 2017 European Youth Olympic Winter Festival
- Next: 2022 European Youth Olympic Winter Festival

Figure skating at the 2019 European Youth Olympic Winter Festival was held on 13 and 14 February at the Skenderija Hall in Sarajevo, Bosnia and Herzegovina. Medals were awarded in men's and ladies' singles. Eligible skaters must have been born between July 1, 2002 and June 30, 2004.

== Competition schedule ==
Date	Time	Event
13 February	13:00	Girls' short program
13 February	17:40	Boys' short program
14 February	13:00	Girls' free skating
14 February	18:10	Boys' free skating
Source: All times are (UTC+1)

== Medal summary ==
=== Medalists ===
Event	Gold	Silver	Bronze
Boys	Ilya Yablokov; Russia	Mihhail Selevko; Estonia	Yauheni Puzanau; Belarus
Girls	Anna Shcherbakova; Russia	Lucrezia Beccari; Italy	Anastasiia Arkhipova; Ukraine

=== Medal table ===
Rank	Nation	Gold	Silver	Bronze	Total
1	Russia (RUS)	2	0	0	2
2	Estonia (EST)	0	1	0	1
2	Italy (ITA)	0	1	0	1
4	Belarus (BLR)	0	0	1	1
4	Ukraine (UKR)	0	0	1	1
Totals (5 entries)		2	2	2	6

== Results ==
=== Boys ===
Rank	Name	Nation	Total points	SP		FS	
1	Ilya Yablokov	Russia	211.62	1	74.76	1	136.86
2	Mihhail Selevko	Estonia	180.29	2	68.31	5	111.98
3	Yauheni Puzanau	Belarus	175.07	4	57.04	2	118.03
4	Kims Georgs Pavlovs	Latvia	172.13	3	59.80	4	112.33
5	Andreas Nordebäck	Sweden	171.90	5	56.95	3	114.95
6	Andrey Kokura	Ukraine	150.74	6	55.98	8	94.76
7	Alp Eren Özkan	Turkey	144.30	9	50.18	9	94.12
8	Daniel Mrázek	Czech Republic	143.96	12	44.11	6	99.85
9	Lilian Binzari	Moldova	141.72	13	43.11	7	98.61
10	Louis Weissert	Germany	138.42	7	55.23	12	83.19
11	Nikolaj Memola	Italy	137.71	11	46.73	10	90.98
12	Leon Auspurg	Switzerland	134.69	10	48.17	11	86.52
13	Arnau Joly Atanasio	Spain	119.93	8	50.53	14	69.40
14	Joseph Zakipour	Great Britain	114.45	14	41.38	13	73.07
15	Luka Logar	Slovenia	90.54	15	32.89	15	57.65

=== Girls ===
Rank	Name	Nation	Total points	SP		FS	
1	Anna Shcherbakova	Russia	202.79	1	72.57	1	130.22
2	Lucrezia Beccari	Italy	173.69	2	58.91	2	114.78
3	Anastasiia Arkhipova	Ukraine	161.73	3	58.58	3	103.15
4	Eva-Lotta Kiibus	Estonia	155.93	5	54.21	4	101.72
5	Anaïs Coraducci	Switzerland	151.68	6	52.50	5	99.18
6	Alina Urushadze	Georgia	151.29	4	55.99	7	95.30
7	Stefanie Pesendorfer	Austria	147.01	8	49.35	6	97.66
8	Ann-Christin Marold	Germany	128.72	13	41.39	8	87.33
9	Caya Scheepens	Netherlands	127.74	14	41.38	9	86.36
10	Linnea Ceder	Finland	125.04	9	46.25	11	78.79
11	Anete Lāce	Latvia	124.82	17	39.59	10	85.23
12	Aliaksandra Chepeleva	Belarus	118.58	10	44.78	14	73.80
13	Júlia Láng	Hungary	118.56	7	50.78	22	67.78
14	Leona Rogić	Serbia	115.66	20	38.33	12	77.33
15	Océane Piegad	France	114.86	11	41.99	15	72.87
16	Hana Cvijanović	Croatia	114.23	12	41.65	16	72.58
17	Ema Doboszová	Slovakia	113.95	16	39.74	13	74.21
18	Magdalena Zawadzka	Poland	113.08	15	40.99	17	72.09
19	Klára Štěpánová	Czech Republic	110.62	18	39.23	18	71.39
20	Ivelina Baycheva	Bulgaria	107.77	19	38.44	21	69.33
21	Marta María Jóhannsdóttir	Iceland	104.29	24	34.59	20	69.70
22	Güzide Irmak Bayır	Turkey	103.95	25	33.80	19	70.15
23	Genevieve Somerville	Great Britain	101.92	21	36.58	24	65.34
24	Ana Čmer	Slovenia	100.43	22	34.95	23	65.48
25	Ana Sofia Beşchea	Romania	98.50	23	34.82	25	63.68
26	Gemma Marshall	Luxembourg	90.92	28	30.45	26	60.47
27	Marina Asoyan	Armenia	77.63	26	30.90	27	46.73
28	Angela Camp Torres	Andorra	74.72	27	30.48	28	44.24
29	Malamatenia Karagianni	Greece	50.77	29	19.68	29	31.09
