= Biathlon at the 2019 European Youth Olympic Winter Festival =

- Venue: Nordic ski center Dvorišta
- Date: 12–15 February
- Website: eyof2019.net

Location in Bosnia and Herzegovina

Biathlon at the 2019 European Youth Olympic Winter Festival was held from 12 to 15 February at Nordic ski center Dvorišta, Pale, Bosnia and Herzegovina.

== Competition schedule ==
Date	Time	Event
12 February	11:00	Boys' sprint
12 February	14:00	Girls' sprint
13 February	10:00	Boys' individual
13 February	13:30	Girls' individual
15 February	10:00	Mixed relay
Source: All times are (UTC+1)

== Medal summary ==
=== Medal table ===
Rank	Nation	Gold	Silver	Bronze	Total
1	France (FRA)	2	1	0	3
2	Norway (NOR)	2	0	0	2
3	Germany (GER)	1	1	0	2
4	Switzerland (SUI)	0	2	0	2
5	Slovenia (SLO)	0	1	0	1
6	Russia (RUS)	0	0	2	2
7	Austria (AUT)	0	0	1	1
7	Finland (FIN)	0	0	1	1
7	Ukraine (UKR)	0	0	1	1
Totals (9 entries)		5	5	5	15

=== Boys' events ===
Event	Gold		Silver		Bronze	
Individual	Hans Köllner; Germany	42:47.3 (0+0+1+0)	Benjamin Menz; Germany	43:59.1 (1+0+0+0)	Stepan Kinash; Ukraine	44:16.3 (0+1+0+0)
Sprint	Éric Perrot; France	24:31.7 (0+1)	Lovro Planko; Slovenia	24:40.9 (1+2)	Ilia Anisimov; Russia	24:51.6 (1+0)

=== Girls' events ===
Event	Gold		Silver		Bronze	
Individual	Noémie Remonnay; France	38:17.4 (1+0+0+0)	Lea Meier; Switzerland	38:20.3 (0+1+0+1)	Sofia Tsyplukhina; Russia	38:58.9 (0+0+0+2)
Sprint	Hanna Børve; Norway	22:13.5 (1+0)	Lea Meier; Switzerland	22:25.6 (0+1)	Anna Gandler; Austria	22:46.9 (0+2)

=== Team event ===
Event	Gold		Silver		Bronze	
Mixed relay	Norway (NOR); Frida Tormodsgard Dokken; Hanna Børve; Eirik Idland; Morten Hol	1:26:58.5 (0+0) (0+1) (0+1) (0+2) (0+0) (0+0) (0+1) (0+1)	France (FRA); Noémie Remonnay; Maya Cloetens; Mathieu Garcia; Éric Perrot	1:28:08.5 (0+0) (0+1) (0+0) (0+3) (0+2) (0+0) (0+2) (0+2)	Finland (FIN); Heidi Nikkinen; Noora Kaisa Keranen; Matias Maijala; Ville-Valtter Karvinen	1:28:35.9 (1+3) (0+1) (0+0) (0+3) (0+0) (0+2) (0+0) (0+3)
