= 2019 European Youth Olympic Winter Festival =

2019 edition of the European Youth Olympic Winter Festival

- Host city: Sarajevo & Istočno Sarajevo
- Country: Bosnia and Herzegovina
- Motto: We create together!
- Nations: 46
- Athletes: 1,537
- Sport: 8
- Events: 32
- Opening: 10 February 2019
- Closing: 15 February 2019
- Opened by: Milorad Dodik, Janez Kocijančič, Abdulah Skaka and Nenad Vuković
- Athlete's Oath: Asja Klačar
- Judge's Oath: Slaviša Lučić
- Torch lighter: Larisa Cerić
- Main venue: Koševo Stadium
- Website: eyof2019.net

Summer

Winter

The 2019 European Youth Olympic Winter Festival (Bosnian: Evropski zimski olimpijski festival mladih 2019) was held in Sarajevo & Istočno Sarajevo, Bosnia and Herzegovina from 10 to 15 February 2019.

The event had initially been planned to be held in 2017, whereas the 2019 EYOF had been planned for Erzurum. In November 2015, the two cities agreed to swap their events, since Sarajevo and Istočno Sarajevo could not be ready in time, while Erzurum already had facilities in place from the 2011 Winter Universiade.

Within the framework of the EYOF 2019 project, there were around 750 recruited volunteers, the majority of which were students.

== Sports ==
2019 European Youth Olympic Winter Festival Sports Programme
- Alpine skiing (5)
- Biathlon (5)
- Cross-country skiing (7)
- Curling (1)
- Figure skating (2)
- Ice hockey (1)
- Short track speed skating (7)
- Snowboarding (4)

== Venues ==
=== Sarajevo ===
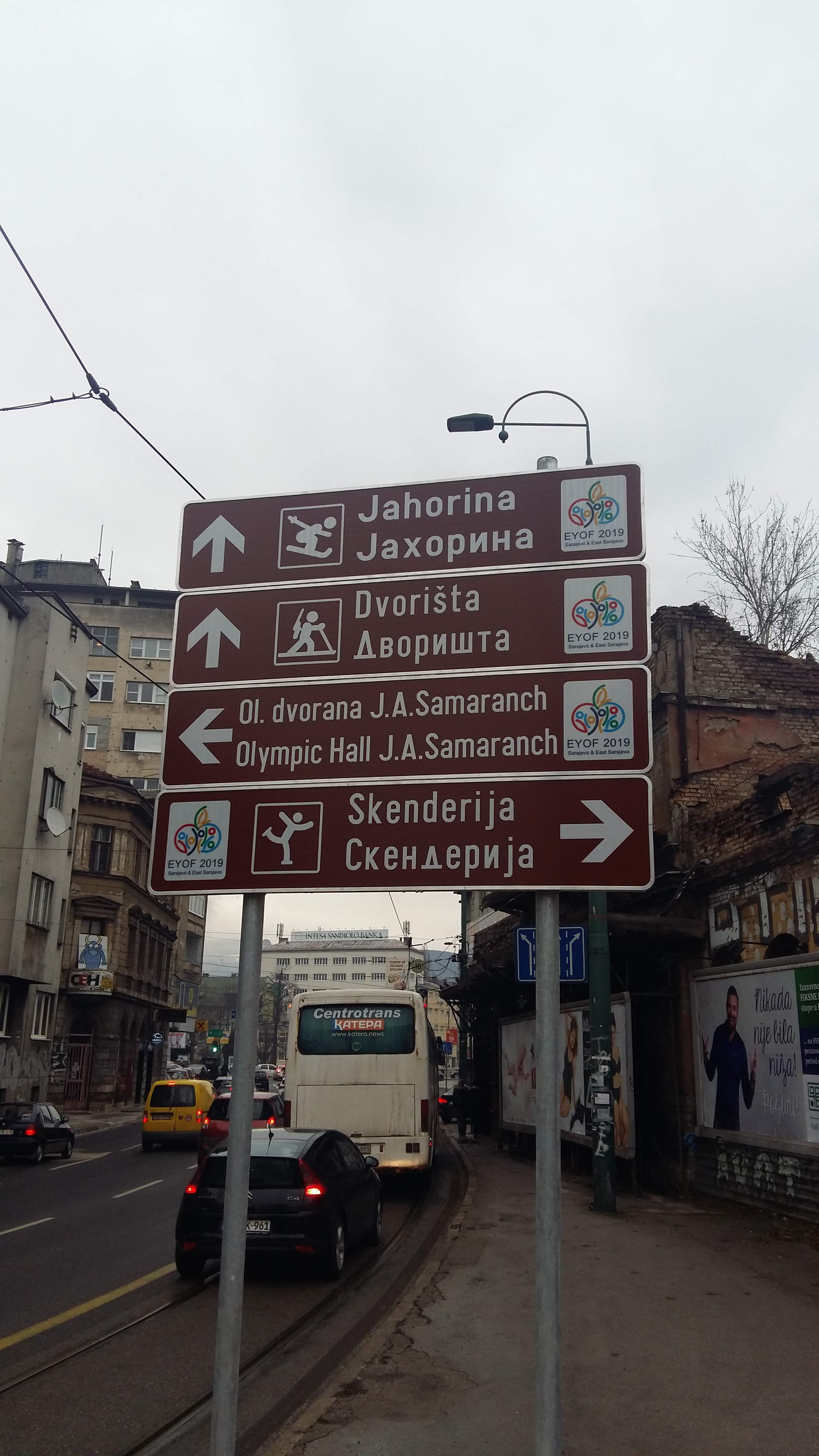
Street sign in Sarajevo placed to mark venues for this EYOF

Venue	Sports
City Stadium Koševo	Opening ceremony
Zetra Olympic Hall	Ice hockey
Bjelašnica	Alpine skiing (Mixed team Parallel Giant Slalom), Snowboarding
Igman	Cross country skiing
Skenderija Hall	Figure skating, Short track speed skating

=== Istočno Sarajevo ===
Venue	Sports
Istočno Sarajevo City Hall	Closing ceremony
Jahorina ski resort	Alpine skiing (Giant Slalom and Slalom)
Nordic ski center Dvorišta-Pale	Biathlon
Sports hall Peki	Curling

== Schedule ==
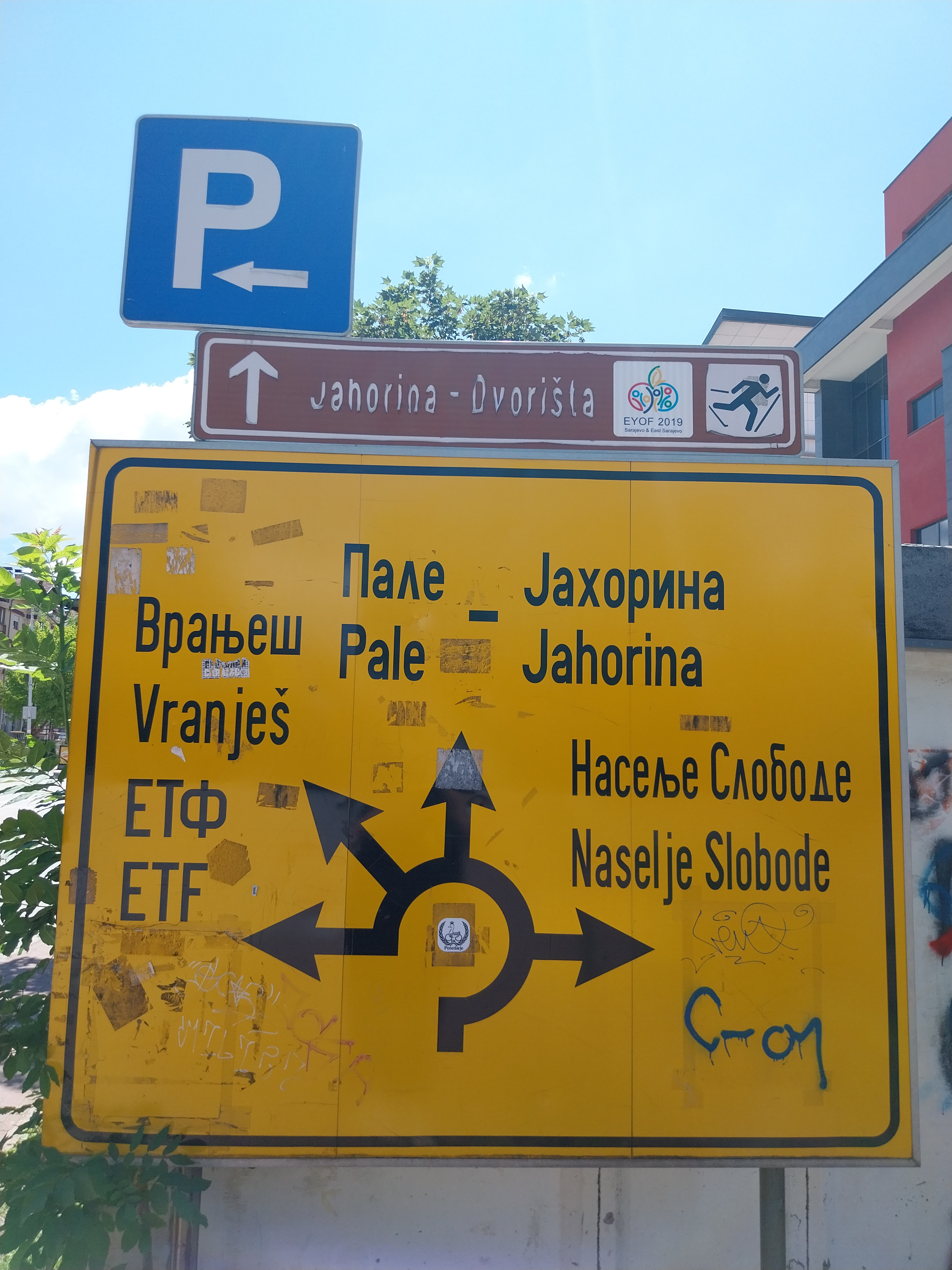
Street sign in Istočno Sarajevo placed to mark venues for this EYOF

The competition schedule for the 2019 European Youth Olympic Winter Festival is as follows:

OC	Opening ceremony	1	Event finals	CC	Closing ceremony	●	Event competitions

February	10 Sun	11 Mon	12 Tue	13 Wed	14 Thu	15 Fri	Events
Ceremonies	OC					CC	
Alpine skiing		1	1	1	1	1	5
Biathlon			2	2		1	5
Cross-country skiing		2	2		2	1	7
Curling		●	●	●	●	1	1
Figure skating				●	2		2
Ice hockey		●	●	●	1		1
Short track speed skating		2	2			3	7
Snowboarding		●	2		2		4
Total events		5	9	3	8	7	32
Cumulative total		5	14	17	25	32	32
February	10 Sun	11 Mon	12 Tue	13 Wed	14 Thu	15 Fri	Events

== Participating nations ==
46 national Olympic Committees sent athletes. Azerbaijan, Malta, Monaco did not compete.

Participating National Olympic Committees
- Albania (1 delegation)
- Andorra (6)
- Armenia (5)
- Austria (34)
- Belarus (46)
- Belgium (16)
- Bosnia and Herzegovina (21)
- Bulgaria (16)
- Croatia (10)
- Cyprus (2)
- Czech Republic (53)
- Denmark (19)
- Estonia (17)
- Finland (48)
- France (36)
- Georgia (6)
- Germany (38)
- Great Britain (27)
- Greece (11)
- Hungary (17)
- Iceland (13)
- Ireland (2)
- Italy (38)
- Kosovo (2)
- Latvia (19)
- Liechtenstein (5)
- Lithuania (12)
- Luxembourg (4)
- North Macedonia (2)
- Moldova (1)
- Montenegro (2)
- Netherlands (6)
- Norway (36)
- Poland (37)
- Portugal (1)
- Romania (30)
- Russia (61)
- San Marino (3)
- Serbia (3)
- Slovakia (45)
- Slovenia (32)
- Spain (6)
- Sweden (18)
- Switzerland (58)
- Turkey (35)
- Ukraine (22)

== Medal table ==
Rank	Nation	Gold	Silver	Bronze	Total
1	Norway	6	1	5	12
2	Switzerland	5	5	2	12
3	France	4	3	4	11
4	Austria	3	1	2	6
5	Hungary	3	0	3	6
6	Russia	2	7	3	12
7	Slovakia	2	2	0	4
8	Poland	2	1	2	5
9	Germany	2	1	1	4
10	Italy	1	3	1	5
11	Czech Republic	1	0	1	2
11	Great Britain	1	0	1	2
13	Slovenia	0	2	0	2
14	Belarus	0	1	2	3
14	Finland	0	1	2	3
16	Turkey	0	1	1	2
17	Belgium	0	1	0	1
17	Estonia	0	1	0	1
17	Lithuania	0	1	0	1
20	Netherlands	0	0	2	2
20	Ukraine	0	0	2	2
Totals (21 entries)		32	32	34	98

== Opening ceremony ==
Opening ceremony was held on City Stadium Koševo on 10 February 2019 at 19:00. The name of the ceremony is "We create together", which is selected as the title of main music-dance performance. Flame at opening ceremony was lit by Larisa Cerić, Bosnian judoka, and event is officially opened by Milorad Dodik, at the time the chairman of the Presidency of Bosnia and Herzegovina together with Janez Kocijančić, president of EOC, Abdulah Skaka, mayor of Sarajevo and Nenad Vuković, mayor of Istočno Sarajevo.

Opening ceremony

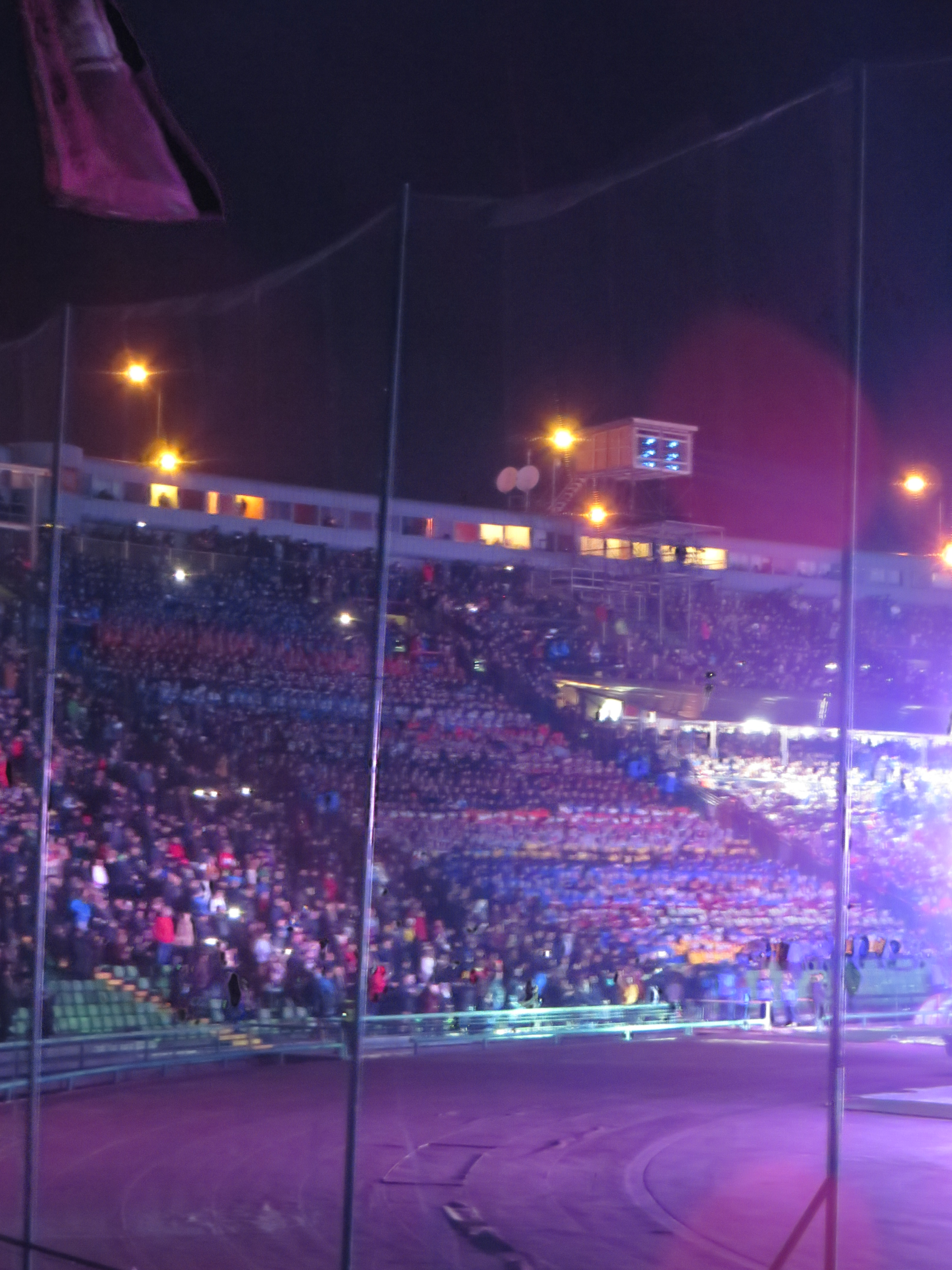
All athletes and trainers sitting at the opening ceremony

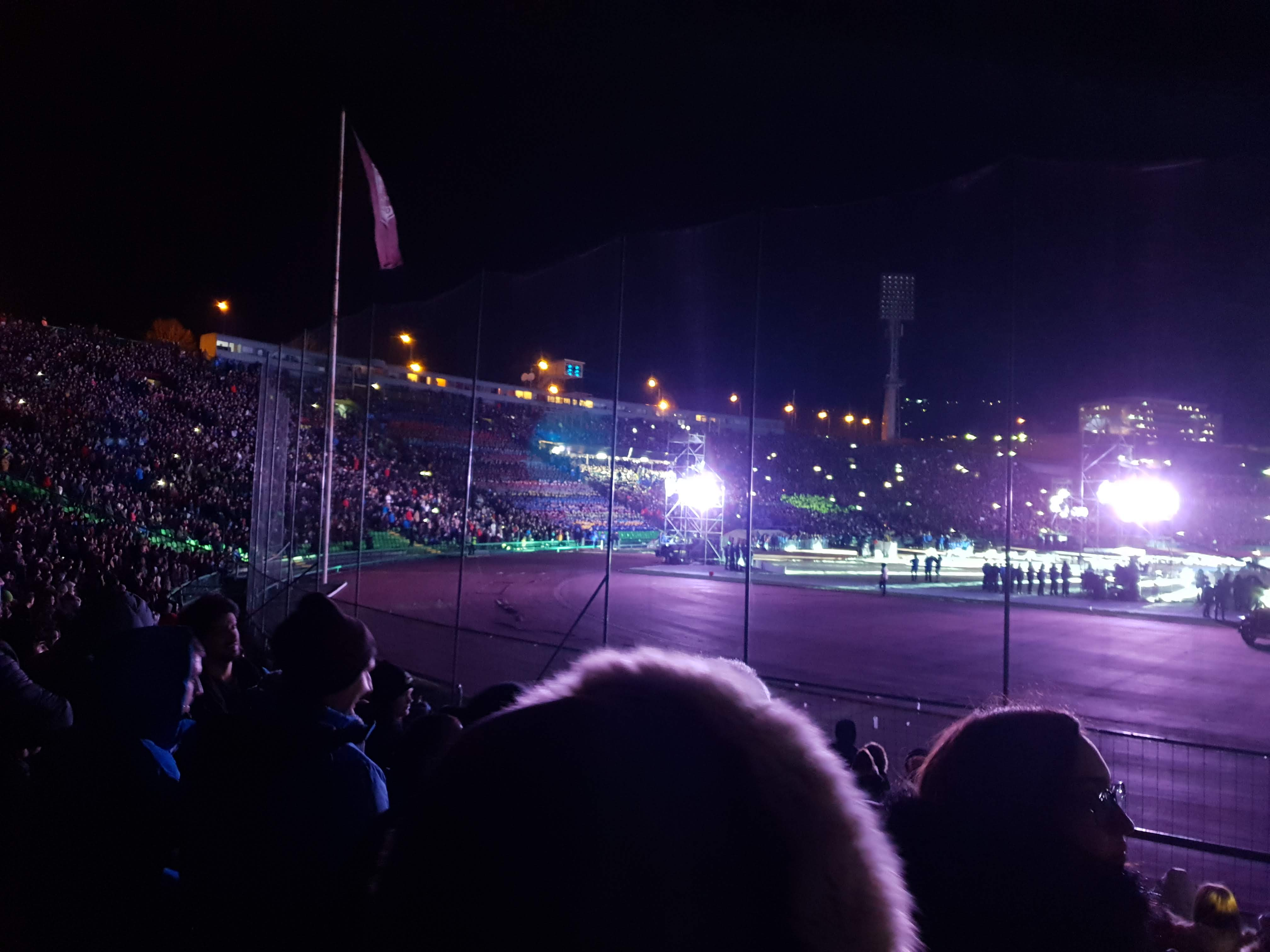
West stand of Koševo stadium

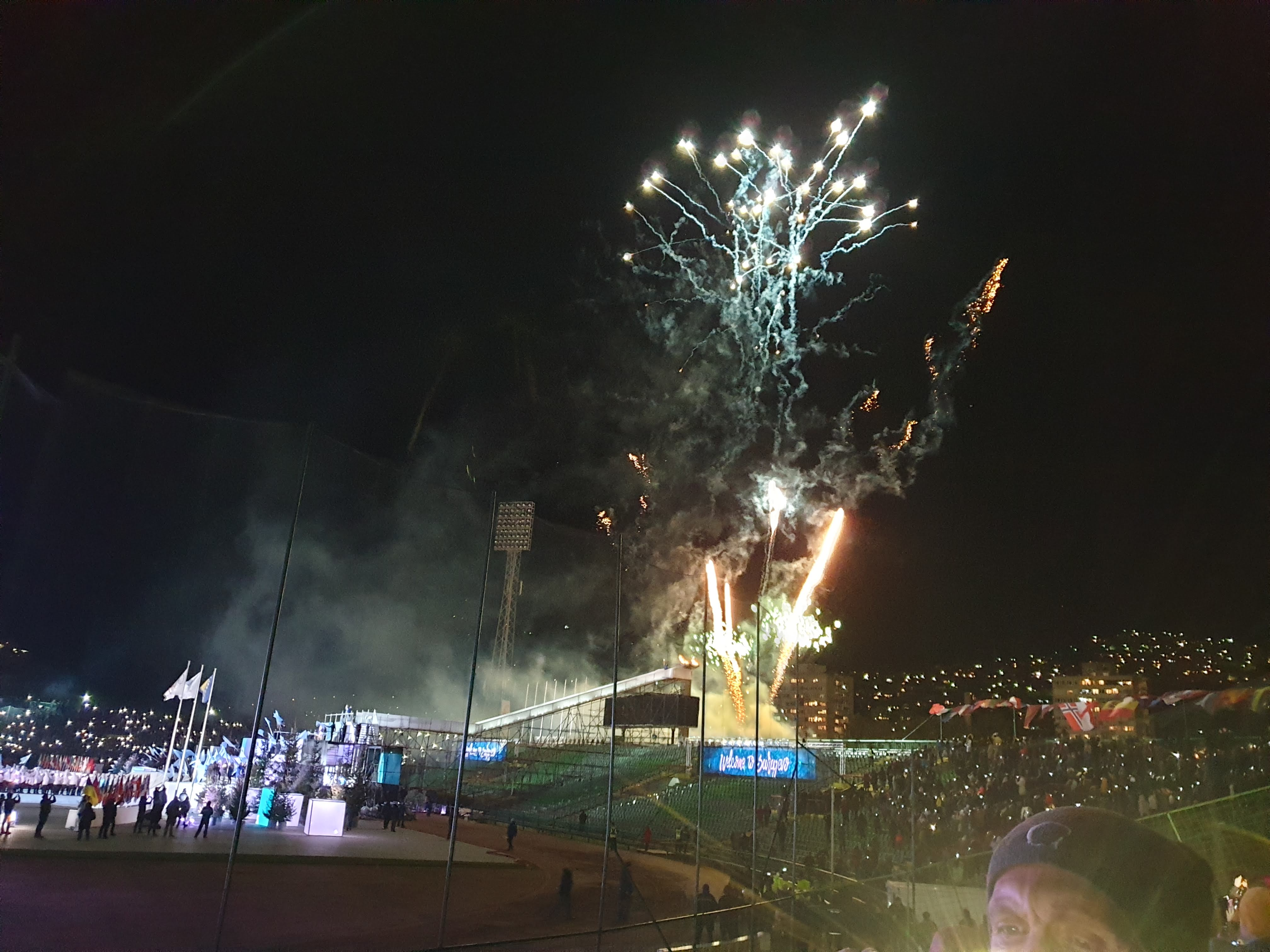
Fireworks at the end of the opening ceremony

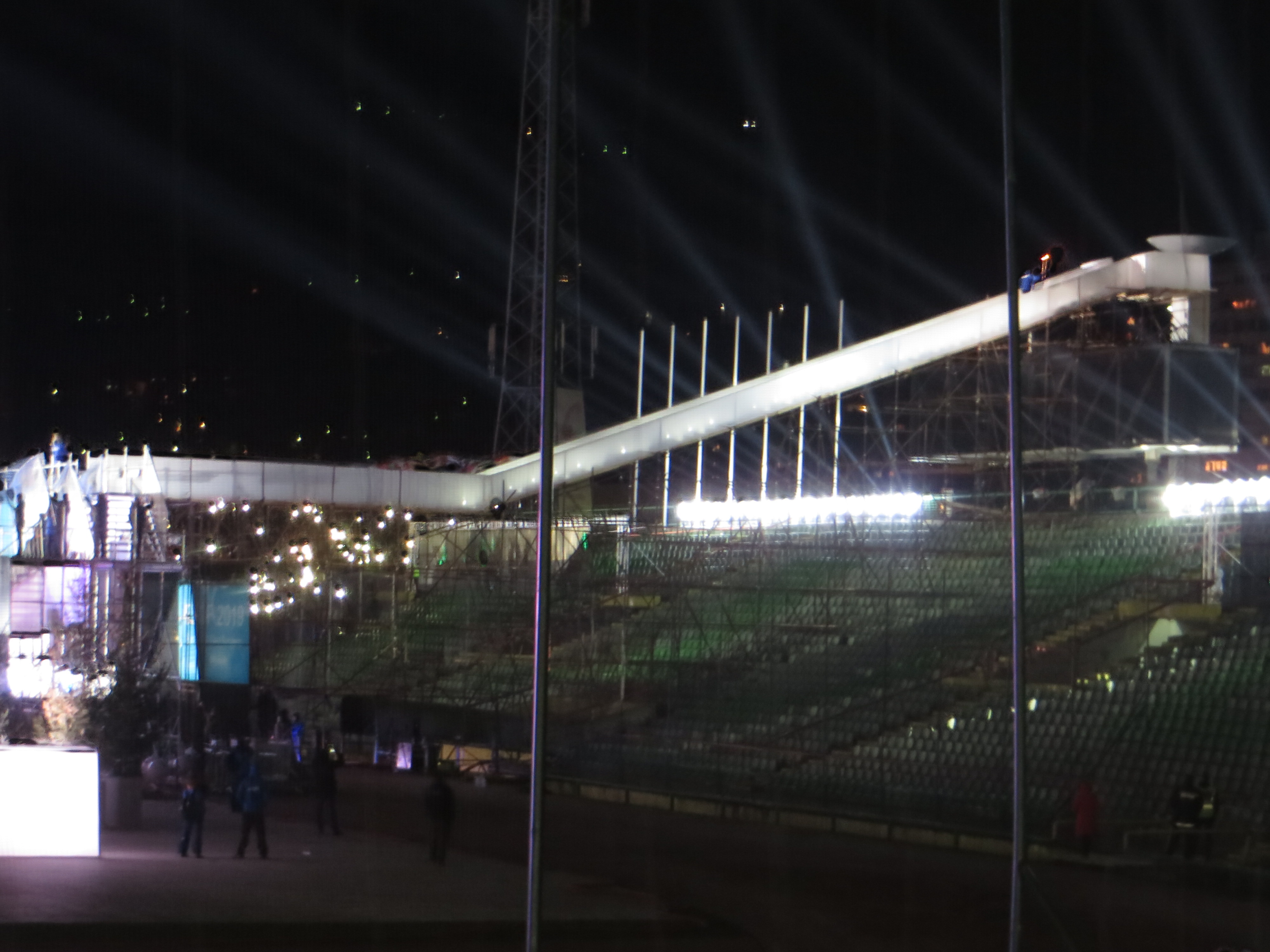
Larisa Cerić at the stairs that led to the flame

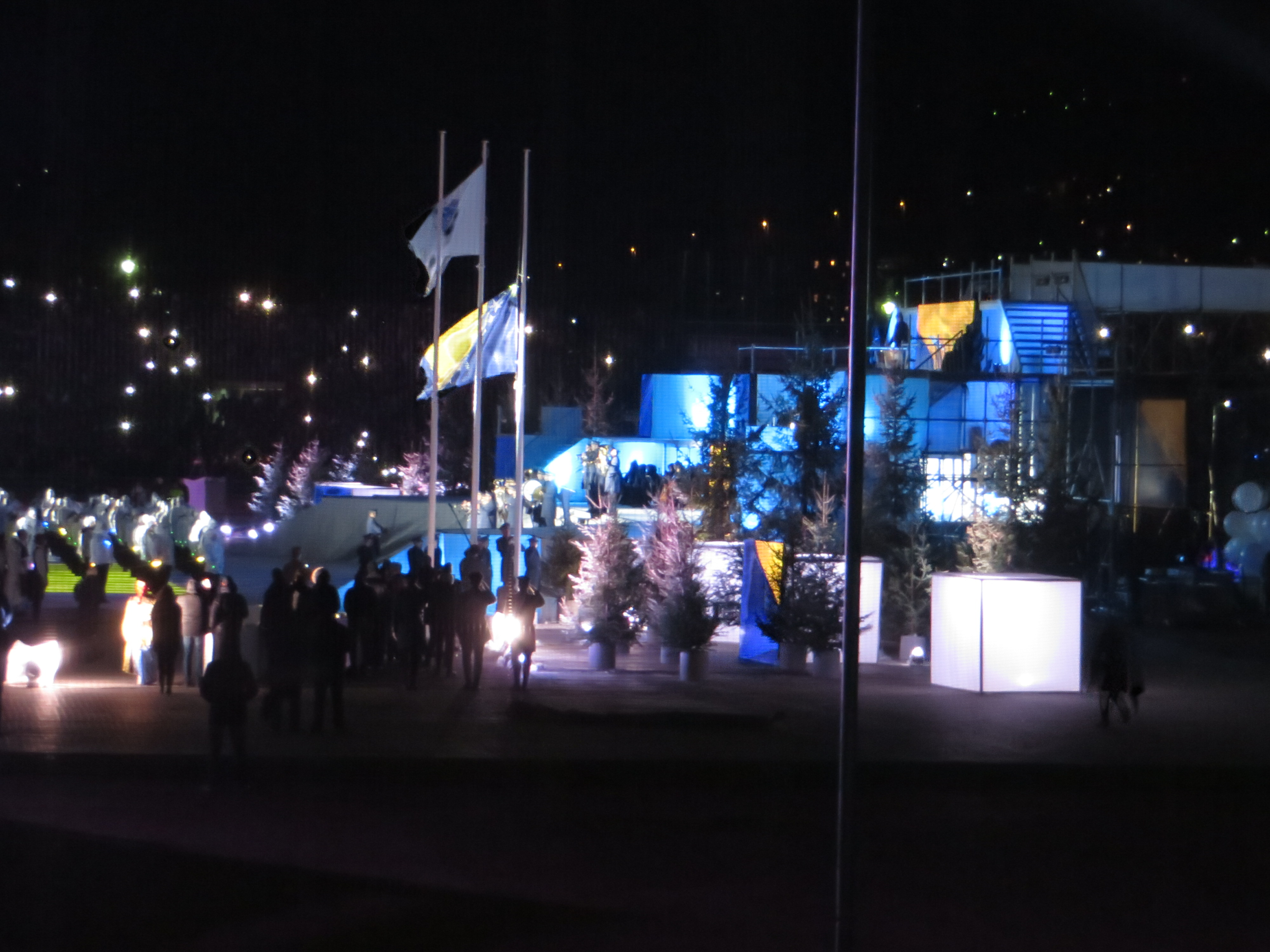
Main stage

== Mascot ==
The official mascot of the EYOF 2019 was Groodvy, created by the Visia Agency from Istočno Sarajevo, and selected after all the votes of fans from social networks. Other proposed mascots were Jezos and Jazzy. The name Groodvy comes from the word grudva which in Bosnian and Serbian language means snowball.

== Medals ==
Medals have irregular shape and represents a snowball that has engraved EYOF marks on either side. Medal award ceremonies were organized daily from 7.30 pm on a specially played floor in the area between the Hills Hotel and the Termal Riviera in Ilidža.

== Official song ==
On 16 January 2019 the official song "Za pravu raju" of the event was presented in Zetra Olympic Hall. At this occasion, Vučko, mascot of the 1984 Winter Olympics, handed "the key of fame and success" to Groodvy as stated by the mayor of Sarajevo, Abdulah Skaka. The song is performed by Elvir Laković Laka, Mirela Laković and Tarik Tanović.

== The Flame of peace ==
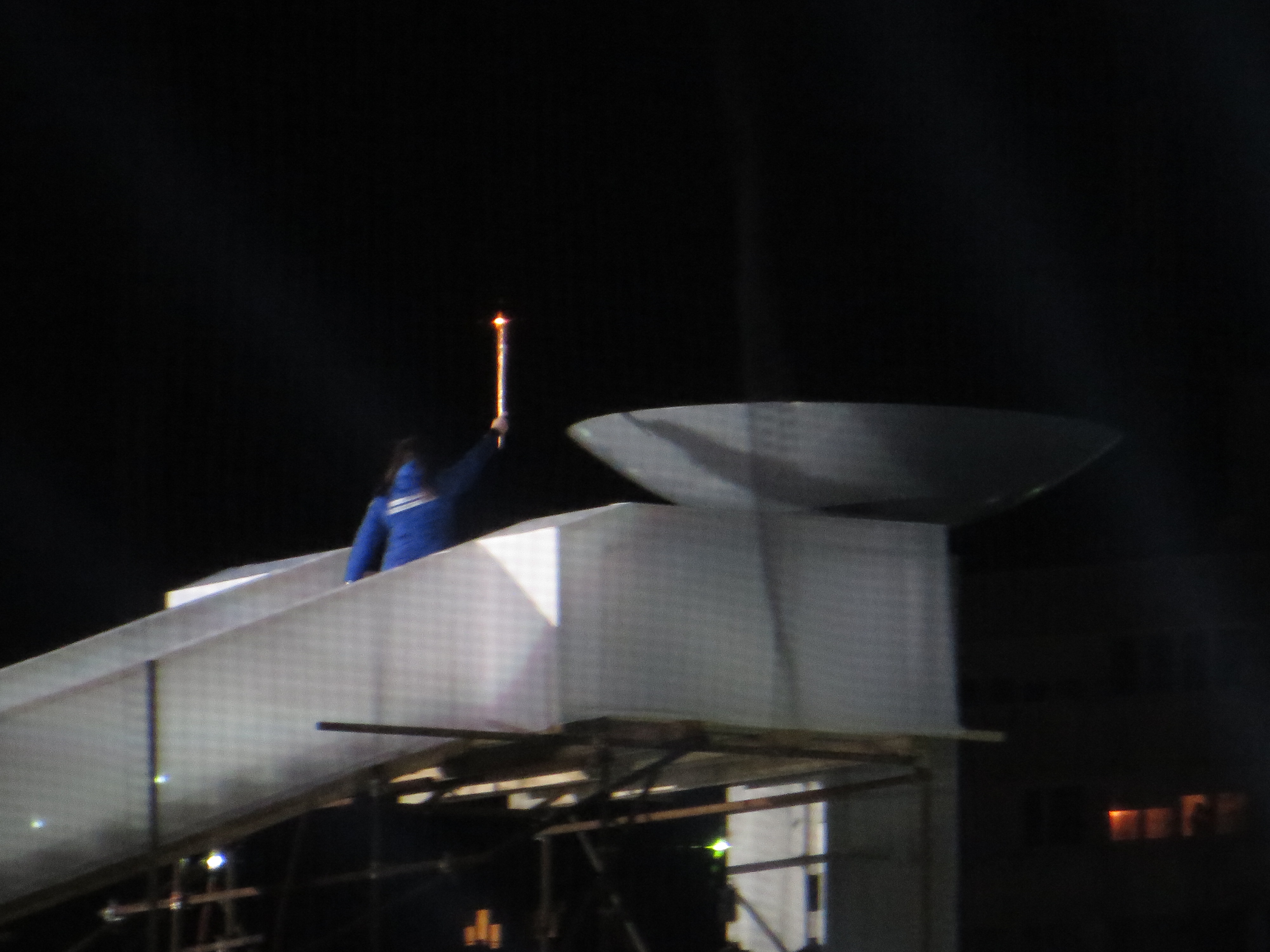
The Flame of peace ready to be lit at the opening ceremony by Larisa Cerić

Flame of Peace was lit at Stadio Olimpico in Rome on 31 January 2019, after which it started its travel to Bosnia and Herzegovina. The first stop of the flame was in Banja Luka on 1 February 2019. After Banja Luka, the flame was brought to Sarajevo International Airport on 2 February 2019 on board an aircraft of the FlyBosnia company, that had special livery for this EYOF.

During the opening ceremony, the flame of peace was carried by several famous Bosnian sports people, and on the final stage, the flame was carried by Mirsad Fazlagić, Svetlana Kitić, Ajdin Pašović, Nedžad Fazlija, Mirza Teletović, Žana Novaković, Aleksandra Samardžić and Larisa Cerić as the last person who lit the flame on the stadium.

== Media ==
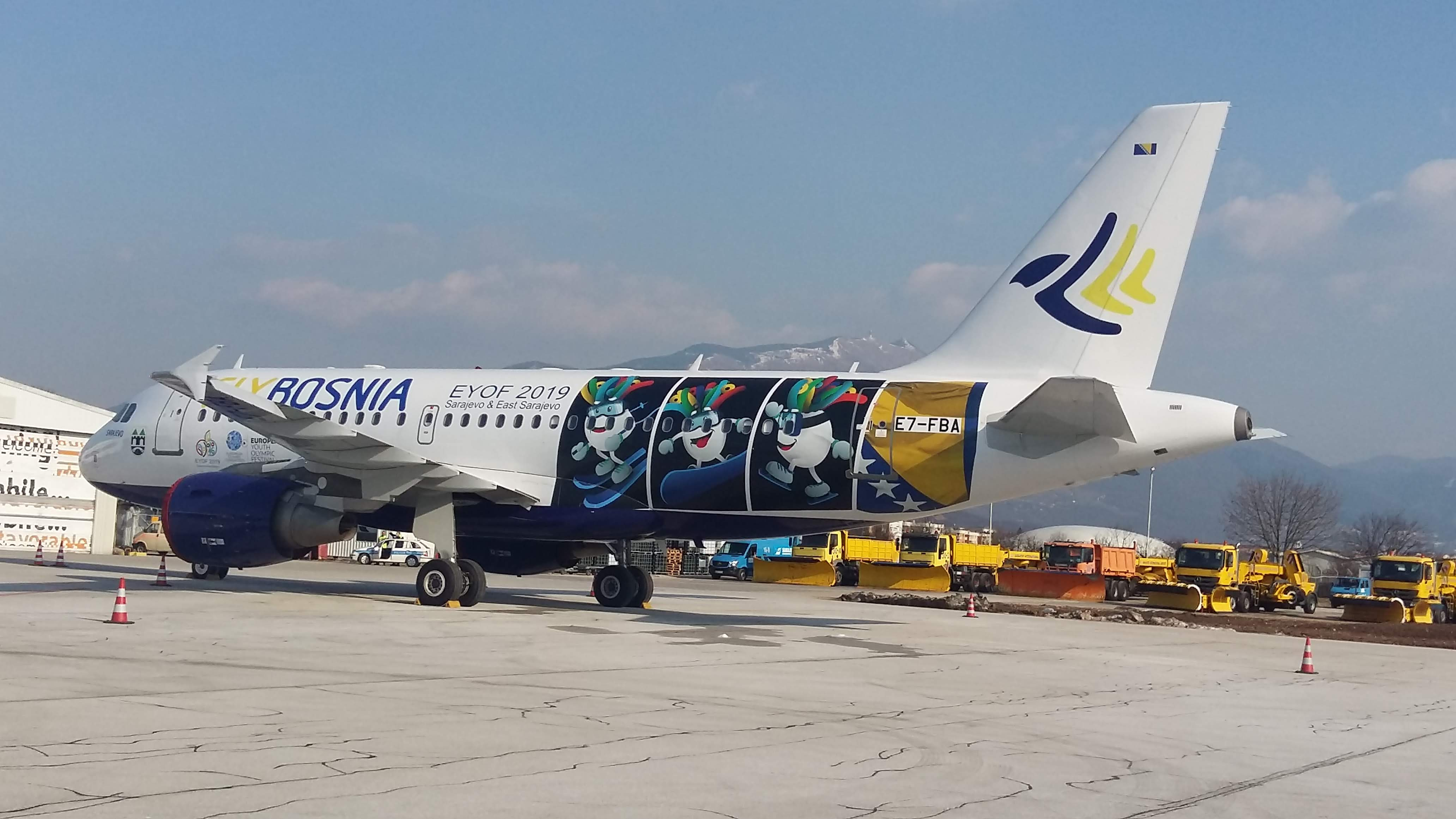
FlyBosnia aircraft with EYOF 2019 livery

The opening ceremony in Bosnia and Herzegovina was broadcast on BHT 1 and Hayat TV.

Two postal service companies from Bosnia and Herzegovina, BH Pošta and Pošte Srpske, for this occasion issued promotional postal stamps and FDC to commemorate this event.

== Closing ceremony ==
The closing ceremony was held in front of the town administration of Istočno Sarajevo on 15 February 2019. During the closing ceremony, Miligram and Van Gogh, two musical groups from Serbia performed.

The event was officially closed by Milorad Dodik, and the Olympic flag was officially handed to the mayor of Vuokatti, the host town of the next European Youth Olympic Winter Festival, which was held in 2021.
