= Margrethe Bergane =

Norwegian cross-country skier

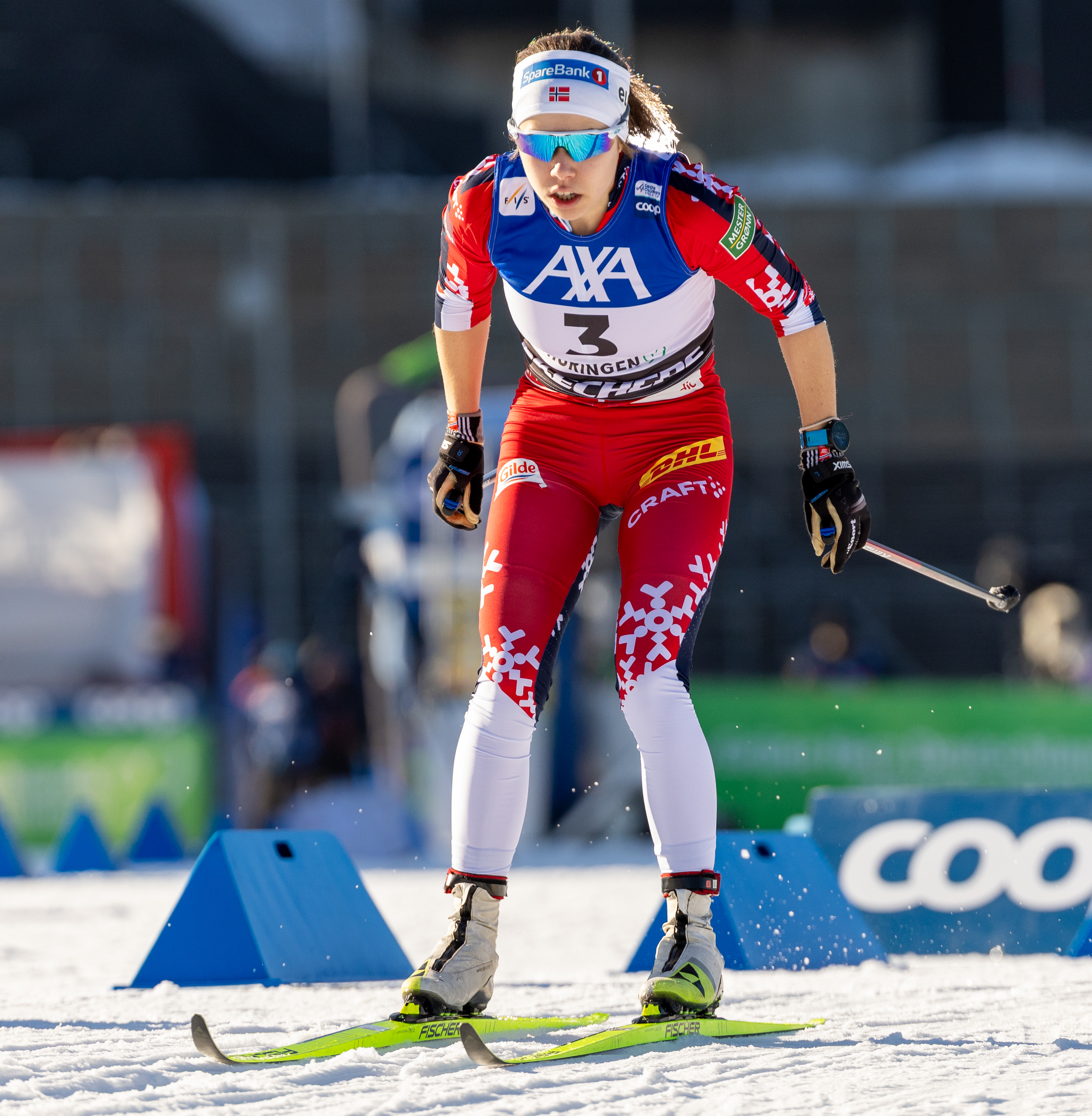

Personal information
- Nationality: Norway
- Born: 24 June 2001 (age 25)

Sport
- Sport: Skiing
- Club: Konnerud IL

World Cup career
- Seasons: 3 – (2022–present)
- Indiv. starts: 30
- Indiv. podiums: 0
- Indiv. wins: 0
- Team starts: 3
- Team podiums: 1
- Team wins: 0
- Overall titles: 0 – (42th in 2023)
- Discipline titles: 0
Medal record
Women's cross-country skiing
Representing Norway
U23 World Championships
Bronze medal – third place	2023 Whistler	20 km classical
Bronze medal – third place	2023 Whistler	10 km freestyle
Junior World Championships
Gold medal – first place	2021 Vuokatti	15 km classical
Bronze medal – third place	2021 Vuokatti	5 km freestyle
Bronze medal – third place	2021 Vuokatti	4 × 3.3 km relay
- Updated on 11 February 2024

Margrethe Bergane (born 24 June 2001) is a Norwegian cross-country skier representing Konnerud Idrettslag and Team Norconsult. She debuted in World Cup during season 2021–22

At the 2021 Junior World Ski Championships, she won the gold medal in the individual 15 km classical mass start, as well as bronze in both the 5 km freestyle and the relay.

During the 2022 Norwegian Ski Championships in Harstad, she competed for the Konnerud IL team that took bronze in the 3 x 5 km relay. She also claimed silver in the 30 km freestyle, finishing 3:50 behind the winner, Therese Johaug.

On 12 March 2023, she achieved what was then her career-best World Cup result, finishing sixth in the first-ever women's 50 km race held at Holmenkollen.

She won the U23 World Cup overall title for the 2023/24 season.

== Cross-country skiing results ==
All results are sourced from the International Ski Federation (FIS).

=== World Cup ===
==== Season standings ====
Season	Age	Discipline standings				Ski Tour standings
Season	Age	Overall	Distance	Sprint	U23	Tour de Ski
2022	20	114	83	—	24	—
2023	21	42	21	NC	2nd place, silver medalist(s)	26
2024	22	24	17	NC	1	15

==== Team podiums ====
- 1 podium – (1 RL)

No.	Season	Date	Location	Race	Level	Place	Teammate(s)
1	2023–24	26 January 2024	Goms, Switzerland	4 × 5 km Mixed Relay C/F	World Cup	3rd	Nyenget / Krüger / T. U. Weng
