= Eetu Liukas =

Finnish ice hockey player (born 2002)

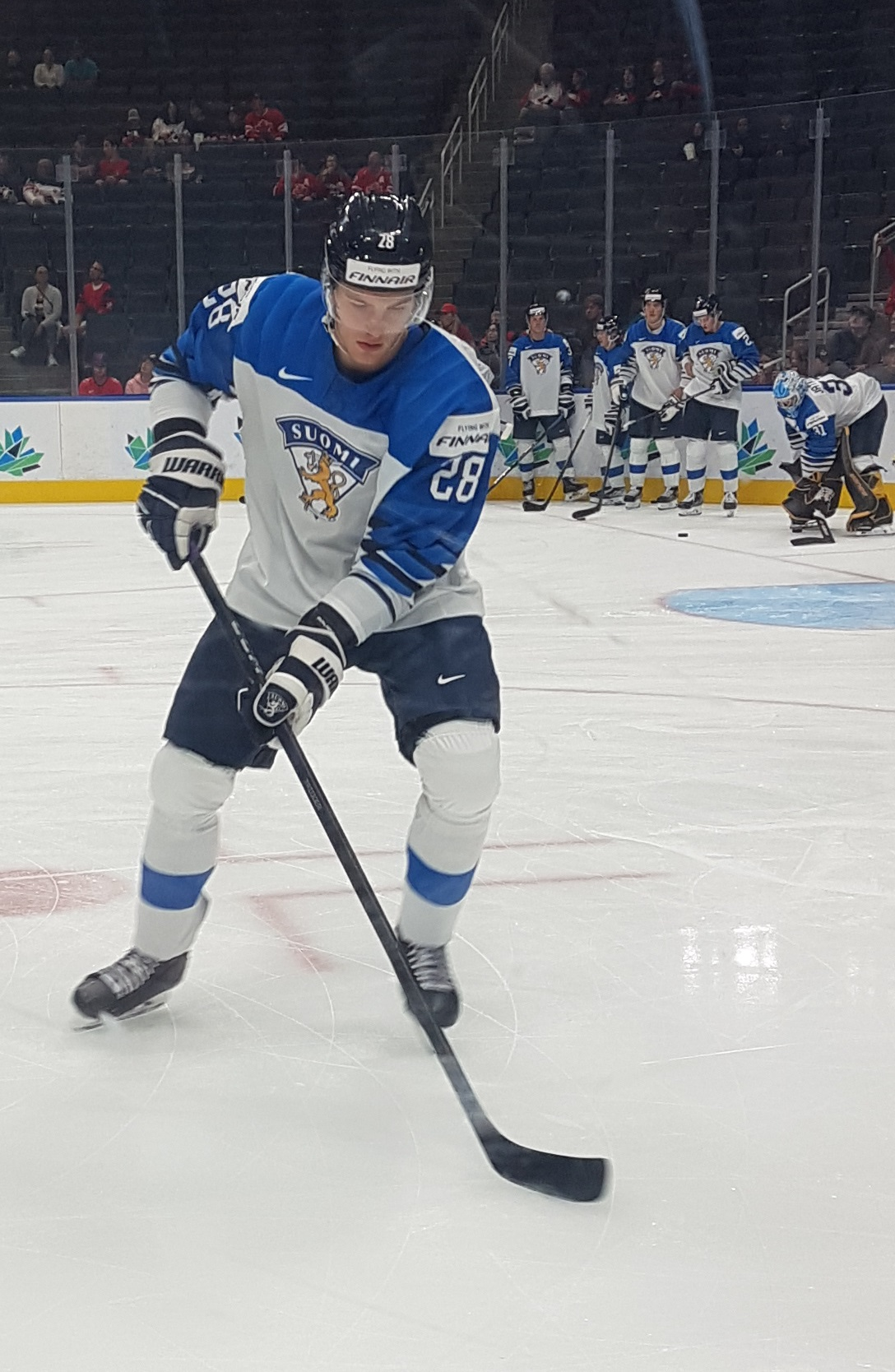
- Liukas at the 2022 World Junior Championships
- Born: 25 September 2002 (age 23) Kaarina, Finland
- Height: 6 ft 3 in (191 cm)
- Weight: 203 lb (92 kg; 14 st 7 lb)
- Position: Winger
- Shoots: Left
- Liiga team Former teams: HIFK; TPS; HPK
- NHL draft: 157th overall, 2021; New York Islanders
- Playing career: 2019–present

Eetu Liukas (born 25 September 2002) is a Finnish professional ice hockey player who is a winger for HIFK of the Finnish Liiga. He was selected 157th overall in the 2021 NHL entry draft by the New York Islanders.

== Playing career ==
Liukas first played in Liiga with TPS during the 2019–20 season, appearing in three regular season games. In the following 2020–21 season, Liukas played predominately in the Liiga, posting three points through 19 games. He was selected in the fifth round, 157th overall, by the New York Islanders of the 2021 NHL entry draft.

In his third season with TPS in 2021–22, Liukas posted new career bests of eight goals and 12 points in 48 regular season games. He featured in 17 playoff contests, notching four goals.

On 4 May 2022, Liukas opted to leave TPS, in signing a two-year contract with fellow Liiga club, HPK.

Following the completion of his first season with HPK, Liukas was signed to a three-year, entry-level contract by the New York Islanders on 7 June 2023.

Upon completion of his contract with the Islanders at the end of the 2025–26 season, Liukas returned to Liiga and signed a two-year contract with HIFK on 6 May 2026.

== Career statistics ==
=== Regular season and playoffs ===
			Regular season					Playoffs
Season	Team	League	GP	G	A	Pts	PIM	GP	G	A	Pts	PIM
2018–19	TPS	Jr. A	2	0	0	0	2	—	—	—	—	—
2019–20	TPS	Jr. A	47	12	14	26	47	4	1	0	1	6
2019–20	TPS	Liiga	3	0	0	0	0	—	—	—	—	—
2020–21	TPS	Jr. A	5	2	2	4	18	2	0	1	1	0
2020–21	TPS	Liiga	19	1	2	3	20	—	—	—	—	—
2021–22	TPS	Jr. A	13	10	10	20	14	—	—	—	—	—
2021–22	TPS	Liiga	48	8	4	12	24	17	4	0	4	4
2022–23	HPK	Liiga	58	14	9	23	104	—	—	—	—	—
2023–24	Bridgeport Islanders	AHL	47	3	4	7	34	—	—	—	—	—
2024–25	Bridgeport Islanders	AHL	52	6	5	11	37	—	—	—	—	—
2025–26	Bridgeport Islanders	AHL	24	4	6	10	12	—	—	—	—	—
Liiga totals			128	23	15	38	148	17	4	0	4	4

=== International ===
Medal record

Men's ice hockey

Representing Finland

World Junior Championships
Silver medal – second place	2022 Canada	

Year	Team	Event	Result	GP	G	A	Pts	PIM
2019	Finland	HG18	4th	3	0	0	0	2
2022	Finland	WJC	2nd place, silver medalist(s)	6	0	2	2	2
Junior totals				9	0	2	2	4
