= Diana Mukhametzianova =

Russian pair skater (born 2003)

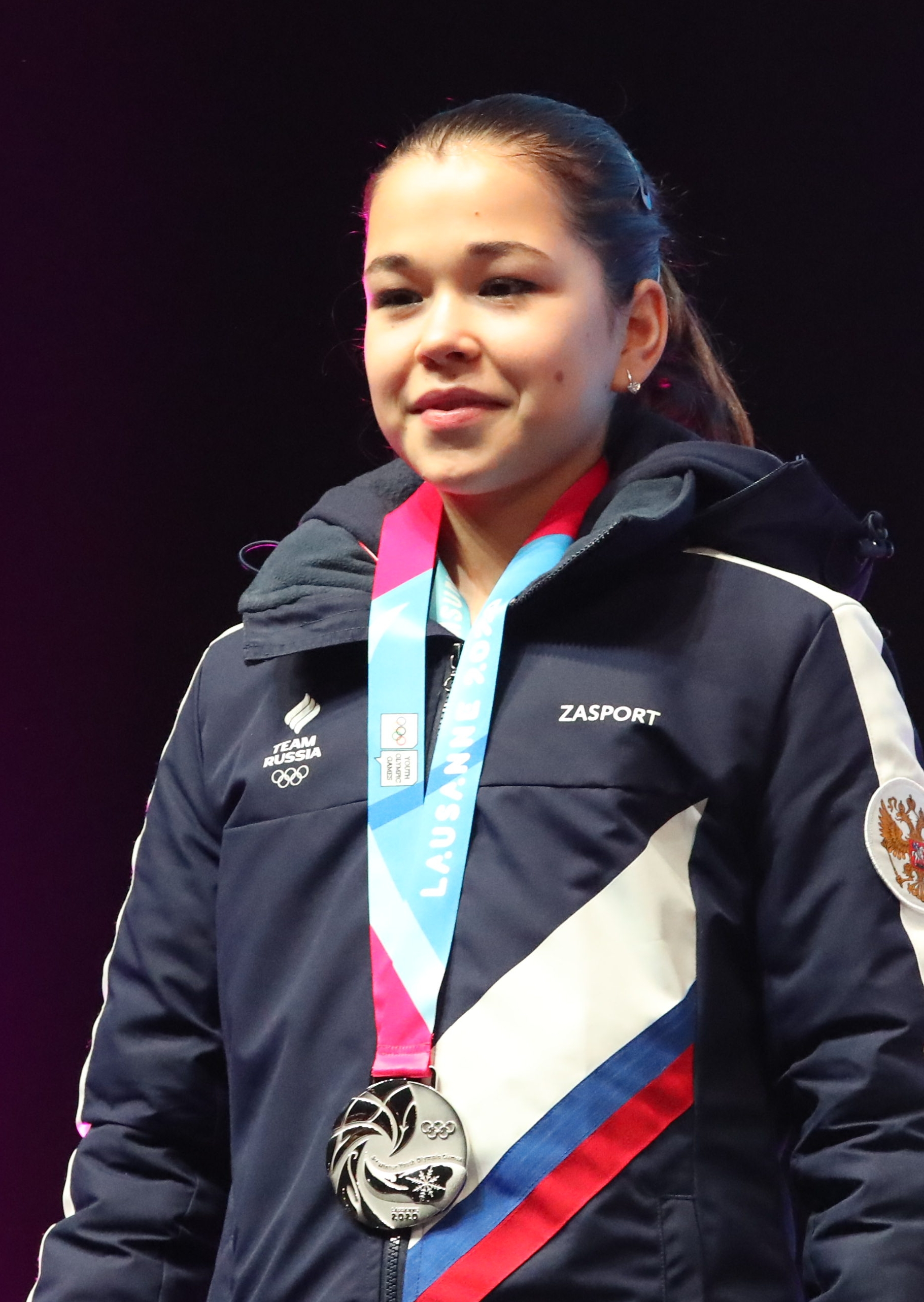
- Mukhametzianova at the 2020 Winter Youth Olympics

Personal information
- Native name: Диана Дамировна Мухаметзянова
- Full name: Diana Damirovna Mukhametzianova
- Other names: Mukhametzyanova
- Born: 18 September 2003 (age 22) Kazan, Russia
- Home town: Perm, Russia
- Height: 1.52 m (5 ft 0 in)

Figure skating career
- Country: Russia
- Began skating: 2007
- Retired: 29 August 2022
Medal record
Representing Russia
Figure skating: Pairs
Winter Youth Olympics
| Silver medal – second place | 2020 Lausanne | Pairs |
Junior Grand Prix Final
| Silver medal – second place | 2019–20 Torino | Pairs |

Diana Damirovna Mukhametzianova (Russian: Диана Дамировна Мухаметзянова, born 18 September 2003) is a retired Russian pair skater. With her former partner, Ilya Mironov, she is the 2020 Winter Youth Olympic silver medalist and the 2019–20 Junior Grand Prix Final silver medalist.

== Personal life ==
Mukhametzianova was born on 18 September 2003 in Kazan, Russia.

== Career ==
=== Early years ===
Mukhametzianova began learning how to skate in 2007. She competed as a single skater in her native Kazan until the 2017–18 season, after which she teamed up with her current partner, Ilya Mironov. For their first two seasons together, Mukhametzianova/Mironov only competed domestically, and finished 6th at the 2019 Russian Junior Figure Skating Championships.

=== 2019–20 season: Winter Youth Olympic and JGP Final silver medalists ===
Mukhametzianova/Mironov made their junior international debut at the 2019 JGP Russia. They placed third at the event behind fellow Russian competitors Kseniia Akhanteva / Valerii Kolesov and Iuliia Artemeva / Mikhail Nazarychev. At their second assignment, the 2019 JGP Croatia, the team placed second, again behind teammates Artemeva/Nazarychev, and with 24 qualifying points advanced a spot to the 2019–20 Junior Grand Prix Final. The pair competed once more before the Final, earning a silver medal in the junior event at the 2019 Volvo Open Cup behind Apollinariia Panfilova / Dmitry Rylov.

At the 2019–20 Junior Grand Prix Final, Mukhametzianova/Mironov delivered two clean programs to win the silver medal behind Panfilova/Rylov. The team won the free skate, but were unable to fully make up the margin set by the gold medalists in the short program. They set personal bests in all segments of competition at the event.

Despite qualifying, Mukhametzianova/Mironov elected to sit out of the 2020 Russian Figure Skating Championships due to fatigue from the Junior Grand Prix Final. They next competed at the 2020 Winter Youth Olympics, where they again finished second behind Panfilova/Rylov. At the 2020 Russian Junior Figure Skating Championships, Mukhametzianova/Mironov finished just off the podium in fourth and as such narrowly missed being named to the 2020 World Junior Figure Skating Championships.

=== 2020–21 season: Struggles and end of partnership with Mironov ===
Due to the COVID-19 pandemic, Mukhametzianova/Mironov, like many Russian skaters, solely competed domestically during the 2020–21 season. They qualified to the 2021 Russian Figure Skating Championships through the domestic Cup of Russia series, and finished 11th at nationals. At the end of the season, coach Nina Mozer decided to split Mukhametzianova and Mironov in favor of pairing them with new partners. In an interview with Match TV in November 2021, Mukhametzianova stated that she'd been struggling with weight fluctuations due to puberty throughout the season. Mukhametzianova eventually lost the support of her coaches after her next partnership with Vladislav Antonyshev failed to produce results and her difficulty losing weight persisted, and she ultimately left the training group. Antonyshev was partnered with former single skater Elizaveta Osokina.

=== 2021–22 season and retirement ===
Mukhametzianova began training under coach Pavel Sliusarenko in Perm in October 2021 without a partner. It became known that she left Sliusarenko's coaching group in July 2022. On the 29th of August 2022, Mukhametzianova's mother announced her daughter's retirement from the sport on her Instagram page, citing repeated emotional abuse during Mukhametzianova's career as the main reason for her retirement.

== Programs ==
=== With Mironov ===
| Season | Short program | Free skating | Exhibition |
|---|---|---|---|
| 2020–2021 | Theme from Cheburashka performed by Vladimir and Anton Jablokov | Endgame (from Chess) by Benny Andersson and Björn Ulvaeus choreo. by Tatiana Druchinina | |
| 2019–2020 | Csárdás by Vittorio Monti choreo. by Tatiana Druchinina; Crack of Doom by The Tiger Lillies choreo. by Tatiana Druchinina | Endgame (from Chess) by Benny Andersson and Björn Ulvaeus choreo. by Tatiana Druchinina | |
| 2018—2019 | Csárdás by Vittorio Monti choreo. by Tatiana Druchinina | Apologize by Timbaland and OneRepublic; Smells Like Teen Spirit performed by David Garrett | |

== Competitive highlights ==
JGP: Junior Grand Prix

=== With Mironov ===
International: Junior
| Event | 18–19 | 19–20 | 20–21 |
|---|---|---|---|
| Youth Olympics | | 2nd | |
| JGP Final | | 2nd | |
| JGP Croatia | | 2nd | |
| JGP Russia | | 3rd | |
| Volvo Open Cup | | 2nd | |
National
| Russian Champ. | | | 11th |
| Russian Jr. Champ. | 6th | 4th | |
TBD = Assigned; WD = Withdrew

== Detailed results ==
Small medals for short and free programs awarded only at ISU Championships.

With Mironov

2020–21 season
| Date | Event | Level | SP | FS | Total |
| 23–27 December 2020 | 2021 Russian Championships | Senior | 11; 60.96 | 11; 112.24 | 11; 173.20 |
2019–20 season
| 4–8 February 2020 | 2020 Russian Junior Championships | Junior | 4; 70.94 | 5; 120.67 | 4; 191.61 |
| 10–15 January 2020 | 2020 Winter Youth Olympics | Junior | 2; 60.45 | 2; 114.97 | 2; 175.42 |
| 4–8 December 2019 | 2019–20 Junior Grand Prix Final | Junior | 3; 64.90 | 1; 119.47 | 2; 184.37 |
| 5–10 November 2019 | 2019 Volvo Open Cup | Junior | 5; 53.04 | 2; 105.34 | 2; 158.38 |
| 25–28 September 2019 | 2019 JGP Croatia | Junior | 1; 63.70 | 2; 113.88 | 2; 177.58 |
| 11–14 September 2019 | 2019 JGP Russia | Junior | 3; 63.04 | 3; 108.84 | 3; 171.88 |
2018–19 season
| 1–4 February 2019 | 2019 Russian Junior Championships | Junior | 6; 60.23 | 5; 116.03 | 6; 176.26 |
