= Ilya Mironov =

Russian pair skater (born 2001)

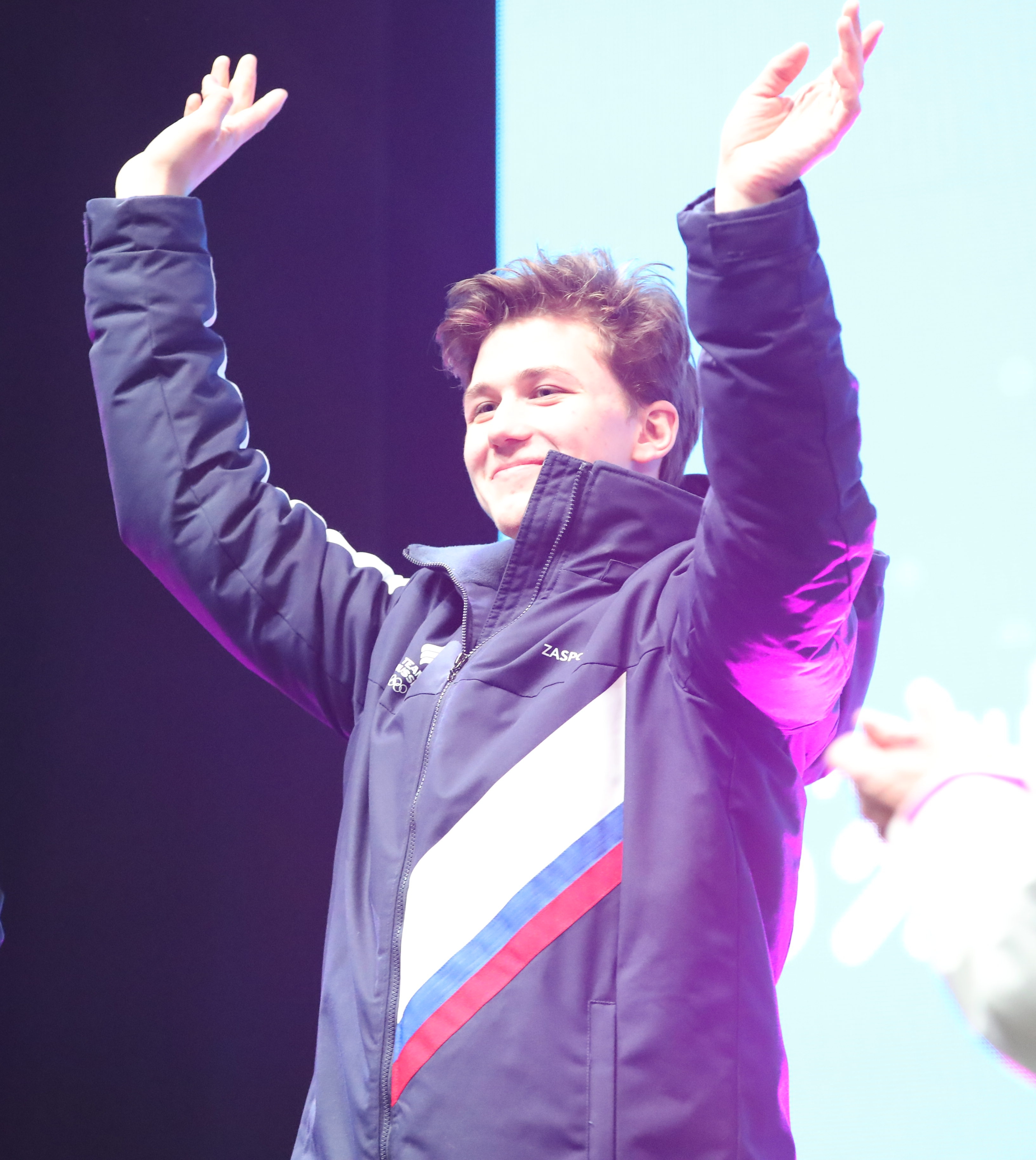
- Mironov at the 2020 Winter Youth Olympics

Personal information
- Native name: Илья Михайлович Миронов
- Full name: Ilya Mikhailovich Mironov
- Other names: Ilia
- Born: 17 April 2001 (age 25) Moscow, Russia
- Home town: Moscow, Russia
- Height: 1.79 m (5 ft 10 1/2 in)

Figure skating career
- Country: Russia
- Partner: Yasmina Kadyrova
- Coach: Vladislav Zhovnirski; Filip Tarasov; Arina Ushakova
- Skating club: Vorobievye Gory Moscow
- Began skating: 2005
Medal record
Representing Russia
Figure skating: Pairs
Winter Youth Olympics
| Silver medal – second place | 2020 Lausanne | Pairs |
Junior Grand Prix Final
| Silver medal – second place | 2019–20 Torino | Pairs |

Ilya Mikhailovich Mironov (Russian: Илья Михайлович Миронов; born 17 April 2001) is a Russian pair skater. He and his former skating partner, Diana Mukhametzianova, were the 2020 Winter Youth Olympic silver medalists and the 2019–20 Junior Grand Prix Final silver medalists.

== Personal life ==
Mironov was born on 17 April 2001 in Moscow, Russia.

== Career ==
=== Early years ===
Mironov began learning how to skate in 2005. He competed internationally as a single skater on the junior level from the 2014–15 figure skating season through the 2017–18 season, after which he switched to pairs and teamed up with his current partner, Diana Mukhametzianova. For their first two seasons together, Mukhametzianova/Mironov only competed domestically, and finished 6th at the 2019 Russian Junior Figure Skating Championships.

=== 2019–20 season: Winter Youth Olympic and JGP Final silver medalists ===
Mukhametzianova/Mironov made their junior international debut at the 2019 JGP Russia. They placed third at the event behind fellow Russian competitors Kseniia Akhanteva / Valerii Kolesov and Iuliia Artemeva / Mikhail Nazarychev. At their second assignment, the 2019 JGP Croatia, the team placed second, again behind teammates Artemeva/Nazarychev, and with 24 qualifying points advanced a spot to the 2019–20 Junior Grand Prix Final. The pair competed once more before the Final, earning a silver medal in the junior event at the 2019 Volvo Open Cup behind Apollinariia Panfilova / Dmitry Rylov.

At the 2019–20 Junior Grand Prix Final, Mukhametzianova/Mironov delivered two clean programs to win the silver medal behind Panfilova/Rylov. The team won the free skate, but were unable to fully make up the margin set by the gold medalists in the short program. They set personal bests in all segments of competition at the event.

Despite qualifying, Mukhametzianova/Mironov elected to sit out of the 2020 Russian Figure Skating Championships due to fatigue from the Junior Grand Prix Final. They next competed at the 2020 Winter Youth Olympics, where they again finished second behind Panfilova/Rylov. At the 2020 Russian Junior Figure Skating Championships, Mukhametzianova/Mironov finished just off the podium in fourth and as such narrowly missed being named to the 2020 World Junior Figure Skating Championships.

== Programs ==
=== With Mukhametzianova ===
| Season | Short program | Free skating | Exhibition |
|---|---|---|---|
| 2020–2021 | Theme from Cheburashka performed by Vladimir and Anton Jablokov | Endgame (from Chess) by Benny Andersson and Björn Ulvaeus choreo. by Tatiana Druchinina | |
| 2019–2020 | Csárdás by Vittorio Monti choreo. by Tatiana Druchinina; Crack of Doom by The Tiger Lillies choreo. by Tatiana Druchinina | Endgame (from Chess) by Benny Andersson and Björn Ulvaeus choreo. by Tatiana Druchinina | |
| 2018–2019 | Csárdás by Vittorio Monti choreo. by Tatiana Druchinina | Apologize by Timbaland and OneRepublic; Smells Like Teen Spirit performed by David Garrett | |

== Competitive highlights ==
JGP: Junior Grand Prix

=== With Kadyrova ===
National
| Event | 24–25 |
|---|---|
| Russian Champ. | 6th |

=== With Geynish ===
International: Junior
| Event | 21–22 |
|---|---|
| Budapest Trophy | 1st J |
National
| Russian Champ. | 11th |
| Russian Junior | 5th |
J = Junior; TBD = Assigned; WD = Withdrew

=== With Mukhametzianova ===
International: Junior
| Event | 18–19 | 19–20 | 20–21 |
|---|---|---|---|
| Youth Olympics | | 2nd | |
| JGP Final | | 2nd | |
| JGP Croatia | | 2nd | |
| JGP Russia | | 3rd | |
| Volvo Open Cup | | 2nd J | |
National
| Russian Champ. | | | 11th |
| Russian Jr. Champ. | 6th | 4th | |
J = Junior; TBD = Assigned; WD = Withdrew

=== As a single skater ===
International: Junior
| Event | 14–15 | 15–16 | 16–17 |
|---|---|---|---|
| Bavarian Open | 6th J | | |
| Ice Star | 5th J | | |
| Mentor Torun Cup | | 2nd J | 2nd J |
| NRW Trophy | | | 3rd J |
| Tallinn Trophy | 4th J | | |
J = Junior

== Detailed results ==
Small medals for short and free programs awarded only at ISU Championships.

=== With Geynish ===
2020–21 season
| Date | Event | Level | SP | FS | Total |
| 18–22 January 2022 | 2022 Russian Junior Championships | Junior | 5; 68.30 | | |
| 21–26 December 2021 | 2022 Russian Championships | Senior | 11; 65.78 | 11; 110.55 | 11; 176.33 |
| 14–17 October 2021 | 2021 Budapest Trophy | junior | 2; 55.98 | 1; 105.06 | 1; 161.04 |

=== With Mukhametzianova ===
2020–21 season
| Date | Event | Level | SP | FS | Total |
| 23–27 December 2020 | 2021 Russian Championships | Senior | 11; 60.96 | 11; 112.24 | 11; 173.20 |
2019–20 season
| 4–8 February 2020 | 2020 Russian Junior Championships | Junior | 4; 70.94 | 5; 120.67 | 4; 191.61 |
| 10–15 January 2020 | 2020 Winter Youth Olympics | Junior | 2; 60.45 | 2; 114.97 | 2; 175.42 |
| 4–8 December 2019 | 2019–20 Junior Grand Prix Final | Junior | 3; 64.90 | 1; 119.47 | 2; 184.37 |
| 5–10 November 2019 | 2019 Volvo Open Cup | Junior | 5; 53.04 | 2; 105.34 | 2; 158.38 |
| 25–28 September 2019 | 2019 JGP Croatia | Junior | 1; 63.70 | 2; 113.88 | 2; 177.58 |
| 11–14 September 2019 | 2019 JGP Russia | Junior | 3; 63.04 | 3; 108.84 | 3; 171.88 |
2018–19 season
| 1–4 February 2019 | 2019 Russian Junior Championships | Junior | 6; 60.23 | 5; 116.03 | 6; 176.26 |
