= Roman Pleshkov =

Russian pair skater

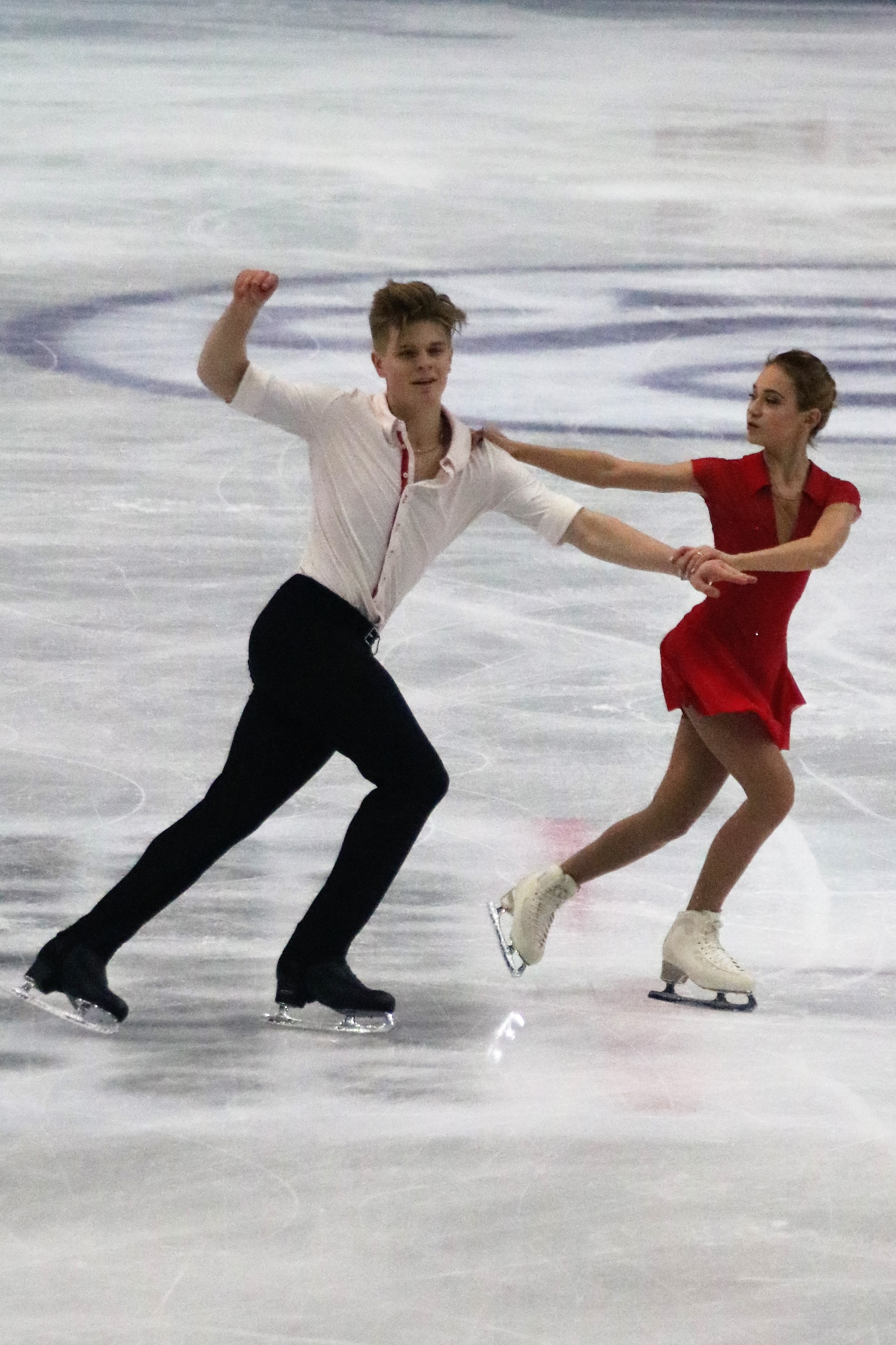
- Pepeleva/Pleshkov at the 2019–20 Junior Grand Prix Final

Personal information
- Native name: Роман Павлович Плешков
- Full name: Roman Pavlovich Pleshkov
- Born: 19 January 2000 (age 26) Yekaterinburg, Russia
- Home town: Moscow, Russia
- Height: 1.86 m (6 ft 1 in)

Figure skating career
- Country: Russia
- Coach: Nina Mozer, Vladislav Zhovnirski
- Skating club: Vorobyovy Gory SSHOR
- Began skating: 2004
- Retired: 2024

Roman Pavlovich Pleshkov (Russian: Роман Павлович Плешков, born 19 January 2000) is a retired Russian pair skater. With his former partner, Alina Pepeleva, he is the 2019 CS Warsaw Cup silver medalist. On the junior level, Pepeleva/Pleshkov are the 2019 JGP United States bronze medalists and have qualified to the 2019–20 Junior Grand Prix Final.

== Personal life ==
Pleshkov was born on 19 January 2000 in Yekaterinburg, Russia.

== Career ==
=== Early years ===
Pleshkov began learning how to skate in 2004 at the age of four. He competed as a single skater through the end of 2011–12 figure skating season, after which he teamed up with his first partner, Albina Sokur. Sokur/Pleshkov competed together domestically through the 2016–17 season but split at the end of the season. Pleshkov then teamed up with Anna Kaportseva for a season before joining forces with his current partner, Alina Pepeleva.

=== 2018–19 season ===
Pepeleva/Pleshkov competed at their first international assignment, 2019 JGP Austria, in August 2018. The team placed fourth in the short program and third in the free skate to win the bronze medal overall behind Russian teammates Polina Kostiukovich / Dmitrii Ialin and Anastasia Poluianova / Dmitry Sopot. Despite their podium finish, Pepeleva/Pleshkov did not receive a second JGP assignment but instead went on to win gold in the junior division of the 2018 Minsk-Arena Ice Star, and silver at the 2018 Russian-Chinese Winter Games.

At the 2019 Russian Junior Championships, Pepeleva/Pleshkov finished just off the podium in fourth place.

=== 2019–20 season ===
Pepeleva/Pleshkov opened their season back on the Junior Grand Prix circuit in August 2019 at the 2019 JGP United States. Despite technical errors in both the short program and the free skate, the team managed to earn the bronze medal behind fellow Russian teams Apollinariia Panfilova / Dmitry Rylov and Kseniia Akhanteva / Valerii Kolesov.

At their second assignment, 2019 JGP Poland, Pepeleva/Pleshkov were again plagued by several technical difficulties and fluke mistakes which caused them to finish off the podium in fourth place. Despite missing the podium, the team qualified for the final spot to the 2019–20 Junior Grand Prix Final based on points earned between their two assignments.

Pepeleva/Pleshkov made their senior debut in November 2019 at the 2019 CS Warsaw Cup. The team put together their cleanest programs of the season to date at the event and captured the silver medal for their efforts behind American team Jessica Calalang / Brian Johnson and ahead of Canadian team Justine Brasseur / Mark Bardei. They also set new personal bests in all three segments at this event.

At the 2020 Russian Championships, Pepeleva/Pleshkov gave two of their strongest performances of the season, placing sixth in the short program and fifth in the free skate to finish fifth overall, just ahead of junior-level rivals Panfilova/Rylov. Due to their placement in the event, Pepeleva/Pleshkov were named second alternates to the Russian team for the 2020 European Championships.

=== 2020–21 season ===
Pepeleva/Pleshkov opened their first fully senior season at the third event of the domestic Russian Cup series in Sochi, the qualifying competition series to the 2021 Russian Figure Skating Championships. They placed third in both the short program and the free skate to finish third overall behind teammates Daria Pavliuchenko / Denis Khodykin and Iuliia Artemeva / Mikhail Nazarychev. At their next event, the fourth stage of the Russian Cup held in Kazan, they placed sixth in both the short and free programs to finish sixth overall.

The team was scheduled to compete at the 2020 Rostelecom Cup in November but were forced to withdraw from the competition after one of their coaches contracted COVID-19. They subsequently competed at the 2021 Russian Championships, placing ninth.

On 26 February 2021, it was announced by Russian media outlet R-Sport that Pepeleva/Pleshkov were one of the new teams famed pairs coach Nina Mozer was taking on in her return to active coaching after a three-year hiatus.

=== 2021–22 season ===
Pepeleva/Pleshkov made their senior Grand Prix debut at the 2021 Skate America, where they placed sixth in both segments of competition to finish sixth overall.

== Programs ==
=== With Boyarintseva ===
Season	Short program	Free skating
2023-2024	Anna's Appassionata (from The K2) by Park Jung-eun	A Taste of Elegance; The Path of Silence by Anne-Sophie Versnaeyen and Gabriel Saban; Winter (from The Four Seasons) by Antonio Vivaldi performed by 2Cellos
2022-2023	Spartacus by Aram Khachaturian	The Firebird by Igor Stravinsky

=== With Pepeleva ===
Season	Short program	Free skating
2021–2022	Io Ci Sarò performed by Andrea Bocelli and Lang Lang choreo. by Tatiana Druchinina and Ramil Mekhidiev	Melody (from Orfeo ed Euridice) by Christoph Willibald Gluck performed by The duet I
2020–2021	L-O-V-E performed by Michael Bublé	Melody (from Orfeo ed Euridice) by Christoph Willibald Gluck performed by The duet I
2019–2020	L-O-V-E performed by Michael Bublé	Aimer performed by Airnadette; Mort De Roméo performed by Damien Sargue; Les Rois du monde performed by Philippe d'Avilla, Damien Sargue, Grégori Baquet (from Roméo et Juliette) by Gérard Presgurvic
2018–2019	Blues for Klook by Eddy Louiss	Sous le ciel de Paris; La Vie en rose performed by Yves Montand

== Competitive highlights ==
GP: Grand Prix; CS: Challenger Series; JGP: Junior Grand Prix

=== With Boyarintseva ===
National
Event	22–23	23–24
Russian Champ.	7th	WD
Russian Cup Final (Note: The 2023 Russian Cup Final was renamed as the 2023 Russian Grand Prix Final.)	8th	
GPR Golden Skate	3rd	6th
GPR Krasnoyarye		5th
GPR Moscow Stars	3rd	

=== With Pepeleva ===
International
Event	18–19	19–20	20–21	21–22
GP Cup of China				C
GP Italy				6th
GP Rostelecom			WD	
GP Skate America				6th
CS Golden Spin				WD
CS Warsaw Cup		2nd		4th
Icelab Cup		1st		
John Nicks Challenge				5th
International: Junior
JGP Final		5th		
JGP Austria	3rd			
JGP Poland		4th		
JGP U.S.		3rd		
Ice Star	1st			
National
Russian Champ.		5th	9th	WD
Russian Junior	4th	WD		
WD = Withdrew; C = Event cancelled

=== With Kaportseva ===
National
Event	2017–18
Russian Cup Final	7th J

=== With Sokur ===
National
Event	2015–16	2016–17
Russian Junior Champ.	8th	7th
Russian Cup Final	3rd J	WD

== Detailed results ==
With Boyarintseva

2022–23 season
Date	Event	SP	FS	Total
20–26 December 2022	2023 Russian Championships	7; 74.74	7; 133.52	7; 208.26
11–14 November 2022	2022 Cup of Russia Series, 4th Stage	3; 70.21	3; 126.66	3; 196.87
21–24 October 2022	2022 Cup of Russia Series, 1st Stage	3; 73.51	3; 133.76	3; 207.27

With Pepeleva

2021–22 season
Date	Event	SP	FS	Total
November 17–20, 2021	2021 CS Warsaw Cup	2; 69.42	5; 121.51	4; 190.93
November 5–7, 2021	2021 Gran Premio d'Italia	7; 52.72	5; 109.99	6; 162.71
October 22–24, 2021	2021 Skate America	6; 64.15	6; 118.97	6; 183.12
2020–21 season
Date	Event	SP	FS	Total
26 February – 2 March 2021	2021 Russian Cup Final domestic competition	4; 65.06	4; 124.98	4; 190.04
23–27 December 2020	2021 Russian Championships	7; 65.45	10; 124.19	9; 189.64
2019–20 season
24–28 December 2019	2020 Russian Championships	6; 70.67	5; 132.90	5; 203.57
4–8 December 2019	2019–20 Junior Grand Prix Final	4; 64.67	5; 107.86	5; 172.53
14–17 November 2019	2019 CS Warsaw Cup	2; 67.06	2; 121.73	2; 188.79
1–3 November 2019	Icelab International Cup	2; 62.29	1; 112.45	1; 174.74
18–21 September 2019	2019 JGP Poland	5; 50.22	3; 100.34	4; 150.56
28–31 August 2019	2019 JGP United States	3; 55.68	3; 103.61	3; 159.29
2018–19 season
14–19 December 2018	2018 Russian-Chinese Winter Games	2; 55.61	1; 110.02	1; 165.63
18–21 October 2018	2018 Ice Star (Junior)	1; 59.72	1; 102.02	1; 161.74
29 August – 1 September 2018	2018 JGP Austria	4; 53.38	3; 105.02	3; 158.40
