= 2020 Russian Figure Skating Championships =

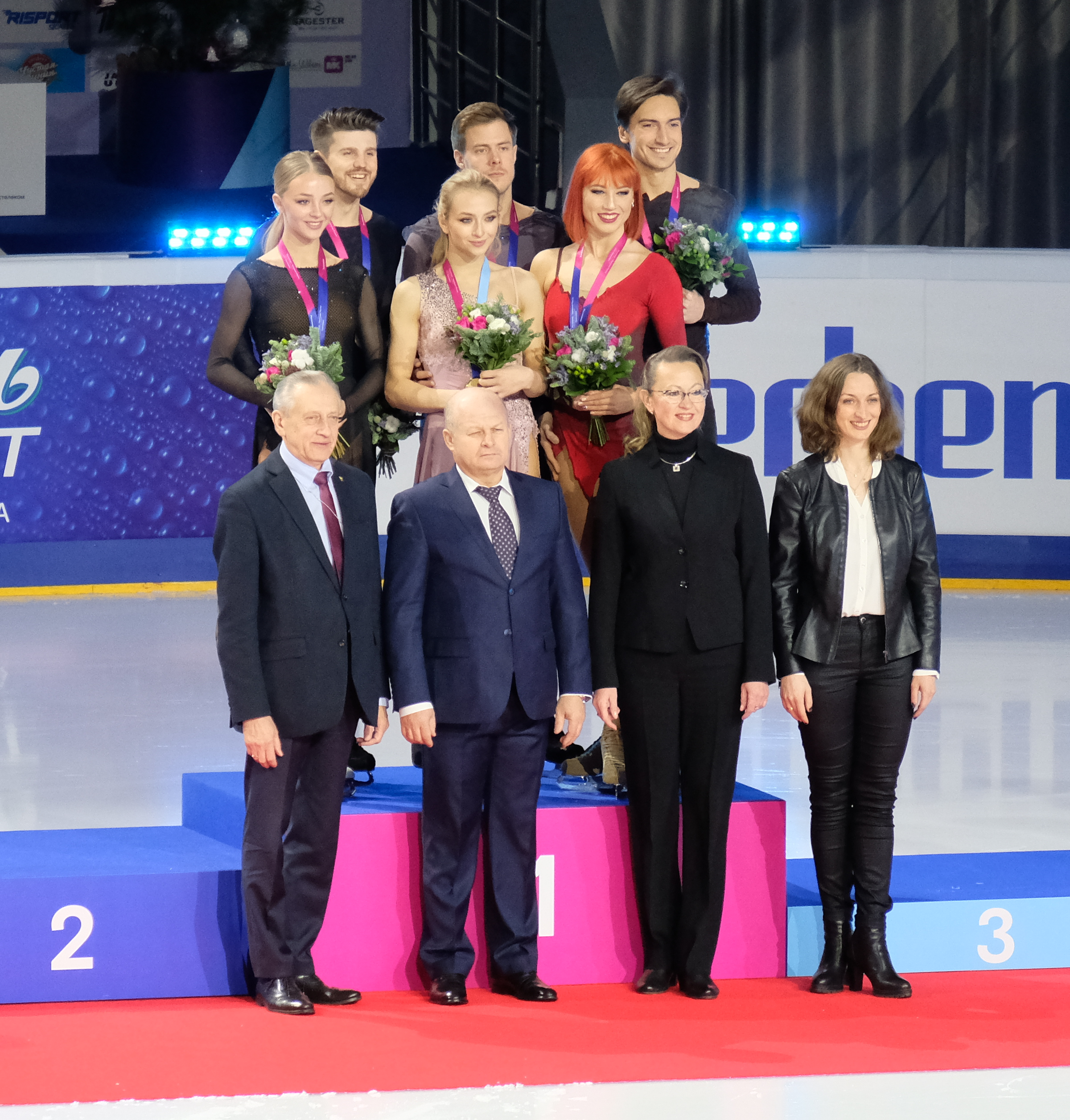
- 2020 Russian Figure Skating Championships - Ice dance podium
- Type: National championship
- Date: 24–29 December 2019 (S); 4–8 February 2020 (J)
- Season: 2019–20
- Location: Krasnoyarsk (S); Saransk (J)
- Host: Figure Skating Federation of Russia

Champions
- Men's singles: Dmitri Aliev (S); Daniil Samsonov (J)
- Ladies' singles: Anna Shcherbakova (S); Kamila Valieva (J)
- Pairs: Aleksandra Boikova / Dmitrii Kozlovskii (S); Apollinariia Panfilova / Dmitry Rylov (J)
- Ice dance: Victoria Sinitsina / Nikita Katsalapov (S); Elizaveta Shanaeva / Devid Naryzhnyy (J)
- Previous: 2019 Russian Championships
- Next: 2021 Russian Championships

The 2020 Russian Figure Skating Championships (Russian: Чемпионат России по фигурному катанию на коньках 2020) were held from 24 to 29 December 2019 in Krasnoyarsk. Medals were awarded in the disciplines of men's singles, ladies' singles, pair skating, and ice dancing. The results were among the criteria used to select the Russian teams for the 2020 European Championships and 2020 World Championships.

== Competitions ==
In the 2019–20 season, Russian skaters competed in domestic qualifying events and national championships for various age levels. The Russian Cup series led to three events – the Russian Championships, the Russian Junior Championships, and the Russian Cup Final.

Date	Event	Type	Location	Details
18–22 September 2019	1st stage of Russian Cup	Qualifier	Syzran, Samara Oblast	Details
9–13 October 2019	2nd stage of Russian Cup	Qualifier	Saransk, Mordovia	Details
29 October – 2 November 2019	3rd stage of Russian Cup	Qualifier	Sochi, Krasnodar Krai	Details
11–15 November 2019	4th stage of Russian Cup	Qualifier	Kazan, Tatarstan	Details
20–24 November 2019	5th stage of Russian Cup	Qualifier	Moscow	Details
24–29 December 2019	2020 Russian Championships	Final	Krasnoyarsk, Krasnoyarsk Krai	Details
4–8 February 2020	2020 Russian Junior Championships	Final	Saransk, Mordovia	Details
18–22 February 2020	2020 Russian Cup Final	Final	Veliky Novgorod, Novgorod Oblast	Details
11–15 March 2020	2020 Russian Youth Championships – Younger Age	Final	Tver, Tver Oblast	Details
1–3 April 2020	2020 Russian Youth Championships – Elder Age	Final	Sochi, Krasnodar Krai	Cancelled

== Medalists of most important competitions ==
Senior Championships
Discipline	Gold	Silver	Bronze
Men	Dmitri Aliev	Artur Danielian	Alexander Samarin
Ladies	Anna Shcherbakova	Alena Kostornaia	Alexandra Trusova
Pairs	Aleksandra Boikova / Dmitrii Kozlovskii	Evgenia Tarasova / Vladimir Morozov	Daria Pavliuchenko / Denis Khodykin
Ice dancing	Victoria Sinitsina / Nikita Katsalapov	Alexandra Stepanova / Ivan Bukin	Tiffany Zahorski / Jonathan Guerreiro
Junior Championships
Discipline	Gold	Silver	Bronze
Men	Daniil Samsonov	Petr Gumennik	Andrei Mozalev
Ladies	Kamila Valieva	Sofia Akateva	Daria Usacheva
Pairs	Apollinariia Panfilova / Dmitry Rylov	Kseniia Akhanteva / Valerii Kolesov	Iuliia Artemeva / Mikhail Nazarychev
Ice dancing	Elizaveta Shanaeva / Devid Naryzhnyy	Arina Ushakova / Maxim Nekrasov	Diana Davis / Gleb Smolkin
Cup Final
Discipline	Gold	Silver	Bronze
Men	Makar Ignatov	Anton Shulepov	Ilya Yablokov
Ladies	Anastasiia Guliakova	Anastasiia Gubanova	Maria Talalaikina
Pairs	Anastasia Mishina / Aleksandr Galliamov	Yasmina Kadyrova / Ivan Balchenko	Alina Pepeleva / Roman Pleshkov
Ice dancing	Anastasia Shpilevaya / Grigory Smirnov	Ekaterina Mironova / Evgenii Ustenko	Julia Tultseva / Anatoliy Belovodchenko
Junior men	Evgeni Semenenko	Artem Kovalev	Andrei Kutovoi
Junior ladies	Sofia Samodelkina	Sofia Akateva	Adeliia Petrosian
Junior pairs	Diana Mukhametzianova / Ilya Mironov	Anastasia Mukhortova / Dmitry Evgenyev	Ekaterina Petushkova / Evgenii Malikov
Junior ice dancing	Angelina Lazareva / Maksim Prokofiev	Sofia Aleksova / Ilya Vladimirov	Elizaveta Shichina / Gordey Khubulov
Youth Championships – Elder Age
Discipline	Gold	Silver	Bronze
Men	No men's discipline		
Ladies	No ladies' discipline		
Pairs	Cancelled due to the coronavirus pandemic		
Ice dancing	Cancelled due to the coronavirus pandemic		
Youth Championships – Younger Age
Discipline	Gold	Silver	Bronze
Men	Vsevolod Knyazev	Mark Lukin	Maxim Belyavsky
Ladies	Veronika Zhilina	Elizaveta Berestovskaia	Maria Dmitrieva
Pairs	No pairs' discipline		
Ice dancing	No ice dancing discipline		

== Senior Championships ==
The 2020 Russian Championships was held in Krasnoyarsk, Krasnoyarsk Krai from 24 to 29 December 2019. Competitors qualified through international success or by competing in the Russian Cup series' senior-level events.

There are three separate basis for qualification.
1. Qualification based on receiving 2019–20 Grand Prix assignment.
2. Qualification based on qualifying for the 2019–20 Junior Grand Prix Final. However, skaters must have been born in 2005 or earlier to be qualified for the Russian senior championships. In addition, junior ice dance teams do not compete at senior national championships due to different program requirements between the junior and senior levels. Consequently, ice dance teams cannot use their junior level programs for senior competition.
3. Qualification based on Russian Cup series' results.

=== Schedule ===
Listed in local time (UTC +7).

Day	Date	Start	Finish	Discipline	Event
Day 1	26 December	14:00	16:30	Men	Short program
Day 1	26 December	16:50	18:50	Ice dance	Rhythm dance
Day 1	26 December	19:15	20:00		Opening ceremony
Day 1	26 December	20:15	22:15	Pairs	Short program
Day 2	27 December	13:30	15:55	Ice dance	Free dance
Day 2	27 December	16:15	19:15	Men	Free skating
Day 2	27 December	19:30	22:00	Ladies	Short program
Day 3	28 December	16:30	18:40	Pairs	Free skating
Day 3	28 December	19:00	21:50	Ladies	Free skating
Day 4	29 December	12:00	12:45		Victory ceremonies
Day 4	29 December	13:00	15:30		Exhibition gala

=== Preliminary entries ===
Men	Ladies	Pairs	Ice dance
~~Mikhail Kolyada~~ (withdrew)	~~Alina Zagitova~~ (withdrew)	Evgenia Tarasova / Vladimir Morozov	Victoria Sinitsina / Nikita Katsalapov
Alexander Samarin	Evgenia Medvedeva	~~Natalia Zabiiako / Alexander Enbert~~ (withdrew)	Alexandra Stepanova / Ivan Bukin
Andrei Lazukin	Sofia Samodurova	Aleksandra Boikova / Dmitrii Kozlovskii	Tiffany Zahorski / Jonathan Guerreiro
Dmitri Aliev	Alexandra Trusova	Daria Pavliuchenko / Denis Khodykin	Sofia Evdokimova / Egor Bazin
Sergei Voronov	Alena Kostornaia	Anastasia Mishina / Aleksandr Galliamov	Sofia Shevchenko / Igor Eremenko
~~Roman Savosin~~ (withdrew)	Anna Shcherbakova	~~Ksenia Stolbova / Andrei Novoselov~~ (withdrew)	Anastasia Skoptsova / Kirill Aleshin
Anton Shulepov	Elizaveta Tuktamysheva	Alisa Efimova / Alexander Korovin	~~Betina Popova / Sergey Mozgov~~ (withdrew)
Makar Ignatov	Stanislava Konstantinova	Apollinariia Panfilova / Dmitry Rylov	Anastasia Shpilevaya / Grigory Smirnov
~~Artur Dmitriev Jr.~~ (withdrew)	Serafima Sakhanovich	Kseniia Akhanteva / Valerii Kolesov	Annabelle Morozov / Andrei Bagin
Andrei Mozalev	~~Maria Sotskova~~ (withdrew)	Iuliia Artemeva / Mikhail Nazarychev	Ksenia Konkina / Pavel Drozd
Petr Gumennik	Kseniia Sinitsyna	~~Diana Mukhametzianova / Ilya Mironov~~ (withdrew)	Olga Bibikhina / Daniil Zvorykin
Daniil Samsonov	~~Viktoria Vasilieva~~ (withdrew)	Alina Pepeleva / Roman Pleshkov	Julia Tultseva / Anatoliy Belovodchenko
~~Alexander Petrov~~ (withdrew)	Ksenia Tsibinova		Ekaterina Mironova / Evgenii Ustenko
Artur Danielian	~~Anastasia Tarakanova~~ (withdrew)		Elizaveta Pasechnik / Egor Kolosovskii
Vladimir Samoilov	Anastasiia Gubanova		Maria Ignatieva / Mikhail Bragin
Leonid Sviridenko	Elizaveta Nugumanova		
Egor Murashov	Anna Frolova		
Andrei Zuber	Valeria Shulskaya		
Substitutes	Substitutes	Substitutes	Substitutes
Ilya Yablokov (added)	Maria Talalaikina (added)	~~Anastasia Balabanova / Alexei Sviatchenko~~ (added, but later withdrew)	Vlada Chashnikova / Zakhar Cherezov
Gleb Luftullin (added)	Anastasiia Guliakova (added)	Taisiia Sobinina / Nikita Volodin (added)	Vlada Pavlenina / Aleksandr Aleksanyan
Vladislav Katichev (added)	Anna Sidorova	Polina Kostiukovich / Dmitrii Ialin (added)	Alena Ponomaryova / Andrei Karelin
Andrei Rud	Anastasia Gracheva (added)	Ekaterina Belova / Dmitrii Chigirev (added)	Elizaveta Kirillova / Mark Chegodaev

==== Changes to preliminary entries ====
Date	Discipline	Withdrew	Added	Reason/Other notes	Refs
3 December	Ladies	Maria Sotskova	Maria Talalaikina	Health issues	
13 December	Ladies	Alina Zagitova	Anastasiia Guliakova	Temporary suspension of sports career	
14 December	Men	Mikhail Kolyada	Ilya Yablokov	Recovery from sinusitis surgery	
14 December	Pairs	Ksenia Stolbova / Andrei Novoselov	Anastasia Balabanova / Alexei Sviatchenko	Leg injury (Novoselov)	
16 December	Men	Artur Dmitriev Jr.	Gleb Lutfullin	Health issues	
16 December	Men	Roman Savosin	Vladislav Katichev		
16 December	Pairs	Natalia Zabiiako / Alexander Enbert	Taisiia Sobinina / Nikita Volodin	Health issues (Enbert)	
16 December	Pairs	Diana Mukhametzianova / Ilya Mironov	Polina Kostiukovich / Dmitrii Ialin	Examination session (Mironov), fatigue after the 2019–20 Junior Grand Prix Final	
20 December	Ladies	Viktoria Vasilieva	Anastasia Gracheva	Joint problems	
21 December	Men	Alexander Petrov	None	Poor physical condition	
21 December	Pairs	Anastasia Balabanova / Alexei Sviatchenko	Ekaterina Belova / Dmitrii Chigirev		
23 December	Ice dance	Betina Popova / Sergey Mozgov	None	Back injury (Mozgov)	
24 December	Ladies	Anastasia Tarakanova	None	Leg injury (sprain)	

=== Results ===
==== Men ====
Rank	Name	Total points	SP		FS	
1	Dmitri Aliev	260.98	4	87.35	2	173.63
2	Artur Danielian	253.42	13	75.72	1	177.70
3	Alexander Samarin	252.74	8	80.68	3	172.06
4	Makar Ignatov	249.46	1	88.88	4	160.58
5	Andrei Mozalev	240.55	2	88.34	9	152.21
6	Daniil Samsonov	240.21	7	80.88	5	159.33
7	Petr Gumennik	238.08	3	88.06	10	150.02
8	Anton Shulepov	237.76	6	81.17	7	156.59
9	Sergei Voronov	233.82	9	79.61	8	154.21
10	Andrei Zuber	225.77	11	78.03	12	147.74
11	Ilya Yablokov	223.81	12	75.86	11	147.95
12	Andrei Lazukin	223.09	5	85.56	15	137.53
13	Leonid Sviridenko	222.79	10	78.61	14	144.18
14	Egor Murashov	221.80	14	75.00	13	146.80
15	Vladimir Samoilov	220.73	17	61.43	6	159.30
16	Vladislav Katichev	181.39	15	69.31	16	112.08
WD	Gleb Lutfullin	withdrew	16	64.74	withdrew from competition	

==== Ladies ====
Rank	Name	Total points	SP		FS	
1	Anna Shcherbakova	261.87	2	79.93	1	181.94
2	Alena Kostornaia	259.83	1	89.86	2	169.97
3	Alexandra Trusova	226.34	3	76.46	3	149.88
4	Elizaveta Tuktamysheva	204.63	4	75.74	9	128.89
5	Kseniia Sinitsyna	202.96	14	59.72	4	143.24
6	Anna Frolova	199.29	7	66.45	5	132.84
7	Anastasiia Guliakova	196.99	6	66.85	7	130.14
8	Valeria Shulskaya	194.89	8	66.17	10	128.72
9	Sofia Samodurova	192.08	11	64.38	11	127.70
10	Anastasiia Gubanova	190.06	12	60.87	8	129.19
11	Ksenia Tsibinova	189.85	15	58.94	6	130.91
12	Serafima Sakhanovich	187.40	10	65.42	12	121.98
13	Stanislava Konstantinova	180.34	9	66.00	15	114.34
14	Elizaveta Nugumanova	174.66	13	60.01	14	114.65
15	Maria Talalaikina	170.33	17	50.91	13	119.42
16	Anastasia Gracheva	169.15	16	56.47	16	112.68
WD	Evgenia Medvedeva	withdrew	5	71.08	withdrew from competition	

==== Pairs ====
Rank	Name	Total points	SP		FS	
1	Aleksandra Boikova / Dmitrii Kozlovskii	233.66	2	80.39	1	153.27
2	Evgenia Tarasova / Vladimir Morozov	233.19	1	83.91	2	149.28
3	Daria Pavliuchenko / Denis Khodykin	219.72	3	76.13	4	143.59
4	Anastasia Mishina / Aleksandr Galliamov	212.85	8	67.73	3	145.12
5	Alina Pepeleva / Roman Pleshkov	203.57	6	70.67	5	132.90
6	Apollinariia Panfilova / Dmitry Rylov	197.81	5	71.51	8	126.30
7	Iuliia Artemeva / Mikhail Nazarychev	197.49	7	68.64	7	128.85
8	Polina Kostiukovich / Dmitrii Ialin	193.73	10	64.69	6	129.04
9	Alisa Efimova / Alexander Korovin	185.97	4	72.83	10	113.14
10	Kseniia Akhanteva / Valerii Kolesov	179.61	9	67.37	11	112.24
11	Taisiia Sobinina / Nikita Volodin	173.14	11	64.25	12	108.89
12	Ekaterina Belova / Dmitrii Chigirev	171.07	12	57.47	9	113.60

==== Ice dance ====
Rank	Name	Total points	RD		FD	
1	Victoria Sinitsina / Nikita Katsalapov	220.74	1	88.43	2	132.31
2	Alexandra Stepanova / Ivan Bukin	219.72	2	87.13	1	132.59
3	Tiffany Zahorski / Jonathan Guerreiro	197.73	3	77.38	3	120.35
4	Annabelle Morozov / Andrei Bagin	189.10	5	73.67	4	115.43
5	Anastasia Skoptsova / Kirill Aleshin	186.81	4	73.98	5	112.83
6	Sofia Shevchenko / Igor Eremenko	181.67	7	70.48	6	111.19
7	Sofia Evdokimova / Egor Bazin	180.68	6	71.42	7	109.26
8	Ksenia Konkina / Pavel Drozd	176.21	9	69.04	8	107.17
9	Anastasia Shpilevaya / Grigory Smirnov	175.67	8	70.34	9	105.33
10	Olga Bibikhina / Daniil Zvorykin	154.28	10	57.53	10	96.75
11	Julia Tultseva / Anatoliy Belovodchenko	141.17	12	55.26	12	85.91
12	Ekaterina Mironova / Evgenii Ustenko	140.58	11	55.88	13	84.70
13	Maria Ignatieva / Mikhail Bragin	138.69	13	52.24	11	86.45
14	Elizaveta Pasechnik / Egor Kolosovskii	115.73	14	40.07	14	75.66

== Junior Championships ==
The 2020 Russian Junior Championships (Russian: Первенство России среди юниоров 2020) was held in Saransk, Mordovia on 4–8 February 2020. Competitors qualified through international success or by competing in the Russian Cup series' junior-level events. The results of the Junior Championships were part of the selection criteria for the 2020 World Junior Championships.

There are two separate basis for qualification.
1. Qualification based on competing at the 2019–20 Junior Grand Prix series.
2. Qualification based on Russian Cup series' junior-level results.

=== Preliminary entries ===
Men	Ladies	Pairs	Ice dance
Petr Gumennik	Kamila Valieva	Apollinariia Panfilova / Dmitry Rylov	Elizaveta Shanaeva / Devid Naryzhnyy
Andrei Mozalev	Daria Usacheva	Kseniia Akhanteva / Valerii Kolesov	Elizaveta Khudaiberdieva / Andrey Filatov
~~Artur Danielian~~ (withdrew)	Kseniia Sinitsyna	Iuliia Artemeva / Mikhail Nazarychev	Diana Davis / Gleb Smolkin
Daniil Samsonov	~~Viktoria Vasilieva~~ (withdrew)	Diana Mukhametzianova / Ilya Mironov	Sofya Tyutyunina / Alexander Shustitskiy
Ilya Yablokov	~~Anastasia Tarakanova~~ (withdrew)	~~Alina Pepeleva / Roman Pleshkov~~ (withdrew)	Ekaterina Katashinskaya / Aleksandr Vaskovich
Gleb Lutfullin	Maya Khromykh	Stanislava Vislobokova / Aleksei Briukhanov	~~Angelina Lazareva / Maksim Prokofiev~~ (withdrew)
Andrei Kutovoi	Anna Frolova	~~Anna Shcheglova / Ilya Kalashnikov~~ (withdrew)	Tamara Zhukova / Daniil Karpov
~~Egor Rukhin~~ (withdrew)	Sofia Akateva	Polina Kostiukovich / Dmitrii Ialin	~~Svetlana Lizunova / Alexander Vakhnov~~ (withdrew)
Matvei Vetlugin	Elizaveta Berestovskaia	Taisiia Sobinina / Nikita Volodin	Olga Mamchenkova / Mark Volkov
Georgiy Kunitsa	Elizaveta Osokina	Ekaterina Petushkova / Evgenii Malikov	Margarita Svistunova / Dmitrii Studenikin
Evgeni Semenenko	Nikol Vaytkus	Anastasia Mukhortova / Dmitry Evgenyev	Sofia Leonteva / Daniil Gorelkin
Artem Kovalev	Alina Gorbacheva	Alina Raskovalova / Artyom Butaev	~~Polina Ivanenko / Daniil Utkin~~ (withdrew)
Vladislav Dikidzhi	Sofia Samodelkina		Vasilisa Kaganovskaia / Valeriy Angelopol
Vsevolod Knyazev	Adeliia Petrosian		Elizaveta Shichina / Gordey Khubulov
Kirill Sarnovskiy	Nika Ryabinina		Angelina Zimina / Alexander Gnedin
Egor Petrov	Mariia Zakharova		Ekaterina Rybakova / Ivan Makhnonosov
Aleksandr Golubev	Sofia Moroz		Arina Ushakova / Maxim Nekrasov
Mikhail Polyanskiy	~~Varvara Kisel~~ (withdrew)		~~Irina Khavronina / Dario Cirisano~~ (withdrew)
Substitutes	Substitutes	Substitutes	Substitutes
Semyon Soloviev (added)	Kamila Sultanmagomedova (added)	Tatyana Kuzmina / Alexei Khvalko (added)	Sofia Aleksova / Ilya Vladimirov (added)
Semyon Bass	Sofia Muravieva (added)	Ekaterina Belova / Dmitrii Chigirev (added)	Taisiia Linchevskaia / Timur Babaev-Smirnov (added)
Mark Kondratiuk	Sofia Baranova (added)	Milana Matakaeva / Alexander Rebrik	Ksenia Davydova / Mikhail Antonov
Artem Timakin (added)	Maria Dmitrieva	Natalia Khabibullina / Ilya Knyazhuk	Anastasia Verbina / Alexander Vdovin

==== Changes to preliminary entries ====
Date	Discipline	Withdrew	Added	Reason/Other notes	Refs
23 November	Pairs	Anna Shcheglova / Ilya Kalashnikov	Tatyana Kuzmina / Alexei Khvalko	Split	
29 January	Men	Artur Danielian	Semyon Soloviev	Fatigue after the 2020 Europeans	
31 January	Ladies	Viktoria Vasilieva	Kamila Sultanmagomedova	Joint problems	
31 January	Ladies	Anastasia Tarakanova	Sofia Muravieva	Leg injury (sprain)	
31 January	Ladies	Varvara Kisel	Sofia Baranova	Switching countries to Belarus	
31 January	Pairs	Alina Pepeleva / Roman Pleshkov	Ekaterina Belova / Dmitrii Chigirev	Knee problems (Pepeleva)	
31 January	Ice dance	Angelina Lazareva / Maksim Prokofiev	Sofia Aleksova / Ilya Vladimirov	Hand injury (Lazareva)	
31 January	Ice dance	Svetlana Lizunova / Alexander Vakhnov	Taisiia Linchevskaia / Timur Babaev-Smirnov		
31 January	Ice dance	Polina Ivanenko / Daniil Utkin	None		
3 February	Men	Egor Rukhin	Artem Timakin	Injury	
5 February	Ice dance	Irina Khavronina / Dario Cirisano	None	Tonsillitis (Khavronina)	

=== Results ===
==== Men ====
Rank	Name	Total points	SP		FS	
1	Daniil Samsonov	261.22	2	84.40	2	176.82
2	Petr Gumennik	258.42	1	87.08	3	171.34
3	Andrei Mozalev	250.07	13	70.41	1	179.66
4	Georgiy Kunitsa	239.66	3	83.57	5	156.09
5	Evgeni Semenenko	237.18	5	80.36	4	156.82
6	Ilya Yablokov	226.10	4	81.62	6	144.48
7	Andrei Kutovoi	220.40	7	76.10	7	144.30
8	Artem Kovalev	217.60	6	79.40	9	138.20
9	Kirill Sarnovskiy	212.42	12	71.77	8	140.65
10	Vsevolod Knyazev	209.26	9	74.86	12	134.40
11	Aleksandr Golubev	208.10	15	69.91	10	138.19
12	Mikhail Polyanskiy	207.43	11	72.58	11	134.85
13	Matvei Vetlugin	205.65	8	75.70	15	129.95
14	Vladislav Dikidzhi	204.78	10	73.43	14	131.35
15	Egor Petrov	200.67	16	67.14	13	133.53
16	Gleb Lutfullin	193.72	14	69.94	16	123.78
17	Artem Timakin	171.59	17	63.60	18	107.99
18	Semyon Soloviev	166.96	18	56.72	17	110.24

==== Ladies ====
Rank	Name	Total points	SP		FS	
1	Kamila Valieva	238.17	1	78.50	1	159.67
2	Sofia Akateva	218.44	3	69.22	2	149.22
3	Daria Usacheva	217.30	2	73.77	3	143.53
4	Sofia Samodelkina	207.50	4	68.38	4	139.12
5	Maya Khromykh	204.40	6	67.68	5	136.72
6	Adeliia Petrosian	201.07	5	68.20	7	132.87
7	Kseniia Sinitsyna	200.41	11	64.60	6	135.81
8	Anna Frolova	198.94	8	66.27	8	132.67
9	Sofia Muravieva	191.84	7	66.90	11	124.94
10	Elizaveta Osokina	190.69	10	64.72	9	125.97
11	Elizaveta Berestovskaia	189.72	12	64.57	10	125.15
12	Alina Gorbacheva	185.00	13	63.64	12	121.36
13	Kamila Sultanmagomedova	178.07	17	61.22	13	116.85
14	Mariia Zakharova	177.54	14	62.80	14	114.74
15	Nikol Vaytkus	172.67	16	61.42	15	111.25
16	Nika Ryabinina	169.70	15	61.85	16	107.85
17	Sofia Moroz	167.36	9	65.39	18	101.97
18	Sofia Baranova	150.63	18	48.14	17	102.49

==== Pairs ====
Rank	Name	Total points	SP		FS	
1	Apollinariia Panfilova / Dmitry Rylov	207.47	1	75.49	1	131.98
2	Kseniia Akhanteva / Valerii Kolesov	202.20	2	72.46	2	129.74
3	Iuliia Artemeva / Mikhail Nazarychev	194.45	3	71.93	3	122.52
4	Diana Mukhametzianova / Ilya Mironov	191.61	4	70.94	5	120.67
5	Polina Kostiukovich / Dmitrii Ialin	187.66	6	66.11	4	121.55
6	Taisiia Sobinina / Nikita Volodin	175.85	10	61.26	6	114.59
7	Anastasia Mukhortova / Dmitry Evgenyev	175.81	5	67.99	7	107.82
8	Tatyana Kuzmina / Alexei Khvalko	171.32	7	63.57	8	107.75
9	Ekaterina Petushkova / Evgenii Malikov	168.79	8	63.56	11	105.23
10	Ekaterina Belova / Dmitrii Chigirev	168.33	11	61.07	9	107.26
11	Alina Raskovalova / Artyom Butaev	164.08	9	61.29	12	102.79
12	Stanislava Vislobokova / Aleksei Briukhanov	163.44	12	57.12	10	106.32

==== Ice dance ====
Rank	Name	Total points	RD		FD	
1	Elizaveta Shanaeva / Devid Naryzhnyy	182.09	2	71.24	1	110.85
2	Arina Ushakova / Maxim Nekrasov	181.72	1	71.37	2	110.35
3	Diana Davis / Gleb Smolkin	180.97	3	70.91	3	110.06
4	Elizaveta Khudaiberdieva / Andrey Filatov	171.38	4	66.16	4	105.22
5	Sofya Tyutyunina / Alexander Shustitskiy	166.41	6	63.91	5	102.50
6	Ekaterina Katashinskaya / Aleksandr Vaskovich	157.60	5	65.58	10	92.02
7	Sofia Leonteva / Daniil Gorelkin	157.30	9	60.38	6	96.92
8	Sofia Aleksova / Ilya Vladimirov	157.10	7	61.86	7	95.24
9	Olga Mamchenkova / Mark Volkov	155.34	8	60.77	8	94.57
10	Margarita Svistunova / Dmitrii Studenikin	149.55	11	57.33	9	92.22
11	Vasilisa Kaganovskaia / Valeriy Angelopol	148.87	10	57.96	11	90.91
12	Taisiia Linchevskaia / Timur Babaev-Smirnov	142.93	14	53.97	12	88.96
13	Elizaveta Shichina / Gordey Khubulov	137.86	16	49.90	13	87.96
14	Tamara Zhukova / Daniil Karpov	137.34	12	55.77	15	81.57
15	Ekaterina Rybakova / Ivan Makhnonosov	137.23	15	53.03	14	84.20
16	Angelina Zimina / Alexander Gnedin	133.34	13	54.97	16	78.37

== International team selections ==
=== Winter Youth Olympics ===
The list with preliminary entries of the Russia's team to the 2020 Winter Youth Olympics was published on 16 December 2019. The final list was approved on 24 December 2019.

	Men	Ladies	Pairs	Ice dancing
1	Andrei Mozalev	Kseniia Sinitsyna	Apollinariia Panfilova / Dmitry Rylov	Sofya Tyutyunina / Alexander Shustitskiy
2	Daniil Samsonov	~~Viktoria Vasilieva~~ (withdrew)	Diana Mukhametzianova / Ilya Mironov	Irina Khavronina / Dario Cirisano
Alt.		Anna Frolova (called up)		

=== European Championships ===
Russia's team to the 2020 European Championships was published on 29 December 2019.

	Men	Ladies	Pairs	Ice dancing
1	Dmitri Aliev	Anna Shcherbakova	Aleksandra Boikova / Dmitrii Kozlovskii	Victoria Sinitsina / Nikita Katsalapov
2	Artur Danielian	Alena Kostornaia	Evgenia Tarasova / Vladimir Morozov	Alexandra Stepanova / Ivan Bukin
3	Alexander Samarin	Alexandra Trusova	Daria Pavliuchenko / Denis Khodykin	Tiffany Zahorski / Jonathan Guerreiro
1st alt.	Makar Ignatov	Elizaveta Tuktamysheva	Anastasia Mishina / Aleksandr Galliamov	Annabelle Morozov / Andrei Bagin
2nd alt.	Andrei Mozalev	Anastasiia Guliakova	Alina Pepeleva / Roman Pleshkov	Anastasia Skoptsova / Kirill Aleshin
3rd alt.	Petr Gumennik		Apollinariia Panfilova / Dmitry Rylov	Sofia Shevchenko / Igor Eremenko

=== World Championships ===
Russia's team to the 2020 World Championships was published on 31 January 2020.

	Men	Ladies	Pairs	Ice dancing
1	Dmitri Aliev	Alena Kostornaia	Aleksandra Boikova / Dmitrii Kozlovskii	Victoria Sinitsina / Nikita Katsalapov
2	Artur Danielian	Anna Shcherbakova	Evgenia Tarasova / Vladimir Morozov	Alexandra Stepanova / Ivan Bukin
3		Alexandra Trusova	Daria Pavliuchenko / Denis Khodykin	Tiffany Zahorski / Jonathan Guerreiro
1st alt.	Alexander Samarin	Elizaveta Tuktamysheva	Anastasia Mishina / Aleksandr Galliamov	Annabelle Morozov / Andrei Bagin
2nd alt.	Makar Ignatov	Anastasiia Guliakova	Alina Pepeleva / Roman Pleshkov	Anastasia Skoptsova / Kirill Aleshin

=== World Junior Championships ===
Russia's team to the 2020 World Junior Championships was published on 10 February 2020.

	Men	Ladies	Pairs	Ice dancing
1	~~Daniil Samsonov~~ (withdrew)	Kamila Valieva	Apollinariia Panfilova / Dmitry Rylov	Elizaveta Shanaeva / Devid Naryzhnyy
2	Petr Gumennik	Daria Usacheva	Kseniia Akhanteva / Valerii Kolesov	Arina Ushakova / Maxim Nekrasov
3	Andrei Mozalev	Maya Khromykh	Iuliia Artemeva / Mikhail Nazarychev	Diana Davis / Gleb Smolkin
1st alt.	Ilya Yablokov (called up)	Kseniia Sinitsyna	Diana Mukhametzianova / Ilya Mironov	Elizaveta Khudaiberdieva / Andrey Filatov
2nd alt.	Andrei Kutovoi	Anna Frolova	Polina Kostiukovich / Dmitrii Ialin	Sofya Tyutyunina / Alexander Shustitskiy
