= Anastasiia Guliakova =

Russian figure skater

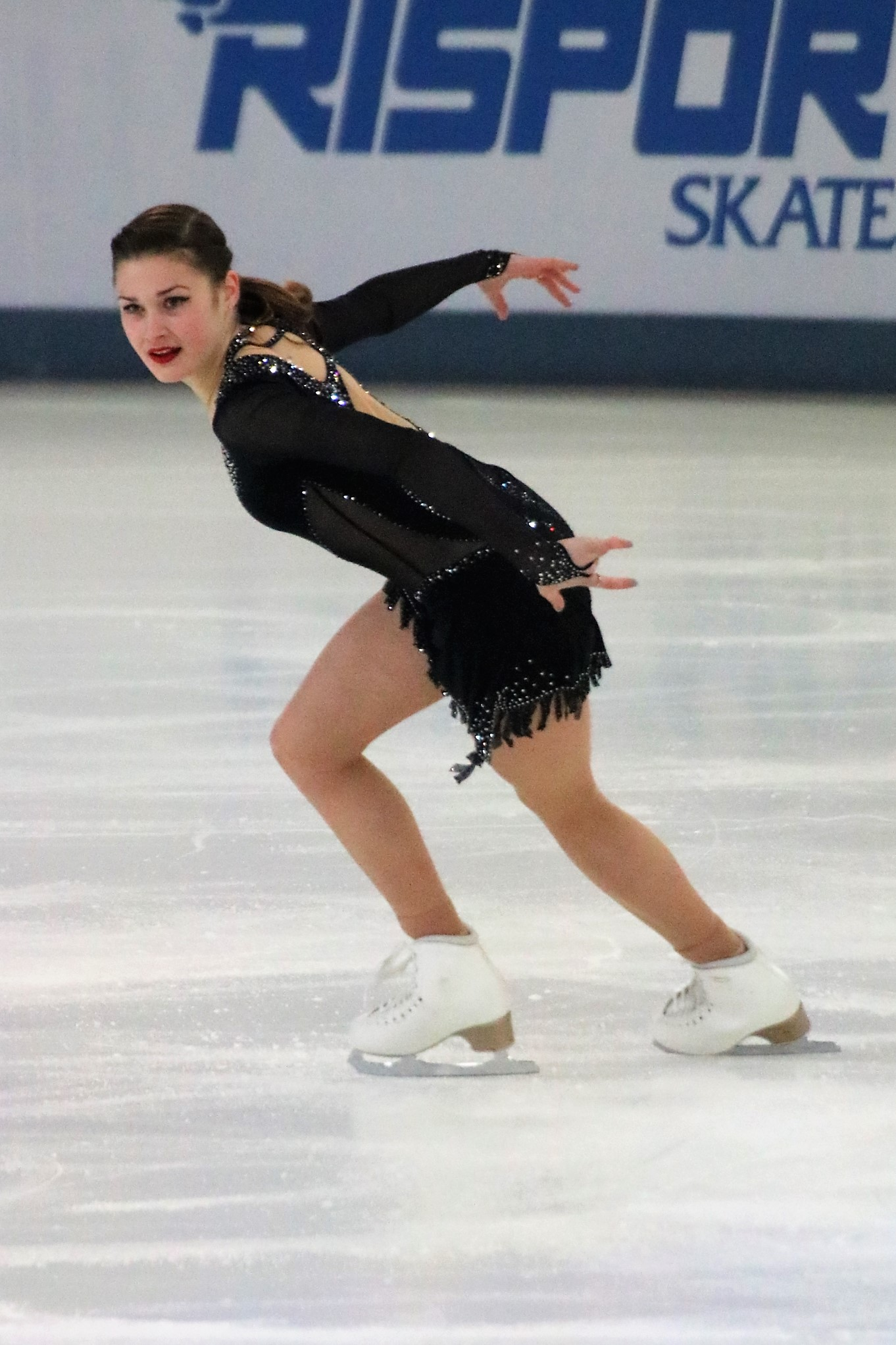

Personal information
- Native name: Анастасия Дмитриевна Гулякова (Russian)
- Full name: Anastasiia Dmitrievna Guliakova
- Other names: Anastasia Gulyakova
- Born: 29 August 2002 (age 24) Revda, Sverdlovsk Oblast, Russia
- Home town: Revda
- Height: 1.69 m (5 ft 6 1/2 in)

Figure skating career
- Country: Russia
- Coach: Alexei Mishin; Tatiana Mishina
- Skating club: Olympic School Zvezdni Led
- Began skating: 2005

Anastasiia Dmitrievna Guliakova (Russian: Анастасия Дмитриевна Гулякова; born 29 August 2002) is a Russian figure skater. She is the 2020 Rostelecom Cup bronze medalist, the 2018 Warsaw Cup champion, the 2019 Tallink Hotels Cup champion, and the 2018 Skate Victoria champion. Earlier in her career, she won silver at the 2017 JGP Australia.

== Career ==
=== Early years ===
Guliakova began learning to skate in 2005. She trained in Pervouralsk, Sverdlovsk Oblast, under Pyotr Kiprushev until 2015; she then moved to Moscow and began to be coached by Ilia Klimkin.

Guliakova finished eighth at the 2017 Russian Junior Championships behind Anastasiia Gubanova. In the summer of 2018, she parted ways with Klimkin to move to Alexei Mishin's camp.

=== 2017–18 season ===
Guliakova made her international debut in the first Junior Grand Prix event at the 2017 Junior Grand Prix Australia in Brisbane, Australia; she was ranked second in both segments and won the silver medal behind teammate Alexandra Trusova.

At the 2018 Russian Championships, Gulyakova placed thirteenth on the senior level and tenth at the junior event.

=== 2018–19 season ===
In late November Guliakova made her international senior debut at the 2018 Warsaw Cup where she won the gold medal. In early December she competed at the 2018 CS Golden Spin of Zagreb where she finished fourth with a personal best score of 188.90 points.

=== 2019–20 season ===
Competing internationally, Guliakova won silver medals at the Denis Ten Memorial Challenge and the Tallinn Trophy. She placed seventh at the 2020 Russian Championships.

=== 2020–21 season ===
Competing domestically in the Russian Cup series, Guliakova placed fifth at the third stage in Sochi. She was assigned to make her Grand Prix debut at the 2020 Rostelecom Cup, the ISU having opted to run the Grand Prix based largely on geographic location due to the COVID-19 pandemic. She placed fourth in the short program. Third in the free skate, she rose to the bronze medal position following an unexpectedly poor performance from Alexandra Trusova, who dropped to fourth place.

On December 3, it was announced that Guliakova had to withdraw from the fifth stage of the Cup of Russia series after training mate Elizaveta Tuktamysheva contracted COVID-19. She subsequently competed at the 2021 Russian Championships, placing eighth in the short program after stepping out on her triple Lutz. She then placed fourteenth in the free skate, dropping to twelfth overall.

== Programs ==
| Season | Short program | Free skating | Exhibition |
|---|---|---|---|
| 2020–2021 | Scheherazade by Nikolai Rimsky-Korsakov | Don't Say You Do by Lola Blanc; Naughty Hands by Xavier Mortimer and Maxime Rodriguez; Real Boy by Lola Blanc | Lady Marmalade performed by Christina Aguilera, Lil' Kim, Mya, Pink; Candyman by Christina Aguilera |
| 2019–2020 | Carmen by Georges Bizet | Swan Lake by Petr I. Tchaikovski | |
| 2018–2019 | Malagueña performed by Nana Mouskouri | Scheherazade by Nikolai Rimsky-Korsakov | Quizás, Quizás, Quizás by Osvaldo Farrés |
| 2017–2018 | Angels and Demons by Hans Zimmer | Ghost by Milan | |
| 2016–2017 | Angels and Demons by Hans Zimmer | Chicago by John Kander | |

== Competitive highlights ==
JGP: Junior Grand Prix

International
| Event | 16–17 | 17–18 | 18–19 | 19–20 | 20–21 | 21–22 |
|---|---|---|---|---|---|---|
| GP Rostelecom Cup | | | | | 3rd | |
| CS Golden Spin | | | 4th | | | |
| Denis Ten Memorial | | | | 2nd | | |
| Dragon Trophy | | | 2nd | | | |
| Ice Star | | | | | 2nd | 2nd |
| Skate Victoria | | | 1st | | | |
| Tallink Hotels Cup | | | | 1st | | |
| Tallinn Trophy | | | | 2nd | | |
| Warsaw Cup | | | 1st | | | |
International: Junior
| JGP Australia | | 2nd | | | | |
| Golden Spin | | 1st | | | | |
| Volvo Open Cup | | 1st | | | | |
National
| Russian Champ. | | 13th | 10th | 7th | 12th | WD |
| Russian Junior Champ. | 8th | 10th | | | | |
| Russian Cup (Moscow) | | | | | WD | |
| Russian Cup (Sochi) | | | | | 5th | |
| Russian Cup Final | 6th J | 5th | 9th | 1st | WD | |
TBD = Assigned; WD = Withdrew; Levels: J = Junior

== Detailed results ==
=== Senior level ===
2021–22 season
| Date | Event | SP | FS | Total |
| 14–18 October 2021 | 2021 Ice star | 2; 62.01 | 2; 121.05 | 2; 183.06 |
2020–21 season
| Date | Event | SP | FS | Total |
| 23–27 December 2020 | 2021 Russian Championships | 8; 70.24 | 14; 115.51 | 12; 185.75 |
| 20–22 November 2020 | 2020 Rostelecom Cup | 4; 70.07 | 3; 128.96 | 3; 199.03 |
| 29 Oct – 1 Nov 2020 | 2020 Ice star | 1; 67.51 | 2; 114.46 | 2; 181.97 |
| 23–27 October 2020 | 2020 Cup of Russia Series, 3rd Stage, Sochi domestic competition | 4; 69.29 | 5; 117.15 | 5; 186.44 |
2019–20 season
| Date | Event | SP | FS | Total |
| 18–22 February 2020 | 2020 Russian Cup Final domestic competition | 1; 73.23 | 1; 140.49 | 1; 213.72 |
| 13–16 February 2020 | 2020 Tallink Hotels Cup | 1; 65.25 | 1; 134.86 | 1; 200.11 |
| 26–29 December 2019 | 2020 Russian Championships | 6; 66.85 | 7; 130.14 | 7; 196.99 |
| 11–17 November 2019 | 2019 Tallinn Trophy | 2; 59.53 | 2; 110.81 | 2; 170.34 |
| 9–12 October 2019 | 2019 Denis Ten Memorial Challenge | 2; 64.00 | 3; 111.29 | 2; 175.29 |
2018–19 season
| Date | Event | SP | FS | Total |
| 9–14 April 2019 | 2019 Skate Victoria | 2; 58.30 | 1; 129.74 | 1; 188.04 |
| 7–10 February 2019 | 2019 Dragon Trophy | 5; 48.38 | 2; 116.05 | 2; 164.43 |
| 19–23 December 2018 | 2019 Russian Championships | 10; 68.99 | 10; 133.64 | 10; 202.63 |
| 5–8 December 2018 | 2018 CS Golden Spin of Zagreb | 3; 67.85 | 4; 121.05 | 4; 188.90 |
| 23–25 November 2018 | 2018 Warsaw Cup | 1; 66.11 | 1; 112.28 | 1; 178.39 |

=== Junior level ===
2017–18 season
| Date | Event | Level | SP | FS | Total |
| 23–26 January 2018 | 2018 Russian Junior Championships | Junior | 6; 68.88 | 11; 122.99 | 10; 191.87 |
| 21–24 December 2017 | 2018 Russian Championships | Senior | 12; 66.35 | 14; 121.52 | 13; 187.87 |
| 6–9 December 2017 | 2017 Golden Spin of Zagreb | Junior | 2; 56.37 | 1; 118.09 | 1; 174.46 |
| 8–12 November 2017 | 2017 Volvo Open Cup | Junior | 1; 50.92 | 1; 120.25 | 1; 171.17 |
| 23–26 August 2017 | 2017 JGP Australia | Junior | 2; 63.47 | 2; 117.96 | 2; 181.43 |
2016–17 season
| Date | Event | Level | SP | FS | Total |
| 1–5 February 2017 | 2017 Russian Junior Championships | Junior | 4; 66.13 | 12; 115.87 | 8; 182.00 |
