= ISU Junior Grand Prix in Russia =

International figure skating competition

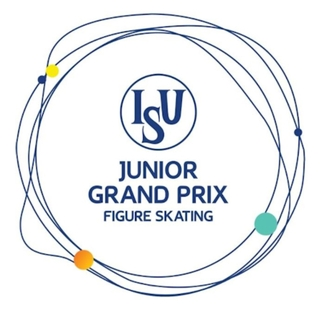
- Genre: ISU Junior Grand Prix
- Location: Russia
- Most recent: 2021

The ISU Junior Grand Prix in Russia is an international figure skating competition sanctioned by the International Skating Union (ISU), organized and hosted by the Figure Skating Federation of Russia (Russian: Федерация фигурного катания на коньках России). It is held periodically as an event of the ISU Junior Grand Prix of Figure Skating (JGP), a series of international competitions exclusively for junior-level skaters. Medals may be awarded in men's singles, women's singles, pair skating, and ice dance. Skaters earn points based on their results at the qualifying competitions each season, and the top skaters or teams in each discipline are invited to then compete at the Junior Grand Prix of Figure Skating Final.

== History ==
The ISU Junior Grand Prix of Figure Skating (JGP) was established by the International Skating Union (ISU) in 1997 and consists of a series of seven international figure skating competitions exclusively for junior-level skaters. The locations of the Junior Grand Prix events change every year. While all seven competitions feature the men's, women's, and ice dance events, only four competitions each season feature the pairs event. Skaters earn points based on their results each season, and the top skaters or teams in each discipline are then invited to compete at the Junior Grand Prix of Figure Skating Final.

Skaters are eligible to compete on the junior-level circuit if they are at least 13 years old before 1 July of the respective season, but not yet 19 (for single skaters), 21 (for men and women in ice dance and women in pair skating), or 23 (for men in pair skating). Competitors are chosen by their respective skating federations. The number of entries allotted to each ISU member nation in each discipline is determined by their results at the prior World Junior Figure Skating Championships.

== Results ==
=== Men's singles ===
Year	Location	Gold	Silver	Bronze	Ref.
2012 Final	Sochi	(Russia) Maxim Kovtun	(United States) Joshua Farris	(Japan) Ryuju Hino	
2016	Saransk	(Russia) Alexander Samarin	(United States) Andrew Torgashev	(Czech Republic) Matyáš Bělohradský	
2019	Chelyabinsk	(Russia) Petr Gumennik	(Russia) Artur Danielian	(Russia) Ilya Yablokov	
2021	Krasnoyarsk	(Russia) Gleb Lutfullin	(Russia) Egor Rukhin	(Canada) Wesley Chiu	

=== Women's singles ===
Year	Location	Gold	Silver	Bronze	Ref.
2012 Final	Sochi	(Russia) Elena Radionova	(United States) Hannah Miller	(Russia) Anna Pogorilaya	
2016	Saransk	(Russia) Polina Tsurskaya	(Russia) Stanislava Konstantinova	(Russia) Elizaveta Nugumanova	
2019	Chelyabinsk	(Russia) Kamila Valieva	(Russia) Kseniia Sinitsyna	(Russia) Viktoria Vasilieva	
2021	Krasnoyarsk	(Russia) Sofia Akateva	(Russia) Anastasia Zinina	(Russia) Sofia Samodelkina	

=== Pairs ===
Year	Location	Gold	Silver	Bronze	Ref.
2012 Final	Sochi	(Russia); Lina Fedorova; Maxim Miroshkin	(Russia); Vasilisa Davankova; Andrei Deputat	(Russia); Maria Vigalova; Egor Zakroev	
2016	Saransk	(Russia); Anastasia Mishina; Vladislav Mirzoev	(Russia); Aleksandra Boikova; Dmitrii Kozlovskii	(Russia); Ekaterina Borisova; Dmitry Sopot	
2019	Chelyabinsk	(Russia); Kseniia Akhanteva; Valerii Kolesov	(Russia); Iuliia Artemeva; Mikhail Nazarychev	(Russia); Diana Mukhametzianova; Ilya Mironov	
2021	Krasnoyarsk	(Russia); Ekaterina Chikmareva; Matvei Ianchenkov	(Russia); Natalia Khabibullina; Ilya Knyazhuk	(Russia); Ekaterina Petushkova; Evgenii Malikov	

=== Ice dance ===
Year	Location	Gold	Silver	Bronze	Ref.
2012 Final	Sochi	(Russia); Alexandra Stepanova; Ivan Bukin	(France); Gabriella Papadakis; Guillaume Cizeron	(United States); Alexandra Aldridge; Daniel Eaton	
2016	Saransk	(Russia); Alla Loboda; Pavel Drozd	(United States); Christina Carreira; Anthony Ponomarenko	(Russia); Sofia Shevchenko; Igor Eremenko	
2019	Chelyabinsk	(Russia); Elizaveta Shanaeva; Devid Naryzhnyy	(Russia); Diana Davis; Gleb Smolkin	(Canada); Nadiia Bashynska; Peter Beaumont	
2021	Krasnoyarsk	(Russia); Irina Khavronina; Dario Cirisano	(Russia); Sofia Leonteva; Daniil Gorelkin	(United States); Angela Ling; Caleb Wein	
