= Iuliia Artemeva =

Russian pair skater

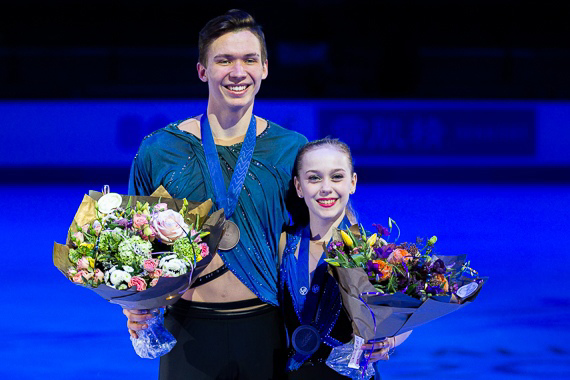
- Artemeva/Nazarychev at 2020 Junior Worlds

Personal information
- Native name: Юлия Сергеевна Артемьева (Russian)
- Full name: Iuliia Sergeevna Artemeva
- Other names: Yulia/Yuliya Artemieva
- Born: 16 March 2005 (age 21) Kazan, Russia
- Home town: Perm, Russia
- Height: 1.51 m (4 ft 11 1/2 in)

Figure skating career
- Country: Russia
- Partner: Aleksei Briukhanov
- Coach: Pavel Sliusarenko; Alexei Menshikov; Valentina Tiukova
- Skating club: Perm Region Sport Center - Start
- Began skating: 2008
Medal record
Representing Russia
Figure skating: Pairs
World Junior Championships
Bronze medal – third place	2020 Tallinn	Pairs

Iuliia Sergeevna Artemeva (Russian: Юлия Сергеевна Артемьева, born 16 March 2005) is a Russian pair skater. With her former partner, Mikhail Nazarychev, she is the 2021 Gran Premio d'Italia bronze medalist.

On the junior level, Artemeva/Nazarychev are the 2020 World Junior bronze medalists, the 2020 Russian junior national bronze medalists, the 2019 JGP Croatia champions, the 2019 JGP Russia silver medalists, and 2019–20 Junior Grand Prix Final qualifiers.

== Career ==
=== Early years ===
Artemeva began learning how to skate in 2008 at the age of three. Up until the end of 2017–18 figure skating season, she trained as a single skater in her hometown of Kazan at the Strela Youth Sports School. Coached by Svetlana Romanova and Rezeda Sibgatullina, she finished 14th at 2018 Russian Younger Age Nationals. Artemeva made the transition to pairs at the beginning of the 2018–19 figure skating season, teaming up with current partner Mikhail Nazarychev and relocating to Perm. Artemeva/Nazarychev only competed domestically during the 2018–19 season and finished 10th at 2019 Russian Elder Age Nationals.

=== 2019–20 season ===
Artemeva/Nazarychev made their international junior debut in September at the 2019 JGP Russia. The team placed second in both their short program and their free skate to earn a silver medal on the all-Russian podium between teammates Kseniia Akhanteva / Valerii Kolesov and Diana Mukhametzianova / Ilya Mironov. At their second Junior Grand Prix assignment, 2019 JGP Croatia, Artemeva/Nazarychev won gold and set new personal bests after placing second in the short program and first in the free skate, thus qualifying to the 2019–20 Junior Grand Prix Final. In qualifying to the Final, Artemeva/Nazarychev secured byes into the 2020 Russian Championships on both the senior and junior levels. They placed fourth at the Final.

Seventh at the senior nationals, they were bronze medalists at junior nationals, securing a place at the 2020 World Junior Championships in Tallinn, Estonia. Artemeva/Nazarychev were third in the short program, narrowly behind second-place finishers Akhanteva/Kolesov. The free skate proved a struggle, Artemeva falling on both throw jumps as well as her side-by-side double Axel attempt. They nevertheless remained in bronze medal position, aided by errors by fourth-place finishers Hocke/Kunkel of Germany.

=== 2020–21 season ===
Artemeva/Nazarychev made their Grand Prix debut at the 2020 Rostelecom Cup, where they finished fifth. They placed eighth at the 2021 Russian Championships and then won the Russian junior national title.

=== 2021–22 season ===
Artemeva/Nazarychev were initially assigned to the 2021 Cup of China as their first Grand Prix, but following the event's cancellation they were reassigned to the 2021 Gran Premio d'Italia. Fourth in the short program, they rose to third in the free skate to win the bronze medal behind Chinese teams Sui/Han and Peng/Jin. At their second event, the 2021 Internationaux de France, they placed second in both programs to take the silver medal, making only one error in their free skate when Artemeva doubled and stepped out of her planned triple toe loop. Nazarychev said afterward, "overall, it was a good performance. We set goals for ourselves to do well on the Grand Prix, and I think we fulfilled that."

At the 2022 Russian Championships, Artemeva/Nazarychev finished in fifth. They also competed at the junior edition, losing to Natalia Khabibullina / Ilya Knyazhuk. On 2 June 2022, it was announced that Artemeva/Nazarychev had ended their partnership. Artemeva teamed up with Aleksei Briukhanov.

== Programs ==
=== With Briukhanov ===
Season	Short program	Free skating	Exhibition
2025–2026	Sarabande by George Frideric Handel performed by Wall of Noise	Terra Rossa by Balázs Havasi	Mocking Bird by Hazmat Modine
2024–2025	Did not compete this season		
2023–2024	Sarabande by George Frideric Handel performed by Wall of Noise	No One Like You by Red Electric and Joseph Calleja	
2022–2023	Mocking Bird by Hazmat Modine	Lift Me Up; Natural Blues by Moby	

=== With Nazarychev ===
Season	Short program	Free skating
2021–2022	The Artist Ouverture (from The Artist) by Ludovic Bource; Bumble Boogie by Jools Holland and his Rhythm & Blues Orchestra choreo. by Ivan Malafeev	Fire on Fire (from Watership Down) by Sam Smith; Chronos by Kirill Richter choreo. by Nikolai Morozov
2019–2021	Senza Parole performed by Il Divo	Don't Stop Me Now; Love of My Life; We Will Rock You by Queen

== Competitive highlights ==
GP: Grand Prix; CS: Challenger Series; JGP: Junior Grand Prix

=== With Briukhanov ===
National
Event	22–23	23–24	24–25	25–26
Russian Champ.	10th	5th		4th
Russian Junior	2nd			
Russian Cup Final (Note: The 2023 Russian Cup Final was renamed as the 2023 Russian Grand Prix Final.)	6th	3rd		
GPR Magnitogorsk				3rd
GPR Kazan				3rd
GPR Golden Skate		3rd		
GPR Heart of Siberia		3rd		
GPR Idel	3rd			
GPR Volga Pirouette	2nd			

=== With Nazarychev ===
International
Event	18–19	19–20	20–21	21–22
GP Cup of China				C
GP France				2nd
GP Italy				3rd
GP Rostelecom			5th	
CS Golden Spin				3rd
International: Junior
Junior Worlds		3rd		
JGP Final		4th		
JGP Croatia		1st		
JGP Russia		2nd		
National
Russian Champ.		7th	8th	5th
Russian Junior		3rd	1st	2nd
Russian Elder Youth	10th			
WD = Withdrew; C = Event cancelled

== Detailed results ==
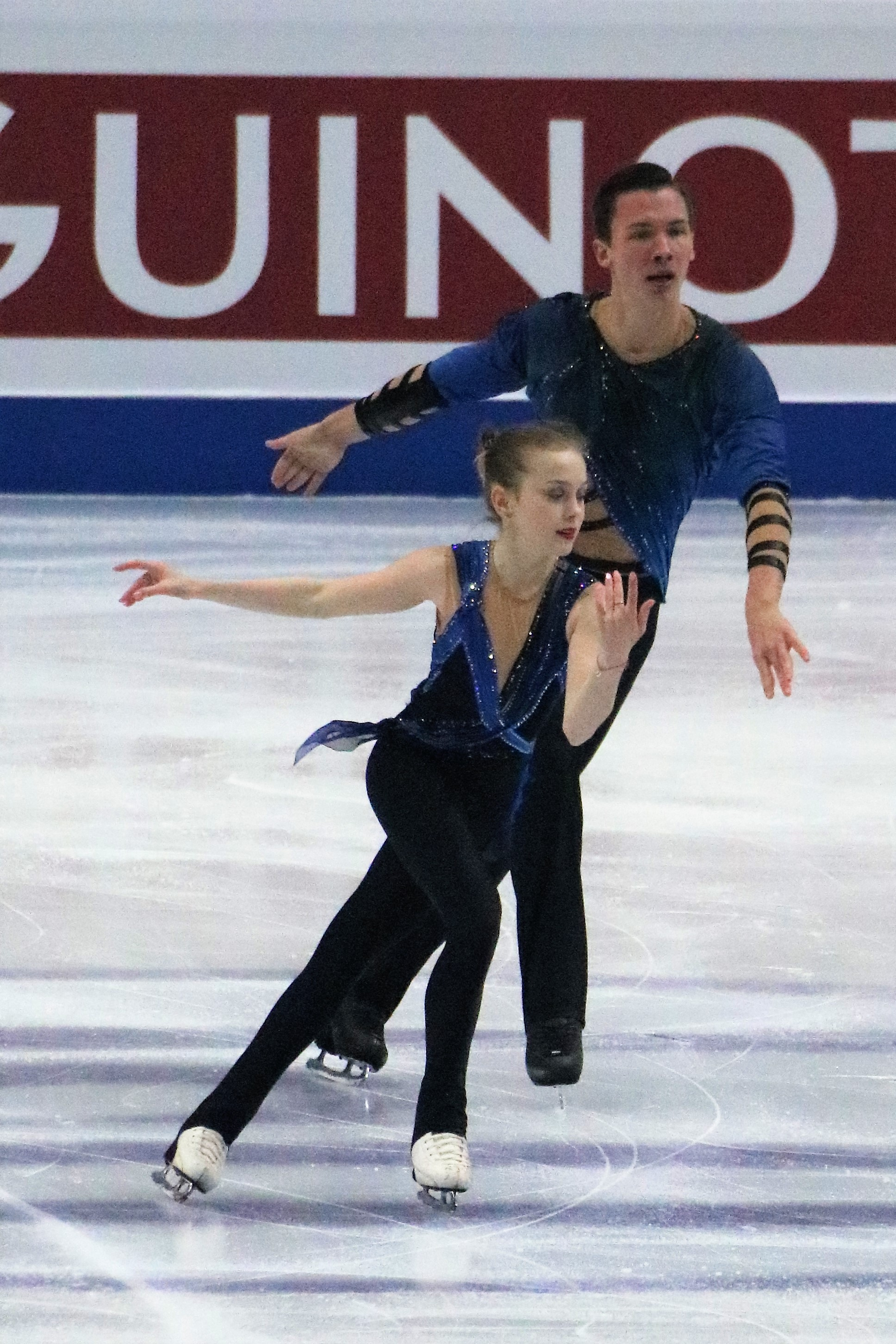
Artemeva/Nazarychev at the 2019–20 JGP Final

Small medals for short and free programs awarded only at ISU Championships. Personal bests highlighted in bold.

=== With Briukhanov ===
==== Senior results ====
**2025–26 season**
Date	Event	SP	FS	Total
07–10 November 2025	2025 Cup of Russia Series, 3rd Stage	4; 64.98	2; 125.57	3; 190.55
24–26 October 2025	2025 Cup of Russia Series, 1st Stage	3; 64.61	2; 120.74	3; 185.35
**2023–24 season**
Date	Event	SP	FS	Total
14–19 February 2024	2024 Russian Grand Prix Final	3; 77.31	3; 141.39	3; 218.70
20–24 December 2023	2024 Russian Championships	4; 75.85	6; 136.38	5; 212.23
24–27 November 2023	2023 Cup of Russia Series, 6th Stage	4; 73.94	3; 138.64	3; 212.58
20–23 October 2023	2023 Cup of Russia Series, 2nd Stage	2; 72.85	3; 130.47	3; 203.32
**2022–23 season**
Date	Event	SP	FS	Total
3–5 March 2023	2023 Russian Grand Prix Final	4; 79.05	7; 125.57	6; 204.62
20–26 December 2022	2023 Russian Championships	9; 70.20	10; 123.99	10; 194.19
18–21 November 2022	2022 Cup of Russia Series, 5th Stage	2; 75.74	3; 138.86	2; 214.60
4–7 November 2022	2022 Cup of Russia Series, 3rd Stage	3; 76.51	3; 137.80	3; 214.31

==== Junior results ====
**2022–23 season**
Date	Event	SP	FS	Total
14–18 February 2023	2022 Russian Junior Championships	2; 72.57	1; 130.41	2; 202.98

=== With Nazarychev ===
==== Senior results ====
**2021–22 season**
Date	Event	SP	FS	Total
December 21–26, 2021	2022 Russian Championships	4; 76.26	6; 136.93	5; 213.19
December 9–11, 2021	2021 CS Golden Spin of Zagreb	7; 61.18	3; 128.11	3; 189.29
November 19–21, 2021	2021 Internationaux de France	2; **73.02**	2; **132.13**	2; **205.15**
November 5–7, 2021	2021 Gran Premio d'Italia	4; 61.90	3; 125.11	3; 187.01
**2020–21 season**
Date	Event	SP	FS	Total
December 23–27, 2020	2021 Russian Championships	9; 63.69	8; 126.07	8; 189.76
November 20–22, 2020	2020 Rostelecom Cup	5; 70.11	5; 130.66	5; 200.77
**2019–20 season**
Date	Event	SP	FS	Total
December 24–28, 2019	2020 Russian Championships	7; 68.64	7; 128.85	7; 197.49

==== Junior results ====
**2021–22 season**
Date	Event	SP	FS	Total
18–22 January 2022	2022 Russian Junior Championships	1; 74.30	2; 126.23	2; 200.53
**2020–21 season**
Date	Event	SP	FS	Total
February 1–5, 2021	2021 Russian Junior Championships	1; 70.87	1; 133.63	1; 204.50
**2019–20 season**
Date	Event	SP	FS	Total
March 2–8, 2020	2020 World Junior Championships	3; 70.26	4; 100.92	3; 171.18
February 4–8, 2020	2020 Russian Junior Championships	3; 71.93	3; 122.52	3; 194.45
December 4–8, 2019	2019–20 Junior Grand Prix Final	5; 63.89	3; 114.67	4; 178.56
September 25–28, 2019	2019 JGP Croatia	2; 62.44	1; 117.39	1; 179.83
September 11–14, 2019	2019 JGP Russia	2; 67.12	2; 111.19	2; 178.31
