= Kseniia Akhanteva =

Russian pair skater

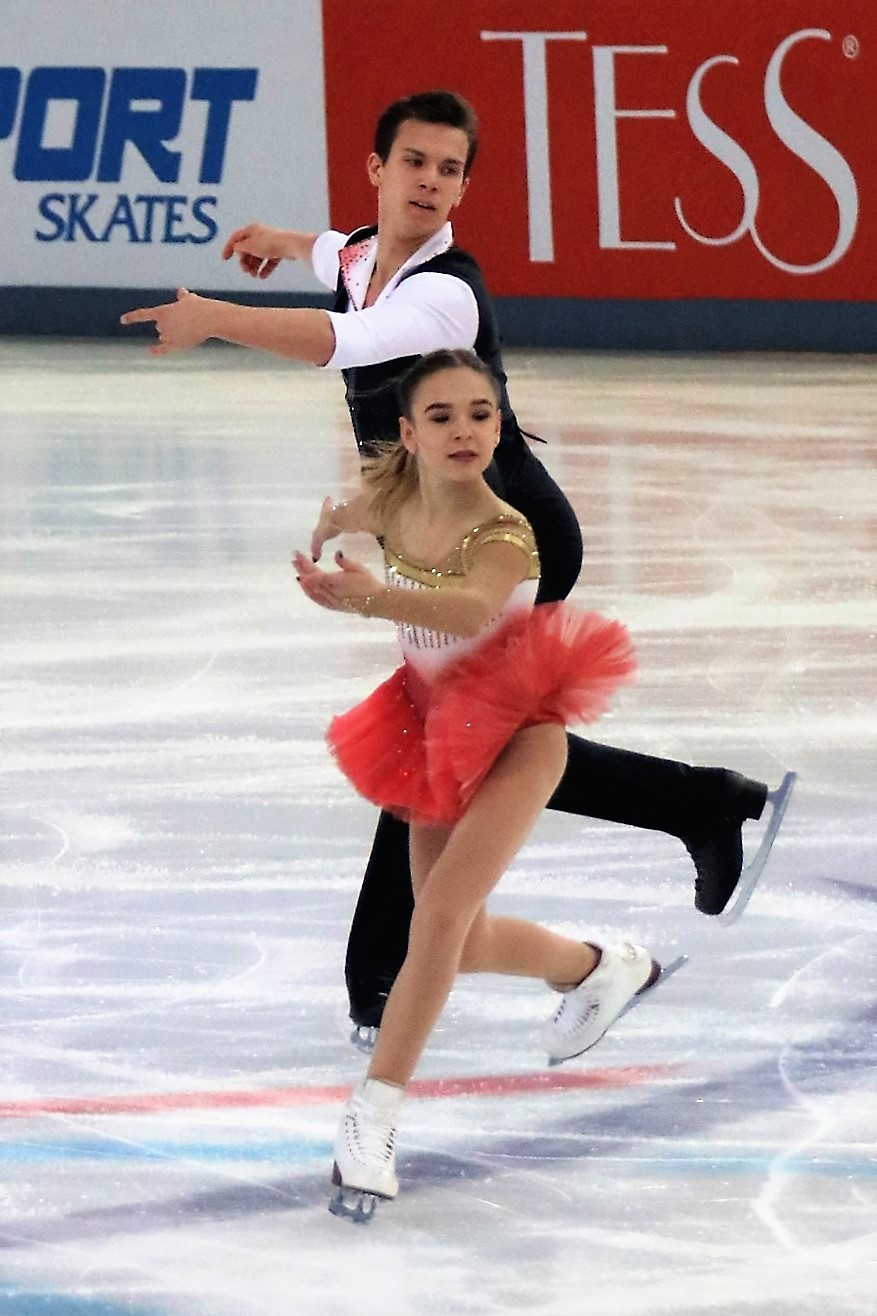
- Akhanteva/Kolesov at the 2019 Russian Championships

Personal information
- Native name: Ксения Андреевна Ахантьева
- Full name: Kseniia Andreyevna Akhanteva
- Other names: Ksenia Akhanteva
- Born: 7 October 2002 (age 24) Vladivostok, Russia
- Home town: Saint Petersburg, Russia
- Height: 1.50 m (4 ft 11 in)

Figure skating career
- Country: Russia
- Coach: Fedor Klimov
- Skating club: Olympic Sport School St. Petersburg
- Began skating: 2006
Medal record
Representing Russia
Figure skating: Pairs
World Junior Championships
Silver medal – second place	2020 Tallinn	Pairs
Junior Grand Prix Final
Bronze medal – third place	2019–20 Turin	Pairs

Kseniia Andreyevna Akhanteva (Russian: Ксения Андреевна Ахантьева, born 7 October 2002) is a Russian pair skater. With her former partner, Valerii Kolesov, she is the 2020 World Junior silver medalist, the 2020 Russian Junior National silver medalist and 2019–20 Junior Grand Prix Final bronze medalist.

== Career ==
=== Early years ===
Akhanteva began learning to skate in 2006. She began competing with her first pair skating partner, Valerii Kolesov, in 2014.

=== 2016–2017 season ===
Coached by Vasilii Velikov in Saint Petersburg, Akhanteva/Kolesov made their international debut in late August 2016, placing seventh at the Junior Grand Prix (JGP) competition in Ostrava, Czech Republic. In November, they won the junior silver medal at the Volvo Open Cup, finishing second behind their teammates Nika Osipova / Aleksandr Galiamov.

=== 2017–2018 season ===
In September, Akhanteva/Kolesov placed sixth at the 2017 JGP competition in Riga, Latvia. The pair had the same final result at the 2018 Russian Junior Championships, which took place in January in Saransk. In April, they took silver at the Russian Youth Championships – Elder Age, where they finished second to Amina Atakhanova / Nikita Volodin and ahead of Apollinariia Panfilova / Dmitry Rylov.

=== 2018–2019 season ===
Coached by Ludmila Velikova, Nikolai Velikov and Vasilii Velikov, Akhanteva/Kolesov started their season in August on the 2018 JGP series. Ranked second in the short and third in the free, they won the bronze medal in Bratislava, Slovakia, contributing to a Russian sweep of the pairs' podium. Akhanteva/Kolesov were more than 11 points behind the champions, their training partners Anastasia Mishina / Aleksandr Galiamov, but lost to the silver medalists, Apollinariia Panfilova / Dmitry Rylov, by a margin of only 0.13 points. In September, they outscored their teammates and training partners, Polina Kostiukovich / Dmitrii Ialin, by about four points for gold at the JGP in Ostrava, Czech Republic, where they were second in the short program and first in the free skate. With these results they have qualified to the 2018–2019 Junior Grand Prix Final, where they placed fourth overall. Akhanteva/Kolesov went on to compete at 2019 Russian Nationals, their first ever senior competition, and finished tenth there. Unfortunately they had to withdraw from the junior event after Akhanteva seriously injured her leg.

=== 2019–2020 season ===
Akhanteva/Kolesov started their season with a silver medal at the 2019 Junior Grand Prix competition in Lake Placid, United States. Ranked second in the short and second in the free, they finished 15 points behind the gold medalists Apollinariia Panfilova / Dmitry Rylov, in part due to costly jumping errors in both programs. Two weeks later Akhanteva/Kolesov took the gold at JGP Chelyabinsk, Russia. Ranked first in the short program and first in the free skate, they finished eight points ahead of silver medalists Iuliia Artemeva / Mikhail Nazarychev, and led a Russian sweep of the pairs' podium at their home JGP. At this event Akhanteva/Kolesov became the first junior pairs team to break 40 TES in the short program. Their results qualified them to the 2019–20 Junior Grand Prix Final in Turin, where they won the bronze medal.

Competing at the 2020 Russian Championships at the senior level, they placed tenth. Having then won the silver medal at the junior championships, they were named to Russia's team for the 2020 World Junior Championships. Second in the short program with a clean skate, Kolesov nevertheless said he felt it was not their best performance and stated their goal was to achieve a season's best result in the free. In that segment, Akhanteva fell on both side-by-side jump attempts and put a foot and hand down on one of their two throw jumps, but they nevertheless remained in second place and won the silver medal overall due to errors by third- and fourth-place finishers Artemeva/Nazarychev and Hocke/Kunkel. Kolesov acknowledged "the performance was bad today. I don't know the reason, but the result is good, because the short program was good."

=== 2020–2021 season ===
Competing on the domestic Cup of Russia series, Akhanteva/Kolesov won the silver medal at the first stage in Syzran. They made their Grand Prix debut at the 2020 Rostelecom Cup, finishing sixth among the seven teams. They withdrew from the 2021 Russian Championships at the senior level, and then won the junior silver medal later in the season.

=== 2021–2022 season ===
With the resumption of the Junior Grand Prix, Akhanteva/Kolesov competed at the 2021 JPG Slovakia. They placed second in the short program, but multiple falls in the free skate dropped them to fourth overall.

On April 18, it was announced that Akhanteva and Kolesov had split.

== Programs ==
=== With Kolesov ===
Season	Short program	Free skating
2021–2022	Heart of Glass (Crabtree Remix) (from The Handmaid's Tale) by Blondie and Philip Glass; Heart of Glass performed by Miley Cyrus	A Thousand Times Goodnight (from Romeo & Juliet) by Abel Korzeniowski
2020–2021	Mirko (from Alegría) by René Dupéré	Shine On You Crazy Diamond by Pink Floyd
2019–2020	Interstellar by Hans Zimmer	Shine On You Crazy Diamond by Pink Floyd
2018–2019	Interstellar by Hans Zimmer	Czardas by Vittorio Monti
2017–2018	Tarantella	Kung Fu Panda by Hans Zimmer, John Powell
2016–2017	8½ by Nino Rota	Kung Fu Panda by Hans Zimmer, John Powell

== Competitive highlights ==
GP: Grand Prix; JGP: Junior Grand Prix

=== With Kolesov ===
International
Event	16–17	17–18	18–19	19–20	20–21	21–22
GP Rostelecom Cup					6th	
International: Junior
Junior Worlds				2nd		
JGP Final			4th	3rd		
JGP Czech Republic	7th		1st			
JGP Latvia		6th				
JGP Russia				1st		
JGP Slovakia			3rd			4th
JGP U.S.				2nd		
Volvo Open Cup	2nd J					
National
Russian Champ.			10th	10th	WD	
Russian Jr. Champ.	WD	6th	WD	2nd	2nd	7th
Russia: Youth, Elder	2nd	2nd				
WD = Withdrew

== Detailed results ==
Small medals for short and free programs awarded only at ISU Championships.

With Kolesov

=== Senior ===
2020–21 season
Date	Event	SP	FS	Total
20–22 November 2020	2020 Rostelecom Cup	6; 67.50	6; 109.13	6; 176.63
2019–20 season
Date	Event	SP	FS	Total
24–29 December 2019	2020 Russian Championships	9; 67.37	11; 112.24	10; 179.61
2018–19 season
Date	Event	SP	FS	Total
19–23 December 2018	2019 Russian Championships	12; 57.90	9; 117.14	10; 175.04

=== Junior ===
2021–22 season
Date	Event	SP	FS	Total
18–22 January 2022	2022 Russian Junior Championships	7; 67.80	TBD	TBD
1–4 September 2021	2021 JGP Slovakia	2; 58.20	5; 93.15	4; 151.35
2020–21 season
Date	Event	SP	FS	Total
1–5 February 2021	2021 Russian Junior Championships	2; 68.40	2; 125.86	2; 194.26
2019–20 season
Date	Event	SP	FS	Total
2–8 March 2020	2020 World Junior Championships	2; 70.44	2; 104.41	2; 174.85
4–8 February 2020	2020 Russian Junior Championships	2; 72.46	2; 129.74	2; 202.20
4–8 December 2019	2019–20 Junior Grand Prix Final	2; 66.64	4; 113.04	3; 179.68
11–14 September 2019	2019 JGP Russia	1; 67.62	1; 117.43	1; 185.05
28–31 August 2019	2019 JGP United States	2; 58.66	2; 112.53	2; 171.19
2018–19 season
Date	Event	SP	FS	Total
6–9 December 2018	2018–19 JGP Final	4; 62.04	4; 110.47	4; 172.51
26–29 September 2018	2018 JGP Czech Republic	2; 66.01	1; 118.72	1; 184.73
22–25 August 2018	2018 JGP Slovakia	2; 60.14	3; 113.10	3; 173.24
2017–18 season
Date	Event	SP	FS	Total
23–26 January 2018	2018 Russian Junior Championships	5; 60.01	4; 112.41	6; 172.42
6–9 September 2017	2017 JGP Latvia	6; 46.26	6; 83.27	6; 129.53
2016–2017 season
Date	Event	SP	FS	Total
9–13 November 2016	2016 Volvo Open Cup	2; 54.51	2; 88.06	2; 142.57
31 August – 3 September 2016	2016 JGP Czech Republic	7; 48.55	7; 88.80	7; 137.35
