= Csárdás (Monti) =

1904 concert piece written by Vittorio Monti

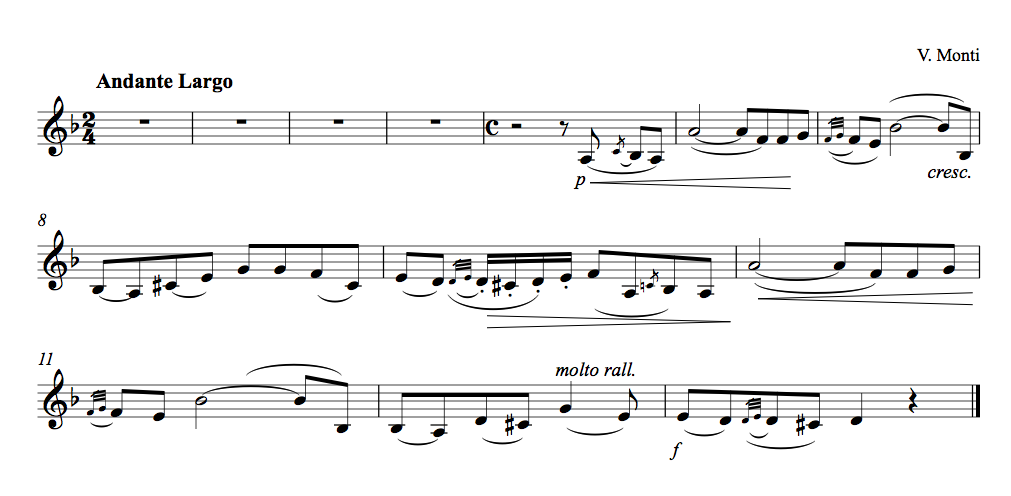
The first 13 bars of "Csárdás"

Csárdás
Abridged version performed by the United States Air Force Band

"Csárdás" (anglicized as "Czardas") is a rhapsodical concert piece by the Italian composer Vittorio Monti. Written in 1904, the folkloric piece is based on a Hungarian csárdás. It was originally composed for violin, mandolin, or piano. There are arrangements for orchestra and for a number of solo instruments. Csárdás is about four-and-a-half minutes in duration.

== Structure ==
Csárdás has seven distinct mini-"movements", or different sections, usually changing in tempo and feeling (and, occasionally, key). The first half of the piece is in D minor; it modulates to D major, then back to D minor, and then finally concludes in D major.

The sections are as follows:

1. Andante – Largo
2. Allegro vivo
3. Molto meno
4. Meno, quasi lento
5. Allegro vivace
6. Allegretto
7. Molto più vivo

It is generally expected for the piece to be played with some rubato. There are also many dynamic changes, ranging from pianissimo to fortissimo. In the Meno, quasi lento section, the violin plays artificial harmonics; this technique involves the musician placing their finger over a note while playing another note, with the finger only just barely pressing onto the string, five semitones higher. This gives the effect of the violin sounding two octaves (24 semitones) higher.

== Published scores ==
- Monti: Czardas per violino e pianoforte. Z. 13 700 (Editio Musica Budapest).
- The Celebrated Czardas by V. Monti F 102595 F (G. Ricordi & Co., London Limited)
