= Vittorio Monti =

Italian composer (1868–1922)

- Born: 6 January 1868; Naples
- Died: 20 June 1922 (aged 54); Naples

Csárdás
Csárdás, performed by The United States Air Force Band

Vittorio Monti (Naples, Italy, 6 January 1868 – Naples, 20 June 1922) was an Italian composer, violinist, mandolinist and conductor. His most famous work is his Csárdás, written around 1904.

== Life and career ==
Monti was born in Naples, where he studied violin and composition at the Conservatorio di San Pietro a Majella. Around 1900, he received an assignment as the conductor for the Lamoureux Orchestra in Paris, where he wrote several ballets and operettas, for example, Noël de Pierrot. He also wrote a method for mandolin, Petite Méthode pour Mandoline, 98049, in which he included some of his works, Perle Brillante, Dans Una Gondola, and Au Petit Jour. There were also works by F. Paolo Tosti.

In Paris, Monti was a significant figure in the Mandolin community. He created the La Stella, a group based around mandolin and guitar works and compositions. This group (under the name of "V. Monti") wrote several pieces and techniques for mandolin students, and started performances from 1908 to 1910. In 1910, Monti created a music journal called Le Mediator, which gave news and instructional guidance to help new mandolin and guitar players. However, this journal dissolved in 1913. He died in 1922.

== Works (Alphabetically) ==
- L' amour veille, mélodie (Milan, G. Ricordi. 1918)
- Aubade à Colombine (1899)
- Aubade d'amour a.d. Mimodrama Pierrots Wiehnachten (Milano: Ricordi 1904)
- Ciao! Célèbre Valse (flute and piano)
- Comme une gavotte (mandolin and piano-or-guitar, publication date unknown)
- Coquetterie for Violin solo accompanied by Piano or Harp and String Quintet (Paris: Ricordi 1913)
- Cortege
- Csárdás (many arrangements, often performed as a violin and piano work. Published by Ricordi of Milan, 1910)
- Défilé Grec for mandolin and piano
- Excelsior : Adaptation musicale pour le cinéma : série de 11 morceaux pour orchestre (Ricordi, ©1915)
- Gentil Bataillon, Marche (Milan: Ricordi)
- Gloria Victis. March for piano (Paris & Milan: Ricordi 1913)
- Grand'-mère qui danse. Gavotte (Milan: Ricordi, ca.1897)
- Janaro
- King pul
- Mam'zelle Fretillon. Comic Opera in 3 acts (Paris: Choudens 1902)
- Mandoline Louis XV
- Marianina, chanson napolitaine (pub. 1918)
- La Marquise et le Berger (for 2 Mandolins or 2 Violins and Guitar)
- Menuet bleu (style Louis 14)
- Menuet rose
- Noël de Pierrot
- Per le brillanti (20th century, date unknown, orchestra)
- Petite Marquise!
- Petite Methode for Mandolin, Op.245 (French) (Paris: Ricordi)
- Ping-pong
- Pour elle! (tempo de gavotte) (Ricordi. ca.1899?)
- Rondino for mandolin
- Sérénade-barcarolle
- Sous le soleil : Idylle pour violon et piano (pub. Ricordi, 1922)
- Stacaltern
- Tant que la femme aura de jolis yeux (forms the motif of the song—Take me in your arms and say you love me—for piano)
- Vanessa
- A Venise Furlana for piano (Paris: Ricordi 1914)
- Vision Champetre
- Zingaresca Morceau de Concert for Violin and piano (Paris: Ricordi 1912)
