= 2019 CS Asian Open Figure Skating Trophy =

Figure skating competition

2019 CS Asian Open Trophy
- Type: ISU Challenger Series
- Date: October 30 – November 3
- Season: 2019–20
- Location: Dongguan, China
- Host: Hong Kong Skating Union
- Venue: Ice Star Ice Rink

Champions
- Men's singles: (Italy) Daniel Grassl
- Ladies' singles: (South Korea) Lim Eun-soo
- Ice dance: (United States) Christina Carreira / Anthony Ponomarenko
- Previous: 2019 CS Ice Star
- Next: 2019 CS Warsaw Cup

The 2019 CS Asian Open Figure Skating Trophy was held in November 2019 in Dongguan, China. It was part of the 2019–20 ISU Challenger Series. Medals were awarded in men's singles, ladies' singles, and ice dance.

The International Skating Union announced on July 22, 2019 that the Asian Open Figure Skating Trophy would replace the canceled Asian Open Figure Skating Classic on the same dates.

== Entries ==
The International Skating Union published the full list of entries on October 3, 2019.

| Country | Men | Ladies | Ice dance |
|---|---|---|---|
| Australia | Jordan Dodds; Charlton Doherty; James Min | Ashley Colliver; Kailani Craine | Matilda Friend / William Badaoui |
| China | Peng Zhiming | Zhang Yixuan | Ning Wanqi / Wang Chao; Ren Junfei / Alexey Karpushov |
| Chinese Taipei | Tsao Chih-i | Emma Tang | |
| Georgia | | | Maria Kazakova / Georgy Reviya |
| Germany | | | Shari Koch / Christian Nüchtern; Jennifer Urban / Benjamin Steffan |
| Hong Kong | Kwun Hung Leung; Harrison Jon-Yen Wang; Lap Kan Yuen | Cheuk Ka Kahlen Cheung; Hiu Ching Kwong; Yi Christy Leung | |
| Indonesia | | Tasya Putri | |
| Israel | Alexei Bychenko | | |
| Italy | Daniel Grassl | | |
| Japan | | | Misato Komatsubara / Tim Koleto |
| Kazakhstan | | Aiza Mambekova | |
| Malaysia | | Sze Chyi Chew | |
| Mongolia | | Maral-Erdene Gansukh | |
| New Zealand | | Brooke Tamepo | |
| Poland | | | Justyna Plutowska / Jérémie Flemin |
| Russia | | | Ksenia Konkina / Pavel Drozd; Ekaterina Mironova / Evgenii Ustenko |
| South Korea | Byun Se-jong; Cha Young-hyun; Lee Si-hyeong | Kim Ha-nul; Lee Si-won; Lim Eun-soo | |
| United States | Ryan Dunk; Andrew Torgashev | Gabriella Izzo | Christina Carreira / Anthony Ponomarenko |

=== Changes to preliminary assignments ===
| Date | Discipline | Withdrew | Added | Refs |
|---|---|---|---|---|
| October 4 | Men | —N/a | (India) Arun Kumar Rayudu | |
| October 4 | Ladies | (Thailand) Thita Lamsam | —N/a | |
| October 10 | Ladies | (Malaysia) Jia Xin Ng | —N/a | |
| October 10 | Ice dance | (Australia) Chantelle Kerry / Andrew Dodds | —N/a | |
| October 15 | Men | (Chinese Taipei) Yeh Che Yu | —N/a | |
| October 15 | Men | (North Korea) Han Bom-kwang | —N/a | |
| October 15 | Men | (Philippines) Yamato Rowe | —N/a | |
| October 16 | Ladies | (United States) Hanna Harrell | —N/a | |
| October 18 | Men | (India) Arun Kumar Rayudu | —N/a | |
| October 22 | Ladies | (Kazakhstan) Alana Toktarova | —N/a | |

== Results ==
=== Men ===
| Rank | Name | Nation | Total points | SP | | FS | |
|---|---|---|---|---|---|---|---|
| 1 | Daniel Grassl | Italy | 230.08 | 1 | 77.09 | 1 | 152.99 |
| 2 | Andrew Torgashev | United States | 217.54 | 2 | 72.91 | 2 | 144.63 |
| 3 | Ryan Dunk | United States | 199.03 | 4 | 71.56 | 3 | 127.47 |
| 4 | Alexei Bychenko | Israel | 195.03 | 6 | 67.81 | 4 | 127.82 |
| 5 | Lee Si-hyeong | South Korea | 191.18 | 3 | 71.94 | 6 | 119.24 |
| 6 | Byun Se-jong | South Korea | 190.40 | 5 | 70.91 | 5 | 119.49 |
| 7 | Cha Young-hyun | South Korea | 180.95 | 7 | 64.64 | 7 | 116.31 |
| 8 | James Min | Australia | 170.80 | 9 | 57.01 | 8 | 113.79 |
| 9 | Tsao Chih-i | Chinese Taipei | 165.25 | 8 | 63.29 | 9 | 101.96 |
| 10 | Harrison Jon-Yen Wang | Hong Kong | 147.99 | 11 | 52.83 | 10 | 95.16 |
| 11 | Peng Zhiming | China | 140.83 | 14 | 47.91 | 11 | 92.92 |
| 12 | Jordan Dodds | Australia | 139.81 | 12 | 49.53 | 12 | 90.28 |
| 13 | Kwun Hung Leung | Hong Kong | 138.30 | 13 | 49.30 | 13 | 89.00 |
| 14 | Lap Kan Yuen | Hong Kong | 127.93 | 10 | 54.05 | 14 | 73.88 |
| WD | Charlton Doherty | Australia | withdrew from competition | | | | |

=== Ladies ===
| Rank | Name | Nation | Total points | SP | | FS | |
|---|---|---|---|---|---|---|---|
| 1 | Lim Eun-soo | South Korea | 197.63 | 1 | 66.84 | 1 | 130.79 |
| 2 | Kim Ha-nul | South Korea | 177.92 | 3 | 60.04 | 2 | 117.88 |
| 3 | Gabriella Izzo | United States | 169.75 | 2 | 65.30 | 3 | 104.45 |
| 4 | Kailani Craine | Australia | 154.69 | 5 | 52.05 | 4 | 102.64 |
| 5 | Yi Christy Leung | Hong Kong | 151.45 | 4 | 58.34 | 6 | 93.11 |
| 6 | Lee Si-won | South Korea | 142.73 | 9 | 44.67 | 5 | 98.06 |
| 7 | Hiu Ching Kwong | Hong Kong | 134.94 | 7 | 49.08 | 7 | 85.86 |
| 8 | Zhang Yixuan | China | 132.29 | 8 | 47.80 | 8 | 84.49 |
| 9 | Cheuk Ka Kahlen Cheung | Hong Kong | 125.24 | 6 | 51.03 | 10 | 74.21 |
| 10 | Aiza Mambekova | Kazakhstan | 120.18 | 10 | 44.13 | 9 | 76.05 |
| 11 | Tasya Putri | Indonesia | 92.71 | 11 | 28.54 | 11 | 64.17 |
| 12 | Brooke Tamepo | New Zealand | 89.23 | 13 | 27.18 | 12 | 62.05 |
| 13 | Ashley Colliver | Australia | 87.95 | 12 | 28.31 | 13 | 59.64 |
| 14 | Maral-Erdene Gansukh | Mongolia | 77.13 | 15 | 23.75 | 14 | 53.38 |
| 15 | Emma Tang | Chinese Taipei | 72.61 | 16 | 21.74 | 15 | 50.87 |
| 16 | Sze Chyi Chew | Malaysia | 68.81 | 14 | 24.83 | 16 | 43.98 |

=== Ice dance ===
| Rank | Name | Nation | Total points | RD | | FD | |
|---|---|---|---|---|---|---|---|
| 1 | Christina Carreira / Anthony Ponomarenko | United States | 191.55 | 1 | 78.40 | 1 | 113.15 |
| 2 | Ksenia Konkina / Pavel Drozd | Russia | 176.38 | 2 | 70.21 | 3 | 106.17 |
| 3 | Maria Kazakova / Georgy Reviya | Georgia | 174.63 | 3 | 67.68 | 2 | 106.95 |
| 4 | Jennifer Urban / Benjamin Steffan | Germany | 164.18 | 5 | 62.75 | 4 | 101.43 |
| 5 | Shari Koch / Christian Nüchtern | Germany | 159.27 | 4 | 64.10 | 5 | 95.17 |
| 6 | Ning Wanqi / Wang Chao | China | 152.92 | 6 | 62.31 | 7 | 90.61 |
| 7 | Ren Junfei / Alexey Karpushov | China | 151.00 | 7 | 61.17 | 8 | 89.41 |
| 8 | Justyna Plutowska / Jérémie Flemin | Poland | 148.83 | 8 | 55.96 | 6 | 93.79 |
| 9 | Misato Komatsubara / Tim Koleto | Japan | 142.09 | 9 | 55.39 | 9 | 86.70 |
| 10 | Matilda Friend / William Badaoui | Australia | 137.07 | 10 | 54.55 | 10 | 82.52 |
| 11 | Ekaterina Mironova / Evgenii Ustenko | Russia | 122.93 | 11 | 47.65 | 11 | 75.28 |
