= Ksenia Konkina =

Russian ice dancer

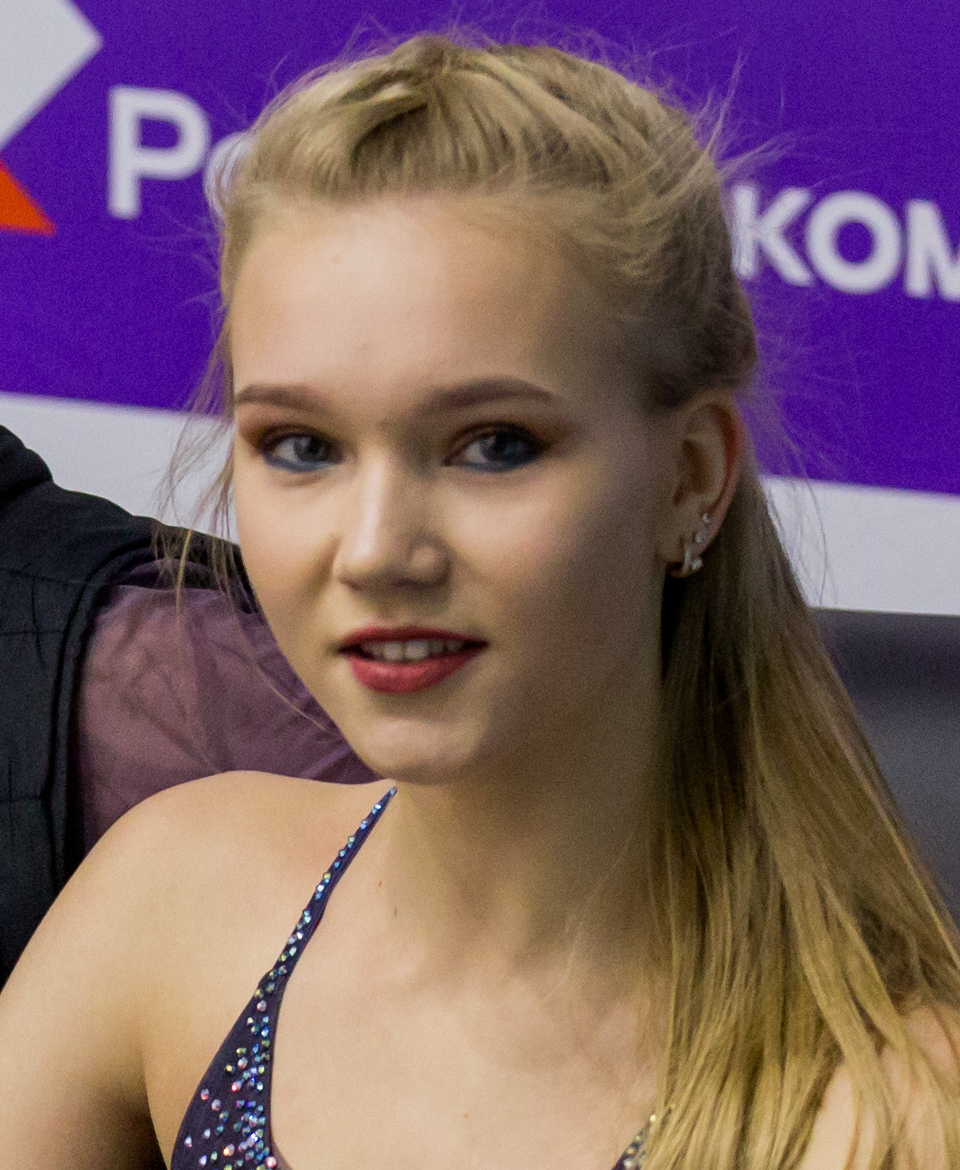

Personal information
- Native name: Ксения Алексеевна Конкина (Russian)
- Full name: Ksenia Alexeevna Konkina
- Born: 5 July 2001 (age 25) Krasnogorsk, Russia
- Height: 1.72 m (5 ft 7 1/2 in)

Figure skating career
- Country: Russia
- Began skating: 2005
- Retired: 2021

Ksenia Alexeevna Konkina (Russian: Ксения Алексеевна Конкина; born 5 July 2001) is a Russian former competitive ice dancer. With her former skating partner, Pavel Drozd, she is the 2019 CS Asian Open Trophy and 2019 CS Warsaw Cup silver medalist.

== Personal life ==
Ksenia Alexeevna Konkina was born on 5 July 2001 in Krasnogorsk, Russia.

== Career ==
=== Early career ===
Konkina began skating in 2005. Early in her career, she competed with Georgy Reviya. Konkina/Reviya placed fourth at 2015 JGP United States and won two junior international medals, at the 2015 Lake Placid Ice Dance International and 2015 Tallinn Trophy.

=== 2016–2017 season ===
Konkina teamed up with Grigory Yakushev in 2016 and won silver at the 2016 Tallinn Trophy. They placed fifth at the 2017 Russian Championships.

=== 2017–2018 season ===
Konkina/Yakushev were assigned to their first Junior Grand Prix events. They won silver at 2017 JGP Austria and bronze at 2017 JGP Croatia. Konkina/Yakushev placed sixth at the 2018 Russian Championships.

=== 2018–2019 season ===
Konkina teamed up with Alexander Vakhnov ahead of the season and moved to train with him under Svetlana Liapina in Moscow. They won bronze in their only international competition, 2018 JGP Canada, together.

Pavel Drozd announced that he was teaming up with Konkina in November 2018. She moved to Alexander Zhulin's group to train with him. Konkina/Drozd made their international debut at the 2019 Open Ice Mall Cup, where they won the bronze medal.

=== 2019–2020 season ===
Konkina/Drozd opened their season by winning the gold medal at 2019 NRW Trophy in Dortmund, Germany. They then won silver at the 2019 CS Asian Open Trophy behind Christina Carreira / Anthony Ponomarenko of the United States. Konkina/Drozd again won silver at 2019 CS Warsaw Cup, behind France's Marie-Jade Lauriault / Romain Le Gac.

=== 2020–2021 season ===
Konkina/Drozd were scheduled to make their Grand Prix debut at the 2020 Rostelecom Cup, but withdrew. The team split later in the season. Their coach, Alexander Zhulin, announced that Konkina had contracted an unspecified serious illness and its effect on her health prevented her from continuing her career.

== Programs ==
=== With Drozd ===
Season	Rhythm dance	Free dance
2019–2021	Mack the Knife performed by Michael Bublé; Mack and Mabel by Jerry Herman choreo. by Sergei Petukhov	My Brilliant Friend by Max Richter choreo. by Sergei Petukhov

=== With Vakhnov ===
Season	Rhythm dance	Free dance
2018–2019	Tango: Asi se baila el Tango performed by Veronica Verdier; Tango: Tanguera performed by Sexteto Mayor	Spartacus by Aram Khachaturian

=== With Yakushev ===
Season	Short dance	Free dance
2017–2018	Samba: Cuéntame performed by Caribbean Kings Band; Cha cha: Lick It; Samba	El Choclo by Ángel Villoldo

=== With Reviya ===
Season	Short dance	Free dance
2015–2016	Waltz: Ein Wiener Walzer by Karl Jenkins; March	Moonlight (Beethoven cover) by Viper

== Competitive highlights ==
GP: Grand Prix; CS: Challenger Series; JGP: Junior Grand Prix

=== With Drozd ===
International
Event	18–19	19–20	20–21
GP Rostelecom Cup			WD
CS Asian Open Trophy		2nd	
CS Warsaw Cup		2nd	
Ice Mall Cup	3rd		
NRW Trophy		1st	
National
Russian Champ.		8th	WD

=== With Vakhnov ===
International: Junior
Event	2018–19
JGP Canada	3rd

=== With Yakushev ===
International: Junior
Event	2016–17	2017–18
JGP Austria		2nd
JGP Croatia		3rd
Tallinn Trophy	2nd	
National
Russian Junior Champ.	5th	6th

=== With Reviya ===
International: Junior
Event	15–16
JGP United States	4th
Lake Placid IDI	3rd
Tallinn Trophy	2nd

== Detailed results ==
Small medals for short and free programs awarded only at ISU Championships.

=== With Drozd ===
2019–20 season
Date	Event	RD	FD	Total
24–29 December 2019	2020 Russian Championships	9; 69.04	8; 107.17	8; 176.21
14–17 November 2019	2019 CS Warsaw Cup	1; 71.81	2; 106.62	2; 178.43
30 October – 3 November 2019	2019 CS Asian Open Trophy	2; 70.21	3; 106.17	2; 176.38
10–11 August 2019	NRW Trophy	1; 66.81	1; 99.98	1; 166.79
2018–19 season
Date	Event	RD	FD	Total
20–23 February 2019	2019 Open Ice Mall Cup	3; 70.77	3; 101.47	3; 172.24

=== With Vakhnov ===
2018–19 season
Date	Event	RD	FD	Total
12–15 September 2018	2018 JGP Canada	2; 60.34	3; 87.58	3; 147.92

=== With Yakushev ===
2017–18 season
Date	Event	SD	FD	Total
23–26 January 2018	2018 Russian Junior Championships	6; 60.83	5; 85.63	6; 146.46
27–30 September 2017	2017 JGP Croatia	2; 60.16	3; 83.61	3; 143.77
31 August – 2 September 2017	2017 JGP Austria	3; 54.63	2; 85.17	2; 139.80
2016–17 season
1–5 February 2017	2017 Russian Junior Championships	5; 58.84	5; 84.79	5; 143.63
19–25 November 2016	2016 Tallinn Trophy	2; 57.64	2; 86.40	2; 144.04

=== With Reviya ===
2015–16 season
Date	Event	SD	FD	Total
17–22 November 2015	2015 Tallinn Trophy	1; 57.11	3; 75.90	2; 133.01
31 August – 2 September 2015	2016 JGP United States	5; 52.95	4; 76.06	4; 129.01
30–31 July 2015	2015 Lake Placid Ice Dance International			3; 128.80
