= Georgy Reviya =

Russian-Georgian ice dancer (born 1999)

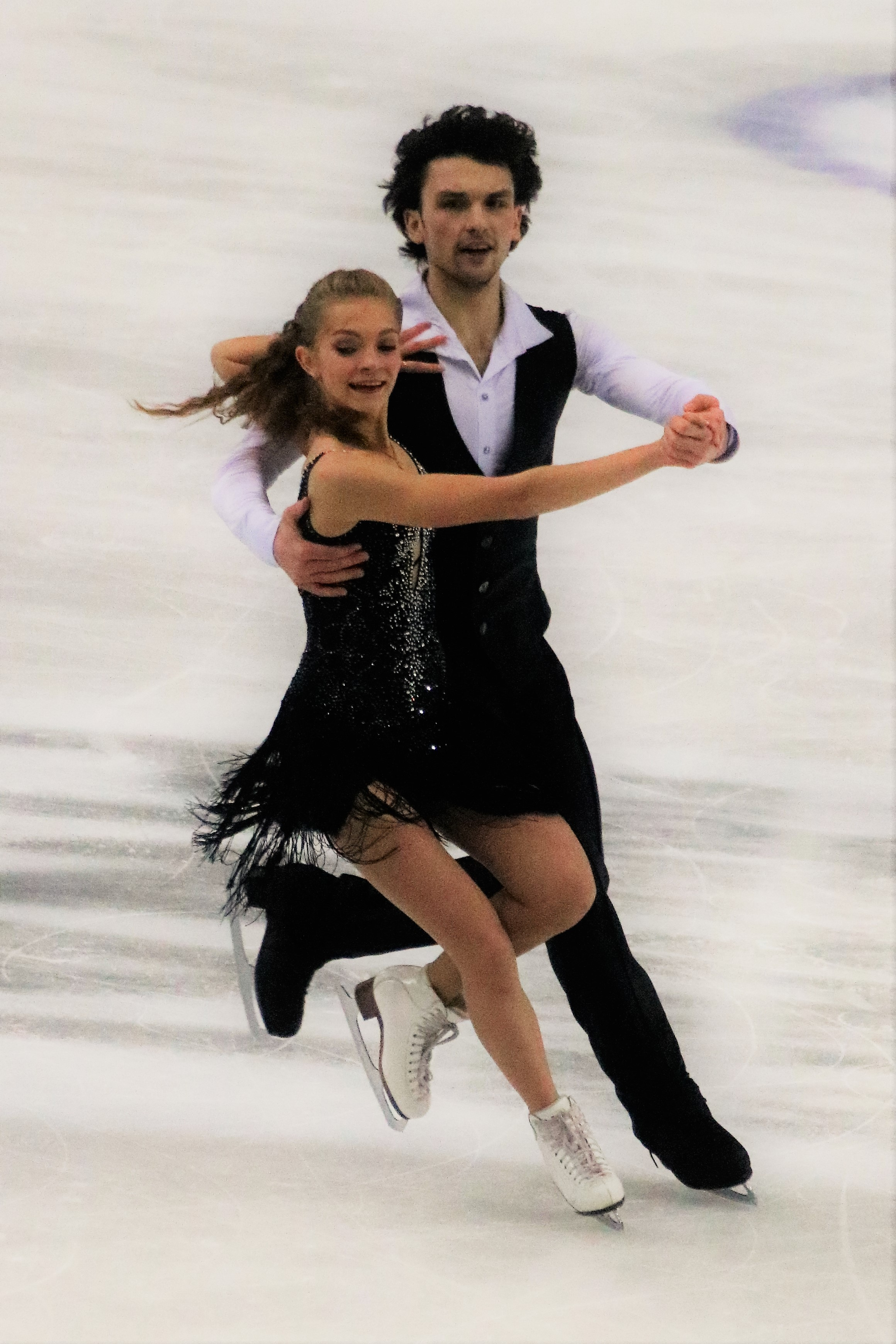
- Kazakova/Reviya at the 2019–20 Junior Grand Prix Final

Personal information
- Native name: Георгий Ноевич Ревия
- Born: 3 April 1999 (age 27) Odintsovo, Russia
- Home town: Tbilisi, Georgia
- Height: 1.84 m (6 ft 0 in)

Figure skating career
- Country: (Georgia (country)) Georgia
- Coach: Matteo Zanni, Barbora Řezníčková, Denis Lodola
- Skating club: Balashikha SC
- Began skating: 2003
Medal record
Representing Georgia
Figure skating: Ice dance
World Junior Championships
Silver medal – second place	2020 Tallinn	Ice dance
Junior Grand Prix Final
Gold medal – first place	2019–20 Turin	Ice dance

Georgy Noevich Reviya (Russian: Георгий Ноевич Ревия, Georgian: გიორგი ნოეს ძე რევია, born 3 April 1999) is a Russian-Georgian ice dancer who competes for Georgia. With his former partner Maria Kazakova, he is a three-time ISU Challenger Series bronze medalist.

On the junior level, he is the 2020 World Junior silver medalist, the 2019 Junior Grand Prix Final champion, the 2019 JGP Croatia champion, the 2018 Toruń Cup champion, the 2019 NRW Trophy champion and the 2018 Volvo Open Cup champion.

== Personal life ==
Reviya was born on 3 April 1999 in Odintsovo, Russia. He is of Georgian heritage and holds dual Russian and Georgian citizenship. Reviya currently studies business management at university and hopes to open a skating school in Georgia one day.

== Career ==
=== Early years ===
Reviya began learning to skate in 2003 at the age of four. He previously competed with Eva Khachaturian for Georgia and Ksenia Konkina for Russia.

=== 2017–2018 season ===
In 2017, Reviya teamed up with Maria Kazakova to compete for Georgia. During the 2017–2018 season, the team appeared at four international events – the Toruń Cup, the Golden Spin of Zagreb, the Santa Claus Cup, and the Tallinn Trophy. In March, they placed ninth at the 2018 World Junior Championships in Sofia, Bulgaria.

=== 2018–2019 season ===
Kazakova/Reviya made their ISU Junior Grand Prix (JGP) debut in September at the 2018 JGP Czech Republic. They finished second in both the rhythm dance and the free dance to earn the silver medal overall behind Russian gold medalists Elizaveta Khudaiberdieva / Nikita Nazarov and ahead of Russian bronze medalists Davis/Smolkin.

At their next Junior Grand Prix event, in Armenia, Kazakova/Reviya placed second in both segments, behind Russia's Ushakova/Nekrasov, and received another silver medal. They set a new personal best score of 65.42 in the rhythm dance. They became the first ice dancers representing Georgia to qualify to a Junior Grand Prix Final, where they finished sixth.

Kazakova/Reviya concluded the season at the 2019 World Junior Championships, where they placed sixth. Reviya called their performance there "not our season’s best, but the best skate of the season. There were some technical mistakes, and we’ll work on them, but I’m happy my partner and I are moving in the right direction."

=== 2019–2020 season: Senior debut and World Junior silver medalists ===
Kazakova/Reviya began their season in early September at the 2019 JGP Latvia. Though they won the free dance at this event by a little under two points, they placed second overall behind the Russian team and training mates Khudaiberdieva/ Filatov by about 0.3 points after being at a deficit after the rhythm dance. Despite missing gold, the team set new personal bests in the free dance and overall at the event. At their second assignment, 2019 JGP Croatia, Kazakova/Reviya earned their first Junior Grand Prix title, taking first place by a 15-point margin over Russian silver medalists Tyutyunina/Shustitskiy. The team set new personal bests in both the rhythm dance and the free dance as well as overall, and with their win qualified for the Junior Grand Prix Final for the second season in a row.

Kazakova/Reviya made their senior international debut in early November 2019 at the 2019 CS Asian Open Figure Skating Trophy. The team placed third in the rhythm dance and second in the free dance to finish third overall behind the American team Carreira/Ponomarenko and Russian team (including Reviya's former partner) Konkina/Drozd. The pair also set new personal bests in all three segments at the event. Days later, Kazakova/Reviya competed in the senior category again at the 2019 Volvo Open Cup in Riga, Latvia. They placed second in both the rhythm dance and the free dance behind the Russian team Shevchenko/Eremenko to win the silver medal overall.

In December 2019, Kazakova/Reviya returned to the junior level to compete at the 2019–20 Junior Grand Prix Final in Turin, Italy. The team took the lead in the rhythm dance by just a 0.04 point margin over the American team Nguyen/Kolesnik and again set a new personal best (68.76). After their performance, Reviya remarked, "It wasn't easy today. We are very happy with our marks, but not so happy with the skate," citing a few minor technical errors that the team will look to work on moving forward. On splitting their season between the junior and senior circuit, Reviya further added, "It's hard, so hard! But the free dance in juniors is easier after skating in seniors." During the following day of competition, Kazakova/Reviya continued their momentum from the rhythm dance by placing first in the free dance by a 0.12 point margin over the Americans to capture their first Junior Grand Prix Final title. Their win marks the first Junior Grand Prix Final victory by an entrant from Georgia in any discipline. After their win, Kazakova stated, "It's a great pleasure for us just to skate and especially to skate for Georgia."

In January 2020, Kazakova/Reviya competed at the 2020 European Championships, their first senior ISU championship. The team placed twelfth in the rhythm dance, scoring just shy of their personal best score and qualifying for the free dance. The couple fell to fourteenth place in the free dance and ultimately ranked fourteenth overall.

Kazakova/Reviya next competed in early March 2020 at the 2020 World Junior Figure Skating Championships in Tallinn, Estonia. The team set a new personal best in the rhythm dance and finished second in the segment behind Russian team Shanaeva/Naryzhnyy and ahead of American rivals Nguyen/Kolesnik. In the free dance, Kazakova/Reviya outscored Shanaeva/Naryzhnyy, but were overtaken by Nguyen/Kolesnik, leaving the team once again in second in the segment and second overall. Their silver medal marks Georgia's first ISU championship medal in ice dance.

They had been assigned to make their senior World Championship debut in Montreal, but these were cancelled as a result of the coronavirus pandemic.

=== 2020–2021 season ===
Kazakova/Reviya were assigned to make their Grand Prix debut at the 2020 Rostelecom Cup, but withdrew. Later in the season, the team was assigned to the 2021 World Championships, but withdrew prior to the publication of the entry list due to health issues.

=== 2021–2022 season: Beijing Olympics ===
Kazakova/Reviya returned to competition after a season away due to injury at the 2021 CS Nebelhorn Trophy, attempting to qualify a berth for Georgia in ice dance at the 2022 Winter Olympics. They placed fifth in the rhythm dance due primarily to a mistake made by Reviya on their third set of twizzles but were able to remain in contention for Olympic qualification. In the free dance, Kazakova/Reviya came back with a stronger performance to finish second in the segment, scoring just shy of their personal best and finishing third overall to successfully qualify for a spot in their discipline for Georgia at the Olympic Games.

At their next assignment, the 2021 Mezzaluna Cup, Kazakova/Reviya placed first in both segments of competition to take the title by a 15-point margin over Australian silver medalists Kerry/Dodds. They were scheduled to compete at the 2021 CS Cup of Austria, the 2021 CS Warsaw Cup, and the 2021 Rostelecom Cup, but withdrew from all three events due to injury. Due to equipment issues, the team also skipped the 2022 European Championships in January.

Kazakova/Reviya began the 2022 Winter Olympics as the Georgian entries to the rhythm dance segment of the Olympic team event. They placed eighth in the segment, taking three points for the Georgian team. Ultimately the team did not advance to the second phase of the competition and finished sixth. In the dance event, Kazakova/Reviya were eighteenth in the rhythm dance, qualifying for the free dance. Nineteenth in the free dance, they finished nineteenth overall.

The team concluded the season at the 2022 World Championships, held in Montpellier with Russian dance teams absent due to the International Skating Union banning all Russian athletes due to their country's invasion of Ukraine. They finished fifteenth.

Following the season, Kazakova/Reviya relocated to Bolzano, Italy to train with Matteo Zanni, Barbora Řezníčková, and Denis Lodola becoming their new coaching team.

=== 2022–2023 season ===
Before the start of the 2022–23 season, Kazakova and Reviya left Russia and long-time coaches Denis Samokhin and Maria Borovikova and relocated to Egna, Italy to train under Matteo Zanni and Barbora Řezníčková. They said that training outside Russia would be beneficial in light of the ongoing war in Ukraine.

Kazakova broke her hand in the preseason, resulting in them missing two months of training and having to withdraw from two early events. Kazakova/Reviya opened their season by making their ISU Grand Prix debut at the 2022 Grand Prix de France in November. They placed sixth in both the rhythm and free dance to finish sixth overall. They were sixth as well at the 2022 MK John Wilson Trophy the following weekend.

In their second appearance at the European Championships, Kazakova/Reviya finished eighth. They came thirteenth at the 2023 World Championships.

=== 2023–2024 season ===
Kazakova/Reviya won the bronze medal at the 2023 CS Lombardia Trophy to start the competitive season, before finishing sixth at the 2023 CS Nebelhorn Trophy. On the Grand Prix, they were seventh at the 2023 Cup of China. Reviya said they were happy with their performance, noting that his "health condition is not that good."

In April, Kazakova announced that she and Reviya had split.

== Programs ==
=== With Kazakova ===
Season	Rhythm dance	Free dance	Exhibition
2023–2024	A Kind of Magic; Save Me; I Want to Break Free; Need Your Loving Tonight by Queen choreo. by Matteo Zanni	Schindler's List by John Williams choreo. by Matteo Zanni	
2022–2023	Samba: Squid Samba by Alessandro Olivato; Rhumba: Hello by Adele; Samba: 1 to 8 by Brian Sessarego choreo. by Matteo Zanni	Mad World by Tears for Fears performed by 2WEI, Tommee Profitt, and Fleurie choreo. by Matteo Zanni	Dream by Imagine Dragons
2021–2022	Blues: Chosen One by Valley of Wolves; Hip Hop: Yeah! by Usher, feat. Lil Jon and Ludacris choreo. by Nikolai Nikonov	Dummy (from Saw II) by Charlie Clouser; Texas Gypsy Massacre; Mephisto's Lullaby by Xtortion Audio choreo. by Nikolai Nikonov	In the End by Linkin Park performed by Tommee Profitt, feat. Fleurie and Jung Youth choreo. by Elena Sokolova
2020–2021	Did not compete this season		
2019–2020	Quickstep: Take Good Care of My Baby (from Beautiful: The Carole King Musical) performed by Jake Epstein and Jessie Mueller; Foxtrot: Dream a Little Dream of Me performed by The Beautiful South; Quickstep: Overture (from Funny Girl)	In the End by Linkin Park performed by Tommee Profitt, feat. Fleurie and Jung Youth choreo. by Elena Sokolova	Gandagan (Georgian Folk Dance) by Cekva Zgaparshi
2018–2019	Argentine Tango: Building the Bullet by Luis Bacalov; Argentine Tango: Assassin's Tango (from Mr. & Mrs. Smith) by John Powell	Carmina Burana by Carl Orff performed by Edvin Marton; Vocalise (from The Ninth Gate) by Wojciech Kilar	Gandagan (Georgian Folk Dance) by Cekva Zgaparshi
	Short dance		
2017–2018	Cha Cha: Unchain My Heart performed by Joe Cocker; Rhumba: Abrázame performed by Tamara	A Time For Us (from Romeo and Juliet) arranged by Henry Mancini; Aimer (from Roméo et Juliette) performed by Damian Sargue and Cécelia Cara	

=== With Khachaturian ===
Season	Short dance	Free dance	Exhibition
2016–2017	Blues: N'oubliez jamais performed by Joe Cocker; Swing: Show Me How You Burlesque (from Burlesque) performed by Christina Aguilera	Spente le Stelle performed by Emma Shapplin; Requiem for a Tower performed by Corner Stone Cues	

=== With Konkina ===
Season	Short dance	Free dance
2015–2016	Waltz, March: Ein Wiener Walzer by Karl Jenkins	Moonlight (Beethoven cover) by Viper

== Records and achievements ==
=== Junior world record scores ===
Kazakova/Reviya are the former junior world record holders for the free dance and total scores.

Junior ice dance combined total records
Date	Score	Event	Note
7 March 2020	176.19	2020 World Junior Championships	Surpassed by Avonley Nguyen / Vadym Kolesnik on 7 March 2020.
Junior ice dance free dance
Date	Score	Event	Note
7 December 2019	106.14	2019–20 Junior Grand Prix Final	Surpassed on 7 March 2020.
7 March 2020	106.21	2020 World Junior Championships	Surpassed by Avonley Nguyen / Vadym Kolesnik on 7 March 2020.

== Competitive highlights ==
CS: Challenger Series; JGP: Junior Grand Prix

=== With Kazakova for Georgia ===
International
Event	17–18	18–19	19–20	21–22	22–23	23–24
Olympics				19th		
Worlds			C	15th	13th	
Europeans			14th	WD	8th	
GP Cup of China						7th
GP France					6th	
GP Wilson Trophy					6th	
CS Asian Open			3rd			
CS Golden Spin				WD	5th	
CS Lombardia						3rd
CS Nebelhorn				3rd		6th
Mezzaluna Cup				1st		
NRW Trophy					1st	
Volvo Open Cup			2nd			
International: Junior
Junior Worlds	9th	6th	2nd			
JGP Final		6th	1st			
JGP Armenia		2nd				
JGP Croatia			1st			
JGP Czech Republic		2nd				
JGP Latvia			2nd			
Golden Spin	2nd					
NRW Trophy			1st			
Santa Claus Cup	3rd					
Tallinn Trophy	5th					
Toruń Cup	1st					
Volvo Open Cup		1st J				
Team events
Olympics				6th T 8th P		
WD = Withdrew; C = Event cancelled

=== With Khachaturian for Georgia ===
International: Junior
Event	16–17
Junior Worlds	18th
Santa Claus Cup	6th

=== With Konkina for Russia ===
International: Junior
Event	2015–16
JGP U.S.	4th
Lake Placid IDI	3rd
Tallinn Trophy	2nd

== Detailed results ==
Small medals for short and free programs awarded only at ISU Championships.

With Kazakova

=== Senior results ===
2023–2024 season
Date	Event	RD	FD	Total
November 10–12, 2023	2023 Cup of China	6; 70.58	6; 108.28	7; 178.66
September 20–23, 2023	2023 CS Nebelhorn Trophy	4; 68.68	6; 107.15	6; 175.83
September 8–10, 2023	2023 CS Lombardia Trophy	3; 70.95	4; 110.04	3; 180.99
2022–2023 season
Date	Event	RD	FD	Total
March 22–26, 2023	2023 World Championships	14; 69.43	12; 111.79	13; 181.22
January 25–29, 2023	2023 European Championships	8; 68.55	8; 107.27	8; 175.82
December 7–10, 2022	2022 CS Golden Spin of Zagreb	5; 68.84	5; 104.59	5; 173.43
November 24–27, 2022	NRW Trophy	1; 74.73	1; 113.65	1; 188.38
November 11–13, 2022	2022 MK John Wilson Trophy	6; 70.71	5; 106.00	6; 176.71
November 4–6, 2022	2022 Grand Prix de France	6; 68.84	7; 104.21	6; 173.05
2021–2022 season
Date	Event	RD	FD	Total
March 21–27, 2022	2022 World Championships	17; 66.76	15; 98.62	15; 165.38
February 12–14, 2022	2022 Winter Olympics	18; 67.08	19; 97.25	19; 164.33
February 4–7, 2022	2022 Winter Olympics – Team event	8; 64.60	—	6T
October 15–17, 2021	2021 Mezzaluna Cup	1; 74.98	1; 111.80	1; 186.78
September 22–25, 2021	2021 CS Nebelhorn Trophy	5; 66.95	2; 106.25	3; 173.20

=== Junior results ===
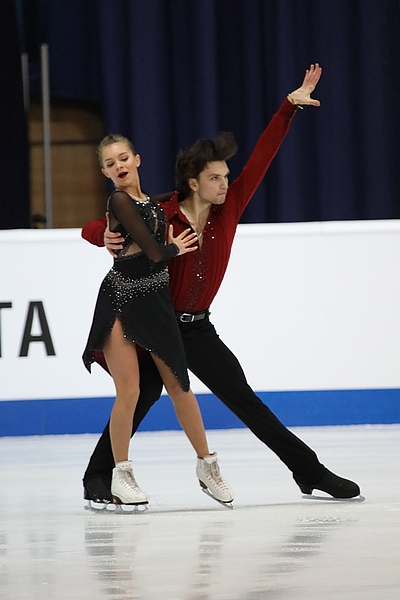
Kazakova/Reviya at the 2019 World Junior Championships

2019–2020 season
Date	Event	Level	RD	FD	Total
2–8 March 2020	2020 World Junior Championships	Junior	2; 69.98	2; 106.21	2; 176.19
20–26 January 2020	2020 European Championships	Senior	12; 67.49	14; 99.73	14; 167.22
5–8 December 2019	2019–20 Junior Grand Prix Final	Junior	1; 68.76	1; 106.14	1; 174.90
5–10 November 2019	2019 Volvo Open Cup	Senior	2; 69.95	2; 112.48	2; 182.43
30 Oct. – 3 Nov. 2019	2019 CS Asian Open Trophy	Senior	3; 67.68	2; 106.95	3; 174.63
25–28 September 2019	2019 JGP Croatia	Junior	1; 65.97	1; 103.25	1; 169.22
4–7 September 2019	2019 JGP Latvia	Junior	2; 63.25	1; 102.01	2; 165.26
9–11 August 2019	2019 NRW Summer Trophy	Junior	1; 59.13	1; 93.95	1; 153.08
2018–2019 season
Date	Event	Level	RD	FD	Total
18–24 March 2019	2019 World Junior Championships	Junior	6; 60.08	6; 95.32	6; 155.40
6–9 December 2018	2018–19 Junior Grand Prix Final	Junior	6; 57.51	6; 91.25	6; 148.76
7–11 November 2018	2018 Volvo Open Cup	Junior	1; 67.04	1; 100.26	1; 167.30
10–13 October 2018	2018 JGP Armenia	Junior	2; 65.42	2; 99.23	2; 164.65
26–29 September 2018	2018 JGP Czech Republic	Junior	2; 59.77	2; 94.40	2; 154.17
2017–2018 season
Date	Event	Level	SD	FD	Total
5–11 March 2018	2018 World Junior Championships	Junior	11; 54.95	8; 78.12	9; 133.07
30 Jan. – 4 Feb. 2018	2018 Toruń Cup	Junior	1; 56.44	1; 75.63	1; 132.07
6–9 December 2017	2017 Golden Spin of Zagreb	Junior	2; 58.70	2; 79.02	2; 137.72
4–10 December 2017	2017 Santa Claus Cup	Junior	4; 52.44	3; 75.15	3; 127.59
20–26 November 2017	2017 Tallinn Trophy	Junior	4; 54.86	8; 70.10	5; 124.96

World Junior Record Holders
Preceded by (Canada) Marjorie Lajoie / Zachary Lagha	Junior Free Dance; 7 December 2019 – 7 March 2020	Succeeded by (United States) Avonley Nguyen / Vadym Kolesnik
Preceded by (Canada) Marjorie Lajoie / Zachary Lagha	Junior Total Score; 7 March 2020	Succeeded by (United States) Avonley Nguyen / Vadym Kolesnik
