= Tina Wang =

Chinese-Australian former competitive figure skater

Personal information
- Born: 13 December 1991 (age 34) Qiqihar, China
- Home town: Brisbane, Australia
- Height: 160 cm (5.2 ft)

Figure skating career
- Country: Australia
- Coach: Chang Yuan Wang, Hui Ma
- Skating club: IceWorld FSC Brisbane
- Retired: 2010

Tina Wang (born 13 December 1991) is a Chinese-Australian former competitive figure skater. She became the Australian national champion in the 2008–09 season and qualified to the free skate at two Four Continents Championships.

== Personal life ==
Tina Wang was born in Qiqihar to Chang Yuan "Andrew" Wang and Hui "Helen" Ma, who were both national team coaches in China before the family moved to Australia. They settled in Sunnybank Hills. She is the cousin of Chinese ice dancer Zhang Weina. She is the aunty of three kids. Mia Zeng, Mike Zeng and Michelle Zeng. Those kids are Weina's children.

== Career ==
Wang was coached by her parents in Brisbane. Her junior international debut came in October 2005 at a Junior Grand Prix event in Japan. She won the Australian national junior title and went on to compete at the 2006 World Junior Championships in Ljubljana, Slovenia, finishing 26th.

During the next two seasons, Wang won silver on the senior level at the Australian Championships. Her first senior international competition was the 2008 Four Continents Championships in Goyang, South Korea. Ranked 21st in the short program, she advanced to the free skate and finished 19th overall.

In the 2008–09 season, Wang became the Australian national senior champion. She finished 18th at the 2009 Four Continents Championships in Vancouver, British Columbia, Canada, after placing 18th in the short and 17th in the free skate.

== Programs ==
Season	Short program	Free skating
2008–09	Korobushka by Bond	Schindler's List by John Williams
2007–08	Introduction and Rondo Capriccioso by Camille Saint-Saëns	Violin Fantasy on Puccini's Turandot performed by Vanessa-Mae
2006–07	Song from a Secret Garden by Secret Garden	Malagueña by Ernesto Lecuona
2005–06	Love Story by Francis Lai	Malagueña by Ernesto Lecuona

== Competitive highlights ==
JGP: Junior Grand Prix

International
Event	05–06	06–07	07–08	08–09	09–10
Worlds			37th		
Four Continents			19th	18th	
International: Junior
Junior Worlds	26th	31st			
JGP Japan	16th				
National
Australian Champs.		2nd	2nd	1st	2nd
Australian Junior Champs.	1st	1st			
