= Francis Rigby =

Australian retired ice dancer (born 1973)

Personal information
- Born: 21 March 1973 (age 53)
- Height: 178 cm (5 ft 10 in)

Figure skating career
- Country: Australia
- Partner: Portia Duval-Rigby
- Skating club: Iceworld Skating Club
- Retired: 2001

Francis Rigby (born 21 March 1973 in Stockport, England) is an Australian retired ice dancer. With his wife Portia Duval-Rigby, he is a two time Australian Champion. They were married in 1997. The Rigbys were coached by Helen Ma and Svetlana Liapina. Their highest placement at an ISU Championship was 12th at the 1999 and 2001 Four Continents Championships.

Rigby previously skated with Krystal Lee. He is an economist.

== Competitive highlights ==
(with Rigby)

Event	1998-99	1999-00	2000-01
World Championships		32nd	32nd
Four Continents Championships	12th	13th	12th
Australian Championships	2nd	1st	1st
Golden Spin of Zagreb	9th	9th	
Karl Schäfer Memorial		9th	
Nebelhorn Trophy			12th
Ondrej Nepela Memorial		7th	
