= 2018–19 Grand Prix of Figure Skating Final =

2018–19 Grand Prix Final
- Type: Grand Prix
- Date: 6 – 9 December 2018
- Season: 2018–19
- Location: Vancouver, British Columbia, Canada
- Host: Skate Canada
- Venue: Doug Mitchell Thunderbird Sports Centre

Champions
- Men's singles: (United States) Nathan Chen (S) (Canada) Stephen Gogolev (J)
- Ladies' singles: (Japan) Rika Kihira (S) (Russia) Alena Kostornaia (J)
- Pairs: (France) Vanessa James / Morgan Ciprès (S) (Russia) Anastasia Mishina / Aleksandr Galiamov (J)
- Ice dance: (United States) Madison Hubbell / Zachary Donohue (S) (Russia) Sofia Shevchenko / Igor Eremenko (J)
- Previous: 2017–18 Grand Prix Final
- Next: 2019–20 Grand Prix Final
- Previous Grand Prix: 2018 Internationaux de France
- Next Grand Prix: 2019 Skate America

The 2018–19 Grand Prix of Figure Skating Final and ISU Junior Grand Prix Final took place from 6 to 9 December 2018 at the Doug Mitchell Thunderbird Sports Centre in Vancouver, British Columbia, Canada. The combined event was the culmination of two international series — the Grand Prix of Figure Skating and the Junior Grand Prix. Medals were awarded in the disciplines of men's singles, ladies' singles, pair skating, and ice dancing on the senior and junior levels.

== Qualifiers ==
=== Senior-level qualifiers ===
	Men	Ladies	Pairs	Ice dance
1	~~(Japan) Yuzuru Hanyu~~ (withdrew)	(Russia) Alina Zagitova	(France) Vanessa James / Morgan Ciprès	(United States) Madison Hubbell / Zachary Donohue
2	(Japan) Shoma Uno	(Japan) Rika Kihira	(Russia) Evgenia Tarasova / Vladimir Morozov	(Russia) Alexandra Stepanova / Ivan Bukin
3	(United States) Nathan Chen	(Japan) Satoko Miyahara	(Russia) Natalia Zabiiako / Alexander Enbert	(Russia) Victoria Sinitsina / Nikita Katsalapov
4	(Czech Republic) Michal Březina	(Russia) Elizaveta Tuktamysheva	(China) Peng Cheng / Jin Yang	(Italy) Charlène Guignard / Marco Fabbri
5	(Russia) Sergei Voronov	(Japan) Kaori Sakamoto	(Italy) Nicole Della Monica / Matteo Guarise	(United States) Kaitlin Hawayek / Jean-Luc Baker
6	(South Korea) Cha Jun-hwan	(Russia) Sofia Samodurova	(Russia) Daria Pavliuchenko / Denis Khodykin	(Russia) Tiffany Zahorski / Jonathan Guerreiro
Alternates
1st	(Canada) Keegan Messing (called up)	(Japan) Mai Mihara	(Russia) Alisa Efimova / Alexander Korovin	(Spain) Sara Hurtado / Kirill Khaliavin
2nd	(Russia) Alexander Samarin	(Russia) Stanislava Konstantinova	(United States) Tarah Kayne / Danny O'Shea	(Canada) Piper Gilles / Paul Poirier
3rd	(Italy) Matteo Rizzo	(Russia) Evgenia Medvedeva	(Canada) Kirsten Moore-Towers / Michael Marinaro	(United States) Lorraine McNamara / Quinn Carpenter

=== Junior-level qualifiers ===
	Men	Ladies	Pairs	Ice dance
1	(Russia) Petr Gumennik	(Russia) Alexandra Trusova	(Russia) Anastasia Mishina / Aleksandr Galiamov	(Russia) Arina Ushakova / Maxim Nekrasov
2	(United States) Camden Pulkinen	(Russia) Alena Kostornaia	(Russia) Polina Kostiukovich / Dmitrii Ialin	(Russia) Elizaveta Khudaiberdieva / Nikita Nazarov
3	(France) Adam Siao Him Fa	(Russia) Anna Shcherbakova	(Russia) Kseniia Akhanteva / Valerii Kolesov	(United States) Avonley Nguyen / Vadym Kolesnik
4	(United States) Tomoki Hiwatashi	(Russia) Anastasia Tarakanova	(Russia) Apollinariia Panfilova / Dmitry Rylov	(Russia) Sofia Shevchenko / Igor Eremenko
5	~~(United States) Andrew Torgashev~~ (withdrew)	(South Korea) Kim Ye-lim	(Russia) Anastasia Poluianova / Dmitry Sopot	(Canada) Marjorie Lajoie / Zachary Lagha
6	(Japan) Koshiro Shimada	(Russia) Alena Kanysheva	(United States) Sarah Feng / TJ Nyman	(Georgia (country)) Maria Kazakova / Georgy Reviya
Alternates
1st	(Canada) Stephen Gogolev (called up)	(Russia) Anna Tarusina	(United States) Laiken Lockley / Keenan Prochnow	(Russia) Polina Ivanenko / Daniil Karpov
2nd	(Russia) Kirill Iakovlev	(South Korea) You Young	(Japan) Riku Miura / Shoya Ichihashi	(Russia) Elizaveta Shanaeva / Devid Naryzhnyy
3rd	(Japan) Yuma Kagiyama	(Japan) Rion Sumiyoshi	(Canada) Patricia Andrew / Paxton Fletcher	(Ukraine) Darya Popova / Volodymyr Byelikov

=== Changes to preliminary qualifiers ===
Date	Discipline	Withdrew	Added	Reason/Other notes	Refs
November 12	Junior men	(United States) Andrew Torgashev	(Canada) Stephen Gogolev	Injury	
November 29	Senior men	(Japan) Yuzuru Hanyu	(Canada) Keegan Messing	Injury	

== Records ==
The following new ISU best scores were set during this competition:

Event	Component	Skater(s)	Score	Date	Ref
Junior pairs	Short program	(Russia) Apollinariia Panfilova / Dmitry Rylov	66.44	6 December 2018	
Junior pairs	Short program	(Russia) Polina Kostiukovich / Dmitrii Ialin	66.84	6 December 2018	
Junior ladies	Short program	(Russia) Alena Kostornaia	76.32	6 December 2018	
Ladies	Short program	(Japan) Rika Kihira	82.51	6 December 2018	
Junior men	Free skating	(Canada) Stephen Gogolev	154.76	7 December 2018	
Junior men	Total score	(Canada) Stephen Gogolev	233.58	7 December 2018	
Junior pairs	Free skating	(Russia) Anastasia Mishina / Aleksandr Galiamov	126.26	8 December 2018	
Junior pairs	Total score	(Russia) Anastasia Mishina / Aleksandr Galiamov	190.63	8 December 2018	
Pairs	Free skating	(France) Vanessa James / Morgan Ciprès	148.37	8 December 2018	

== Medalists ==
=== Senior ===
Discipline	Gold	Silver	Bronze
Men	(United States) Nathan Chen	(Japan) Shoma Uno	(South Korea) Cha Jun-hwan
Ladies	(Japan) Rika Kihira	(Russia) Alina Zagitova	(Russia) Elizaveta Tuktamysheva
Pairs	(France) Vanessa James / Morgan Ciprès	(China) Peng Cheng / Jin Yang	(Russia) Evgenia Tarasova / Vladimir Morozov
Ice dancing	(United States) Madison Hubbell / Zachary Donohue	(Russia) Victoria Sinitsina / Nikita Katsalapov	(Italy) Charlène Guignard / Marco Fabbri

=== Junior ===
Discipline	Gold	Silver	Bronze
Men	(Canada) Stephen Gogolev	(Russia) Petr Gumennik	(Japan) Koshiro Shimada
Ladies	(Russia) Alena Kostornaia	(Russia) Alexandra Trusova	(Russia) Alena Kanysheva
Pairs	(Russia) Anastasia Mishina / Aleksandr Galiamov	(Russia) Polina Kostiukovich / Dmitrii Ialin	(Russia) Apollinariia Panfilova / Dmitry Rylov
Ice dancing	(Russia) Sofia Shevchenko / Igor Eremenko	(Russia) Arina Ushakova / Maxim Nekrasov	(Russia) Elizaveta Khudaiberdieva / Nikita Nazarov

== Medals table ==
=== Senior ===
Rank	Nation	Gold	Silver	Bronze	Total
1	United States (USA)	2	0	0	2
2	Japan (JPN)	1	1	0	2
3	France (FRA)	1	0	0	1
4	Russia (RUS)	0	2	2	4
5	China (CHN)	0	1	0	1
6	Italy (ITA)	0	0	1	1
6	South Korea (KOR)	0	0	1	1
Totals (7 entries)		4	4	4	12

=== Junior ===
Rank	Nation	Gold	Silver	Bronze	Total
1	Russia (RUS)	3	4	3	10
2	Canada (CAN)	1	0	0	1
3	Japan (JPN)	0	0	1	1
Totals (3 entries)		4	4	4	12

== Senior-level results ==
=== Men ===
Rank	Name	Nation	Total points	SP		FS	
1	Nathan Chen	United States	282.42	1	92.99	1	189.42
2	Shoma Uno	Japan	275.10	2	91.67	2	183.43
3	Cha Jun-hwan	South Korea	263.49	4	89.07	3	174.42
4	Michal Březina	Czech Republic	255.26	3	89.21	4	166.05
5	Keegan Messing	Canada	236.05	6	79.56	5	156.49
6	Sergei Voronov	Russia	226.44	5	82.96	6	143.48

=== Ladies ===
Rank	Name	Nation	Total points	SP		FS	
1	Rika Kihira	Japan	233.12	1	82.51	1	150.61
2	Alina Zagitova	Russia	226.53	2	77.93	2	148.60
3	Elizaveta Tuktamysheva	Russia	215.32	3	70.65	3	144.67
4	Kaori Sakamoto	Japan	211.68	4	70.23	4	141.45
5	Sofia Samodurova	Russia	204.33	5	68.24	5	136.09
6	Satoko Miyahara	Japan	201.31	6	67.52	6	133.79

=== Pairs ===
Rank	Name	Nation	Total points	SP		FS	
1	Vanessa James / Morgan Ciprès	France	219.88	4	71.51	1	148.37
2	Peng Cheng / Jin Yang	China	216.90	1	75.69	2	141.21
3	Evgenia Tarasova / Vladimir Morozov	Russia	214.20	3	74.04	3	140.16
4	Natalia Zabiiako / Alexander Enbert	Russia	201.07	2	75.18	4	125.89
5	Nicole Della Monica / Matteo Guarise	Italy	187.63	5	69.77	6	117.86
6	Daria Pavliuchenko / Denis Khodykin	Russia	186.81	6	61.24	5	125.57

=== Ice dancing ===
Rank	Name	Nation	Total points	RD		FD	
1	Madison Hubbell / Zachary Donohue	United States	205.35	1	80.53	1	124.82
2	Victoria Sinitsina / Nikita Katsalapov	Russia	201.37	3	77.33	2	124.04
3	Charlène Guignard / Marco Fabbri	Italy	198.65	2	78.30	3	120.35
4	Alexandra Stepanova / Ivan Bukin	Russia	196.72	4	77.20	4	119.52
5	Tiffani Zagorski / Jonathan Guerreiro	Russia	184.37	5	72.98	6	111.39
6	Kaitlin Hawayek / Jean-Luc Baker	United States	184.04	6	71.33	5	112.71

== Junior-level results ==
=== Men ===
Rank	Name	Nation	Total points	SP		FS	
1	Stephen Gogolev	Canada	233.58	2	78.82	1	154.76
2	Petr Gumennik	Russia	218.75	3	76.16	2	142.59
3	Koshiro Shimada	Japan	214.38	4	73.97	4	140.41
4	Adam Siao Him Fa	France	207.04	5	66.48	3	140.56
5	Camden Pulkinen	United States	197.68	1	80.31	6	117.37
6	Tomoki Hiwatashi	United States	190.80	6	62.48	5	128.32

=== Ladies ===
Rank	Name	Nation	Total points	SP		FS	
1	Alena Kostornaia	Russia	217.98	1	76.32	1	141.66
2	Alexandra Trusova	Russia	215.20	2	74.43	2	140.77
3	Alena Kanysheva	Russia	198.14	3	68.66	3	129.48
4	Anastasia Tarakanova	Russia	190.46	5	61.78	4	128.68
5	Anna Shcherbakova	Russia	181.83	6	56.26	5	125.57
6	Kim Ye-lim	South Korea	177.91	4	62.51	6	115.40

=== Pairs ===
Rank	Name	Nation	Total points	SP		FS	
1	Anastasia Mishina / Aleksandr Galiamov	Russia	190.63	3	64.37	1	126.26
2	Polina Kostiukovich / Dmitrii Ialin	Russia	189.53	1	66.84	2	122.69
3	Apollinariia Panfilova / Dmitry Rylov	Russia	186.59	2	66.44	3	120.15
4	Kseniia Akhanteva / Valerii Kolesov	Russia	172.51	4	62.04	4	110.47
5	Anastasia Poluianova / Dmitry Sopot	Russia	158.33	5	59.28	5	99.05
WD	Sarah Feng / TJ Nyman	United States	withdrew	6	49.82	withdrew from competition	

=== Ice dancing ===
Rank	Name	Nation	Total points	RD		FD	
1	Sofia Shevchenko / Igor Eremenko	Russia	170.66	1	67.73	2	102.93
2	Arina Ushakova / Maxim Nekrasov	Russia	170.65	2	67.49	1	103.16
3	Elizaveta Khudaiberdieva / Nikita Nazarov	Russia	164.54	3	66.29	4	98.25
4	Marjorie Lajoie / Zachary Lagha	Canada	164.51	4	66.25	3	98.26
5	Avonley Nguyen / Vadym Kolesnik	United States	158.47	5	63.73	5	94.74
6	Maria Kazakova / Georgy Reviya	Georgia	148.76	6	57.51	6	91.25
