= Helen Ma (skater) =

Chinese figure skating coach

Personal information
- Full name: Helen Ma
- Other names: Hui Ma
- Born: China

Helen Ma (birth name Hui) is a Chinese figure skating coach in Australia. She graduated from Harbin Sports University. She and her husband Andrew Wang moved to Australia in 1996. She previously coached the Chinese national team. They are the parents of Tina Wang.

Her current and former students include Portia Rigby & Francis Rigby, Yang Fang & Gao Chongbo, Zhang Weina & Cao Xianming, Joel Watson, Tina Wang, and Kristie Kettleton & Trevor Sieders.
