= Portia Duval-Rigby =

Australian ice dancer

Personal information
- Born: 3 September 1970 (age 55)
- Height: 155 cm (5 ft 1 in)

Figure skating career
- Country: Australia
- Partner: Francis Rigby
- Skating club: Iceworld Skating Club
- Retired: 2001

Portia Duval-Rigby (born 3 September 1970 in Townsville, Queensland) is an Australian retired ice dancer. With her husband Francis Rigby, she is a two time Australian Champion. They were married in 1997. The Rigbys were coached by Helen Ma and Svetlana Liapina. Their highest placement at an ISU Championship was 12th at the 1999 and 2001 Four Continents Championships.

Rigby previously skated with Andrejs Liepinieks, with whom she competed at the 1989 World Junior Figure Skating Championships. She is a civil engineer.

== Competitive highlights ==
(with Rigby)

Event	1996–97	1997–98	1998–99	1999–00	2000–01
World Championships				32nd	32nd
Four Continents Championships			12th	13th	12th
Australian Championships	2nd		2nd	1st	1st
Golden Spin of Zagreb			9th	9th	
Karl Schäfer Memorial				9th	
Nebelhorn Trophy					12th
Ondrej Nepela Memorial				7th	
