= Andrew Torgashev =

American figure skater (born 2001)

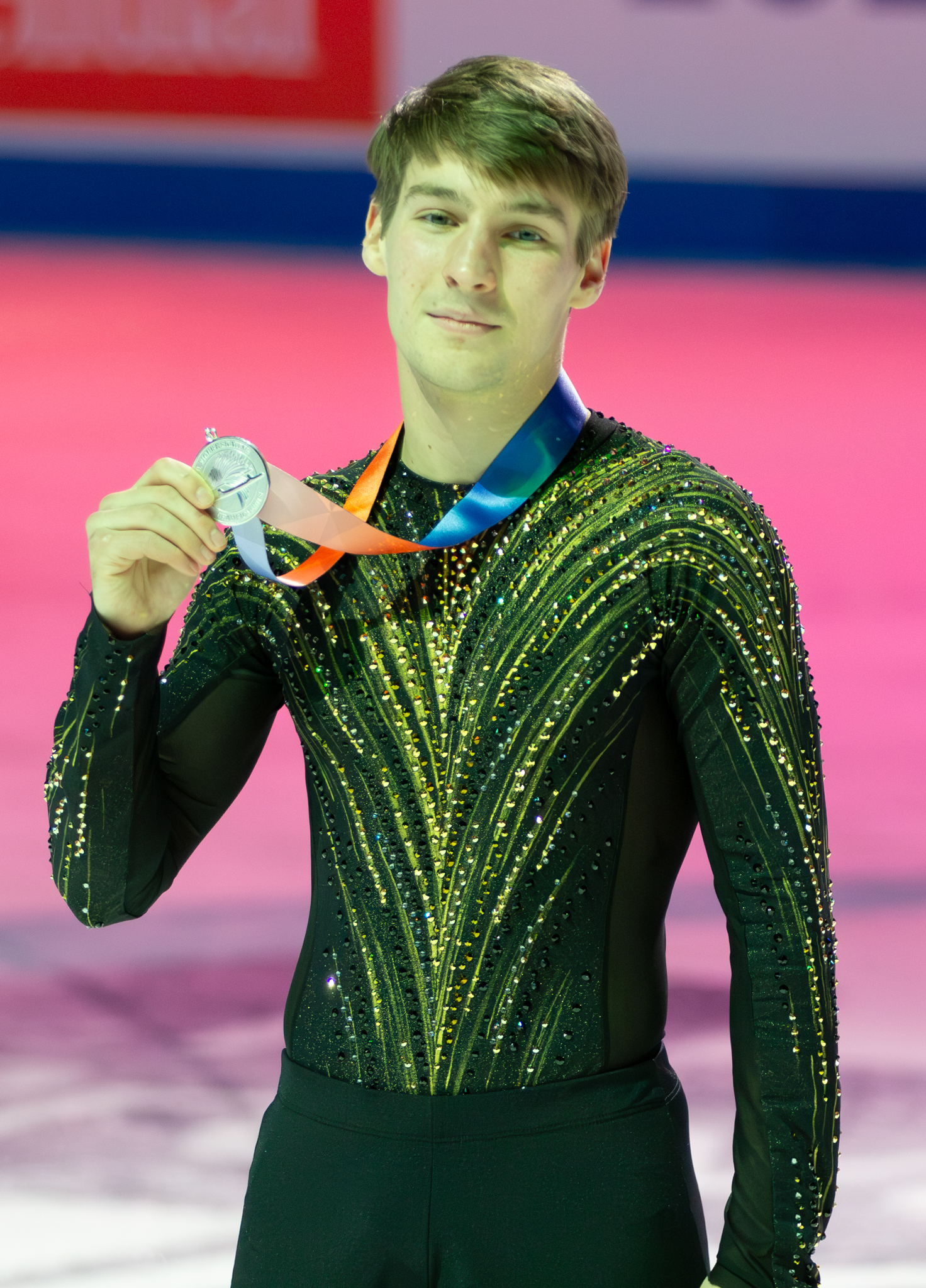
- Torgashev at the 2026 U.S. Championships

Personal information
- Born: May 29, 2001 (age 25) Coral Springs, Florida, U.S.
- Height: 5 ft 7 in (1.70 m)

Figure skating career
- Country: United States
- Discipline: Men's singles
- Coach: Rafael Arutyunyan; Brandon Frazier
- Skating club: Panthers Figure Skating Club
- Began skating: 2006
- Highest WS: 34th (2018–19)

Medal record
U.S. Championships
Silver medal – second place	2025 Wichita	Singles
Silver medal – second place	2026 St. Louis	Singles
Bronze medal – third place	2023 San Jose	Singles

Andrew Torgashev (born May 29, 2001) is an American figure skater. He is the 2024 Grand Prix de France bronze medalist, 2025 and 2026 U.S. national silver medalist, 2019 Asian Open Trophy silver medalist, the 2016 Tallinn Trophy bronze medalist, and the 2015 U.S. national junior champion.

He represented the United States at the 2026 Winter Olympics.

== Personal life ==
Andrew Torgashev was born May 29, 2001, in Coral Springs, Florida. He is the son of Ilona Melnichenko and Artem Torgashev, who competed for the Soviet Union in ice dance and pair skating respectively. As a result, Torgashev is fluent in both English and Russian. Later in his career as a competitive figure skater, Torgashev also began working as a coach at the Great Park Ice & FivePoint Arena in Irvine, California.

Torgashev, who is half-Ukrainian with family still living in the country, has vocalized his support for Ukraine following the Russian invasion and has partaken in ice shows to raise money in support.

== Career ==
=== Early career ===
Torgashev began learning to skate in 2006. He was awarded the juvenile bronze medal at the U.S. Junior Championships in December 2010. He won the U.S. national juvenile title in the 2011–2012 season and the U.S. intermediate title the following season.

He placed fourth in the novice men's category at the 2014 U.S. Championships.

=== 2014–15 season: U.S. Junior National champion ===
Torgashev became age-eligible for international junior events in the 2014–2015 season. Competing for in the ISU Junior Grand Prix series, he placed fourth in Ostrava, Czech Republic, and fifth in Tallinn, Estonia.

After taking the junior gold medal at the Eastern Sectionals, he won the junior title at the U.S. Championships, setting U.S. junior men's records in the free skate and total score. He was assigned to the 2015 World Junior Championships and finished tenth at the event, which was held in March in Tallinn.

=== 2015–16 season ===
Torgashev fractured his right ankle in June 2015 while practicing a quadruple toe loop. He underwent surgery in June to insert three screws, which were removed from his ankle in January 2016. As a result, he missed the entire skating season. He worked on his edges, stroking, and speed after returning to the ice.

=== 2016–17 season: Senior international debut ===
Torgashev returned to competition in July 2016. Competing in the 2016 Junior Grand Prix series, he won silver in Russia and placed fourth in Germany.

Making his senior international debut, he took the bronze medal at the 2016 CS Tallinn Trophy in November. He finished eleventh in the senior ranks in January at the 2017 U.S. Championships.

At the 2017 World Junior Championships, he placed twenty-fifth in the short program and did not qualify to the free skate.

=== 2017–18 season ===
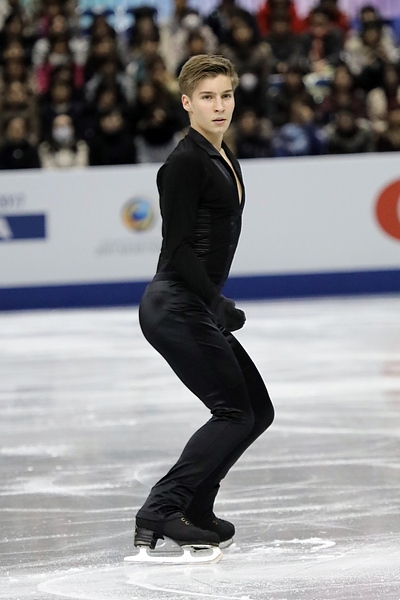
Torgashev at the 2017–18 Junior Grand Prix Final

Torgashev placed sixth at the Philadelphia Summer International in early August 2017. During the 2017 Junior Grand Prix series, he won silver in Belarus with a personal best total score of 212.71 points and then placed fourth in Italy. He qualified for the JGP Final in Nagoya, Japan, where he placed sixth. Torgashev also finished sixth at the 2017 CS Warsaw Cup. In January, at the 2018 U.S. Championships, he ranked ninth in the short program, fourteenth in the free skate, and thirteenth overall.

In June, he announced that he had relocated to Colorado Springs, Colorado, to work full-time with Christy Krall. Erik Schultz and Joshua Farris also became members of his coaching team.

=== 2018–19 season ===
In August 2018, Torgashev won the senior men's title at the 2018 Philadelphia Summer International. At the 2018 Junior Grand Prix in Bratislava, Slovakia, he placed fifth in the short program, third in the free skate, and fourth overall. In September, he won gold at JGP Lithuania in Kaunas after placing second in the short program and first in the free skate. These results qualified him for the 2018–19 Junior Grand Prix Final in Vancouver, Canada. Due to a fractured toe, he withdrew from the competition and was off the ice for eight weeks, until around mid-November. In January, he finished seventh in the senior ranks at the 2019 U.S. Championships.

In March 2019, he won silver at the Egna Spring Trophy.

=== 2019–20 season ===
Torgashev started the season at the 2019 Philadelphia Summer International, where he won the event. He competed in the JGP series, placing fourth in Riga, Latvia, at the JGP Croatia. He placed second in the short program with a new personal best, sixth in the free program, and fourth overall. He then competed at the senior level at the 2019 CS Asian Open Trophy, winning the silver medal.

Competing at the 2020 U.S. Championships, Torgashev placed third in the short program, skating a clean program that included a quadruple toe loop. He struggled in the free skate, falling twice and stepping out of an under-rotated attempted quadruple toe loop in the program's second half. Fifth in that segment, he dropped to fifth place overall.

Assigned to the 2020 World Junior Championships, Torgashev placed third in the short program, winning a small bronze medal. Torgashev fell four times in the long program, placing eleventh in that segment and dropping to eighth place overall.

=== 2020–21 and 2021–22 seasons: Injury struggles ===
In November 2019, Torgashev announced a coaching change as he moved from Colorado to California to train with Rafael Arutyunyan at Great Park Ice in Irvine.

He was unable to compete during the 2020–21 and 2021–22 figure skating seasons due to an injury in his right foot that ultimately required ankle surgery as well as a long rehabilitation.

=== 2022–23 season: U.S. National bronze medal and World Championship debut ===
Making his return to competition, Torgashev qualified for the 2023 US Championships in San Jose, following a second-place finish at the 2023 Eastern Sectional Championships. By his own account, he entered the event hoping to finish in the top ten. Torgashev couldn't afford to pay for his coaching team's travel expenses to attend the competition, so his father, Artem, stood in as his coach. He placed fifth in the short program, and then won the free skate, winning the overall bronze medal with a total score of 255.56 points. He called the result "surreal."

Because Torgashev had not competed internationally since 2020, he lacked the technical minimum scores required to attend ISU championships and could not obtain them in time to be assigned to the 2023 Four Continents Championships. He was provisionally selected for the 2023 World Championships in Saitama, Japan, pending his acquisition of the requisite scores at the International Challenge Cup.

Torgashev finished fifth at the Challenge Cup, securing the minimum technical scores, and finished twenty-first in his World Championship debut. He said afterward: "I would have liked better, but I'm so grateful to be here and for the opportunity."

=== 2023–24 season: Grand Prix and Four Continents debut ===
Torgashev began the season by winning the bronze medal at the 2023 CS Lombardia Trophy. He appeared on the Grand Prix at the 2023 Skate America, where he came eleventh in the short program but rose to seventh after the free skate.

In advance of the 2024 U.S. Championships, Torgashev was preemptively named to the American team for the 2024 Four Continents Championships in Shanghai, which were to take place the week after the national championships. He finished fifth at the national championships in Columbus. At the Four Continents Championships, Torgashev came eighth.

=== 2024–25 season: Grand Prix medal, U.S. national silver medal, and World Championships ===
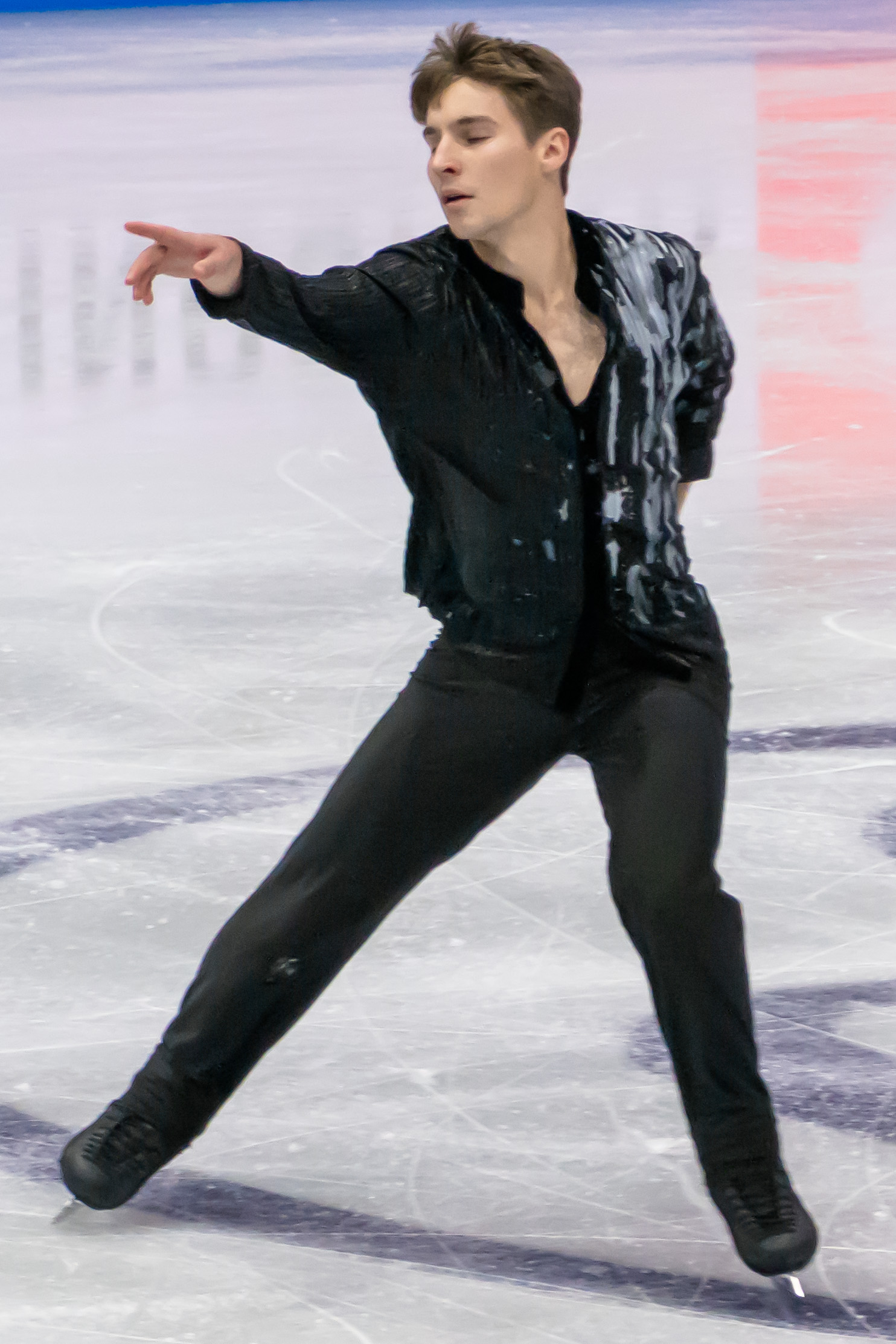
Torgashev during his short program at the 2025 World Championships

Torgashev started the season by competing on the 2024–25 ISU Challenger Series, finishing fifth at the 2024 CS Cranberry Cup International and ninth at the 2024 CS Nebelhorn Trophy. Going on to compete on the 2024–25 Grand Prix circuit, Torgashev would place fourth in both the short and program segments at the 2024 Grand Prix de France but managed to win the bronze medal as a result of many of the event's top contenders making mistakes. Initially only assigned one Grand Prix event, Torgashev's name was assigned to the 2024 NHK Trophy to replace Canadian skater, Stephen Gogolev, days before the event. At the NHK Trophy, Torgashev delivered a strong short program, earning a new season's best score, finishing fourth in that competition segment. He would place fifth in the free skate, where he obtained a new personal best free skate and combined total score, and finish fourth overall. Following his success on the Grand Prix series, Torgashev expressed elation, saying, "I packed for a few days trip to France, and ended up staying for a while more week in Japan. It was awesome. Even more, achieving a PB in the free and total score was so sick, just think I’m still capable of so much more though."

At the 2025 U.S. Championships, Torgashev won the silver medal behind Ilia Malinin after placing second in both the short program and free skate segments. “It is for sure validating whenever you're on the podium,” said Torgashev. “It makes it seem like your hard work is worth it. It definitely gives motivation to keep training and keep pushing on.”

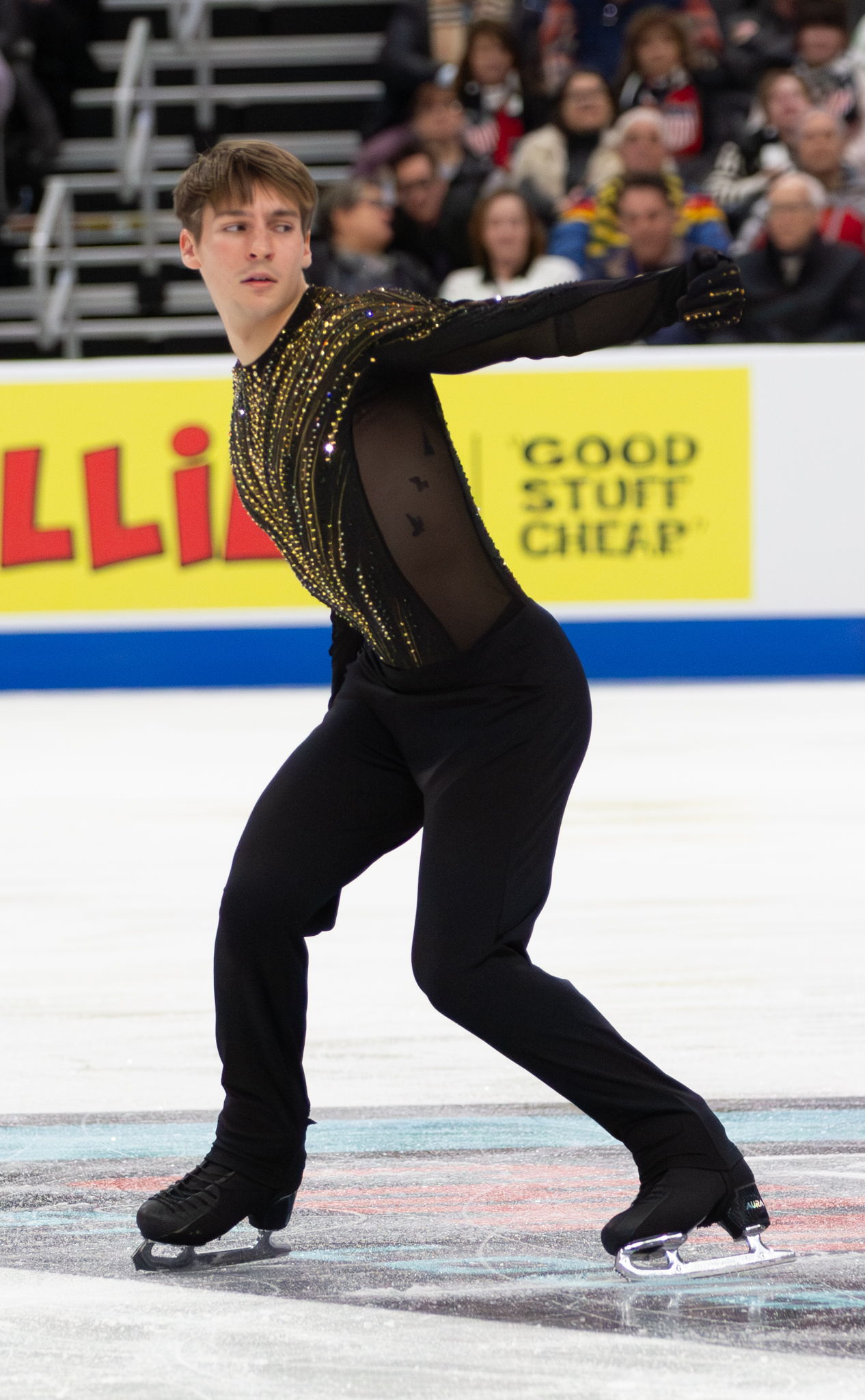
Torgashev during his free skate at the 2026 U.S. Championships

Two months later, at the 2025 World Championships, he skated a personal best in the short program, scoring 87.27 and placing eighth. However, he had an error-riddled free skate with two falls and numerous poor landings. He finished second to last in the free skate, and dropped down to twenty-second.

=== 2025–26 season: Milano Cortina Olympics ===
Torgashev opened the season by winning the silver medal at the 2025 CS Nebelhorn Trophy. During the 2025-26 Grand Prix season, he placed sixth at 2025 Grand Prix de France and nintat 2025 NHK Trophy.

In January, he won the silver medal at the 2026 U.S. Figure Skating Championships. "This is gonna be the best night of sleep that I'm gonna have in St Louis," he said after the free skate. "Every night I've been just shaking, going to bed just like, ready to get on with it." He was subsequently named to the 2026 Winter Olympic team.

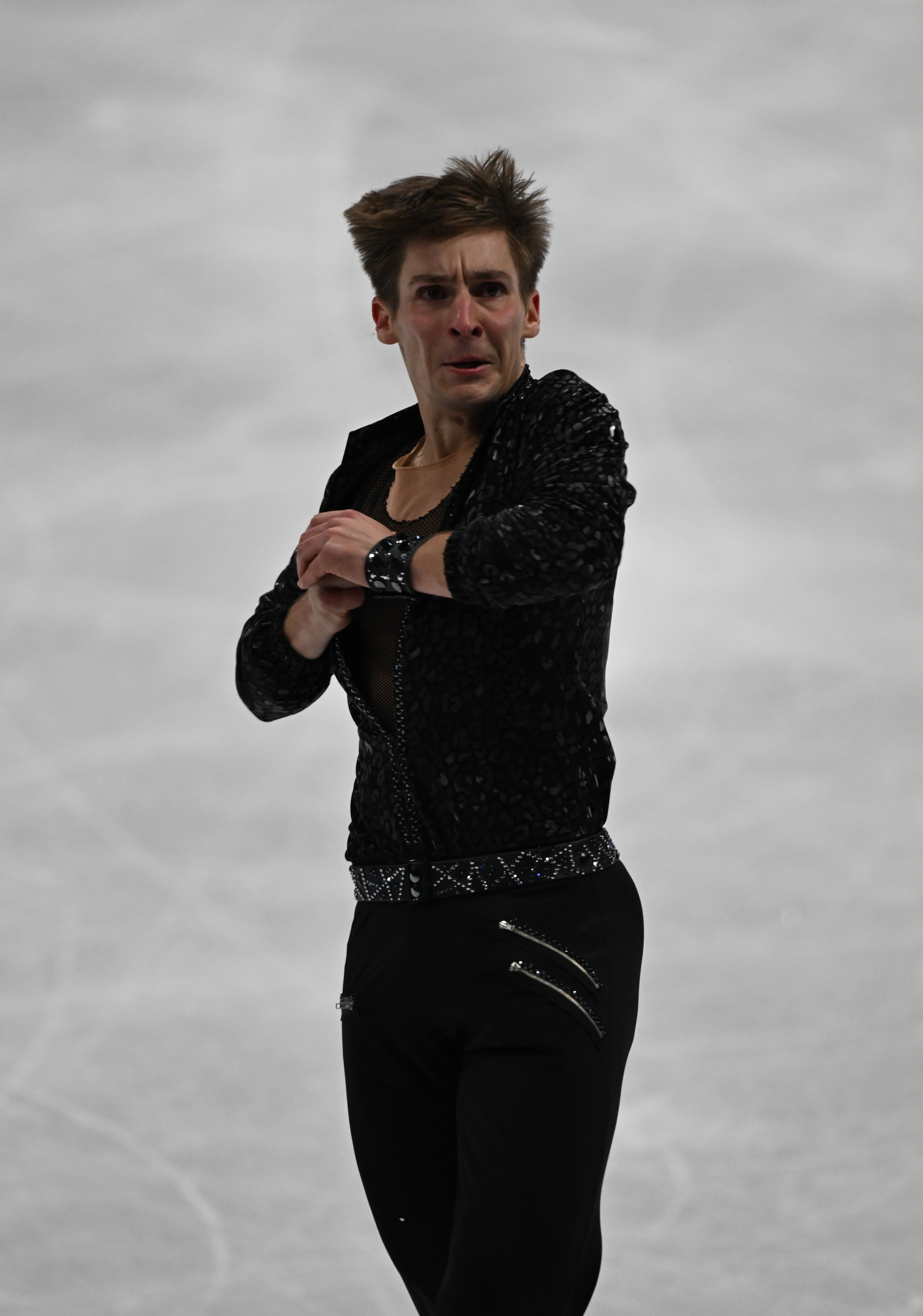
Torgashev at the 2026 Winter Olympics

On 10 February, Torgashev competed in the short program segment at the 2026 Winter Olympics, where he earned a personal best score and placed eighth. "I’m feeling great. The adrenaline has worn off a little bit, so I’m ready to sit down, but I’m still feeling very good," he said following his performance. "I chose to embrace the mood of the program—the rock and roll of it. At the end of the program, I always feel like I want to be a rock star on the big stage, like breaking the guitar. I was having the time of my life." Two days later, he delivered a personal best free skate, placing ninth in that segment and finishing twelfth overall. "It’s very humbling to put out two great performances and still be in the middle of the pack," he said after his free skate. "All of these guys are so great — everyone is so good. But I do feel good about myself. I feel honored to be competing with these guys."

In March, Torgashev completed his season at the 2026 World Championships. He placed seventh in the short program by setting a personal best score of 89.07 points. In the free skate, he placed eleventh with 160.34 points and finished tenth overall. "Last year in Boston, I felt enormous pressure to get spots for the Olympics, and it crushed me," he admitted after the skate. "Knowing now that I can be a good team player, just solid and reliable, without having to be spectacular, is a great feeling."

=== 2026–27 season ===
In late October, Torgashev announced via his Instagram that he would not compete on the Grand Prix series to allow him to recover from the Olympic season and reach his peak form as an athlete.

== Programs ==
Competition and exhibition programs by season
Season	Short program	Free skate program	Exhibition program
2014–15	"Parisienne Walkways": Composed by Gary Moore	Concierto de Aranjuez: Composed by Joaquín Rodrigo; Performed by Edvin Marton	—N/a
2015–16	"Le temps des cathédrales": From Notre-Dame de Paris; Composed by Bruno Pelletier	"Bohemian Rhapsody": Composed by Queen	—N/a
2016–17	"Le temps des cathédrales"	"Bohemian Rhapsody"	—N/a
2017–18	Moonlight Sonata: Composed by Ludwig van Beethoven	"El Tango de Roxanne": From Moulin Rouge!; Choreo. by Scott Brown	—N/a
2018–19	"Open Arms": Performed by Journey; Choreo. by Andrew Torgashev, Scott Brown, Evgeni Platov	"El Tango de Roxanne"	—N/a
2019–20	"Bloodstream": Performed by Tokio Myers; Choreo. by Andrew Torgashev, Scott Brown, Ilona Melnichenko, & Samuel Chouinard	"E lucevan le stelle": From Tosca; Composed by Giacomo Puccini; Choreo. by Andrew Torgashev, Scott Brown, Ilona Melnichenko, & Samuel Chouinard	—N/a
2022–23	Oblivion: Composed by Astor Piazzolla; Choreo. by Misha Ge	Medley: 1. "The Gate"; 2. "Push the Limits"; 3. "Gravity of Love"; Performed by Enigma; 4. "O Fortuna"; From Carmina Burana; Composed by Carl Orff; Choreo. by Misha Ge	—N/a
2023–24	"L'enfer": Performed by Stromae; Choreo. by Shae-Lynn Bourne	Void of Madness: 1. "The Void"; 2. "Madness"; Performed by Muse; Choreo. by Misha Ge	"Bloodstream"
2024–25	"L'enfer"	"Scheherazade": Composed by Nikolai Rimsky-Korsakov; Choreo. by Nadezda Kanaeva & Rafael Arutyunyan	"Enter the Jungle": Performed by Tokio Myers & Akala
2024–25	"L'enfer"	"Scheherazade": Composed by Nikolai Rimsky-Korsakov; Choreo. by Nadezda Kanaeva & Rafael Arutyunyan	"L'enfer"
2025–26	Maybe I Maybe You: Performed by Scorpions; Choreo. by Nadezda Kanaeva	Medley: 1. "ORATORES"; 2. "Good News"; Performed by Apashe; 3. This Place Was a Shelter; Performed by Ólafur Arnalds; Choreo. by Shae-Lynn Bourne	"Sweet Caroline": Performed by Neil Diamond
2025–26	Maybe I Maybe You: Performed by Scorpions; Choreo. by Nadezda Kanaeva	Medley: 1. "ORATORES"; 2. "Good News"; Performed by Apashe; 3. This Place Was a Shelter; Performed by Ólafur Arnalds; Choreo. by Shae-Lynn Bourne	"L'enfer"

== Competitive highlights ==
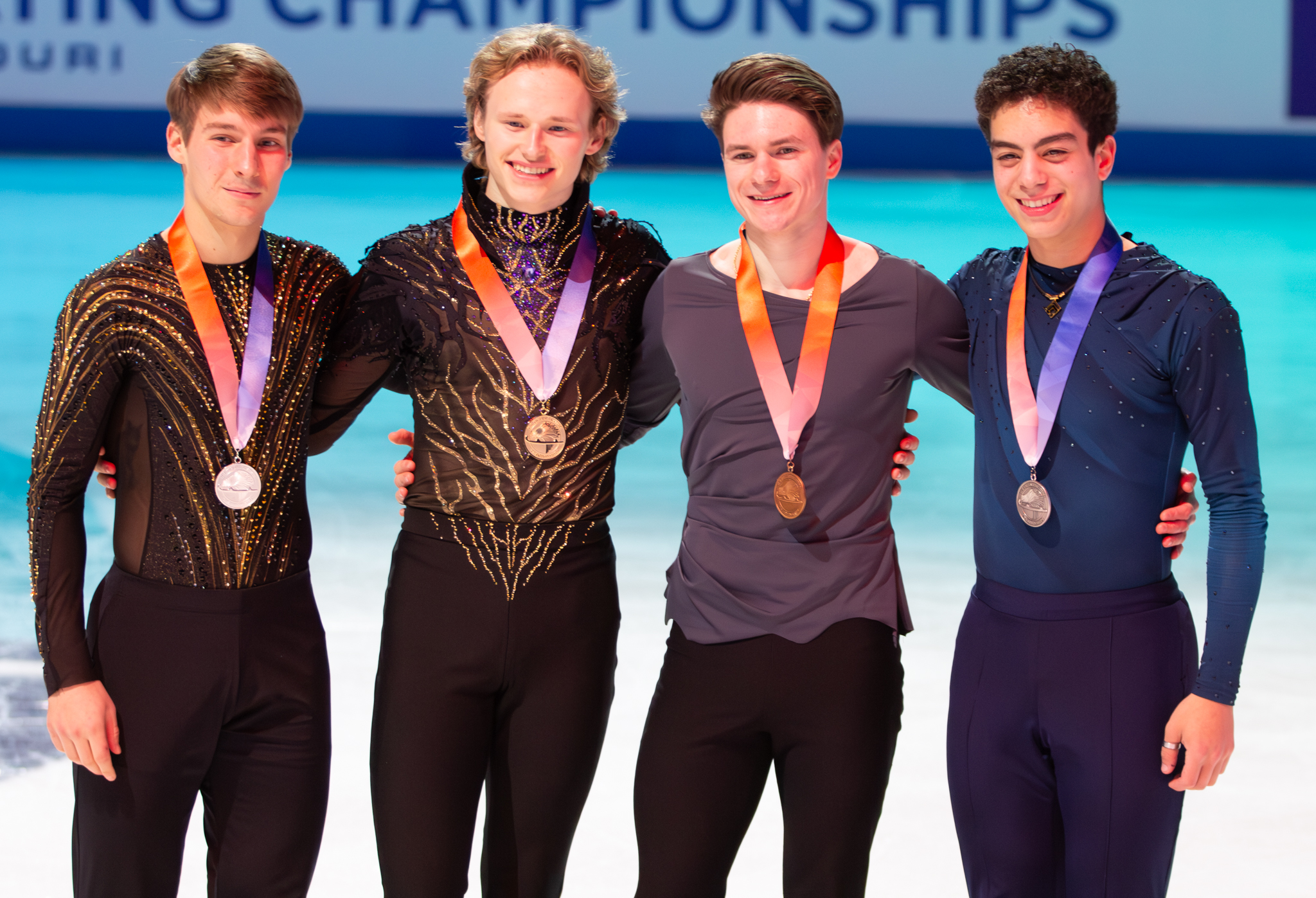
2026 U.S. Figure Skating Championships (from left to right): Andrew Torgashev, Ilia Malinin, Maxim Naumov, Jacob Sanchez

- GP – Event of the ISU Grand Prix Series
- JGP – Event of the ISU Junior Grand Prix Series
- CS – Event of the ISU Challenger Series
- TBD – Assigned
- WD – Withdrew from competition

Competition placements at senior level
Season	2016–17	2017–18	2018–19	2019–20	2022–23	2023–24	2024–25	2025–26	2026-27
Winter Olympics								12th	
World Championships					21st		22nd	10th	
Four Continents Championships						8th			
U.S. Championships	11th	13th	7th	5th	3rd	5th	2nd	2nd	
GP France							3rd	6th	
GP NHK Trophy							4th	9th	
GP Skate America						7th			
CS Asian Open Trophy				2nd					
CS Cranberry Cup							5th		
CS Lombardia Trophy						3rd			
CS Nebelhorn Trophy							9th	2nd	
CS Tallinn Trophy	3rd								
CS Warsaw Cup		6th							
Challenge Cup					5th				
Egna Spring Trophy			2nd						
Philadelphia Summer		6th	1st	1st					

Competition placements at junior level
Season	2014–15	2016–17	2017–18	2018–19	2019–20
World Junior Championships	10th	25th			8th
Junior Grand Prix Final			6th		
U.S. Championships	1st				
JGP Belarus			2nd		
JGP Croatia					4th
JGP Czech Republic	4th				
JGP Estonia	5th				
JGP Germany		4th			
JGP Italy			4th		
JGP Latvia					4th
JGP Lithuania				1st	
JGP Russia		2nd			
JGP Slovakia				4th	

== Detailed results ==
ISU personal best scores in the +5/-5 GOE System
Segment	Type	Score	Event
Total	TSS	259.06	2026 Winter Olympics
Short program	TSS	89.07	2026 World Championships
Short program	TES	48.56	2026 Winter Olympics
Short program	PCS	41.15	2025 World Championships
Free skating	TSS	170.12	2026 Winter Olympics
Free skating	TES	86.16	2026 Winter Olympics
Free skating	PCS	83.96	2026 Winter Olympics

=== Senior level ===
Results in the 2016–17 season
Date	Event	SP		FS		Total	
Date	Event	P	Score	P	Score	P	Score
Nov 20–27, 2016	(Estonia) 2016 CS Tallinn Trophy	4	68.12	4	133.33	3	201.45
Jan 14–22, 2017	(United States) 2017 U.S. Championships	7	77.82	11	147.53	11	225.35

Results in the 2017–18 season
Date	Event	SP		FS		Total	
Date	Event	P	Score	P	Score	P	Score
Aug 3–5, 2017	(United States) 2017 Philadelphia Summer International	10	61.49	3	141.46	6	202.95
Nov 16–19, 2017	(Poland) 2017 CS Warsaw Cup	6	61.52	6	121.26	6	182.78
Dec 29, 2017 – Jan 8, 2018	(United States) 2018 U.S. Championships	9	81.32	14	135.69	13	217.01

Results in the 2018–19 season
Date	Event	SP		FS		Total	
Date	Event	P	Score	P	Score	P	Score
Jul 30 – Aug 5, 2018	(United States) 2018 Philadelphia Summer International	3	67.67	1	138.74	1	206.41
Jan 19–27, 2019	(United States) 2019 U.S. Championships	9	76.95	6	149.02	7	225.97
Mar 28–31, 2019	(Italy) 2019 Egna Spring Trophy	4	66.97	1	151.46	2	218.43

Results in the 2019–20 season
Date	Event	SP		FS		Total	
Date	Event	P	Score	P	Score	P	Score
Jul 31 – Aug 3, 2019	(United States) 2019 Philadelphia Summer International	1	78.52	1	134.09	1	212.61
Oct 30 – Nov 3, 2019	(China) 2019 CS Asian Open Trophy	2	72.91	2	144.63	2	217.54
Jan 20–26, 2020	(United States) 2020 U.S. Championships	3	97.87	5	162.77	5	260.64

Results in the 2022–23 season
Date	Event	SP		FS		Total	
Date	Event	P	Score	P	Score	P	Score
Jan 23–29, 2023	(United States) 2023 U.S. Championships	5	78.78	1	177.78	3	255.56
Feb 23–26, 2023	(Netherlands) 2023 International Challenge Cup	10	70.33	4	145.53	5	215.86
Mar 22–26, 2023	(Japan) 2023 World Championships	22	71.41	21	139.18	21	210.59

Results in the 2023–24 season
Date	Event	SP		FS		Total	
Date	Event	P	Score	P	Score	P	Score
Sep 8–10, 2023	(Italy) 2023 CS Lombardia Trophy	2	86.41	4	146.85	3	233.26
Oct 20–22, 2023	(United States) 2023 Skate America	11	68.71	6	150.96	7	219.67
Jan 22–28, 2024	(United States) 2024 U.S. Championships	4	88.02	7	151.19	5	239.21
Jan 30 – Feb 4, 2024	(China) 2024 Four Continents Championships	8	81.15	8	156.05	8	237.20

Results in the 2024–25 season
Date	Event	SP		FS		Total	
Date	Event	P	Score	P	Score	P	Score
Aug 8–11, 2024	(United States) 2024 CS Cranberry Cup International	3	84.30	6	140.64	5	224.94
Sep 18–21, 2024	(Germany) 2024 Nebelhorn Trophy	14	63.92	6	143.73	9	207.65
Nov 1–3, 2024	2024 Grand Prix de France	4	81.54	4	152.10	3	233.64
Nov 8–10, 2024	(Japan) 2024 NHK Trophy	4	84.36	5	162.22	4	246.58
Jan 20–26, 2025	(United States) 2025 U.S. Championships	2	94.94	2	191.55	2	286.49
Mar 25–30, 2025	(United States) 2025 World Championships	8	87.27	23	125.52	22	212.79

Results in the 2025–26 season
Date	Event	SP		FS		Total	
Date	Event	P	Score	P	Score	P	Score
Sep 25–27, 2025	(Germany) 2025 CS Nebelhorn Trophy	2	87.35	4	152.19	2	239.54
Oct 17–19, 2025	2025 Grand Prix de France	12	71.52	5	161.84	6	233.36
Nov 7–9, 2025	(Japan) 2025 NHK Trophy	8	75.75	11	136.26	9	212.01
Jan 4–11, 2026	(United States) 2026 U.S. Championships	5	84.99	2	182.63	2	267.62
Feb 10–13, 2026	(Italy) 2026 Winter Olympics	8	88.94	9	170.12	12	259.06
Mar 24–29, 2026	(Czech Republic) 2026 World Championships	7	89.07	11	160.34	10	249.41

=== Junior level ===
Results in the 2014–15 season
Date	Event	SP		FS		Total	
Date	Event	P	Score	P	Score	P	Score
Sep 3–7, 2014	2014 JGP Czech Republic	4	57.94	2	124.63	4	182.57
Sep 24–27, 2014	2014 JGP Estonia	4	64.70	6	112.95	5	177.65
Jan 18–25, 2015	(United States) 2015 U.S. Championships (Junior)	1	75.61	1	149.63	1	225.24
Mar 2–8, 2015	(Estonia) 2015 World Junior Championships	10	67.78	6	133.96	10	201.74

Results in the 2016–17 season
Date	Event	SP		FS		Total	
Date	Event	P	Score	P	Score	P	Score
Sep 14–17, 2016	2016 JGP Russia	3	65.47	2	139.44	2	204.91
Oct 5–9, 2016	2016 JGP Germany	2	73.48	6	118.32	4	191.80
Mar 15–19, 2017	(Taiwan) 2017 World Junior Championships	25	55.42	–	–	25	55.42

Results in the 2017–18 season
Date	Event	SP		FS		Total	
Date	Event	P	Score	P	Score	P	Score
Sep 20–24, 2017	2017 JGP Belarus	3	74.34	2	138.37	2	212.71
Oct 11–14, 2017	2017 JGP Italy	4	69.03	2	136.53	4	205.56
Dec 7–10, 2017	(Japan) 2017–18 Junior Grand Prix Final	6	64.73	6	95.76	6	160.49

Results in the 2018–19 season
Date	Event	SP		FS		Total	
Date	Event	P	Score	P	Score	P	Score
Aug 22–25, 2018	2018 JGP Slovakia	5	65.37	3	129.38	4	194.75
Sep 5–8, 2018	2018 JGP Lithuania	2	69.39	1	132.24	1	201.63

Results in the 2019–20 season
Date	Event	SP		FS		Total	
Date	Event	P	Score	P	Score	P	Score
Sep 4–7, 2019	2019 JGP Latvia	6	78.52	4	131.16	4	196.23
Sep 25–28, 2019	2019 JGP Croatia	2	80.53	6	132.33	4	212.86
Mar 2–8, 2020	(Estonia) 2020 World Junior Championships	3	81.50	11	127.45	8	208.95
