= Andrew Wang (coach) =

Personal information
- Full name: Andrew Wang
- Other names: Chang Yuan Wang
- Born: China

Andrew Wang (birth name Wang Chang Yuan) is a Chinese figure skating coach in Australia. He graduated from Harbin Sports University. He and his wife Helen Ma moved to Australia in 1996. He previously coached the Chinese national team. They are the parents of Tina Wang.

His current and former students include Anthony Liu, Joel Watson, Tina Wang, Phoebe Di Tommaso, and Caroline Luczynski.
