= Gabriella Izzo =

American-Austrian pair skater (born 2001)

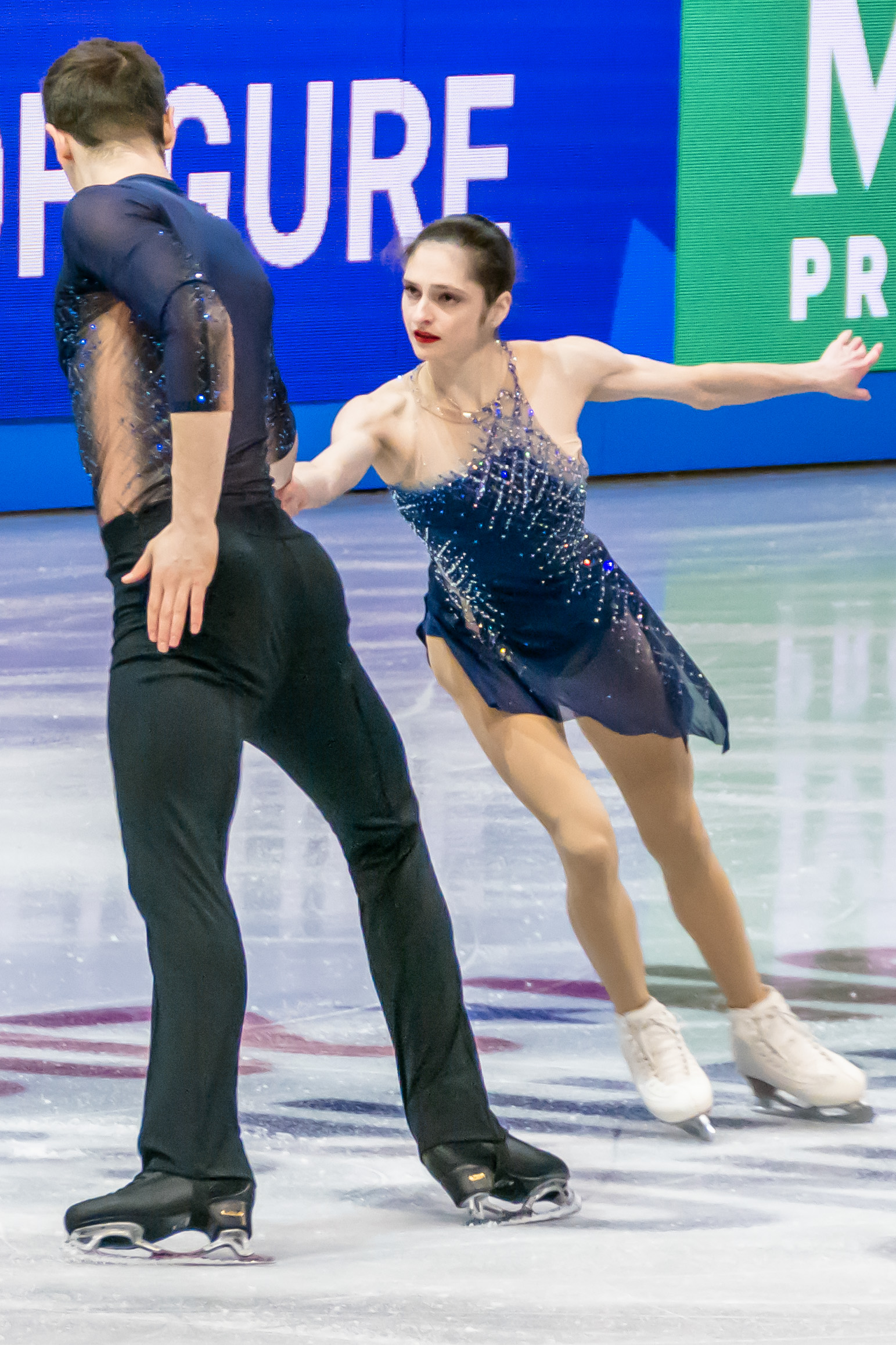
- Izzo and Maierhofer at the 2025 World Championships

Personal information
- Born: August 5, 2001 (age 25) San Francisco, California, U.S.
- Home town: Brighton, Massachusetts, U.S. and Salzburg, Austria
- Height: 5 ft 3 in (1.59 m)

Figure skating career
- Country: Austria (since 2024); United States (2018–23)
- Discipline: Pair skating (since 2024); Women's singles (2018–23)
- Partner: Luc Maierhofer (since 2024)
- Coach: Severin Kiefer; Aleksey Letov; Olga Ganicheva
- Skating club: Skating Club of Boston
- Began skating: 2011

Medal record
Austrian Championships
Gold medal – first place	2026 Innsbruck	Pairs
Silver medal – second place	2025 Dornbirn	Pairs

Gabriella Izzo (born August 5, 2001) is an American-born pair skater who currently competes with Luc Maierhofer for Austria. Together, they are the 2026 Austrian national champions and the 2024 Ice Challenge champions.

As a singles skater, she is the 2019 CS Asian Open Trophy bronze medalist, 2021 U.S. International Figure Skating Classic bronze medalist, and the 2022 U.S. national pewter medalist. At the junior level, she is the 2019 U.S. junior national champion.

== Personal life ==
Izzo was born August 5, 2001, in Greenbrae, California. She graduated from Boston Latin School in 2019 before going on to attend Harvard University, graduating in 2025.

== Career ==
=== Singles skating career ===
==== Early years ====
Izzo began learning to skate when she was eight or nine years old. Her first figure skating coach was Suna Murray.

At the 2018 U.S. Junior Championships, Izzo would finish sixth. That same year, she made her international junior debut at the 2018 International Challenge Cup, where she finished fourth.

==== 2018–19 season: U.S. junior national title ====
Prior to the season, Izzo switched coaches and began training at the Mitchell Johansson Method Training Center in Revere, Massachusetts under coaches, Mark Mitchell and Peter Johansson.

She made her ISU Junior Grand Prix (JGP) debut in autumn 2018, placing sixth at 2018 JGP Canada and ninth at 2018 JGP Slovenia. In January, she won the junior ladies title at the 2019 U.S. Championships.

In March, Izzo made her senior international debut at the 2019 Egna Spring Trophy, where she won the gold medal.

==== 2019–20 season ====
Beginning her season on the 2019–20 ISU Junior Grand Prix circuit, Izzo placed eighth in 2019 JGP Croatia and ninth in 2019 JGP Latvia. In November, she won bronze at a senior international, the 2019 CS Asian Open Figure Skating Trophy in China.

In January, making her senior national debut, she finished ninth at the 2020 U.S. Championships in Greensboro, North Carolina. Following the event, she underwent surgery for a torn labrum in her left shoulder. Due to the operation and pandemic-related rink closures, she was off the ice from around mid-January to June.

==== 2020–21 season ====
Izzo was invited to her first senior Grand Prix competition, 2020 Skate America, but withdrew before the event. She placed ninth at the 2021 U.S. Championships. Following the season, Izzo relocated to Norwood, Massachusetts, where she began training at the Skating Club of Boston under coaches, Aleksey Letov and Olga Ganicheva.

==== 2021–22 season: U.S. national pewter medalist ====
Izzo began the season in September, winning bronze at the 2021 U.S. International Classic. Given two Challenger assignments, Izzo finished thirteenth at the 2021 CS Warsaw Cup and fourth at the 2021 CS Golden Spin of Zagreb.

At the 2022 U.S. Championships, Izzo was seventh after the short program, but a fourth-place free skate elevated her to the pewter medal position overall. This placement earned her an assignment to the 2022 Four Continents Championships in Tallinn, where she came in eighth-place.

==== 2022–23 season ====
Withdrawing from the 2022 CS U.S. Classic, Izzo made her season debut at the 2022 CS Budapest Trophy, where she finished in eighth place. She was then invited to make her senior Grand Prix debut at the 2022 MK John Wilson Trophy, where she came seventh.

She ended her season with an eleventh-place finish at the 2023 U.S. Championships.

In March 2023, Izzo announced her retirement from singles skating and planned to pursue pair skating.

=== Pair skating career ===
==== 2023–24 season: Brief partnership with Ferland for Canada and retirement ====
In August 2023, it was announced that Izzo had teamed up with Canadian pair skater, Thierry Ferland, and that they would represent Canada. However, this partnership would end up being short-lived. In November, Izzo would announce her retirement from competitive figure skating.

==== 2024–25 season: Return to competition and debut with Maierhofer for Austria ====
In July 2024, it was announced that Izzo had decided to come out of retirement and had teamed up with Austrian skater Luc Maierhofer, to compete for Austria. It was subsequently announced that the pair would be coached by Severin Kiefer in Salzburg while also making trips to Norwood, Massachusetts to work with Izzo's singles coaches, Aleksey Letov and Olga Ganicheva.

The pair would make their international debut in November, winning the gold medal at the 2024 Ice Challenge. At the event, the pair would also score the required minimum technical element score points to compete at the European and World Championships. They went on to compete on the 2024–25 ISU Challenger Series, finishing tenth at the 2024 CS Warsaw Cup and ninth at the 2024 CS Golden Spin of Zagreb.

In mid-December, Izzo/Maierhofer won the silver medal at the 2025 Austrian Championships behind Schaller/Mayr. They were subsequently named to the 2025 European Figure Skating Championships team, but they later had to withdraw due to illness.

The pair ended the season by making their World Championship debut, where they finished in twenty-third place.

==== 2025–26 season: Austrian national title ====
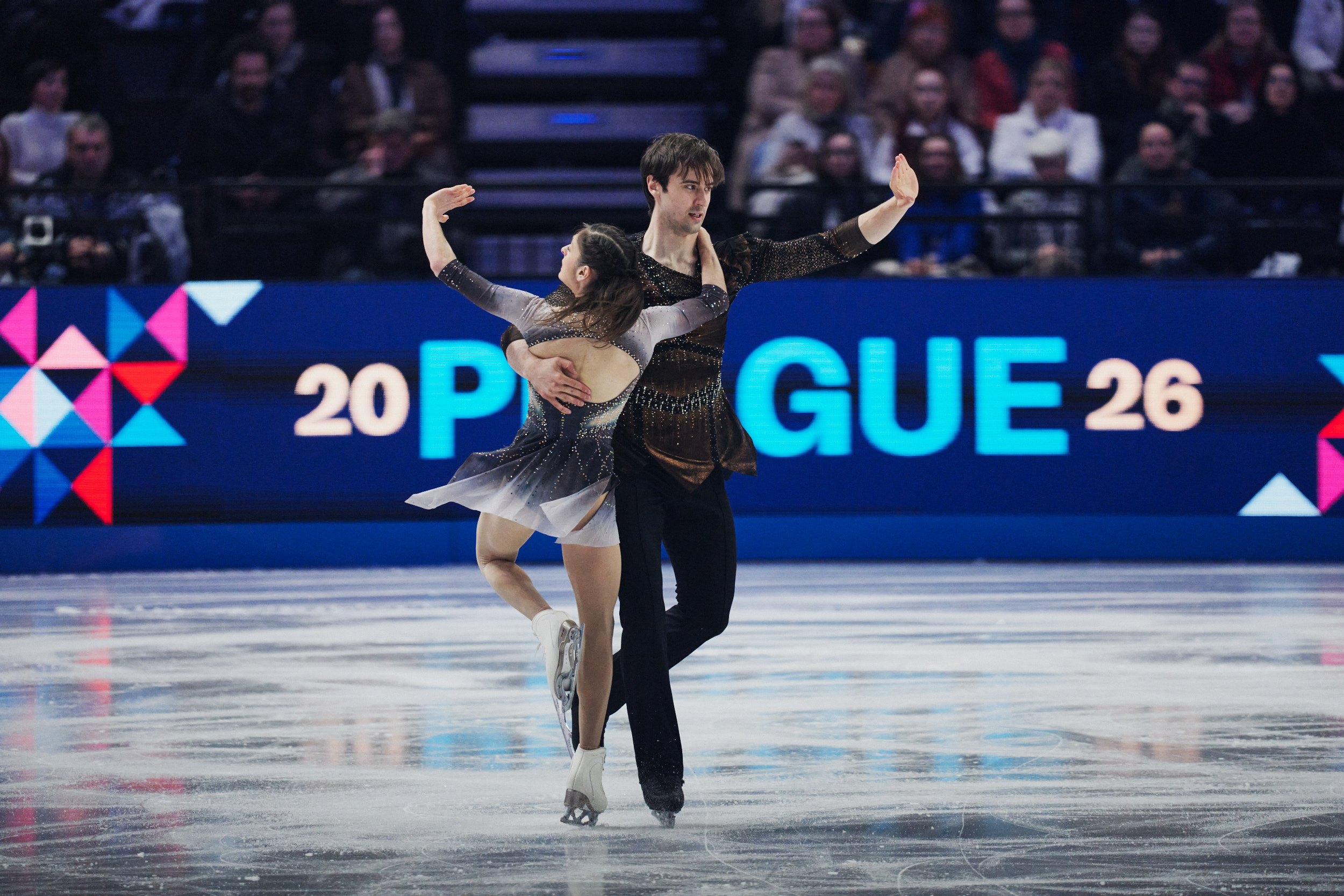
Izzo and Maierhofer at the 2026 World Championships

Izzo/Maierhofer opened their season by competing on the 2025–26 Challenger Series, placing eighth at the 2025 CS John Nicks International Pairs Competition and tenth at the 2025 CS Nebelhorn Trophy. They followed this up by finishing fourth at the 2025 Swiss Open, fourth at the 2025 Ice Challenge, and winning silver at the 2025 Cup of Innsbruck.

In December, they won their first national title at the 2026 Austrian Championships. The following month, they competed at the 2026 European Championships in Sheffield, England, United Kingdom, finishing in twelfth place. In March, they finished 14th at the 2026 World Championships.

== Programs ==
=== Pair skating with Luc Maierhofer (for Austria) ===
Season	Short program	Free skating
2025–26	Padam, padam...; Milord by Édith Piaf performed by Legendis Orchestra choreo. by Mark Pillay	Troy; Hector's Death; Achilles Leads the Myrmadons by James Horner, Simon Rhodes, & David Foster; Remember performed by Josh Groban choreo. by Renée Roca
2024–25	Maybe I Maybe You by Scorpions choreo. by Renée Roca, Drew Meekins	Phantasia by Andrew Lloyd Webber, Julian Lloyd Webber, & Sarah Chang; The Music of the Night (from The Phantom of the Opera) by Andrew Lloyd Webber performed by Michael Crawford choreo. by Renée Roca, Drew Meekins

=== Single skating (for the United States) ===
Season	Short program	Free skating
2022–23	Punga by Cédric Tour choreo. by Benoît Richaud	Elena & Lila; Orlando: Memory is the Seamstress by Max Richter; November by Mari Samuelsen & Max Richter arranged by Cédric Tour choreo. by Benoît Richaud
2021–22	Sous le ciel de Paris; La Foule by Édith Piaf choreo. by Adam Blake	With One Look (from Sunset Boulevard) by Andrew Lloyd Webber performed by Glenn Close choreo. by Adam Blake
2020–21	I'm Here (from The Color Purple) performed by Cynthia Erivo choreo. by Jamie Isley	With One Look (from Sunset Boulevard) by Andrew Lloyd Webber performed by Glenn Close choreo. by Adam Blake
2019–20	I'm Here (from The Color Purple) performed by Cynthia Erivo choreo. by Jamie Isley	Starry, Starry Night (from Loving Vincent) performed by Lianne La Havas choreo. by Jamie Isley
2018–19	Summertime by George Gershwin performed by Ella Fitzgerald choreo. by Jamie Isley	La Vie en rose; T'es beau, tu sais; Non, je ne regrette rien performed by Patricia Kaas choreo. by Jamie Isley
2017–18	Tu Pálida Voz by Lidia Borda	Dracula Soundtrack

== Competitive highlights ==
- GP – Event of the ISU Grand Prix Series
- JGP – Event of the ISU Junior Grand Prix Series
- CS – Event of the ISU Challenger Series
- TBD – Assigned
- WD – Withdrew from competition

=== Pair skating with Luc Maierhofer (for Austria) ===
Competition placements at senior level
Season	2024–25	2025–26
World Championships	23rd	14th
European Championships		12th
Austrian Championships	2nd	1st
CS Golden Spin of Zagreb	9th	
CS John Nicks Pairs		8th
CS Nebelhorn Trophy		10th
CS Warsaw Cup	10th	
Challenge Cup	6th	
Cup of Innsbruck		2nd
Ice Challenge	1st	4th
Merano Ice Trophy	3rd	

=== Single skating (for the United States) ===
Competition placements at senior level
Season	2018–19	2019–20	2020–21	2021–22	2022–23
Four Continents Championships				8th	
U.S. Championships		9th	8th	4th	11th
GP Wilson Trophy					7th
CS Asian Open Trophy		3rd			
CS Budapest Trophy					8th
CS Golden Spin of Zagreb				4th	
CS Warsaw Cup				13th	
Cranberry Cup				WD	
Egna Spring Trophy	1st				
U.S. Classic				3rd	

Competition placements at junior level
Season	2017–18	2018–19	2019–20
U.S. Championships	6th	1st	
JGP Canada		6th	
JGP Croatia			8th
JGP Latvia			9th
JGP Slovenia		9th	
Asian Open Trophy		2nd	
Challenge Cup	4th		

== Detailed results ==
ISU personal best scores in the +5/-5 GOE System
Segment	Type	Score	Event
Total	TSS	171.24	2025 CS Nebelhorn Trophy
Short program	TSS	62.13	2025 CS Nebelhorn Trophy
Short program	TES	35.32	2025 CS John Nicks Pairs Challenge
Short program	PCS	27.20	2025 CS Nebelhorn Trophy
Free skating	TSS	112.39	2026 World Championships
Free skating	TES	60.39	2026 World Championships
Free skating	PCS	54.20	2025 CS Nebelhorn Trophy

=== Pair skating with Luc Maierhofer (for Austria) ===
Results in the 2024–25 season
Date	Event	SP		FS		Total	
Date	Event	P	Score	P	Score	P	Score
Nov 5–10, 2024	(Austria) 2024 Ice Challenge	3	51.69	1	112.13	1	163.82
Nov 20–24, 2024	(Poland) 2024 CS Warsaw Cup	15	38.87	8	95.13	10	134.00
Dec 4–7, 2024	(Croatia) 2024 CS Golden Spin of Zagreb	9	51.68	9	98.92	9	150.60
Dec 11–15, 2024	(Austria) 2025 Austrian Championships	2	47.46	1	111.57	2	159.03
Feb 13–16, 2025	(Italy) 2025 Merano Ice Trophy	3	54.46	4	103.06	3	157.52
Feb 13–16, 2025	(Netherlands) 2025 Challenge Cup	6	37.22	6	76.02	6	113.24
Mar 25–30, 2025	(United States) 2025 World Championships	23	48.20	—N/a	—N/a	23	48.20

Results in the 2025–26 season
Date	Event	SP		FS		Total	
Date	Event	P	Score	P	Score	P	Score
Sep 2–3, 2025	(United States) 2025 CS John Nicks International Pairs Competition	8	59.59	8	105.41	8	165.00
Sep 25–27, 2025	(Germany) 2025 CS Nebelhorn Trophy	9	62.13	10	109.11	10	171.24
Nov 5–9, 2025	(Austria) 2025 Ice Challenge	4	59.03	4	102.98	4	162.01
Nov 13–16, 2025	(Austria) 2025 Cup of Innsbruck	2	62.15	4	94.10	2	156.25
Dec 10–13, 2025	(Austria) 2026 Austrian Championships	1	60.71	1	111.97	1	172.68
Jan 13–18, 2026	(United Kingdom) 2026 European Championships	11	54.65	12	103.43	12	158.08
Mar 24–29, 2026	(Czech Republic) 2026 World Championships	19	58.22	14	112.39	14	170.61

=== Single skating (for the United States) ===
- At national events in the United States, pewter medals are awarded for fourth place.

==== Senior level ====
2022–2023 season
Date	Event	SP	FS	Total
January 23–29, 2023	2023 U.S. Championships	15; 45.73	6; 120.67	11; 166.40
November 11–13, 2022	2022 MK John Wilson Trophy	5; 62.92	7; 111.18	7; 174.10
October 13–16, 2022	2022 CS Budapest Trophy	10; 52.01	7; 101.22	8; 153.23
2021–2022 season
Date	Event	SP	FS	Total
January 18–23, 2022	2022 Four Continents Championships	8; 63.19	7; 116.87	8; 180.06
January 3–9, 2022	2022 U.S. Championships	7; 67.51	4; 120.60	4; 188.11
November 17–20, 2021	2021 CS Warsaw Cup	11; 55.56	14; 100.22	13; 155.78
September 15–19, 2021	2021 U.S. Classic	3; 63.93	3; 118.83	3; 182.76
2020–2021 season
Date	Event	SP	FS	Total
January 11–21, 2021	2021 U.S. Championships	7; 62.32	9; 109.44	8; 171.76
2019–2020 season
Date	Event	SP	FS	Total
January 20–26, 2020	2020 U.S. Championships	6; 65.94	11; 108.47	9; 174.41
November 2–3, 2019	2019 CS Asian Open Trophy	2; 65.30	3; 104.45	3; 169.75

==== Junior level ====
2019–2020 season
Date	Event	SP	FS	Total
September 25–28, 2019	2019 JGP Croatia	9; 51.61	8; 98.10	8; 149.71
September 4–7, 2019	2019 JGP Latvia	5; 59.39	9; 101.55	9; 160.94
