= Pavel Drozd =

Russian ice dancer

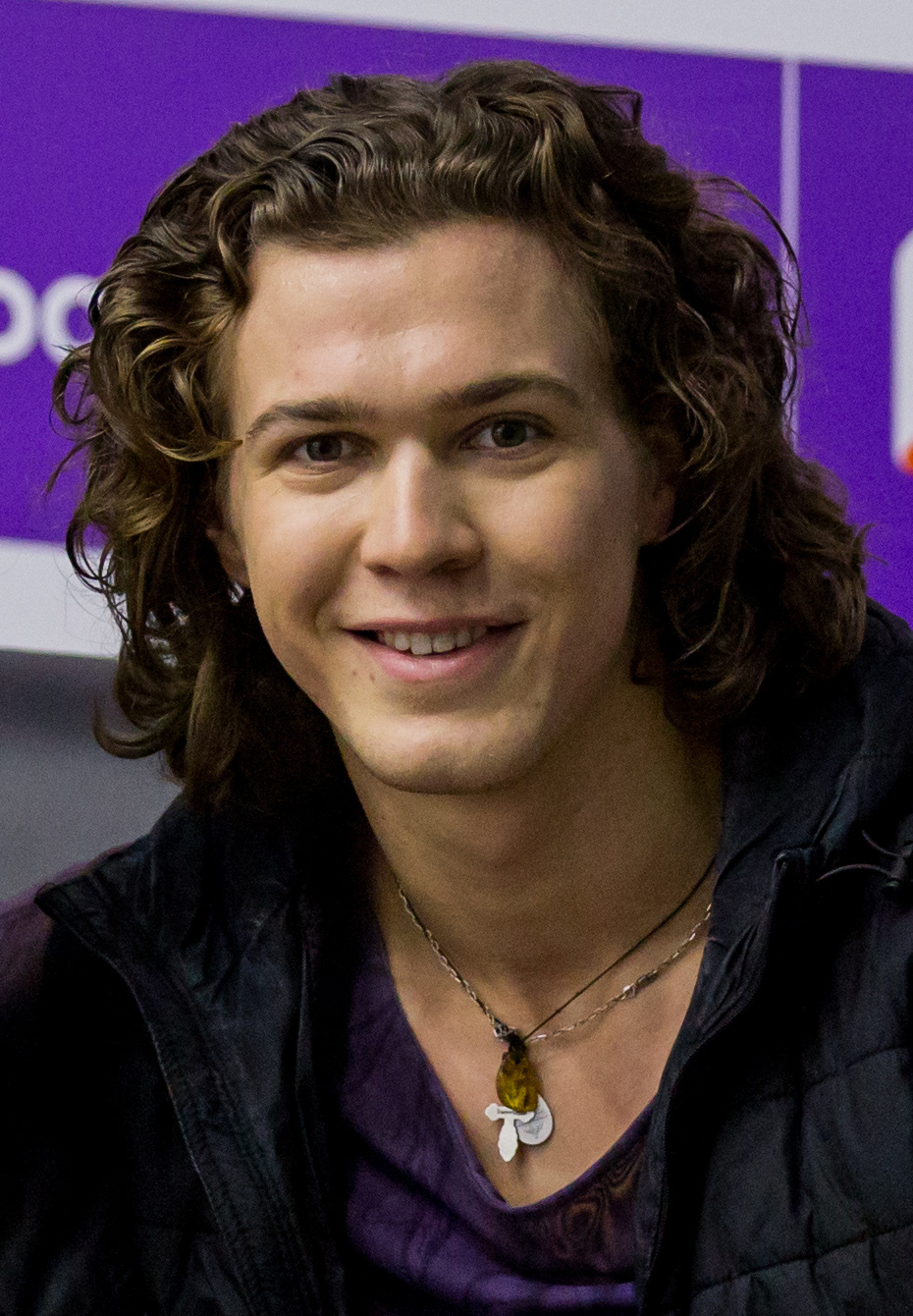
- Drozd in 2019

Personal information
- Native name: Павел Игоревич Дрозд
- Full name: Pavel Igorevich Drozd
- Born: 14 December 1995 (age 30) Saint Petersburg, Russia
- Height: 1.87 m (6 ft 1 1/2 in)

Figure skating career
- Country: (Individual Neutral Athletes) Individual Neutral Athlete; Russia
- Partner: Elizaveta Shichina
- Coach: Alexander Zhulin
- Skating club: Sambo-70
Medal record
Representing Russia (with Loboda)
Figure skating: Ice dancing
World Junior Championships
Silver medal – second place	2017 Taipei	Ice dancing
Bronze medal – third place	2016 Debrecen	Ice dancing
Junior Grand Prix Final
Silver medal – second place	2016–17 Marseille	Ice dancing
Silver medal – second place	2015–16 Barcelona	Ice dancing
Silver medal – second place	2014–15 Barcelona	Ice dancing

Pavel Igorevich Drozd (Russian: Павел Игоревич Дрозд; born 14 December 1995) is a Russian ice dancer who currently competes with Elizaveta Shichina as an Individual Neutral Athlete. With his former skating partner, Alla Loboda, he is a two-time World Junior medalist (silver in 2017, bronze in 2016), a three-time JGP Final silver medalist (2014–15, 2015–16, 2016–17), and the 2016 Russian junior national champion. With his former skating partner, Ksenia Konkina, he is the 2019 CS Asian Open Trophy and 2019 CS Warsaw Cup silver medalist.

== Personal life ==
Pavel Igorevich Drozd was born on 14 December 1995 in Saint Petersburg, Russia. He moved to Moscow in 2010. His younger sister, Daria, has also competed in ice dancing. He studies foreign languages, first English and Spanish, and has now also taken up Italian and French.

== Career ==
=== Early years ===
Drozd began learning to skate at age five in Saint Petersburg. He had an ice dancing partnership with Anastasia Safronova from 2008 to 2010. After they parted ways, Ksenia Rumiantseva invited him to join her group in Moscow. He then competed with Valeria Podlazova for two seasons.

=== Start of partnership with Loboda ===
On 10 March 2012, Drozd began skating with Alla Loboda, who trained under the same coaches. Led by Ksenia Rumiantseva and Ekaterina Volobueva in Moscow, they placed 11th at the 2013 Russian Junior Championships.

=== 2013–2014 season ===
Loboda/Drozd debuted on the ISU Junior Grand Prix (JGP) series in the 2013–14 season, obtaining bronze medals in Riga, Latvia and Gdańsk, Poland. They finished fifth at the 2014 Russian Junior Championships.

=== 2014–2015 season ===
Loboda/Drozd's first assignment of the 2014–15 JGP season was in Courchevel, France. Ranked second in the short dance and first in the free dance, they won the gold medal by a margin of 2.82 points over Canada's Madeline Edwards / Zhao Kai Pang. They took silver in Aichi, Japan, finishing second to Edwards/Pang by 0.44 points. Loboda/Drozd qualified for the JGP Final in Barcelona, where they won the silver medal behind teammates Anna Yanovskaya / Sergey Mozgov. Having finished 4th at the 2015 Russian Junior Championships, they were not named in Russia's team to the 2015 World Junior Championships.

=== 2015–2016 season ===
In the 2015–16 JGP season, Loboda/Drozd won the silver medal in Bratislava, Slovakia, and then gold in Linz, Austria, before taking silver behind Americans Lorraine McNamara / Quinn Carpenter at the 2015–16 JGP Final in Barcelona. After winning their first junior national title, they were awarded the bronze medal at the 2016 World Junior Championships in Debrecen, Hungary, having finished third behind McNamara/Carpenter and Rachel Parsons / Michael Parsons.

=== 2016–2017 season ===
Competing in the 2016–17 JGP season, Loboda/Drozd won gold medals in Saransk, Russia, and Tallinn, Estonia. In December 2016, they were awarded the silver medal behind the Parsons at the 2016–17 JGP Final in Marseille, France.

In March 2017 they won the silver medal at the 2017 World Junior Championships.

=== 2017–2018 season ===
Loboda/Drozd started their senior career by winning the silver medal at the 2017 CS Lombardia Trophy. In October 2017, they made their Grand Prix debut at the 2017 Skate Canada, where they placed 5th. Next month they competed at their 2nd GP event of the season, the 2017 Internationaux de France, where they placed 9th. In December 2017, they competed at the 2018 Russian Championships, where they placed 6th after placing 6th in both the short dance and the free dance.

Anjelika Krylova and Oleg Volkov became their new coaches in May 2018. Loboda and Drozd ended their partnership by July.

=== 2018–2019 season ===
In July 2018, Alexander Zhulin began coaching the partnership of Drozd and Angélique Abachkina, but the skaters parted ways after learning that the French federation would not release her to compete for Russia. On 5 November 2018, Drozd confirmed that he had teamed up with Ksenia Konkina and would continue to be coached by Zhulin. Konkina/Drozd made their international debut at the 2019 Open Ice Mall Cup where they won the bronze medal.

=== 2019–2020 season ===
Konkina/Drozd opened their season by winning the gold medal at 2019 NRW Trophy in Dortmund, Germany. They then won silver at the 2019 CS Asian Open Trophy behind Christina Carreira / Anthony Ponomarenko of the United States.

=== 2020–2021 season ===
Konkina/Drozd were scheduled to make their Grand Prix debut at the 2020 Rostelecom Cup but withdrew. The team split later in the season after health issues forced Konkina to retire. Drozd re-teamed with Angélique Abachkina after she successfully obtained her release from the Fédération Française des Sports de Glace.

=== 2026–2027 season ===
On 30 June 2026, the International Skating Union announced that figure skaters from Russia and Belarus would be allowed to compete at international competitions as Individual Neutral Athletes (AINs). Each of these skaters are be required to undergo an individual assessment conducted by the ISU Council to determine whether they meet the criteria for neutral status. The team's application was approved, making them eligible to compete internationally as neutral athletes.

== Programs ==
=== With Shanaeva ===
Season	Rhythm dance	Free dance	Exhibition
2022–2023	Havana 1957 by Orishas		

=== with Abachkina ===
Season	Short dance	Free dance	Exhibition
2021–2022	Puddit (Put It Where You Want It); Roof Garden by Al Jarreau		

=== With Konkina ===
Season	Rhythm dance	Free dance
2020–2021	Mack the Knife performed by Michael Bublé; Mack and Mabel by Jerry Herman choreo. by Sergei Petukhov	My Brilliant Friend by Max Richter choreo. by Sergei Petukhov

=== With Loboda ===
Season	Short dance	Free dance	Exhibition
2017–2018	Samba: Largadinho by Claudia Leitte; Rhumba: Diles by Malú; Samba	Chicago (musical soundtrack)	Sous le ciel de Paris by Zaz, Pablo Alborán
2016–2017	Blues: St. Louis Blues; Swing	Malagueña by Ernesto Lecuona choreo. by Benoît Richaud	
2015–2016	Waltz: Nr. 10 in H minor, op. 69.2 by Frédéric Chopin; March: Storming Pleven (from The Turkish Gambit)	Lo ti penso amore performed by David Garrett, Nicole Scherzinger; Caprice No. 5 performed by Edvin Marton	The Winner Takes It All by ABBA
2014–2015	Samba: Samabando; Rhumba; Samba	Giselle by Adolphe Adam	
2013–2014	Quickstep: Jeepers Creepers by Bennett Salvay; Foxtrot: Work Song by Chantz	Vivo per lei performed by Andrea Bocelli, Hélène Ségara; Dance of the Knights (from Romeo and Juliet) by Sergei Prokofiev; Vivo per lei	
2012–2013	That's Life; Time to Swing by Helmut Lotti	Scheherazade by Nikolai Rimsky-Korsakov	

== Records and achievements ==
(with Loboda)

- Set the junior-level ice dance record for the combined total score to 164.37 points at the 2017 World Junior Championships.

== Competitive highlights ==
GP: Grand Prix; CS: Challenger Series; JGP: Junior Grand Prix

=== Skating as an Individual Neutral Athlete ===
Results in the 2026–27 season
Date	Event	SP		FS		Total	
Date	Event	P	Score	P	Score	P	Score
Oct 1–4, 2026	(Georgia (country)) 2026 CS Trialeti Trophy	6	66.90	8	95.79	6	162.69

=== For Russia ===
National
Event	24-25	25-26
Russian Champ.	10th	6th

=== With Shanaeva ===
National
Event	22–23	23–24
Russian Champ.	2nd	4th
Russian Cup Final (Note: The 2023 Russian Cup Final was renamed as the 2023 Russian Grand Prix Final.)	2nd	5th

=== With Abachkina ===
International
Event	2021–22
CS Cup of Austria	WD
CS Warsaw Cup	WD
WD = Withdrew

=== With Konkina ===
International
Event	18–19	19–20	20–21
GP Rostelecom Cup			WD
CS Asian Open Trophy		2nd	
CS Warsaw Cup		2nd	
Ice Mall Cup	3rd		
NRW Trophy		1st	
National
Russian Champ.		8th	WD
WD = Withdrew

=== With Loboda ===
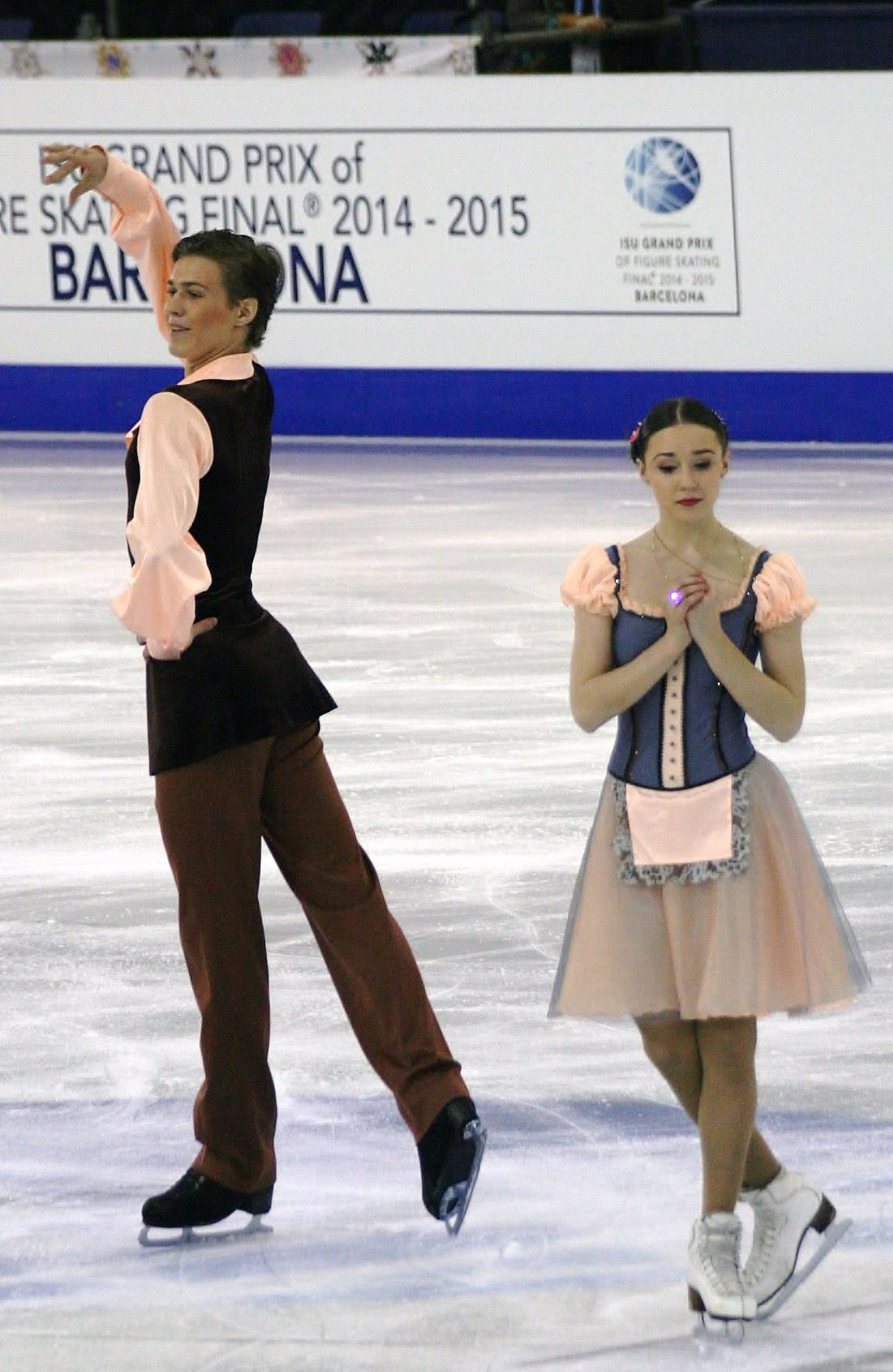
Loboda/Drozd at the 2014-15 Junior Grand Prix Final

International
Event	12–13	13–14	14–15	15–16	16–17	17–18
GP France						9th
GP Skate Canada						5th
CS Golden Spin						10th
CS Lombardia						2nd
Shanghai Trophy						4th
International: Junior
Junior Worlds				3rd	2nd	
JGP Final			2nd	2nd	2nd	
JGP Austria				1st		
JGP Estonia					1st	
JGP France			1st			
JGP Japan			2nd			
JGP Latvia		3rd				
JGP Poland		3rd				
JGP Russia					1st	
JGP Slovakia				2nd		
Ice Challenge	3rd					
National
Russian Champ.						6th
Russian Jr. Champ.	11th	5th	4th	1st	2nd	

== Detailed results ==
Small medals for short and free programs awarded only at ISU Championships.

=== With Konkina ===
2019–20 season
Date	Event	RD	FD	Total
24–29 December 2019	2020 Russian Championships	9; 69.04	8; 107.17	8; 176.21
14–17 November 2019	2019 CS Warsaw Cup	1; 71.81	2; 106.62	2; 178.43
30 October – 3 November 2019	2019 CS Asian Open Trophy	2; 70.21	3; 106.17	2; 176.38
10–11 August 2019	NRW Trophy	1; 66.81	1; 99.98	1; 166.79
2018–19 season
Date	Event	RD	FD	Total
20–23 February 2019	2019 Open Ice Mall Cup	3; 70.77	3; 101.47	3; 172.24

=== With Loboda ===
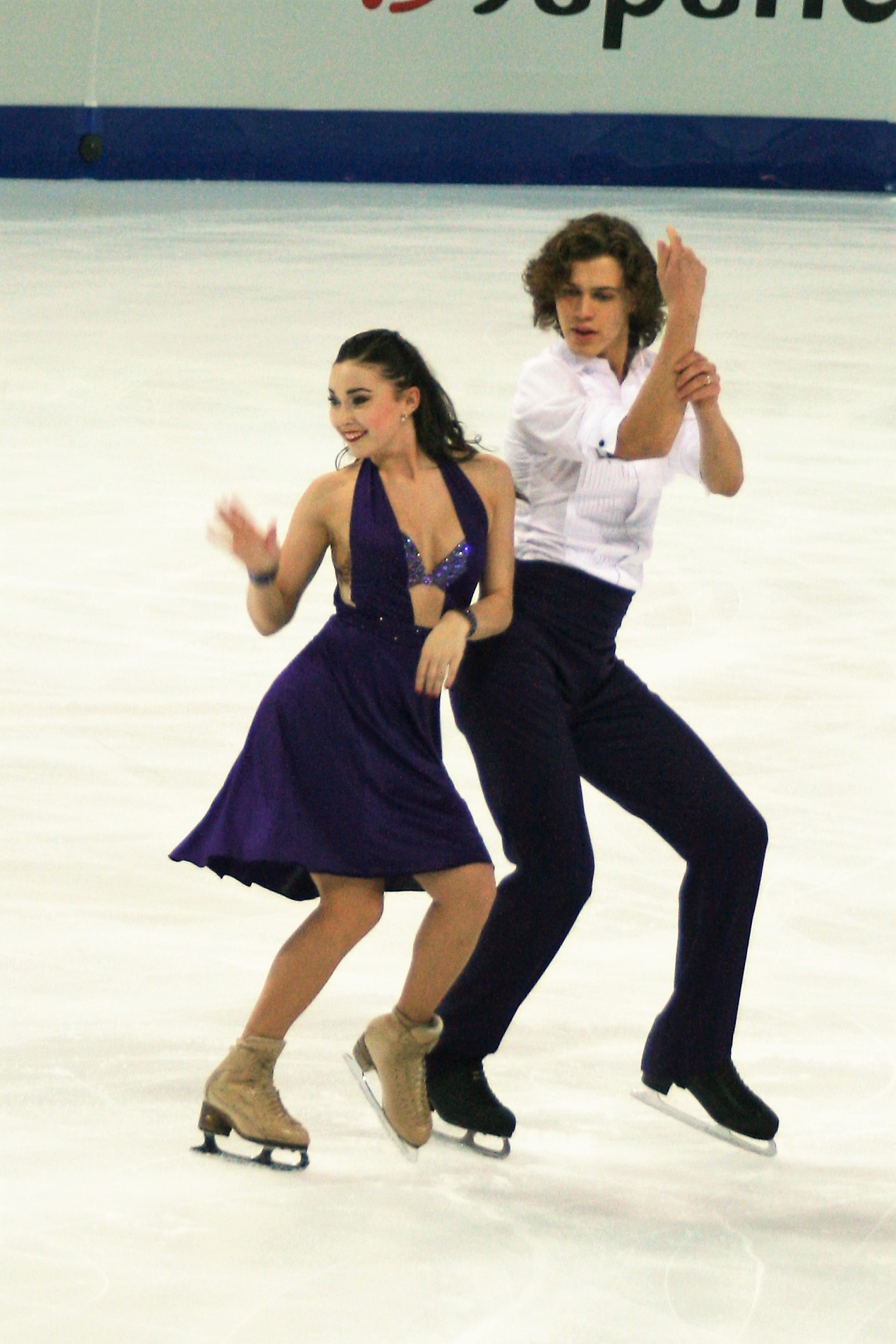
Loboda/Drozd at the 2016-16 Junior Grand Prix Final

2017–18 season
Date	Event	SD	FD	Total
21–24 December 2017	2018 Russian Championships	6; 63.07	6; 96.92	6; 159.99
6–9 December 2017	2017 CS Golden Spin of Zagreb	11; 59.42	9; 90.90	10; 150.32
24–26 November 2017	2017 Shanghai Trophy	–	4; 95.27	4; 95.27
17–19 November 2017	2017 Internationaux de France	7; 60.43	9; 85.42	9; 145.85
27–29 October 2017	2017 Skate Canada	6; 62.60	5; 93.12	5; 155.72
14–17 September 2017	2017 CS Lombardia Trophy	2; 63.34	2; 91.06	2; 154.40

2016–17 season
Date	Event	Level	SD	FD	Total
15–19 March 2017	2017 World Junior Championships	Junior	1; 67.59	2; 96.78	2; 164.37
1–5 February 2017	2017 Russian Junior Championships	Junior	1; 69.40	4; 88.59	2; 157.99
8–11 December 2016	2016−17 JGP Final	Junior	1; 67.58	2; 94.29	2; 161.87
28 September – 2 October 2016	2016 JGP Estonia	Junior	1; 65.54	1; 91.47	1; 157.01
14–18 September 2016	2016 JGP Russia	Junior	1; 64.96	1; 96.91	1; 161.87
2015–16 season
Date	Event	Level	SD	FD	Total
14–20 March 2016	2016 World Junior Championships	Junior	6; 58.93	3; 92.26	3; 151.19
19–23 January 2016	2016 Russian Junior Championships	Junior	1; 68.84	2; 96.06	1; 164.90
10–13 December 2015	2015−16 JGP Final	Junior	3; 64.01	2; 86.85	2; 150.86
9–13 September 2015	2015 JGP Austria	Junior	1; 61.73	1; 91.91	1; 153.64
19–23 August 2015	2015 JGP Slovakia	Junior	1; 60.48	2; 86.90	2; 147.38
2014–15 season
Date	Event	Level	SD	FD	Total
4–7 February 2015	2015 Russian Junior Championships	Junior	2; 61.84	5; 78.53	4; 140.37
11–14 December 2014	2014–15 JGP Final	Junior	2; 53.72	2; 82.59	2; 136.31
10–14 September 2014	2014 JGP Japan	Junior	3; 52.25	1; 81.73	2; 133.98
20–24 August 2014	2014 JGP France	Junior	2; 50.10	1; 82.34	1; 132.44
2013–14 season
Date	Event	Level	SD	FD	Total
23–25 January 2014	2014 Russian Junior Championships	Junior	5; 58.53	3; 86.66	5; 145.19
19–21 September 2013	2013 JGP Poland	Junior	3; 54.55	3; 79.56	3; 134.11
29–31 August 2013	2013 JGP Latvia	Junior	3; 50.93	1; 75.50	3; 126.43
2012–13 season
Date	Event	Level	SD	FD	Total
1–3 February 2013	2013 Russian Junior Championships	Junior	12; 41.22	11; 66.04	11; 107.26
