= Rayudu Arun Kumar =

Indian Figure skater

Personal information
- Native name: Arun Rayudu
- Nationality: Indian
- Born: 23 December 1999 (age 25) Amalapuram, Andhra Pradesh India
- Education: B Tech Mechanical Engineering, Vignan's Institute of Information Technology
- Occupation: Indian figure skater
- Years active: 2004 – present
- Height: 5.9 ft (180 cm)

Sport
- Country: India
- Sport: Artistic roller skating

Achievements and titles
- World finals: 2017 World Roller Games, 18th Asian Roller Skating Championship

Rayudu Arun Kumar (born 23 December 1999) is an Indian artistic roller skater from Visakhapatnam, Andhra Pradesh. He is an Asian Silver Medallist, ranked Asian No.2 in the senior category and was world No.5 in the under-19 category. He has been a national champion for the last 13 years. He has been playing for Team India since 2014. He has also been the All India Inter-University Champion for three years. He is considered to be one of the best figure skaters in India. He has been the captain of the Andhra Pradesh Roller Skating Team since 2017.

== Career ==
He won medals nationally and internationally, including 12 gold, 16 silver and 11 bronze medals at India's Roller Skating National Championships and 22 gold, 15 silver, and 12 bronze medals at the Andhra Pradesh Roller Skating State Championships. He won 2 silver and 1 bronze medal at the Asian Roller Skating Championship.

He has served as the captain of the Andhra Pradesh Roller Skating Team since 2017. Under his captaincy, the team won the National Championship for 3 Years.

Arun hit a hat-trick in roller sports by bagging a gold medal in the National Inter-University Roller Sports tournament 2020, At the All India Inter-University Games, he represented Jawaharlal Nehru Technological University, Kakinada for three years and was the All India Inter-University Champion. He is the first individual athlete from Jawaharlal Nehru Technological University to secure a gold medal at the All India Inter-University Games. His skating partner for both pair and couple dance events is Farheen Shaik. He debuted for Team India in 2014 at the 16th Asian Roller Skating Championship held in Haining, where he placed fourth.

In 2015, he participated in the 21st Junior World Roller Figure Skating Championship in Cali.In 2016, he won 1 Silver and 1 Bronze in the Open (Senior) Category in the Pair Skating and Couple Dance categories with his partner Shaik at the 17th Asian Roller Skating Championship in Lishui.He was ranked World No. 5 in the Under 19 Category in the 2017 World Roller Games. In 2018, he secured a silver medal in the Open (Senior) Category at the 18th Asian Roller Skating Championship in Namwon City, South Korea.

== Milestones ==
- 1 Gold & 1 Silver Medal, in his 1st State Level Competition (2005–06)
- 1 Gold Medal in his 1st National Level Competition (2007–08)
- Achieved 5th Rank in the World Roller Games (2017–18)
- 1st International medal (1 Silver & 1 Bronze) in 17th Asian Roller Skating Championship (2016–17)
