= Svetlana Liapina =

Soviet ice dancer and skating coach

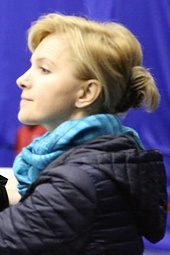
Liapina in 2016

Svetlana Evgenievna Lyapina (Russian: Светлана Евгеньевна Ляпина) (born January 14, 1967) is a Soviet figure skating coach and former ice dancer. With partner Georgi "Gorsha" Sur, she won two medals at the World Junior Championships for the Soviet Union. As a coach, she coached Australian ice dancers Portia Rigby and Francis Rigby, as well as many others in Australia.

She is the mother of Russian ice dancer Jonathan Guerreiro.

== Competitive highlights ==
(with Sur)

International
Event	83–84	84–85	85–86	86–87	87–88	88–89
NHK Trophy					2nd	
Skate America						2nd
Nebelhorn Trophy				2nd		
Prize of Moscow News			8th			
Winter Universiade				3rd		1st
International: Junior
World Junior Champ.	3rd	2nd				
National
Soviet Champ.			5th		5th	
