= Stefania Yakovleva =

Cypriot figure skater (born 2007)

Personal information
- Native name: Стефания Яковлева (Russian); Στεφανία Γιακόβλεβα (Greek)
- Born: 29 October 2007 (age 18) St. Petersburg, Russia
- Home town: Limassol, Cyprus
- Height: 1.65 m (5 ft 5 in)

Figure skating career
- Country: Cyprus
- Discipline: Women's singles
- Coach: Sergei Komolov; Kristina Shoshina
- Skating club: Achilleas FSC
- Began skating: 2012

Medal record
Representing Cyprus

Stefania Yakovleva (Russian: Стефания Яковлева; Greek: Στεφανία Γιακόβλεβα; born 29 October 2007) is a Russian-born Cypriot figure skater. Competing in women's singles, she is the 2025 Gordion Cup champion and the 2025 Robin Cousins Cup silver medalist. She is the first Cypriot skater to qualify for the Winter Youth Olympic Games.

== Personal life ==
Yakovleva was born on 29 October 2007 in St. Petersburg, Russia. She has a brother. Yakovleva and her family moved to Cyprus in 2017 due to her father's job. She began representing the country at a relative's suggestion in 2018, although she had never previously competed for Russia. Her favorite skater as a child was Elena Radionova, and she looks up to Amber Glenn.

Due to insufficient training conditions in Limassol, Yakovleva relocated to Dubai at age 14 with a Cypriot Skating Federation representative for better training opportunities. She splits time between Limassol, Dubai, and St. Petersburg.

Yakovleva enrolled in an American online school due to the restraints of competing at an international level.

== Career ==
=== Early career ===
Yakovleva began skating at five years old at a doctor's recommendation due to her asthma. She trained with in Valentina Chebotareva's group in Russia, working with coaches and choreographers including Nikita Pcheliakov, Olga Zotova, and Tatiana Yurisheva. After moving to Cyprus, Yakovleva trained for several years at the My Mall Limassol ice rink before outgrowing the small rink.

Yakovleva competed internationally at the basic novice level in the 2018–19 season, intermediate novice in 2019–20, and advanced novice in 2020–21.

Yakovleva was named "Junior of the Year" by the Cyprus Olympic Committee twice.

=== 2021–22 season: Junior international debut ===
In 2021, Yakovleva moved to Dubai to train with Russian coach and choreographer Sergei Komolov after Yakovleva's mother had reached out to him. The team trains in both Dubai and Saint Petersburg. While working one-on-one with Komolov, Yakovleva began training triple jumps for the first time.

Yakovleva began competing as a junior internationally in 2021. She withdrew from her first Junior Grand Prix event, 2021 JGP Courchevel II, and placed fifteenth at her second event in 2021 JGP Gdańsk. Yakovleva placed thirty-ninth in the short program at the 2022 World Junior Championships and failed to advance to the free skating.

=== 2022–23 season ===
After initially being assigned to the ultimately cancelled 2022 JGP Armenia, Yakovleva placed nineteenth at 2022 JGP Poland II and twenty-first at 2022 JGP Italy. In December, she won her first international medals at the junior level, bronze at both the 2022 Bosphorus Cup and the 2022 Latvia Trophy.

In January, Yakovleva was the only figure skater to be named on the Cypriot team for the 2023 European Youth Olympic Winter Festival. She placed seventeenth in the short program and ninth in the free skating to finish eleventh overall, a result that Cyprus Ice Skating Federation president Takis Georgiou called "a great honor for the [federation], but also for Cyprus in general". Georgiou also said that he felt "special satisfaction and pride" in Yakovleva's performance, with other members of the Cyprus Olympic Committee also commending her performance. Yakovleva followed the Youth Olympic Festival by earning the silver medal at the 2023 Bavarian Open in February.

Yakovleva was again named to the 2023 World Junior Championships team. She improved 22 places from her 2022 finish to end up seventeenth overall, a result her coach Sergei Komolov called "significant progress". He also noted that she was working on learning a triple Axel. Yakovleva's placement qualified Cyprus for a historic quota for the 2024 Winter Youth Olympics, the first time Cyprus had qualified for an Olympic event on ice. She noted she was satisfied with her performances and shocked to have qualified for the Winter Youth Olympics.

Yakovleva ended the season by winning the 2023 Abu Dhabi Classic Trophy and the junior title at the Cyprus Championships.

=== 2023–24 season ===
Yakovleva suffered her first major injury over the summer in 2023, sustaining a stress fracture. She also contracted COVID-19 and noted that it was a "very difficult year" where skating was "not consistent or easy". Yakovleva competed at one Junior Grand Prix event, finishing eighteenth in Osaka. She later placed fourth at the 2023 Denis Ten Memorial Challenge.

In January, Yakovleva won the silver medal at 2024 Skate Helena. She was officially named to the Cypriot quota for the 2024 Winter Youth Olympics in Gangwon Province, South Korea that she had qualified at the 2023 World Junior Championships, something that she called a "major achievement" in her career. Yakovleva was the first figure skater to represent Cyprus at the event, and it was the first time the country had been represented in multiple sports. However, she ultimately withdrew from the event prior to the short program. While Yakovleva was at the Youth Olympic Games, she was named as one of the seven Cyprus Olympic Committee athletes included in the "Reward Scheme for Young Athletes under 18 years old, as emerging talents in sport" sponsored by the Bank of Cyprus.

=== 2024–25 season ===
Yakovleva again competed at only one Junior Grand Prix event to start the season, finishing fifteenth in 2024 JGP Turkey. She went on to place sixth at 2024 Tallinn Trophy and seventh at 2025 Skate Helena before winning the 2025 Union Trophy.

Ahead of the 2025 World Junior Championships, Yakovleva changed her free skating program from an ABBA medley to the soundtrack from The Artist. She finished the event in twenty-second place overall. Yakovleva then closed out the season by winning gold at the Triglav Trophy in April.

=== 2025–26 season: Senior international debut ===
Yakovleva moved up to the senior level internationally in 2025 and added Kristina Shoshina to her coaching team. She withdrew from the 2025 Asian Open Trophy and instead opened the season at the 2025 Robin Cousins Cup. Yakovleva described the preparation for Robin Cousins Cup as tough and noted her physical shape "wasn’t as good as it can be". Her coach was also unable to accompany her due to visa issues. The event served as one of the Cyprus Ice Skating Federation's final deciding events between naming Yakovleva or Marilena Kitromilis as the representative for the final 2026 Winter Olympics qualifying event, the Skate to Milano. Yakovleva placed second behind Sarina Joos while Kitromilis finished sixth. The silver was her first medal at the senior international level. She subsequently withdrew from the 2025 CS Kinoshita Group Cup. Yakovleva won the final deciding competition in September a week prior to the qualifier.

At the Skate to Milano in Beijing, Yakovleva placed fifth in both the short program and the free skating to finish sixth overall with personal best scores across all three segments. Although she called it one of her best skates in competition, she felt some mixed emotions due to skating cleaner free skates in practice. Yakovleva noted the "immense pressure" leading up to the competition, as well as being "amazed" by the size of the rink. She expressed that she was "very sad" that Skate to Milano was her only chance for Olympic qualification as she was ineligible for the 2025 World Figure Skating Championships, the first 2026 Olympic qualifying event, due to her age. Yakovleva narrowly missed qualifying a spot for Cyprus by 2.23 points following Adeliia Petrosian (AIN), Anastasiia Gubanova for Georgia, Loena Hendrickx for Belgium, Viktoriia Safonova (AIN), and Zhang Ruiyang for China finishing in the available quota spots. Her result earned Cyprus the first alternate position. At the time of the competition, Yakovleva noted that while she received federation support, the Cyprus Olympic Committee was funding another skater.

In October, Yakovleva finished eleventh at the 2025 CS Trialeti Trophy, before winning her first international title at the 2025 Gordion Cup. She then rounded out her Challenger Series by placing tenth at the 2025 CS Warsaw Cup and eighth at the 2025 CS Golden Spin of Zagreb.

At the 2026 European Championships in Sheffield, Yakovleva placed twelfth in the short program and eleventh in the free skating, finishing in twelfth place overall.

At the 2026 World Championships, she finished 33rd in the short program segment, failing to qualify for the free skate.

== Programs ==
Competition programs by season
| Season | Short program | Free skate program |
|---|---|---|
| 2021–22 | La Cena: From La Califfa; Composed by Ennio Morricone; Choreo. by Nikita Pcheliakov, Olga Zotova | Mathilde soundtrack: Composed by Marco Beltrami; Choreo. by Nikita Pcheliakov, Olga Zotova; Tracks used: 1. Exposed; 2. Obstacle Course; 3. Mathilde and the Balloon Ride |
| 2021–22 | The Witch Song: Performed by Aurea; Choreo. by Sergei Komolov | Medley: 1. Awakening; Composed by Jennifer Thomas; 2. Cloak and Dagger; Composed by Eternal Eclipse; 3. Rise Up; Performed by Andra Day; 4. Revolution; Composed by Eternal Eclipse; Choreo. by Sergei Komolov |
| 2022–23 | Can't Help Falling in Love (Dark Version): Performed by Tommee Profitt feat. Brooke Griffith; Choreo. by Sergei Komolov | Shreya Ghoshal medley: 1. Nagada Sang Dhol; Performed by Shreya Ghoshal, Osman Mir; 2. Deewani Mastani; Performed by Shreya Ghoshal; 3. Chikni Chameli; Performed by Shreya Ghoshal; Choreo. by Sergei Komolov |
| 2023–24 | Schindler's List: Composed by John Williams; Choreo. by Sergei Komolov | Selections from Cirque du Soleil: Choreo. by Sergei Komolov |
| 2024–25 | Gladiator soundtrack: Composed by Hans Zimmer; Choreo. by Sergei Komolov | ABBA medley: 1. Mamma Mia; Performed by ABBA; 2. The Winner Takes It All; Performed by Sarah Dawn Finer; 3. Gimme! Gimme! Gimme! (A Man After Midnight); Performed by Sofy; Choreo. by Sergei Komolov |
| 2024–25 | Gladiator | The Artist soundtrack: Composed by Ludovic Bource; Tracks used: 1. George Valentin; 2. Peggy and George; Singin' in the Rain: Performed by Gene Kelly, Ju Firebird; Choreo. by Sergei Komolov |
| 2025–26 | The Nutcracker: Composed by Pyotr Ilyich Tchaikovsky; Choreo. by Sergei Komolov | The Artist soundtrack: Composed by Ludovic Bource; Tracks used: 1. George Valentin; 2. Peggy and George; Singin' in the Rain: Performed by Gene Kelly, Ju Firebird; Choreo. by Sergei Komolov |

== Competitive highlights ==
- JGP – ISU Junior Grand Prix Series
- CS – ISU Challenger Series
- TBD – To be decided
- WD – Withdrew
- C – Event cancelled

Competition placements at senior level
| Season | 2025–26 |
|---|---|
| World Championships | 33rd |
| European Championships | 12th |
| CS Golden Spin | 8th |
| CS Trialeti Trophy | 11th |
| CS Warsaw Cup | 10th |
| Gordion Cup | 1st |
| Robin Cousins Cup | 2nd |
| Skate to Milano | 6th |

Competition placements at junior level
| Season | 2021–22 | 2022–23 | 2023–24 | 2024–25 |
|---|---|---|---|---|
| Winter Youth Olympics | | | WD | |
| World Junior Championships | 39th | 17th | | 22nd |
| Cyprus Championships | | 1st | | |
| JGP Armenia | | C | | |
| JGP Italy | | 21st | | |
| JGP Japan | | | 18th | |
| JGP Poland | 15th | 19th | | |
| JGP Turkey | | | | 15th |
| Bavarian Open | 9th | 2nd | | |
| Bosphorus Cup | | 3rd | | |
| Cup of Nice | | 4th | | |
| Denis Ten Memorial Challenge | | | 4th | |
| European Youth Olympic Festival | | 11th | | |
| Latvia Trophy | | 3rd | | |
| Santa Claus Cup | 17th | | | |
| Skate Helena | | | 2nd | 7th |
| Tallinn Trophy | 8th | | | 6th |
| Triglav Trophy | | | | 1st |
| Union Trophy | | 1st | | 1st |

== Detailed results ==
ISU personal best scores in the +5/-5 GOE System
| Segment | Type | Score | Event |
|---|---|---|---|
| Total | TSS | 177.53 | 2025 Skate to Milano |
| Short program | TSS | 59.37 | 2025 Skate to Milano |
| Short program | TES | 33.76 | 2025 Skate to Milano |
| Short program | PCS | 25.61 | 2025 Skate to Milano |
| Free skating | TSS | 118.16 | 2025 Skate to Milano |
| Free skating | TES | 64.49 | 2026 European Championships |
| Free skating | PCS | 55.08 | 2025 Skate to Milano |

=== Senior level ===
Results in the 2025–26 season
| Date | Event | SP | | FS | | Total | |
| Date | Event | P | Score | P | Score | P | Score |
|---|---|---|---|---|---|---|---|
| 21–22 Aug 2025 | (United Kingdom) 2025 Robin Cousins Cup | 2 | 58.28 | 2 | 119.71 | 2 | 177.99 |
| 18–21 Sep 2025 | (China) 2025 Skate to Milano | 5 | 59.37 | 5 | 118.16 | 6 | 177.53 |
| 8–11 Oct 2025 | (Georgia (country)) 2025 CS Trialeti Trophy | 13 | 50.75 | 9 | 108.00 | 11 | 158.75 |
| 23–25 Oct 2025 | (Turkey) 2025 Gordion Cup | 1 | 54.93 | 1 | 95.97 | 1 | 150.90 |
| 19–23 Nov 2025 | (Poland) 2025 CS Warsaw Cup | 11 | 50.34 | 10 | 98.51 | 10 | 148.85 |
| 3–6 Dec 2025 | (Croatia) 2025 CS Golden Spin of Zagreb | 10 | 55.94 | 6 | 111.24 | 8 | 167.18 |
| 13–18 Jan 2026 | (United Kingdom) 2026 European Championships | 12 | 56.16 | 11 | 117.01 | 12 | 173.17 |
| Mar 24–29, 2026 | (Czech Republic) 2026 World Championships | 33 | 38.53 | —N/a | —N/a | 33 | 38.53 |

=== Junior level ===
Results in the 2021–22 season
| Date | Event | SP | | FS | | Total | |
| Date | Event | P | Score | P | Score | P | Score |
|---|---|---|---|---|---|---|---|
| 29 Sep – 2 Oct 2021 | 2021 JGP Poland | 15 | 40.80 | 15 | 74.05 | 15 | 114.85 |
| 16–21 Nov 2021 | (Estonia) 2021 Tallinn Trophy | 5 | 48.50 | 10 | 69.67 | 8 | 118.17 |
| 6–12 Dec 2021 | (Hungary) 2021 Santa Claus Cup | 22 | 43.14 | 16 | 84.03 | 17 | 127.17 |
| 18–23 Jan 2022 | (Germany) 2022 Bavarian Open | 8 | 39.25 | 10 | 73.61 | 9 | 112.86 |
| 13–17 Apr 2022 | (Estonia) 2022 World Junior Championships | 39 | 38.64 | —N/a | —N/a | 39 | 38.64 |

Results in the 2022–23 season
| Date | Event | SP | | FS | | Total | |
| Date | Event | P | Score | P | Score | P | Score |
|---|---|---|---|---|---|---|---|
| 6–8 Oct 2022 | 2022 JGP Poland II | 26 | 43.41 | 16 | 91.86 | 19 | 135.27 |
| 12–15 Oct 2022 | 2022 JGP Italy | 26 | 42.38 | 20 | 86.94 | 21 | 129.32 |
| 18–23 Oct 2022 | (France) 2022 Trophée Métropole Nice Côte d'Azur | 7 | 39.86 | 2 | 90.14 | 4 | 130.00 |
| 29 Nov – 3 Dec 2022 | (Turkey) 2022 Bosphorus Cup | 5 | 45.99 | 3 | 109.21 | 3 | 155.20 |
| 17–18 Dec 2022 | 2022 Latvia Trophy | 1 | 56.73 | 6 | 76.39 | 3 | 133.12 |
| 25–27 Jan 2023 | (Italy) 2023 European Youth Olympic Festival | 17 | 41.36 | 9 | 84.34 | 11 | 125.70 |
| 31 Jan – 5 Feb 2023 | (Germany) 2023 Bavarian Open | 3 | 50.20 | 1 | 99.64 | 2 | 149.84 |
| 27 Feb – 3 Mar 2023 | (Canada) 2023 World Junior Championships | 22 | 50.08 | 16 | 94.15 | 17 | 144.23 |
| 17–19 Mar 2023 | (United Arab Emirates) 2023 Abu Dhabi Classic Trophy | 3 | 49.02 | 1 | 97.48 | 1 | 146.50 |
| 6 May 2023 | 2023 Cyprus Championships | 1 | 46.35 | 1 | 100.21 | 1 | 146.56 |

Results in the 2023–24 season
| Date | Event | SP | | FS | | Total | |
| Date | Event | P | Score | P | Score | P | Score |
|---|---|---|---|---|---|---|---|
| 13–16 Sep 2023 | 2023 JGP Japan | 13 | 51.47 | 22 | 71.84 | 18 | 123.31 |
| 1–4 Nov 2023 | (Kazakhstan) 2023 Denis Ten Memorial Challenge | 1 | 55.88 | 4 | 92.64 | 4 | 148.52 |
| 2–6 Jan 2024 | (Serbia) 2024 Skate Helena | 3 | 50.38 | 3 | 97.58 | 2 | 147.96 |

Results in the 2024–25 season
| Date | Event | SP | | FS | | Total | |
| Date | Event | P | Score | P | Score | P | Score |
|---|---|---|---|---|---|---|---|
| 4–7 Sep 2024 | 2024 JGP Turkey | 18 | 45.60 | 16 | 89.61 | 15 | 135.21 |
| 11–17 Nov 2024 | (Estonia) 2024 Tallinn Trophy | 8 | 50.68 | 6 | 102.85 | 6 | 153.53 |
| 29 Jan – 2 Feb 2025 | (Serbia) 2025 Skate Helena | 8 | 46.40 | 8 | 87.60 | 7 | 134.00 |
| 4–9 Feb 2025 | (United Arab Emirates) 2025 Union Trophy | 1 | 55.17 | 1 | 104.15 | 1 | 159.32 |
| 25 Feb – 2 Mar 2025 | (Hungary) 2025 World Junior Championships | 19 | 55.45 | 21 | 102.67 | 22 | 158.12 |
| 9–13 Apr 2025 | (Slovenia) 2025 Triglav Trophy | 1 | 57.26 | 2 | 100.25 | 1 | 157.51 |
