= Cyprus Figure Skating Championships =

Recurring figure skating competition

- Status: Active
- Genre: National championships
- Frequency: Annual
- Venue: My Mall Limassol
- Location: Limassol
- Country: Cyprus
- Inaugurated: 2013
- Organizer: Cyprus Skating Federation

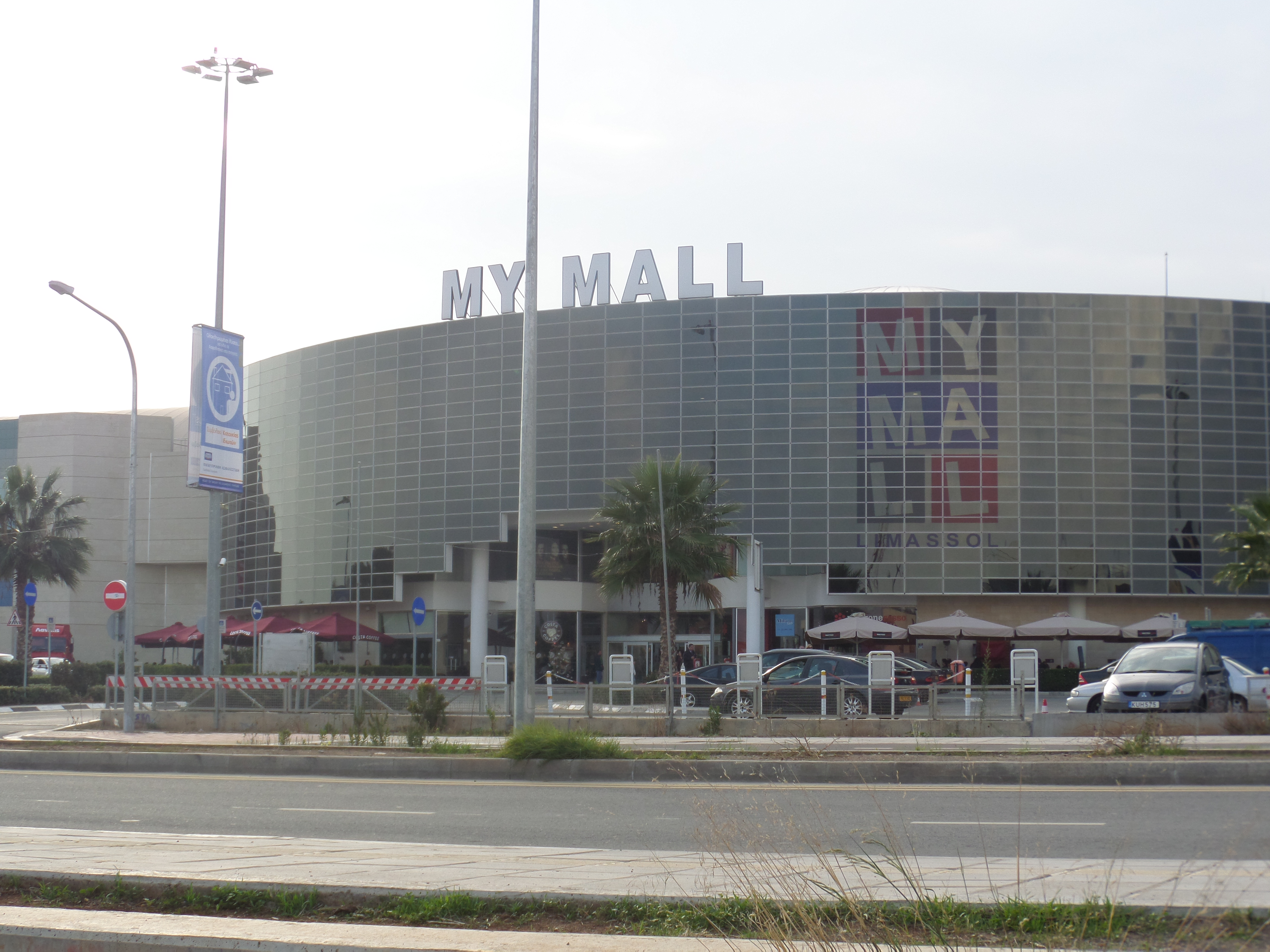
The Cyprus Figure Skating Championships are held at the My Mall Limassol, a shopping mall in suburban Zakaki.

The Cyprus Figure Skating Championships are an annual figure skating competition organized by the Cyprus Skating Federation to crown the national champions of Cyprus. Medals are awarded in men's singles, women's singles, and ice dance at the senior and junior levels, although each discipline may not necessarily be held every year due to a lack of participants. The Cyprus Skating Federation was founded in 1992 in Nicosia, which at that pointed had the only ice rink in the country, and became a member of the International Skating Union in 1995. When the ice rink in Nicosia closed in 2002, the Cyprus Skating Federation was forced to suspend activities. The opening of the My Mall Limassol, a shopping center in Zakaki, a suburb of Limasso, allowed for skating to again take place in Cyprus, as the mall featured an ice rink on its lower level. Since 2013, the Cyprus Championships have been held at the My Mall Limassol.

== Senior medalists ==
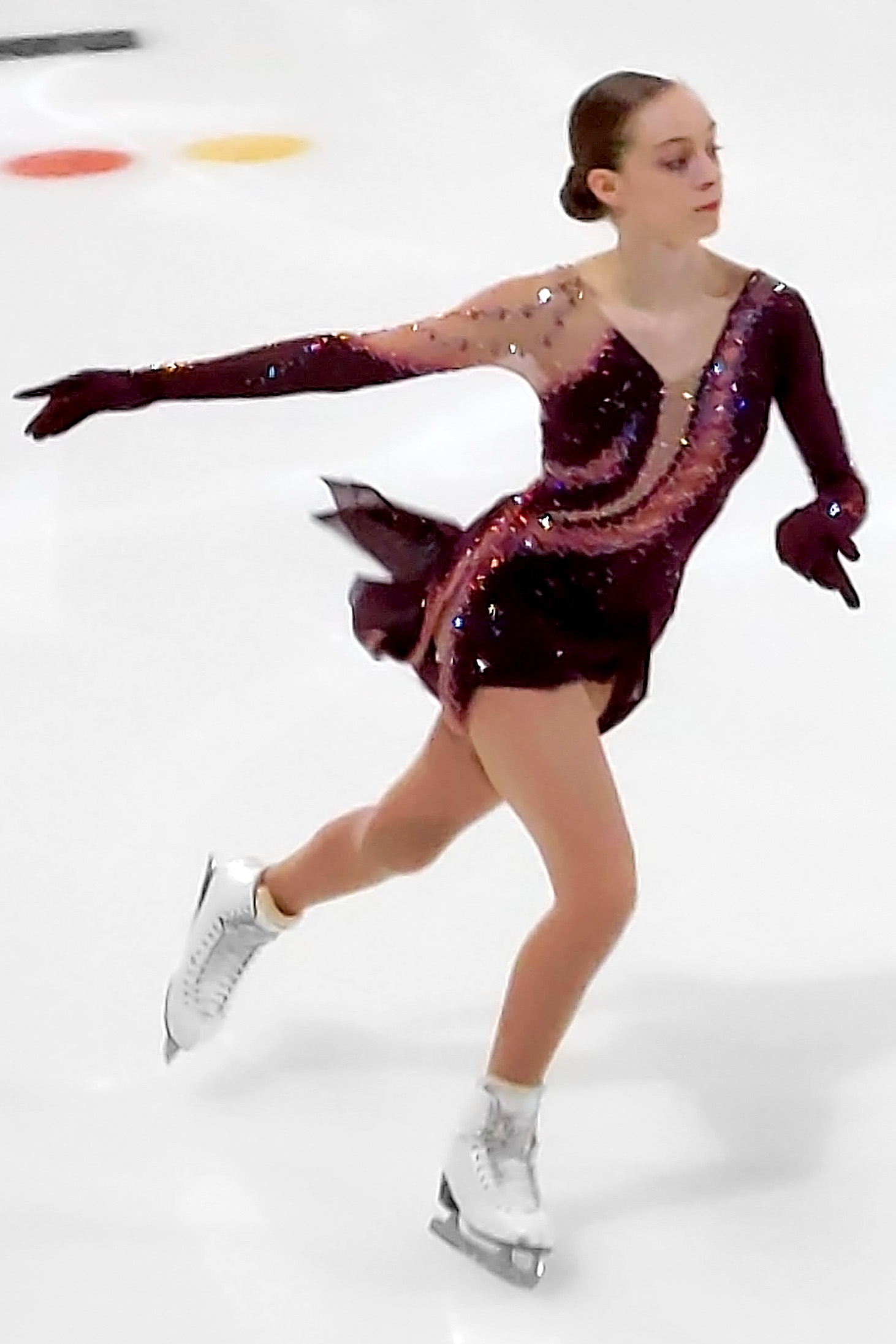
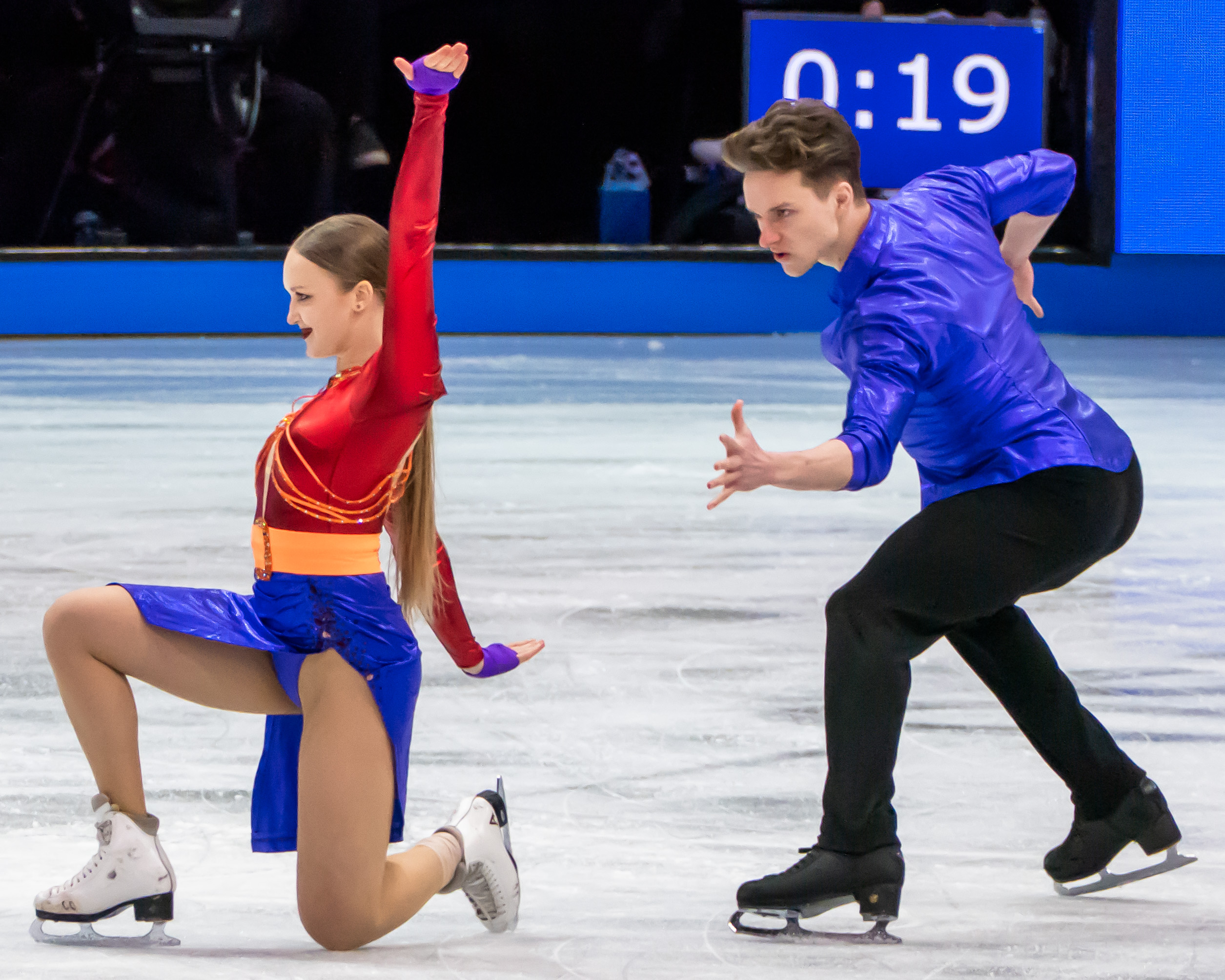
Some of the skaters who have represented Cyprus in international competition: Marilena Kitromilis (women's singles); and Angelina Kudryavtseva and Ilia Karankevich (ice dance).

=== Women's singles ===
Women's event medalists
Year	Location	Gold	Silver	Bronze	Ref.
No senior women's competitors prior to 2018
2018	Limassol	Polina Ustinova	No other competitors		
2019	Limassol	Polina Ustinova	No other competitors		
2020–22	No competitions held				
2023	Limassol	Marilena Kitromilis	No other competitors		

== Junior medalists ==
=== Men's singles ===
Junior men's event medalists
Year	Location	Gold	Silver	Bronze	Ref.
No junior men's competitors prior to 2015
2015	Limassol	Nikita Vitryanyuk	No other competitors		
No junior men's competitors since 2015

=== Women's singles ===
Junior women's event medalists
Year	Location	Gold	Silver	Bronze	Ref.
2013	Limassol	Kristina Dubrovskaya	No other competitors		
2014	Limassol	Polina Ustinova	No other competitors		
2015	Limassol	Polina Ustinova	No other competitors		
2016	Limassol	Daniella Ipsarides	Polina Ustinova	No other competitors	
2017	Limassol	Daniella Ipsarides	Polina Ustinova	Danae Hadjimitsi	
2018	Limassol	Chryso Georgiou	Daniella Ipsarides	Eliana Kalogirou	
2019	Limassol	Ekaterina Luneva	Eliana Kalogirou	Giorgia Sechi	
2020–22	No competitions held				
2023	Limassol	Stefania Yakovleva	No other competitors		

=== Ice dance ===
Junior ice dance event medalists
Year	Location	Gold	Silver	Bronze	Ref.
No junior ice dance competitors prior to 2023
2023	Limassol	Angelina Kudryavtseva; Ilia Karankevich	No other competitors		
