= Nicosia Mall =

Shopping mall in Cyprus

Coordinates: 35.13442526018831°N 33.278879008206125°E

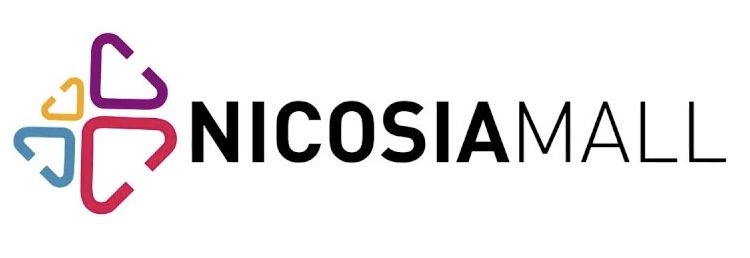

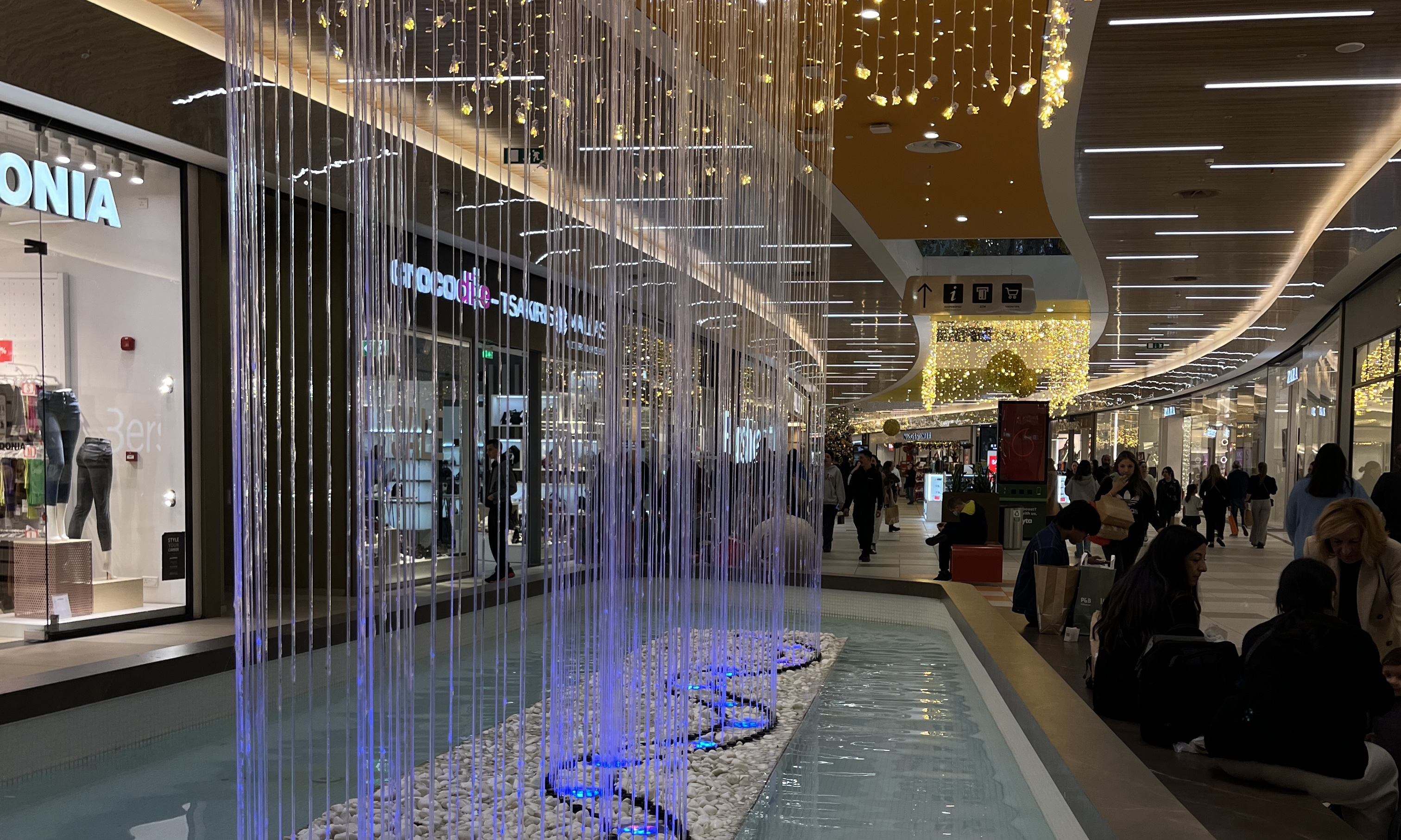
- Inside view of Nicosia Mall
- Location: Nicosia, Cyprus
- Address: 2 Madrid Street, 2306 Nicosia, Cyprus.
- Opened: November 21, 2018
- Developer: Nicosia Malls Properties (NMP) Ltd.
- Num. of stores: 140+
- Floor area: 82,000 square metres (880,000 sq ft)
- Floors: 3 (UG, GF, 1)
- Parking: 1,700 spots
- Public transit: N1 16 400 405 NICOSIA MALL
- Website: https://nicosiamall.com

Nicosia Mall is a shopping mall located in the Lakatamia-Anthoupolis area, southwest of the centre of Nicosia, capital of Cyprus. It opened in November 2018 and is the largest mall in Cyprus.

== History ==
Plans for the mall were announced in 2010. Construction of the mall began in 2011 but work was suspended during an economic crisis in 2013. In 2017, Bank of Cyprus supported a €25 million refinancing and restructuring of the Nicosia Mall development, becoming a shareholder in the parent company, NCMH Nicosia Mall Holdings Ltd. The move helped construction resume in 2017, and the project was then completed in 14 months. After it opened on 21 November 2018, it averaged 407,000 visitors a month (3.7 million in total) in the first eight months of 2019. In late 2019, Bank of Cyprus sold its 64% stake in the Nicosia Mall for around €96m to buyers including retailers with stores in the mall.

In early 2020, during the COVID-19 pandemic in Cyprus, Nicosia Mall closed all its stores apart from the Athienitis supermarket, though some stores later operated 'pick-up' services allowing customers to collect online or telephone orders. All shopping malls were closed during the 2020 Christmas period, finally reopening in February 2021.

== Facilities ==
The Mall has a total floor area of 82,000 m^{2} (880,000 sq ft), making it the largest mall in Cyprus; it is also the largest in terms of number of outlets. It has 48,000 m^{2} (520,000 sq ft) of retail space provided by around 140 outlets ranged over three floor levels, with mostly underground parking for 1,700 cars. It also houses a food market and a six-screen Rio Premier cinema which also offers open air cinema screenings.

== Transport access ==
Nicosia Mall is situated on the south side of the A9 motorway, northwest of the Anthoupoli interchange. It is connected to the city via four bus routes.

== See also ==
- Nicosia District
- List of shopping malls in Cyprus
