= 2019–20 figure skating season =

Competitive figure skating year, 2019/7/1 to 2020/6/30

- Date: July 1, 2019 – June 30, 2020
- Previous: 2018–19
- Next: 2020–21

The 2019–20 figure skating season began on July 1, 2019, and ended on June 30, 2020. During this season, elite skaters competed at the 2020 European Championships, Four Continents Championships, and World Junior Championships, although the World Championships were cancelled due to the COVID-19 pandemic. They also competed in elite events such as the Grand Prix series and Junior Grand Prix series, culminating in the Grand Prix Final, and the Challenger Series.

== Season notes ==
=== Age eligibility ===
Skaters were eligible to compete in International Skating Union (ISU) events at the junior or senior levels according to their age. These rules may not have applied to non-ISU events such as national championships.

Level	Date of birth
Junior (females in all disciplines; males in singles)	Born between July 1, 2000 & June 30, 2006
Junior (males in pairs & ice dance)	Born between July 1, 1998 & June 30, 2006
Senior (all disciplines)	Born before July 1, 2004

== Changes ==
If skaters of different nationalities formed a team, the ISU required that they choose one country to represent. The date provided is the date when the change occurred or, if not available, the date when the change was announced.

=== Partnership changes ===
Date	Skaters	Disc.	Type	Notes	Ref.
July 3, 2019	(Canada) Chloe Choinard / Mathieu Ostiguy	Pairs	Dissolved		
July 8, 2019	(Russia) Ekaterina Bobrova / Dmitri Soloviev	Ice dance	Dissolved	Bobrova retired.	
July 9, 2019	(Russia) Sofia Polishchuk / German Shamraev	Ice dance	Dissolved		
July 13, 2019	(Germany) Talisa Thomalla / Robert Kunkel	Pairs	Dissolved		
July 13, 2019	(Germany) Annika Hocke / Robert Kunkel	Pairs	Formed		
July 21, 2019	(Armenia) Tina Garabedian / Simon Proulx-Sénécal	Ice dance	Formed		
July 26, 2019	(Japan) Riku Miura / Shoya Ichihashi	Pairs	Dissolved		
July 26, 2019	(United States) Eva Pate / Logan Bye	Ice dance	Formed		
July 28, 2019	(Spain) Laura Barquero / Tòn Cónsul	Pairs	Formed		
July 29, 2019	(Russia) Alla Loboda / Anton Shibnev	Ice dance	Dissolved	Loboda retired.	
August 1, 2019	(Russia) Svetlana Lizunova / Alexander Vakhnov	Ice dance	Formed		
August 3, 2019	(Hungary) Ioulia Chtchetinina / Márk Magyar	Pairs	Formed	For Hungary	
August 5, 2019	(Japan) Riku Miura / Ryuichi Kihara	Pairs	Formed		
August 15, 2019	(Canada) Deanna Stellato-Dudek / Maxime Deschamps	Pairs	Formed	For Canada	
August 17, 2019	(Belarus) Anna Kublikova / Yuri Hulitski	Ice dance	Dissolved	Kublikova retired.	
August 17, 2019	(Finland) Arina Klinovitskaya / Jussiville Partanen	Ice dance	Formed		
August 26, 2019	(France) Natacha Lagouge / Arnaud Caffa	Ice dance	Formed		
September 20, 2019	(Russia) Amina Atakhanova / Nikita Volodin	Pairs	Dissolved	Atakhanova retired.	
September 20, 2019	(Russia) Taisiya Sobinina / Nikita Volodin	Pairs	Formed		
September 26, 2019	(Japan) Kana Muramoto / Daisuke Takahashi	Ice dance	Formed		
December 10, 2019	(Israel) Shira Ichilov / Laurent Abecassis	Ice dance	Formed	For Israel	
December 12, 2019	(Italy) Chiara Calderone / Pietro Papetti	Ice dance	Dissolved		
December 15, 2019	(Belarus) Viktoria Semenjuk / Ilya Yukhimuk	Ice dance	Formed	For Belarus	
January 7, 2020	(Germany) Charise Matthaei / Maximilian Pfisterer	Ice dance	Dissolved		
January 21, 2020	(Canada) Brooke McIntosh / Brandon Toste	Pairs	Dissolved	Toste retired.	
February 9, 2020	(Russia) Alisa Efimova / Alexander Korovin	Pairs	Dissolved		
February 12, 2020	(Russia) Ksenia Stolbova / Andrei Novoselov	Pairs	Dissolved	Stolbova retired.	
February 18, 2020	(Canada) Brooke McIntosh / Benjamin Mimar	Pairs	Formed		
February 26, 2020	(Australia) Ekaterina Alexandrovskaya / Harley Windsor	Pairs	Dissolved	Alexandrovskaya retired.	
February 26, 2020	(United States) Alexa Scimeca Knierim / Chris Knierim	Pairs	Dissolved	Chris Knierim retired.	
February 28, 2020	(Lithuania) Mira Polishook / Deividas Kizala	Ice dance	Dissolved	Polishook retired.	
March 1, 2020	(Russia) Sofia Evdokimova / Egor Bazin	Ice dance	Dissolved		
March 13, 2020	(Russia) Polina Kostiukovich / Dmitrii Ialin	Pairs	Dissolved		
March 13, 2020	(Italy) Jasmine Tessari / Francesco Fioretti	Ice dance	Dissolved		
March 13, 2020	(Italy) Carolina Moscheni / Francesco Fioretti	Ice dance	Formed		
March 13, 2020	(United Kingdom) Lydia Smart / Harry Mattick	Pairs	Formed		
March 13, 2020	(United Kingdom) Anastasia Vaipan-Law / Luke Digby	Pairs	Formed		
March 20, 2020	(Ukraine) Sofiia Nesterova / Artem Darenskyi	Pairs	Dissolved	Nesterova retired.	
March 25, 2020	(United States) Haven Denney / Brandon Frazier	Pairs	Dissolved		
March 30, 2020	(United States) Alexa Scimeca Knierim / Brandon Frazier	Pairs	Formed		
April 2, 2020	(Japan) Kiria Hirayama / Aru Tateno	Ice dance	Formed		
April 7, 2020	(Canada) Justine Brasseur / Mark Bardei	Pairs	Dissolved		
April 15, 2020	(Turkey) Nicole Kelly / Berk Akalın	Ice dance	Dissolved	Kelly retired.	
April 16, 2020	(Canada) Liubov Ilyushechkina / Charlie Bilodeau	Pairs	Dissolved	Bilodeau retired.	
April 16, 2020	(United States) Lorraine McNamara / Quinn Carpenter	Ice dance	Dissolved	Carpenter retired.	
May 15, 2020	(Russia) Elizaveta Khudaiberdieva / Andrey Filatov	Ice dance	Dissolved		
May 15, 2020	(Russia) Elizaveta Khudaiberdieva / Egor Bazin	Ice dance	Formed		
May 16, 2020	(Canada) Olivia McIsaac / Corey Circelli	Ice dance	Dissolved	McIsaac retired.	
May 28, 2020	(United States) Katie McBeath / Nathan Bartholomay	Pairs	Formed		
June 11, 2020	(Russia) Taisiya Sobinina / Nikita Volodin	Pairs	Dissolved		
June 11, 2020	(Russia) Viktoria Vasilieva / Nikita Volodin	Pairs	Formed		
June 17, 2020	(Ukraine) Sofiia Holichenko / Artem Darenskyi	Pairs	Formed		
June 24, 2020	(Czech Republic) Anna Dušková / Radek Jakubka	Pairs	Dissolved	Dušková retired.	
June 26, 2020	(Spain) Laura Barquero / Tòn Cónsul	Pairs	Dissolved		
June 29, 2020	(United States) Avonley Nguyen / Vadym Kolesnik	Ice dance	Dissolved		

=== Retirements ===
Date	Skater(s)	Disc.	Ref.
July 1, 2019	(Australia) Brooklee Han	Ladies	
July 8, 2019	(Russia) Ekaterina Bobrova	Ice dance	
July 18, 2019	(Slovakia) Silvia Hugec	Ladies	
July 29, 2019	(Russia) Alla Loboda	Ice dance	
August 1, 2019	(United States) Ashley Wagner	Ladies	
August 7, 2019	(United States) Gordon Green	Ice dance	
August 8, 2019	(Belgium) Jorik Hendrickx	Men	
August 17, 2019	(Belarus) Anna Kublikova	Ice dance	
August 22, 2019	(Russia) Anastasia Poluianova / Dmitry Sopot	Pairs	
September 17, 2019	(Canada) Tessa Virtue / Scott Moir	Ice dance	
September 25, 2019	(Russia) Anna Tarusina	Ladies	
October 15, 2019	(Russia) Amina Atakhanova	Pairs	
December 17, 2019	(Japan) Hiroaki Sato	Men	
December 31, 2019	(Japan) Chris Reed	Ice dance	
January 28, 2020	(Russia) Alena Kanysheva	Ladies	
February 12, 2020	(Russia) Ksenia Stolbova	Pairs	
February 14, 2020	(Russia) Betina Popova / Sergey Mozgov	Ice dance	
February 18, 2020	(Canada) Mathieu Ostiguy	Pairs	
February 26, 2020	(Australia) Ekaterina Alexandrovskaya	Pairs	
February 26, 2020	(United States) Chris Knierim	Pairs	
February 26, 2020	(Russia) Natalia Zabiiako / Alexander Enbert	Pairs	
March 1, 2020	(Russia) Adelina Sotnikova	Ladies	
March 20, 2020	(Ukraine) Sofiia Nesterova	Pairs	
April 16, 2020	(Canada) Charlie Bilodeau	Pairs	
April 16, 2020	(United States) Quinn Carpenter	Ice dance	
May 16, 2020	(Japan) Shu Nakamura	Men	
May 16, 2020	(Canada) Olivia McIsaac	Ice dance	
June 22, 2020	(Belarus) Yakau Zenko	Men	
June 24, 2020	(Czech Republic) Anna Dušková	Pairs	

=== Coaching changes ===
Date	Skater(s)	Disc.	From	To	Ref.
July 15, 2019	(Japan) Shoma Uno	Men	Machiko Yamada & Mihoko Higuchi	Takeshi Honda	
July 15, 2019	(Japan) Marin Honda	Ladies	Rafael Arutyunyan	Rafael Arutyunyan & Takeshi Honda	
July 16, 2019	(Ukraine) Oleksandra Nazarova / Maxim Nikitin	Ice dance	Igor Shpilband & Fabian Bourzat	Alexander Zhulin, Galina Churilova & Petr Durnev	
July 17, 2019	(Russia) Anastasia Gubanova	Ladies	Elena Buianova	Evgeni Rukavicin	
July 21, 2019	(Canada) Alicia Fabbri / Paul Ayer	Ice dance	Julien Lalonde	Marie-France Dubreuil, Patrice Lauzon & Romain Haguenauer	
July 22, 2019	(Russia) Elizaveta Nugumanova	Ladies	Angelina Turenko	Evgeni Rukavicin	
July 27, 2019	(Japan) Tomoe Kawabata	Ladies	Nakako Tsuzuki & Shoichiro Tsuzuki	Yukina Ota & Yutaka Higuchi	
July 30, 2019	(United States) Courtney Hicks	Ladies	Kori Ade	Christy Krall	
September 12, 2019	(South Korea) Lim Eun-soo	Ladies	Rafael Arutyunyan, Nadezda Kanaeva & Vera Arutyunyan	Chi Hyun-jung	
September 18, 2019	(Japan) Satoko Miyahara	Ladies	Mie Hamada, Yamato Tamura, Cathy Reed & Haruko Okamoto	Lee Barkell & Mie Hamada	
October 16, 2019	(South Korea) Kim Ye-lim	Ladies	Lee Kyu-hyun	Shin Hea-sook & Lee Eun-hee	
October 16, 2019	(South Korea) You Young	Ladies	Tom Zakrajsek	Tammy Gambill & Mie Hamada	
December 11, 2019	(United States) Gracie Gold	Ladies	Vincent Restencourt	Alex Zahradnicek & Pasha Filchenkov	
December 18, 2019	(Japan) Shoma Uno	Men	Takeshi Honda	Stéphane Lambiel	
January 2, 2020	(United States) Vincent Zhou	Men	Tammy Gambill, Christy Krall, Tom Zakrajsek & Mie Hamada	Lee Barkell, Lori Nichol & Mie Hamada	
February 4, 2020	(Chinese Taipei) Amy Lin	Ladies	Rafael Arutyunyan, Nadezda Kanaeva & Vera Arutyunyan	Namhoon Ryu	
February 7, 2020	(Australia) Brendan Kerry	Men	Nikolai Morozov	Elena Buianova, Maxim Zavozin & Alexander Uspenski	
February 11, 2020	(Russia) Stanislava Konstantinova	Ladies	Valentina Chebotareva	Alexander Volkov & Evgeni Plushenko	
February 25, 2020	(Japan) Miyu Honda	Ladies	Mie Hamada & Yamato Tamura	Takeshi Honda	
March 3, 2020	(China) Zhu Yi	Ladies	Derrick Delmore, Ivan Dinev, Brian Orser & Angela Nikodinov	Brian Orser, Oula Jääskeläinen & Derrick Delmore	
March 16, 2020	(Russia) Anastasia Mishina / Aleksandr Galiamov	Pairs	Ludmila Velikova, Nikolai Velikov & Vasilii Velikov	Tamara Moskvina	
April 16, 2020	(Canada) Carolane Soucisse / Shane Firus	Ice dance	Marie-France Dubreuil, Patrice Lauzon & Romain Haguenauer	Carol Lane, Jon Lane & Juris Razgulajevs	
May 6, 2020	(Russia) Alexandra Trusova	Ladies	Eteri Tutberidze, Sergei Dudakov & Daniil Gleikhengauz	Evgeni Plushenko & Dmitri Mikhailov	
May 21, 2020	(Russia) Anastasia Shpilevaya / Grigory Smirnov	Ice dance	Alexander Svinin & Irina Zhuk	Denis Samokhin	
June 1, 2020	(France) Adam Siao Him Fa	Men	Brian Joubert	Laurent Depouilly	
June 8, 2020	(Russia) Alena Kanysheva	Ice dance	Eteri Tutberidze, Sergei Dudakov & Daniil Gleikhengauz	Nikita Nazarov & Denis Samokhin	
June 10, 2020	(United States) Jimmy Ma	Men	Peter Cain, Darlene Cain & Nikolai Morozov	Olga Ganicheva & Aleksey Letov	
June 13, 2020	(Japan) Rika Kihira	Ladies	Mie Hamada, Yamato Tamura, Cathy Reed & Haruko Okamoto	Brian Orser & Mie Hamada	
June 22, 2020	(United States) Alysa Liu	Ladies	Laura Lipetsky	Lee Barkell, Lori Nichol & Massimo Scali	
June 24, 2020	(Switzerland) Alexia Paganini	Ladies	Igor Krokavec	Stéphane Lambiel	
June 26, 2020	(Russia) Mikhail Kolyada	Men	Valentina Chebotareva	Alexei Mishin	

=== Nationality changes ===
Date	Skater(s)	Disc.	From	To	Notes	Ref.
July 9, 2019	Emmy Ma	Ladies	United States	Chinese Taipei		
August 3, 2019	Ioulia Chtchetinina	Pairs	Switzerland	Hungary	Partnering with Márk Magyar	
August 9, 2019	Konstantin Milyukov	Men	Russia	Belarus		
August 9, 2019	Viktoriia Safonova	Ladies	Russia	Belarus		
August 9, 2019	Viktoria Yatsenko / Daniil Parkman	Pairs	Russia	Belarus		
August 15, 2019	Deanna Stellato-Dudek	Pairs	United States	Canada	Partnering with Maxime Deschamps	
September 1, 2019	Yaroslav Paniot	Men	Ukraine	United States		
September 14, 2019	Ashley Lin	Ladies	United States	China	Competes using name Lin Shan (林姗)	
November 10, 2019	Larry Loupolover	Men	Azerbaijan	Bulgaria		
December 14, 2019	Jari Kessler	Men	Italy	Croatia		
December 15, 2019	Viktoria Semenjuk	Ice dance	Estonia	Belarus	Partnering with Ilya Yukhimuk	
May 7, 2020	Daisuke Murakami	Men	Japan	United States		
June 22, 2020	Bogdana Lukashevich / Alexander Stepanov	Pairs	Russia	Belarus		

== International competitions ==
Code key

- S – Senior event
- J – Junior event
- N – Novice event
- M – Men's singles
- L – Ladies' singles
- P – Pair skating
- D – Ice dance

Color key

- Youth Olympics
- ISU Championships
- Grand Prix or Junior Grand Prix
- Challenger Series
- Other competition

2019
Dates	Event	Type	Level	Disc.	Location	Results
July 30 – August 2	Lake Placid Ice Dance International	Other	S/J	D	Lake Placid, New York, United States	Details 12
July 31 – August 3	Philadelphia Summer International	Other	S/J	M/L	Philadelphia, Pennsylvania, United States	Details
August 9–13	Tayside Trophy	Other	S/J	M/L	Dundee, Scotland, United Kingdom	Details
August 10–11	NRW Summer Trophy	Other	All	M/L/D	Dortmund, Germany	Details
August 21–24	JGP France	Grand Prix	Junior	M/L/D	Courchevel, France	Details
August 28–31	JGP United States	Grand Prix	Junior	All	Lake Placid, New York, United States	Details
September 4–7	JGP Latvia	Grand Prix	Junior	M/L/D	Riga, Latvia	Details
September 11–14	JGP Russia	Grand Prix	Junior	All	Chelyabinsk, Russia	Details
September 12–14	Autumn Classic International	Challenger	Senior	M/L/D	Oakville, Ontario, Canada	Details
September 13–15	Lombardia Trophy	Challenger	Senior	M/L/D	Bergamo, Italy	Details
September 17–22	U.S. International Classic	Challenger	Senior	All	Salt Lake City, Utah, United States	Details
September 18–21	JGP Poland	Grand Prix	Junior	All	Gdańsk, Poland	Details
September 19–21	Nepela Memorial	Challenger	Senior	M/L/D	Bratislava, Slovakia	Details
September 19–22	Black Sea Ice Cup Kranevo	Other	J/N	M/L	Kranevo, Bulgaria	Details
September 25–28	Nebelhorn Trophy	Challenger	Senior	All	Oberstdorf, Germany	Details
September 25–28	JGP Croatia	Grand Prix	Junior	All	Zagreb, Croatia	Details
October 2–5	JGP Italy	Grand Prix	Junior	M/L/D	Egna, Italy	Details
October 3–5	Shanghai Trophy	Other	Senior	All	Shanghai, China	Details
October 5	Japan Open	Other	Senior	M/L	Saitama, Japan	Details
October 5–6	Mezzaluna Cup	Other	All	D	Mentana, Italy	Details
October 10–13	Denis Ten Memorial Challenge	Other	Senior	All	Almaty, Kazakhstan	Details
October 10–13	Denis Ten Memorial Challenge	Other	Junior	M/L	Almaty, Kazakhstan	Details
October 11–13	Finlandia Trophy	Challenger	Senior	All	Espoo, Finland	Details
October 15–17	Ice Star	Other	J/N	All	Minsk, Belarus	Details
October 17–20	Halloween Cup	Other	All	M/L/D	Budapest, Hungary	Details
October 18–20	Skate America	Grand Prix	Senior	All	Las Vegas, Nevada, United States	Details
October 18–20	Ice Star	Challenger	Senior	M/L/D	Minsk, Belarus	Details
October 23–27	Golden Bear of Zagreb	Other	All	All	Zagreb, Croatia	Details
October 25–27	Skate Canada International	Grand Prix	Senior	All	Kelowna, British Columbia, Canada	Details
October 30 – November 3	Asian Open Trophy	Challenger	Senior	M/L/D	Dongguan, China	Details
October 30 – November 3	Asian Open Trophy	Other	J/N	M/L	Dongguan, China	Details
October 31 – November 3	Tirnavia Ice Cup	Other	All	M/L	Trnava, Slovakia	Details
November 1–3	Internationaux de France	Grand Prix	Senior	All	Grenoble, France	Details
November 1–3	IceLab International Cup	Other	Senior	P	Bergamo, Italy	Details
November 1–3	IceLab International Cup	Other	J/N	M/L/P	Bergamo, Italy	Details
November 6–10	Volvo Open Cup	Other	All	All	Riga, Latvia	Details
November 8–10	Cup of China	Grand Prix	Senior	All	Chongqing, China	Details
November 8–10	Pavel Roman Memorial	Other	All	D	Olomouc, Czech Republic	Details
November 8–10	Prague Ice Cup	Other	All	M/L	Prague, Czech Republic	Details
November 10–17	Tallinn Trophy	Other	S/J	M/L	Tallinn, Estonia	Details
November 12–17	Denkova-Staviski Cup	Other	All	M/L	Sofia, Bulgaria	Details
November 14–17	Warsaw Cup	Challenger	Senior	All	Warsaw, Poland	Details
November 15–17	Rostelecom Cup	Grand Prix	Senior	All	Moscow, Russia	Details
November 20–24	Open d'Andorra	Other	All	M/L/D	Canillo, Andorra	Details
November 20–24	Skate Celje	Other	J/N	M/L	Celje, Slovenia	Details
November 22–24	NHK Trophy	Grand Prix	Senior	All	Sapporo, Japan	Details
November 25–30	Bosphorus Istanbul Cup	Other	All	M/L/D	Istanbul, Turkey	Details
November 30 – December 2	Southeast Asian Games	Other	Senior	M/L	Manila, Philippines	Details
December 2–8	Santa Claus Cup	Other	S/J	M/L/D	Budapest, Hungary	Details
December 4–7	Golden Spin of Zagreb	Challenger	Senior	All	Zagreb, Croatia	Details
December 5–8	Grand Prix Final	Grand Prix	S/J	All	Turin, Italy	Details
December 13–15	Grand Prix of Bratislava	Other	J/N	All	Bratislava, Slovakia	Details

2020
Dates	Event	Type	Level	Disc.	Location	Results
January 7–12	Mentor Toruń Cup	Other	All	M/L/D	Toruń, Poland	Details
January 8–12	EduSport Trophy	Other	All	M/L	Bucharest, Romania	Details
January 10–15	Winter Youth Olympics	Olympics	Junior	All	Lausanne, Switzerland	Details
January 14–18	Skate Helena	Other	Senior	L	Belgrade, Serbia	Details
January 14–18	Skate Helena	Other	J/N	M/L	Belgrade, Serbia	Details
January 20–26	European Championships	Championships	Senior	All	Graz, Austria	Details
January 24–26	Reykjavik International Games	Other	All	M/L	Reykjavík, Iceland	Details
January 30 – February 2	Dragon Trophy & Tivoli Cup	Other	All	M/L	Ljubljana, Slovenia	Details 1, 2
February 3–9	Bavarian Open	Other	All	All	Oberstdorf, Germany	Details
February 4–9	Four Continents Championships	Championships	Senior	All	Seoul, South Korea	Details
February 6–9	Nordic Championships	Other	All	M/L	Stavanger, Norway	Details
February 7–9	Egna Dance Trophy	Other	All	D	Egna, Italy	Details
February 12–18	Sofia Trophy	Other	All	M/L	Sofia, Bulgaria	Details
February 13–16	Tallink Hotels Cup	Other	S/J	M/L	Tallinn, Estonia	Details
February 14–16	Jégvirág Cup	Other	All	M/L/D	Miskolc, Hungary	Details
February 20–23	International Challenge Cup	Other	All	M/L/P	The Hague, Netherlands	Details
March 2–8	World Junior Championships	Championships	Junior	All	Tallinn, Estonia	Details

=== Cancelled events ===
All competitions following the World Junior Championships, including the World Championships in Montreal, Canada, were cancelled by either the ISU, the host federation, or the local governments due to the COVID-19 pandemic.

== International medalists ==
=== Men's singles ===
Championships
Competition	Gold	Silver	Bronze	Results
(Austria) European Championships	(Russia) Dmitri Aliev	(Russia) Artur Danielian	(Georgia (country)) Morisi Kvitelashvili	Details
(South Korea) Four Continents Championships	(Japan) Yuzuru Hanyu	(United States) Jason Brown	(Japan) Yuma Kagiyama	Details
(Estonia) World Junior Championships	(Russia) Andrei Mozalev	(Japan) Yuma Kagiyama	(Russia) Petr Gumennik	Details

Grand Prix
Competition	Gold	Silver	Bronze	Results
(United States) Skate America	(United States) Nathan Chen	(United States) Jason Brown	(Russia) Dmitri Aliev	Details
Skate Canada International	(Japan) Yuzuru Hanyu	(Canada) Nam Nguyen	(Japan) Keiji Tanaka	Details
Internationaux de France	(United States) Nathan Chen	(Russia) Alexander Samarin	(France) Kévin Aymoz	Details
Cup of China	(China) Jin Boyang	(China) Yan Han	(Italy) Matteo Rizzo	Details
(Russia) Rostelecom Cup	(Russia) Alexander Samarin	(Russia) Dmitri Aliev	(Russia) Makar Ignatov	Details
(Japan) NHK Trophy	(Japan) Yuzuru Hanyu	(France) Kévin Aymoz	(Canada) Roman Sadovsky	Details
(Italy) Grand Prix Final	(United States) Nathan Chen	(Japan) Yuzuru Hanyu	(France) Kévin Aymoz	Details

Junior Grand Prix
Competition	Gold	Silver	Bronze	Results
JGP France	(Japan) Yuma Kagiyama	(Canada) Aleksa Rakic	(Russia) Andrei Kutovoi	Details
JGP United States	(Japan) Shun Sato	(Canada) Stephen Gogolev	(Russia) Gleb Lutfullin	Details
JGP Latvia	(Russia) Andrei Mozalev	(South Korea) Lee Si-hyeong	(Russia) Daniil Samsonov	Details
JGP Russia	(Russia) Petr Gumennik	(Russia) Artur Danielian	(Russia) Ilya Yablokov	Details
JGP Poland	(Russia) Daniil Samsonov	(Japan) Yuma Kagiyama	(Italy) Daniel Grassl	Details
JGP Croatia	(Russia) Andrei Mozalev	(Russia) Artur Danielian	(Japan) Shun Sato	Details
JGP Italy	(Italy) Daniel Grassl	(Russia) Petr Gumennik	(Ukraine) Ivan Shmuratko	Details
(Italy) JGP Final	(Japan) Shun Sato	(Russia) Andrei Mozalev	(Russia) Daniil Samsonov	Details

Challenger Series
Competition	Gold	Silver	Bronze	Results
(Canada) Autumn Classic International	(Japan) Yuzuru Hanyu	(France) Kévin Aymoz	(Canada) Keegan Messing	Details
(Italy) Lombardia Trophy	(China) Jin Boyang	(Russia) Dmitri Aliev	(Italy) Matteo Rizzo	Details
(United States) U.S. International Classic	(Japan) Keiji Tanaka	(Japan) Sōta Yamamoto	(United States) Vincent Zhou	Details
(Slovenia) Nepela Memorial	(Russia) Dmitri Aliev	(Italy) Matteo Rizzo	(Latvia) Deniss Vasiļjevs	Details
(Germany) Nebelhorn Trophy	(Russia) Makar Ignatov	(Japan) Koshiro Shimada	(Israel) Alexei Bychenko	Details
(Finland) Finlandia Trophy	(Japan) Shoma Uno	(Japan) Sōta Yamamoto	(Canada) Roman Sadovsky	Details
(Belarus) Ice Star	(Italy) Daniel Grassl	(Russia) Artem Kovalev	(France) Adam Siao Him Fa	Details
(China) Asian Open Trophy	(Italy) Daniel Grassl	(United States) Andrew Torgashev	(United States) Ryan Dunk	Details
(Poland) Warsaw Cup	(Russia) Andrei Mozalev	(Russia) Petr Gumennik	(South Korea) Lee June-hyoung	Details
(Croatia) Golden Spin of Zagreb	(United States) Jason Brown	(Georgia (country)) Morisi Kvitelashvili	(Russia) Makar Ignatov	Details

Other international competitions
Competition	Gold	Silver	Bronze	Results
(United States) Philadelphia Summer International	(United States) Andrew Torgashev	(Mexico) Donovan Carrillo	(United States) Alexei Krasnozhon	Details
(United Kingdom) Tayside Trophy	(United Kingdom) Peter James Hallam	(United Kingdom) Graham Newberry	(United Kingdom) Harry Mattick	Details
(China) Shanghai Trophy	(Italy) Matteo Rizzo	(Russia) Alexander Samarin	(China) Jin Boyang	Details
(Kazakhstan) Denis Ten Memorial Challenge	(Georgia (country)) Morisi Kvitelashvili	(Russia) Makar Ignatov	(Estonia) Daniel Albert Naurits	Details
(Hungary) Halloween Cup	(Australia) Brendan Kerry	(Ukraine) Ivan Shmuratko	(Turkey) Burak Demirboğa	Details
(Croatia) Golden Bear of Zagreb	(Georgia (country)) Irakli Maysuradze	(Austria) Luc Maierhofer	(Switzerland) Lukas Britschgi	Details
(Slovenia) Tirnavia Ice Cup	(Switzerland) Nurullah Sahaka	(Switzerland) David Gouveia	(Slovakia) Marco Klepoch	Details
(Latvia) Volvo Open Cup	(Russia) Artem Kovalev	(Georgia (country)) Irakli Maysuradze	(Azerbaijan) Vladimir Litvintsev	Details
(Czech Republic) Prague Ice Cup	(Russia) Andrei Zuber	(Czech Republic) Jiří Bělohradský	(Switzerland) Nicola Todeschini	Details
(Estonia) Tallinn Trophy	(Estonia) Mihhail Selevko	(Estonia) Aleksandr Selevko	(Bulgaria) Nicky-Leo Obreykov	Details
(Bulgaria) Denkova-Staviski Cup	(Austria) Maurizio Zandron	(United Kingdom) Graham Newberry	(Italy) Mattia Dalla Torre	Details
Open d'Andorra	(Austria) Luc Maierhofer	(Germany) Thomas Stoll	(Switzerland) Tomás Guarino	Details
(Turkey) Bosphorus Istanbul Cup	(Russia) Mark Kondratiuk	(Turkey) Başar Oktar	(Austria) Maurizio Zandron	Details
(Philippines) Southeast Asian Games	(Malaysia) Julian Zhi Jie Yee	(Philippines) Christopher Caluza	(Thailand) Micah Kai Lynette	Details
(Hungary) Santa Claus Cup	(France) Luc Economides	(Austria) Maurizio Zandron	(France) Philip Warren	Details
(Poland) Mentor Toruń Cup	(Azerbaijan) Vladimir Litvintsev	(Russia) Mark Kondratiuk	(Australia) Brendan Kerry	Details
(Romania) EduSport Trophy	(Bulgaria) Larry Loupolover	(Hong Kong) Leung Kwun Hung	No other competitors	Details
(Switzerland) Winter Youth Olympics	(Japan) Yuma Kagiyama	(Russia) Andrei Mozalev	(Russia) Daniil Samsonov	Details
(Iceland) Reykjavik International Games	(Denmark) Nikolaj Mølgaard Pedersen	No other competitors		Details
(Slovenia) Dragon Trophy	(Switzerland) Nicola Todeschini	(Monaco) Davide Lewton Brain	(Switzerland) Nurullah Sahaka	Details
(Germany) Bavarian Open	(Japan) Shun Sato	(Sweden) Nikolaj Majorov	(Japan) Yuto Kishina	Details
(Norway) Nordic Championships	(Latvia) Deniss Vasiļjevs	(Norway) Sondre Oddvoll Bøe	(Sweden) Illya Solomin	Details
(Bulgaria) Sofia Trophy	(Bulgaria) Larry Loupolover	(Turkey) Burak Demirboğa	(Austria) Maurizio Zandron	Details
(Estonia) Tallink Hotels Cup	(Russia) Alexander Samarin	(Russia) Evgeni Semenenko	(Estonia) Aleksandr Selevko	Details
(Hungary) Jégvirág Cup	(Hungary) András Csernoch	(Hungary) Máté Böröcz	No other competitors	Details
(Netherlands) International Challenge Cup	(Japan) Shoma Uno	(Japan) Keiji Tanaka	(France) Adrien Tesson	Details

=== Ladies' singles ===
Championships
Competition	Gold	Silver	Bronze	Results
(Austria) European Championships	(Russia) Alena Kostornaia	(Russia) Anna Shcherbakova	(Russia) Alexandra Trusova	Details
(South Korea) Four Continents Championships	(Japan) Rika Kihira	(South Korea) You Young	(United States) Bradie Tennell	Details
(Estonia) World Junior Championships	(Russia) Kamila Valieva	(Russia) Daria Usacheva	(United States) Alysa Liu	Details

Grand Prix
Competition	Gold	Silver	Bronze	Results
(United States) Skate America	(Russia) Anna Shcherbakova	(United States) Bradie Tennell	(Russia) Elizaveta Tuktamysheva	Details
Skate Canada International	(Russia) Alexandra Trusova	(Japan) Rika Kihira	(South Korea) You Young	Details
Internationaux de France	(Russia) Alena Kostornaia	(Russia) Alina Zagitova	(United States) Mariah Bell	Details
Cup of China	(Russia) Anna Shcherbakova	(Japan) Satoko Miyahara	(Russia) Elizaveta Tuktamysheva	Details
(Russia) Rostelecom Cup	(Russia) Alexandra Trusova	(Russia) Evgenia Medvedeva	(United States) Mariah Bell	Details
(Japan) NHK Trophy	(Russia) Alena Kostornaia	(Japan) Rika Kihira	(Russia) Alina Zagitova	Details
(Italy) Grand Prix Final	(Russia) Alena Kostornaia	(Russia) Anna Shcherbakova	(Russia) Alexandra Trusova	Details

Junior Grand Prix
Competition	Gold	Silver	Bronze	Results
JGP France	(Russia) Kamila Valieva	(South Korea) Wi Seo-yeong	(Russia) Maya Khromykh	Details
JGP United States	(United States) Alysa Liu	(South Korea) Park Yeon-jeong	(Russia) Anastasia Tarakanova	Details
JGP Latvia	(South Korea) Lee Hae-in	(Russia) Daria Usacheva	(Japan) Rino Matsuike	Details
JGP Russia	(Russia) Kamila Valieva	(Russia) Kseniia Sinitsyna	(Russia) Viktoria Vasilieva	Details
JGP Poland	(United States) Alysa Liu	(Russia) Viktoria Vasilieva	(Russia) Anastasia Tarakanova	Details
JGP Croatia	(South Korea) Lee Hae-in	(Russia) Daria Usacheva	(Russia) Anna Frolova	Details
JGP Italy	(Russia) Kseniia Sinitsyna	(Russia) Anna Frolova	(Italy) Alessia Tornaghi	Details
(Italy) JGP Final	(Russia) Kamila Valieva	(United States) Alysa Liu	(Russia) Daria Usacheva	Details

Challenger Series
Competition	Gold	Silver	Bronze	Results
(Canada) Autumn Classic International	(Japan) Rika Kihira	(Russia) Evgenia Medvedeva	(South Korea) Lim Eun-soo	Details
(Italy) Lombardia Trophy	(Russia) Anna Shcherbakova	(Russia) Elizaveta Tuktamysheva	(South Korea) You Young	Details
(United States) U.S. International Classic	(Japan) Satoko Miyahara	(South Korea) You Young	(United States) Amber Glenn	Details
(Slovenia) Nepela Memorial	(Russia) Alexandra Trusova	(Japan) Kaori Sakamoto	(South Korea) Kim Ha-nul	Details
(Germany) Nebelhorn Trophy	(United States) Mariah Bell	(South Korea) Kim Ye-lim	(Germany) Nicole Schott	Details
(Finland) Finlandia Trophy	(Russia) Alena Kostornaia	(Russia) Elizaveta Tuktamysheva	(Japan) Yuhana Yokoi	Details
(Belarus) Ice Star	(Russia) Sofia Samodurova	(South Korea) Kim Ha-nul	(Azerbaijan) Ekaterina Ryabova	Details
(China) Asian Open Trophy	(South Korea) Lim Eun-soo	(South Korea) Kim Ha-nul	(United States) Gabriella Izzo	Details
(Poland) Warsaw Cup	(Poland) Ekaterina Kurakova	(United States) Bradie Tennell	(Russia) Elizaveta Nugumanova	Details
(Croatia) Golden Spin of Zagreb	(Russia) Elizaveta Tuktamysheva	(Belarus) Viktoriia Safonova	(Germany) Nicole Schott	Details

Other international competitions
Competition	Gold	Silver	Bronze	Results
(United States) Philadelphia Summer International	(South Korea) You Young	(United States) Karen Chen	(United States) Hanna Harrell	Details
(United Kingdom) Tayside Trophy	(United Kingdom) Natasha McKay	(United Kingdom) Karly Robertson	(Lithuania) Aleksandra Golovkina	Details
(China) Shanghai Trophy	(Russia) Evgenia Medvedeva	(Kazakhstan) Elizabet Tursynbaeva	(South Korea) Lim Eun-soo	Details
(Kazakhstan) Denis Ten Memorial Challenge	(Russia) Serafima Sakhanovich	(Russia) Anastasiia Guliakova	(Bulgaria) Alexandra Feigin	Details
(Hungary) Halloween Cup	(Italy) Lucrezia Beccari	(Hungary) Júlia Láng	(Finland) Linnea Ceder	Details
(Croatia) Golden Bear of Zagreb	(Italy) Alessia Tornaghi	(Austria) Olga Mikutina	(United Kingdom) Natasha McKay	Details
(Slovenia) Tirnavia Ice Cup	(Austria) Stefanie Pesendorfer	(Finland) Vera Stolt	(Switzerland) Shaline Rüegger	Details
(Latvia) Volvo Open Cup	(Belarus) Viktoriia Safonova	(Azerbaijan) Ekaterina Ryabova	(Georgia (country)) Alina Urushadze	Details
(Czech Republic) Prague Ice Cup	(Austria) Stefanie Pesendorfer	(Slovenia) Daša Grm	(Armenia) Anastasia Galustyan	Details
(Estonia) Tallinn Trophy	(Russia) Ksenia Tsibinova	(Russia) Anastasiia Guliakova	(Austria) Olga Mikutina	Details
(Bulgaria) Denkova-Staviski Cup	(Bulgaria) Alexandra Feigin	(United Kingdom) Natasha McKay	(Italy) Chenny Paolucci	Details
Open d'Andorra	(Netherlands) Kyarha van Tiel	(Poland) Elżbieta Gabryszak	(Switzerland) Yasmine Kimiko Yamada	Details
(Turkey) Bosphorus Istanbul Cup	(Austria) Olga Mikutina	(Georgia (country)) Alina Urushadze	(Turkey) Güzide Irmak Bayır	Details
(Philippines) Southeast Asian Games	(Singapore) Chloe Ing	(Philippines) Alisson Krystle Perticheto	(Indonesia) Savika Refa Zahira	Details
(Hungary) Santa Claus Cup	(Armenia) Anastasia Galustyan	(Hungary) Júlia Láng	(Austria) Sophia Schaller	Details
(Poland) Mentor Toruń Cup	(Poland) Ekaterina Kurakova	(United States) Emily Zhang	(Israel) Alina Iushchenkova	Details
(Romania) EduSport Trophy	(Italy) Lucrezia Beccari	(Bulgaria) Alexandra Feigin	(Switzerland) Yasmine Kimiko Yamada	Details
(Switzerland) Winter Youth Olympics	(South Korea) You Young	(Russia) Kseniia Sinitsyna	(Russia) Anna Frolova	Details
(Serbia) Europa Cup Skate Helena	(Bulgaria) Kristina Grigorova	(Hungary) Júlia Láng	(Lithuania) Elžbieta Kropa	Details
(Iceland) Reykjavik International Games	(Norway) Marianne Stålen	(Poland) Oliwia Rzepiel	(Norway) Louisa Warwin	Details
(Slovenia) Dragon Trophy	(Italy) Roberta Rodeghiero	(Italy) Lara Naki Gutmann	(Slovenia) Daša Grm	Details
(Germany) Bavarian Open	(Japan) Satoko Miyahara	(Japan) Marin Honda	(Netherlands) Niki Wories	Details
(Norway) Nordic Championships	(Italy) Lara Naki Gutmann	(Finland) Emmi Peltonen	(Finland) Jenni Saarinen	Details
(Bulgaria) Sofia Trophy	(Bulgaria) Alexandra Feigin	(Italy) Lucrezia Beccari	(Slovenia) Daša Grm	Details
(Estonia) Tallink Hotels Cup	(Russia) Anastasiia Guliakova	(Estonia) Eva-Lotta Kiibus	(Belarus) Viktoriia Safonova	Details
(Hungary) Jégvirág Cup	(Hungary) Júlia Láng	(Ukraine) Maryna Zhdanovych	(Czech Republic) Eliška Březinová	Details
(Netherlands) International Challenge Cup	(Japan) Rika Kihira	(Japan) Yuhana Yokoi	(Canada) Madeline Schizas	Details

=== Pairs ===
Championships
Competition	Gold	Silver	Bronze	Results
(Austria) European Championships	(Russia) Aleksandra Boikova / Dmitrii Kozlovskii	(Russia) Evgenia Tarasova / Vladimir Morozov	(Russia) Daria Pavliuchenko / Denis Khodykin	Details
(South Korea) Four Continents Championships	(China) Sui Wenjing / Han Cong	(China) Peng Cheng / Jin Yang	(Canada) Kirsten Moore-Towers / Michael Marinaro	Details
(Estonia) World Junior Championships	(Russia) Apollinariia Panfilova / Dmitry Rylov	(Russia) Kseniia Akhanteva / Valerii Kolesov	(Russia) Iuliia Artemeva / Mikhail Nazarychev	Details

Grand Prix
Competition	Gold	Silver	Bronze	Results
(United States) Skate America	(China) Peng Cheng / Jin Yang	(Russia) Daria Pavliuchenko / Denis Khodykin	(United States) Haven Denney / Brandon Frazier	Details
Skate Canada International	(Russia) Aleksandra Boikova / Dmitrii Kozlovskii	(Canada) Kirsten Moore-Towers / Michael Marinaro	(Russia) Evgenia Tarasova / Vladimir Morozov	Details
Internationaux de France	(Russia) Anastasia Mishina / Aleksandr Galliamov	(Russia) Daria Pavliuchenko / Denis Khodykin	(United States) Haven Denney / Brandon Frazier	Details
Cup of China	(China) Sui Wenjing / Han Cong	(China) Peng Cheng / Jin Yang	(Canada) Liubov Ilyushechkina / Charlie Bilodeau	Details
(Russia) Rostelecom Cup	(Russia) Aleksandra Boikova / Dmitrii Kozlovskii	(Russia) Evgenia Tarasova / Vladimir Morozov	(Germany) Minerva Fabienne Hase / Nolan Seegert	Details
(Japan) NHK Trophy	(China) Sui Wenjing / Han Cong	(Canada) Kirsten Moore-Towers / Michael Marinaro	(Russia) Anastasia Mishina / Aleksandr Galliamov	Details
(Italy) Grand Prix Final	(China) Sui Wenjing / Han Cong	(China) Peng Cheng / Jin Yang	(Russia) Anastasia Mishina / Aleksandr Galliamov	Details

Junior Grand Prix
Competition	Gold	Silver	Bronze	Results
JGP United States	(Russia) Apollinariia Panfilova / Dmitry Rylov	(Russia) Kseniia Akhanteva / Valerii Kolesov	(Russia) Alina Pepeleva / Roman Pleshkov	Details
JGP Russia	(Russia) Kseniia Akhanteva / Valerii Kolesov	(Russia) Iuliia Artemeva / Mikhail Nazarychev	(Russia) Diana Mukhametzianova / Ilya Mironov	Details
JGP Poland	(Russia) Apollinariia Panfilova / Dmitry Rylov	(United States) Kate Finster / Balazs Nagy	(Germany) Annika Hocke / Robert Kunkel	Details
JGP Croatia	(Russia) Iuliia Artemeva / Mikhail Nazarychev	(Russia) Diana Mukhametzianova / Ilya Mironov	(Germany) Annika Hocke / Robert Kunkel	Details
(Italy) JGP Final	(Russia) Apollinariia Panfilova / Dmitry Rylov	(Russia) Diana Mukhametzianova / Ilya Mironov	(Russia) Kseniia Akhanteva / Valerii Kolesov	Details

Challenger Series
Competition	Gold	Silver	Bronze	Results
(United States) U.S. International Classic	(United States) Ashley Cain-Gribble / Timothy LeDuc	(Russia) Evgenia Tarasova / Vladimir Morozov	(China) Peng Cheng / Jin Yang	Details
(Germany) Nebelhorn Trophy	(Canada) Kirsten Moore-Towers / Michael Marinaro	(United States) Alexa Scimeca Knierim / Chris Knierim	(North Korea) Ryom Tae-ok / Kim Ju-sik	Details
(Finland) Finlandia Trophy	(Russia) Anastasia Mishina / Aleksandr Galliamov	(Russia) Alisa Efimova / Alexander Korovin	(Canada) Liubov Ilyushechkina / Charlie Bilodeau	Details
(Poland) Warsaw Cup	(United States) Jessica Calalang / Brian Johnson	(Russia) Alina Pepeleva / Roman Pleshkov	(Canada) Justine Brasseur / Mark Bardei	Details
(Croatia) Golden Spin of Zagreb	(United States) Ashley Cain-Gribble / Timothy LeDuc	(United States) Tarah Kayne / Danny O'Shea	(Germany) Minerva Fabienne Hase / Nolan Seegert	Details

Other international competitions
Competition	Gold	Silver	Bronze	Results
(China) Shanghai Trophy	(China) Peng Cheng / Jin Yang	(Russia) Aleksandra Boikova / Dmitrii Kozlovskii	(China) Tang Feiyao / Yang Yongchao	Details
(Kazakhstan) Denis Ten Memorial Challenge	(Russia) Lina Kudriavtseva / Ilia Spiridonov	(Spain) Laura Barquero / Tòn Cónsul	(Spain) Dorota Broda / Pedro Betegón	Details
(Italy) IceLab International Cup	(Russia) Alina Pepeleva / Roman Pleshkov	(Italy) Nicole Della Monica / Matteo Guarise	(Spain) Laura Barquero / Tòn Cónsul	Details
(Latvia) Volvo Open Cup	(Italy) Rebecca Ghilardi / Filippo Ambrosini	(Russia) Karina Akopova / Maksim Shagalov	(Israel) Anna Vernikov / Evgeni Krasnapolski	Details
(Switzerland) Winter Youth Olympics	(Russia) Apollinariia Panfilova / Dmitry Rylov	(Russia) Diana Mukhametzianova / Ilya Mironov	(Georgia (country)) Alina Butaeva / Luka Berulava	Details
(Germany) Bavarian Open	(Russia) Anastasia Mishina / Aleksandr Galliamov	(Germany) Annika Hocke / Robert Kunkel	(Russia) Karina Akopova / Maksim Shagalov	Details
(Netherlands) International Challenge Cup	(Austria) Miriam Ziegler / Severin Kiefer	(United States) Audrey Lu / Misha Mitrofanov	(Italy) Rebecca Ghilardi / Filippo Ambrosini	

=== Ice dance ===
Championships
Competition	Gold	Silver	Bronze	Results
(Austria) European Championships	(Russia) Victoria Sinitsina / Nikita Katsalapov	(France) Gabriella Papadakis / Guillaume Cizeron	(Russia) Alexandra Stepanova / Ivan Bukin	Details
(South Korea) Four Continents Championships	(United States) Madison Chock / Evan Bates	(Canada) Piper Gilles / Paul Poirier	(United States) Madison Hubbell / Zachary Donohue	Details
(Estonia) World Junior Championships	(United States) Avonley Nguyen / Vadym Kolesnik	(Georgia (country)) Maria Kazakova / Georgy Reviya	(Russia) Elizaveta Shanaeva / Devid Naryzhnyy	Details

Grand Prix
Competition	Gold	Silver	Bronze	Results
(United States) Skate America	(United States) Madison Hubbell / Zachary Donohue	(Russia) Alexandra Stepanova / Ivan Bukin	(Canada) Laurence Fournier Beaudry / Nikolaj Sørensen	Details
Skate Canada International	(Canada) Piper Gilles / Paul Poirier	(United States) Madison Hubbell / Zachary Donohue	(United Kingdom) Lilah Fear / Lewis Gibson	Details
Internationaux de France	(France) Gabriella Papadakis / Guillaume Cizeron	(United States) Madison Chock / Evan Bates	(Italy) Charlène Guignard / Marco Fabbri	Details
Cup of China	(Russia) Victoria Sinitsina / Nikita Katsalapov	(United States) Madison Chock / Evan Bates	(Canada) Laurence Fournier Beaudry / Nikolaj Sørensen	Details
(Russia) Rostelecom Cup	(Russia) Victoria Sinitsina / Nikita Katsalapov	(Canada) Piper Gilles / Paul Poirier	(Spain) Sara Hurtado / Kirill Khaliavin	Details
(Japan) NHK Trophy	(France) Gabriella Papadakis / Guillaume Cizeron	(Russia) Alexandra Stepanova / Ivan Bukin	(Italy) Charlène Guignard / Marco Fabbri	Details
(Italy) Grand Prix Final	(France) Gabriella Papadakis / Guillaume Cizeron	(United States) Madison Chock / Evan Bates	(United States) Madison Hubbell / Zachary Donohue	Details

Junior Grand Prix
Competition	Gold	Silver	Bronze	Results
JGP France	(Russia) Elizaveta Shanaeva / Devid Naryzhnyy	(France) Loïcia Demougeot / Théo Le Mercier	(Russia) Ekaterina Katashinskaia / Aleksandr Vaskovich	Details
JGP United States	(United States) Avonley Nguyen / Vadym Kolesnik	(Russia) Diana Davis / Gleb Smolkin	(Czech Republic) Natálie Taschlerová / Filip Taschler	Details
JGP Latvia	(Russia) Elizaveta Khudaiberdieva / Andrey Filatov	(Georgia (country)) Maria Kazakova / Georgy Reviya	(Russia) Sofya Tyutyunina / Alexander Shustitskiy	Details
JGP Russia	(Russia) Elizaveta Shanaeva / Devid Naryzhnyy	(Russia) Diana Davis / Gleb Smolkin	(Canada) Nadiia Bashynska / Peter Beaumont	Details
JGP Poland	(United States) Avonley Nguyen / Vadym Kolesnik	(France) Loïcia Demougeot / Théo Le Mercier	(Russia) Ekaterina Katashinskaia / Aleksandr Vaskovich	Details
JGP Croatia	(Georgia (country)) Maria Kazakova / Georgy Reviya	(Russia) Sofya Tyutyunina / Alexander Shustitskiy	(Canada) Emmy Bronsard / Aissa Bouaraguia	Details
JGP Italy	(Russia) Elizaveta Khudaiberdieva / Andrey Filatov	(Canada) Natalie D'Alessandro / Bruce Waddell	(Russia) Angelina Lazareva / Maksim Prokofiev	Details
(Italy) JGP Final	(Georgia (country)) Maria Kazakova / Georgy Reviya	(United States) Avonley Nguyen / Vadym Kolesnik	(Russia) Elizaveta Shanaeva / Devid Naryzhnyy	Details

Challenger Series
Competition	Gold	Silver	Bronze	Results
(Canada) Autumn Classic International	(Canada) Piper Gilles / Paul Poirier	(United Kingdom) Lilah Fear / Lewis Gibson	(France) Marie-Jade Lauriault / Romain Le Gac	Details
(Italy) Lombardia Trophy	(Italy) Charlène Guignard / Marco Fabbri	(Canada) Laurence Fournier Beaudry / Nikolaj Sørensen	(Ukraine) Oleksandra Nazarova / Maxim Nikitin	Details
(United States) U.S. International Classic	(United States) Madison Chock / Evan Bates	(United States) Christina Carreira / Anthony Ponomarenko	(Canada) Carolane Soucisse / Shane Firus	Details
(Slovenia) Nepela Memorial	(Russia) Victoria Sinitsina / Nikita Katsalapov	(Spain) Sara Hurtado / Kirill Khaliavin	(United States) Lorraine McNamara / Quinn Carpenter	Details
(Germany) Nebelhorn Trophy	(Canada) Laurence Fournier Beaudry / Nikolaj Sørensen	(United States) Kaitlin Hawayek / Jean-Luc Baker	(United States) Christina Carreira / Anthony Ponomarenko	Details
(Finland) Finlandia Trophy	(United States) Madison Chock / Evan Bates	(China) Wang Shiyue / Liu Xinyu	(Russia) Betina Popova / Sergey Mozgov	Details
(Belarus) Ice Star	(Spain) Sara Hurtado / Kirill Khaliavin	(Poland) Natalia Kaliszek / Maksym Spodyriev	(Ukraine) Oleksandra Nazarova / Maxim Nikitin	Details
(China) Asian Open Trophy	(United States) Christina Carreira / Anthony Ponomarenko	(Russia) Ksenia Konkina / Pavel Drozd	(Georgia (country)) Maria Kazakova / Georgy Reviya	Details
(Poland) Warsaw Cup	(France) Marie-Jade Lauriault / Romain Le Gac	(Russia) Ksenia Konkina / Pavel Drozd	(United States) Caroline Green / Michael Parsons	Details
(Croatia) Golden Spin of Zagreb	(Italy) Charlène Guignard / Marco Fabbri	(Russia) Annabelle Morozov / Andrei Bagin	(United States) Caroline Green / Michael Parsons	Details

Other international competitions
Competition	Gold	Silver	Bronze	Results
(United States) Lake Placid Ice Dance International	(Spain) Olivia Smart / Adrián Díaz	(United States) Christina Carreira / Anthony Ponomarenko	(United States) Lorraine McNamara / Quinn Carpenter	Details
(Germany) NRW Summer Trophy	(Russia) Ksenia Konkina / Pavel Drozd	(Ukraine) Darya Popova / Volodymyr Byelikov	(Bulgaria) Mina Zdravkova / Christopher M. Davis	Details
(China) Shanghai Trophy	(Russia) Victoria Sinitsina / Nikita Katsalapov	(United Kingdom) Lilah Fear / Lewis Gibson	(Poland) Natalia Kaliszek / Maksym Spodyriev	Details
(Italy) Mezzaluna Cup	(Ukraine) Oleksandra Nazarova / Maxim Nikitin	(France) Adelina Galyavieva / Louis Thauron	(Italy) Jasmine Tessari / Francesco Fioretti	Details
(Kazakhstan) Denis Ten Memorial Challenge	(Germany) Katharina Müller / Tim Dieck	(France) Adelina Galyavieva / Louis Thauron	(Kazakhstan) Maxime Weatherby / Temirlan Yerzhanov	Details
(Hungary) Halloween Cup	(Italy) Jasmine Tessari / Francesco Fioretti	(Germany) Shari Koch / Christian Nüchtern	(Hungary) Emily Monaghan / Iliaśz Fourati	Details
(Latvia) Volvo Open Cup	(Russia) Sofia Shevchenko / Igor Eremenko	(Georgia (country)) Maria Kazakova / Georgy Reviya	(Finland) Yuka Orihara / Juho Pirinen	Details
(Czech Republic) Pavel Roman Memorial	(Ukraine) Oleksandra Nazarova / Maxim Nikitin	(Poland) Justyna Plutowska / Jérémie Flemin	(Germany) Amanda Peterson / Maximilian Pfisterer	Details
Open d'Andorra	(Germany) Katharina Müller / Tim Dieck	(Czech Republic) Natálie Taschlerová / Filip Taschler	(France) Natacha Lagouge / Arnaud Caffa	Details
(Turkey) Bosphorus Istanbul Cup	(Poland) Natalia Kaliszek / Maksym Spodyriev	(Ukraine) Oleksandra Nazarova / Maxim Nikitin	(Russia) Sofia Evdokimova / Egor Bazin	Details
(Hungary) Santa Claus Cup	(Russia) Anastasia Skoptsova / Kirill Aleshin	(Armenia) Tina Garabedian / Simon Proulx-Sénécal	(Finland) Yuka Orihara / Juho Pirinen	Details
(Poland) Mentor Toruń Cup	(Poland) Natalia Kaliszek / Maksym Spodyriev	(China) Wang Shiyue / Liu Xinyu	(Armenia) Tina Garabedian / Simon Proulx-Sénécal	Details
(Switzerland) Winter Youth Olympics	(Russia) Irina Khavronina / Dario Cirisano	(Russia) Sofya Tyutyunina / Alexander Shustitskiy	(United States) Katarina Wolfkostin / Jeffrey Chen	Details
(Germany) Bavarian Open	(Lithuania) Allison Reed / Saulius Ambrulevičius	(France) Marie-Jade Lauriault / Romain Le Gac	(Canada) Haley Sales / Nikolas Wamsteeker	Details
(Italy) Egna Dance Trophy	(Finland) Juulia Turkkila / Matthias Versluis	(Russia) Anastasia Skoptsova / Kirill Aleshin	(France) Adelina Galyavieva / Louis Thauron	Details
(Hungary) Jégvirág Cup	(Israel) Shira Ichilov / Laurent Abecassis	(Bulgaria) Mina Zdravkova / Christopher M. Davis	(Latvia) Aurelija Ipolito / J.T. Michel	Details

== Season's best scores ==
=== Men's singles ===
Top 10 season's best scores in the men's combined total
No.	Skater	Nation	Score	Event
1	Nathan Chen	United States	335.30	2019–20 Grand Prix Final
2	Yuzuru Hanyu	Japan	322.59	2019 Skate Canada International
3	Kévin Aymoz	France	275.63	2019–20 Grand Prix Final
4	Jason Brown	United States	274.82	2020 Four Continents Championships
5	Dmitri Aliev	Russia	272.89	2020 European Championships
6	Yuma Kagiyama	Japan	270.61	2020 Four Continents Championships
7	Jin Boyang	China	268.31	2019 Lombardia Trophy
8	Cha Jun-hwan	South Korea	265.43	2020 Four Continents Championships
9	Alexander Samarin	Russia	265.10	2019 Internationaux de France
10	Nam Nguyen	Canada	262.77	2019 Skate Canada International

Top 10 season's best scores in the men's short program
No.	Skater	Nation	Score	Event
1	Yuzuru Hanyu	Japan	111.82	2020 Four Continents Championships
2	Nathan Chen	United States	110.38	2019–20 Grand Prix Final
3	Dmitri Aliev	Russia	101.49	2019 Nepela Memorial
4	Jin Boyang	China	101.09	2019 Lombardia Trophy
5	Alexander Samarin	Russia	98.48	2019 Internationaux de France
6	Kévin Aymoz	France	96.71	2019–20 Grand Prix Final
7	Keegan Messing	Canada	96.34	2019 Skate America
8	Jason Brown	United States	94.71	2020 Four Continents Championships
9	Sōta Yamamoto	Japan	92.81	2019 Finlandia Trophy
10	Shoma Uno	Japan	92.28	2019 Finlandia Trophy

Top 10 season's best scores in the men's free skating
No.	Skater	Nation	Score	Event
1	Nathan Chen	United States	224.92	2019–20 Grand Prix Final
2	Yuzuru Hanyu	Japan	212.99	2019 Skate Canada International
3	Dmitri Aliev	Russia	184.44	2020 European Championships
4	Jason Brown	United States	180.11	2020 Four Continents Championships
5	Yuma Kagiyama	Japan	179.00	2020 Four Continents Championships
6	Kévin Aymoz	France	178.92	2019–20 Grand Prix Final
7	Nam Nguyen	Canada	178.69	2019 Skate Canada International
8	Shun Sato	Japan	177.86	2019–20 JGP Final
9	Jin Boyang	China	176.10	2019 Cup of China
10	Cha Jun-hwan	South Korea	175.06	2020 Four Continents Championships

=== Ladies' singles ===
Top 10 season's best scores in the ladies' combined total
No.	Skater	Nation	Score	Event
1	Alena Kostornaia	Russia	247.59	2019–20 Grand Prix Final
2	Alexandra Trusova	Russia	241.02	2019 Skate Canada International
3	Anna Shcherbakova	Russia	240.92	2019–20 Grand Prix Final
4	Rika Kihira	Japan	232.34	2020 Four Continents Championships
5	Kamila Valieva	Russia	227.30	2020 World Junior Championships
6	Evgenia Medvedeva	Russia	225.76	2019 Rostelecom Cup
7	You Young	South Korea	223.23	2020 Four Continents Championships
8	Bradie Tennell	United States	222.97	2020 Four Continents Championships
9	Elizaveta Tuktamysheva	Russia	221.15	2019 Golden Spin of Zagreb
10	Alina Zagitova	Russia	217.99	2019 NHK Trophy

Top 10 season's best scores in the ladies' short program
No.	Skater	Nation	Score	Event
1	Alena Kostornaia	Russia	85.45	2019–20 Grand Prix Final
2	Rika Kihira	Japan	81.35	2019 Skate Canada International
3	Alina Zagitova	Russia	79.60	2019–20 Grand Prix Final
4	Anna Shcherbakova	Russia	78.27	2019–20 Grand Prix Final
5	You Young	South Korea	78.22	2019 Skate Canada International
6	Evgenia Medvedeva	Russia	76.93	2019 Rostelecom Cup
7	Bradie Tennell	United States	75.93	2020 Four Continents Championships
8	Alexandra Trusova	Russia	74.95	2020 European Championships
9	Kamila Valieva	Russia	74.92	2020 World Junior Championships
10	Kseniia Sinitsyna	Russia	74.65	2019 JGP Italy

Top 10 season's best scores in the ladies' free skating
No.	Skater	Nation	Score	Event
1	Alexandra Trusova	Russia	166.62	2019 Skate Canada International
2	Anna Shcherbakova	Russia	162.65	2019–20 Grand Prix Final
3	Alena Kostornaia	Russia	162.14	2019–20 Grand Prix Final
4	Kamila Valieva	Russia	152.38	2020 World Junior Championships
5	Rika Kihira	Japan	151.95	2019 NHK Trophy
6	Alina Zagitova	Russia	151.15	2019 NHK Trophy
7	You Young	South Korea	149.68	2020 Four Continents Championships
8	Evgenia Medvedeva	Russia	148.83	2019 Rostelecom Cup
9	Elizaveta Tuktamysheva	Russia	148.29	2019 Golden Spin of Zagreb
10	Bradie Tennell	United States	147.04	2020 Four Continents Championships

=== Pairs ===
Top 10 season's best scores in the pairs' combined total
No.	Team	Nation	Score	Event
1	Aleksandra Boikova / Dmitrii Kozlovskii	Russia	234.58	2020 European Championships
2	Sui Wenjing / Han Cong	China	228.37	2019 Cup of China
3	Evgenia Tarasova / Vladimir Morozov	Russia	216.77	2019 Rostelecom Cup
4	Peng Cheng / Jin Yang	China	213.29	2020 Four Continents Championships
5	Kirsten Moore-Towers / Michael Marinaro	Canada	210.35	2019 Nebelhorn Trophy
6	Anastasia Mishina / Aleksandr Galliamov	Russia	210.18	2019 Finlandia Trophy
7	Daria Pavliuchenko / Denis Khodykin	Russia	206.56	2019 Internationaux de France
8	Ashley Cain-Gribble / Timothy LeDuc	United States	205.58	2019 U.S. International Classic
9	Alexa Scimeca Knierim / Chris Knierim	United States	202.41	2019 Nebelhorn Trophy
10	Haven Denney / Brandon Frazier	United States	199.40	2019 Internationaux de France

Top 10 season's best scores in the pairs' short program
No.	Team	Nation	Score	Event
1	Aleksandra Boikova / Dmitrii Kozlovskii	Russia	82.34	2020 European Championships
2	Sui Wenjing / Han Cong	China	81.27	2019 NHK Trophy
3	Evgenia Tarasova / Vladimir Morozov	Russia	76.81	2019 Rostelecom Cup
4	Daria Pavliuchenko / Denis Khodykin	Russia	76.59	2019 Internationaux de France
5	Kirsten Moore-Towers / Michael Marinaro	Canada	76.36	2020 Four Continents Championships
6	Ashley Cain-Gribble / Timothy LeDuc	United States	76.23	2019 U.S. International Classic
7	Peng Cheng / Jin Yang	China	75.96	2020 Four Continents Championships
8	Anastasia Mishina / Aleksandr Galliamov	Russia	74.99	2019 Finlandia Trophy
9	Apollinariia Panfilova / Dmitry Rylov	Russia	73.71	2020 World Junior Championships
10	Alexa Scimeca Knierim / Chris Knierim	United States	71.28	2019 Skate Canada International

Top 10 season's best scores in the pairs' free skating
No.	Team	Nation	Score	Event
1	Aleksandra Boikova / Dmitrii Kozlovskii	Russia	152.24	2020 European Championships
2	Sui Wenjing / Han Cong	China	147.47	2019 Cup of China
3	Evgenia Tarasova / Vladimir Morozov	Russia	139.96	2019 Rostelecom Cup
4	Kirsten Moore-Towers / Michael Marinaro	Canada	138.59	2019 Nebelhorn Trophy
5	Peng Cheng / Jin Yang	China	137.33	2020 Four Continents Championships
6	Anastasia Mishina / Aleksandr Galliamov	Russia	135.19	2019 Finlandia Trophy
7	Daria Pavliuchenko / Denis Khodykin	Russia	131.61	2020 European Championships
8	Alexa Scimeca Knierim / Chris Knierim	United States	131.58	2019 Nebelhorn Trophy
9	Haven Denney / Brandon Frazier	United States	130.75	2019 Internationaux de France
10	Ashley Cain-Gribble / Timothy LeDuc	United States	129.66	2019 Internationaux de France

=== Ice dance ===
Top 10 season's best scores in the combined total (ice dance)
No.	Team	Nation	Score	Event
1	Gabriella Papadakis / Guillaume Cizeron	France	226.61	2019 NHK Trophy
2	Victoria Sinitsina / Nikita Katsalapov	Russia	220.42	2020 European Championships
3	Madison Chock / Evan Bates	United States	213.18	2020 Four Continents Championships
4	Alexandra Stepanova / Ivan Bukin	Russia	211.29	2020 European Championships
5	Piper Gilles / Paul Poirier	Canada	210.18	2020 Four Continents Championships
6	Madison Hubbell / Zachary Donohue	United States	209.55	2019 Skate America
7	Charlène Guignard / Marco Fabbri	Italy	205.58	2020 European Championships
8	Laurence Fournier Beaudry / Nikolaj Sørensen	Canada	201.00	2019 Nebelhorn Trophy
9	Wang Shiyue / Liu Xinyu	China	196.75	2020 Four Continents Championships
10	Lilah Fear / Lewis Gibson	Great Britain	195.35	2019 Skate Canada International

Top 10 season's best scores in the rhythm dance
No.	Team	Nation	Score	Event
1	Gabriella Papadakis / Guillaume Cizeron	France	90.03	2019 NHK Trophy
2	Victoria Sinitsina / Nikita Katsalapov	Russia	88.73	2020 European Championships
3	Madison Hubbell / Zachary Donohue	United States	85.95	2020 Four Continents Championships
4	Madison Chock / Evan Bates	United States	85.76	2020 Four Continents Championships
5	Charlène Guignard / Marco Fabbri	Italy	84.66	2020 European Championships
6	Alexandra Stepanova / Ivan Bukin	Russia	84.07	2019 NHK Trophy
7	Piper Gilles / Paul Poirier	Canada	83.92	2020 Four Continents Championships
8	Laurence Fournier Beaudry / Nikolaj Sørensen	Canada	81.16	2019 Nebelhorn Trophy
9	Kaitlin Hawayek / Jean-Luc Baker	United States	79.52	2019 Skate Canada International
10	Annabelle Morozov / Andrei Bagin	Russia	78.75	2019 Golden Spin of Zagreb

Top 10 season's best scores in the free dance
No.	Team	Nation	Score	Event
1	Gabriella Papadakis / Guillaume Cizeron	France	136.58	2019 NHK Trophy
2	Victoria Sinitsina / Nikita Katsalapov	Russia	131.69	2020 European Championships
3	Madison Chock / Evan Bates	United States	129.01	2019–20 Grand Prix Final
4	Alexandra Stepanova / Ivan Bukin	Russia	127.64	2020 European Championships
5	Piper Gilles / Paul Poirier	Canada	126.43	2019 Skate Canada International
6	Madison Hubbell / Zachary Donohue	United States	125.21	2019–20 Grand Prix Final
7	Charlène Guignard / Marco Fabbri	Italy	123.69	2019 Internationaux de France
8	Laurence Fournier Beaudry / Nikolaj Sørensen	Canada	119.84	2019 Nebelhorn Trophy
9	Wang Shiyue / Liu Xinyu	China	119.30	2020 Four Continents Championships
10	Lilah Fear / Lewis Gibson	Great Britain	118.68	2019 Skate Canada International

== World standings ==
=== Men's singles ===
As of March 6, 2020.

No.	Skater	Nation
1	Nathan Chen	United States
2	Yuzuru Hanyu	Japan
3	Shoma Uno	Japan
4	Dmitri Aliev	Russia
5	Mikhail Kolyada	Russia
6	Jason Brown	United States
7	Alexander Samarin	Russia
8	Matteo Rizzo	Italy
9	Jin Boyang	China
10	Cha Jun-hwan	South Korea

=== Ladies' singles ===
As of March 7, 2020.

No.	Skater	Nation
1	Rika Kihira	Japan
2	Alina Zagitova	Russia
3	Satoko Miyahara	Japan
4	Bradie Tennell	United States
5	Evgenia Medvedeva	Russia
6	Kaori Sakamoto	Japan
7	Alena Kostornaia	Russia
8	Alexandra Trusova	Russia
9	Anna Shcherbakova	Russia
10	Elizabet Tursynbayeva	Kazakhstan

=== Pairs ===
As of March 5, 2020.

No.	Team	Nation
1	Evgenia Tarasova / Vladimir Morozov	Russia
2	Peng Cheng / Jin Yang	China
3	Aleksandra Boikova / Dmitrii Kozlovskii	Russia
4	Sui Wenjing / Han Cong	China
5	Kirsten Moore-Towers / Michael Marinaro	Canada
6	Vanessa James / Morgan Ciprès	France
7	Natalia Zabiiako / Alexander Enbert	Russia
8	Nicole Della Monica / Matteo Guarise	Italy
9	Ashley Cain-Gribble / Timothy LeDuc	United States
10	Daria Pavliuchenko / Denis Khodykin	Russia

=== Ice dance ===
As of March 7, 2020.

No.	Skater	Nation
1	Victoria Sinitsina / Nikita Katsalapov	Russia
2	Madison Hubbell / Zachary Donohue	United States
3	Gabriella Papadakis / Guillaume Cizeron	France
4	Madison Chock / Evan Bates	United States
5	Charlène Guignard / Marco Fabbri	Italy
6	Piper Gilles / Paul Poirier	Canada
7	Alexandra Stepanova / Ivan Bukin	Russia
8	Kaitlin Hawayek / Jean-Luc Baker	United States
9	Lilah Fear / Lewis Gibson	Great Britain
10	Sara Hurtado / Kirill Khaliavin	Spain
