= List of shopping malls in Cyprus =

This is a list of shopping malls on the island of Cyprus.

| Rank (GLA) | Name | City | Opening Date | Gross Floor Area | Gross Leasable Area (Retail Space) | Developer |
|---|---|---|---|---|---|---|
| 1. | Nicosia Mall | Nicosia | 21 November 2018 | 82,000 square metres (880,000 sq ft) | 48,000 square metres (520,000 sq ft) | Nicosia Mall Properties (NMP) Ltd. |
| 2. | My Mall Limassol | Limassol | 30 May 2009 | 48,000 square metres (520,000 sq ft) | 48,000 square metres (520,000 sq ft) | Tiffany Investments Ltd. |
| 3. | Kings Avenue Mall | Paphos | 14 December 2013 | 90,000 square metres (970,000 sq ft) | 46,000 square metres (500,000 sq ft) | Aristo Developers |
| 4. | Metropolis Mall | Larnaca | 16 September 2021 | 40,000 square metres (430,000 sq ft) | 40,000 square metres (430,000 sq ft) | Acsion Group |
| 5. | Mall of Cyprus | Nicosia | 27 September 2007 | 60,000 square metres (650,000 sq ft) (Note: Including IKEA. The Gross Leasable Area can be considered more accurate for the mall itself.) | 31,000 square metres (330,000 sq ft) | NKS Shiakolas Group Ltd |
| 6. | Limassol Mall | Limassol | Under Construction | 76,392 square metres (822,280 sq ft) | 28,434 square metres (306,060 sq ft) | Nicosia Mall Properties, Papantoniou Group |
| 7. | Mall of Limassol | Limassol | Under Construction | 31,181 square metres (335,630 sq ft) | 27,025 square metres (290,890 sq ft) | Atterbury Europe |

== See also ==
- Nicosia Mall
- My Mall Limassol
- List of shopping streets and districts by city
