= The Artist (soundtrack) =

The Artist: Original Motion Picture Soundtrack

Soundtrack album by Ludovic Bource
- Released: 10 October 2011
- Recorded: 2011
- Studio: Studio 4, Flagey
- Genre: Soundtrack
- Length: 77:39
- Label: Sony Classical Records

The Artist (Original Motion Picture Soundtrack) is the soundtrack album to the 2011 French comedy-drama film of the same name directed by Michel Hazanavicius, and stars Jean Dujardin and Bérénice Bejo in the lead. The film features original score composed by Ludovic Bource, Michel's normal collaborator, and the album consists of 24 tracks of Bource's score, which also incorporates works from other composers such as Alberto Ginastera's "Estancia".

Bource recorded the score in April 2011 in collaboration with the Brussels Philharmonic Orchestra and Brussels Jazz Orchestra in Belgium. Most of the score was written when the film was under post-production, so that the composer and editor can create the score of their choice. As it was a silent film and the story takes place during the silent era of Hollywood (between 1927 and 1932), Michel and Bource studied about the methods of the filming of the popular directors during that era, and influenced yesteryear compositions in the late-19th and early-20th centuries, to work on the score.

The score album was released in France on 10 October 2011 and in the United Kingdom and United States on 21 October, distributed by Sony Classical Records. The album and Bource's score was positively received, with praise directing on the compositions and orchestrations, reflecting the time period. It topped the Billboard Top Soundtracks charts in the United States, and various other chart listings. The soundtrack won several awards, including Academy, Golden Globe, BAFTA and Critics' Choice awards for "Best Original Score" to Bource, in addition to various awards and nominations in that category in other ceremonies.

== Composition ==
The original score is composed by French film composer Ludovic Bource, who has been a regular collaborator of director Michel Hazanavicius, since Mes amis (1999), OSS 117: Cairo, Nest of Spies (2006) and OSS 117: Lost in Rio (2009). Most of the score was written in the editing and post-production stage, as for music playing a bigger part than normal in the story, it required numerous adjustments. Bource said that "We really couldn't afford any misinterpretation, any contradictory directions. Therefore we had to reduce certain pieces according to the editing, throw lots of them away, and write new ones, adapt them, following each step of the film that was being made. Michel and I didn't stop fine-tuning, refining."

More than 80 musicians from the Brussels Philharmonic Orchestra performed the orchestral music, which was conducted by Ernst Van Tiel, and Brussels Jazz Orchestra also co-operated. In addition, he collaborated with the Flanders Philharmonic Orchestra in Brussels for recording the score. The key musical members, consisted of 50 string players, 4 French horns, 4 trombones, 5 percussionists, a harpist, 10 technicians, 5 orchestrators and 3 mixers during the recording process, and was scored within six days during April 2011 at Flagey's Studio 4 in Brussels.

== Influences ==
As a tribute to silent film directors and their ways of filming and acting during that period, and to learn about orchestral music, Michel and Bource had to learn about some of the iconic scores during that time. He inspired works from the music featured in Charlie Chaplin films, and the compositions of Max Steiner, Franz Waxman and Bernard Herrmann.

The film's climactic scene is set to Bernard Herrmann's "Scène d'amour" from his score to Alfred Hitchcock's film Vertigo. In Vertigo, that composition similarly accompanies an extended scene without dialogue. Only one song (sung, with lyrics) is used in the soundtrack, "Pennies from Heaven", sung by Rose "Chi-Chi" Murphy (uncredited). This song was written in 1936 although the film is set between 1927 and 1932. He called creating a separate theme for Jean Dujardin's character George was toughest, as the main idea is to "respect the combination of comedy and emotion".

While composing for the tap dance theme, Bource said that the theme, was "less complicated than the rest. It's big band music, jazz dance music. Technically, it was risky. They had recorded the tap dancing parts to a Cole Porter piece and we had to find exactly the same rhythm, fitting George and Peppy's choreography to the very fortieth of second." The theme "The Sound of Tears" was inspired from Johannes Brahms's "Sapphic Ode".

== Reception ==
Professional ratings
Review scores
Source	Rating
Filmtracks	4/5 stars
Screen Invasion	5/5 stars
Static Mass Emporium	5/5 stars

The score was positively received by critics. Filmtracks.com wrote "The most important element of success in the score is its extroverted and generally optimistic personality; This kind of music was never meant to be subtle, and the composer responds with a tone so emotionally communicative that it may overflow with exuberance to too great of an extent for some listeners. Bource and Hazanavicius, who played this genre of music on set to put the actors in the right mood for the shoot, very consciously attempted to avoid creating a parody. The hopelessly chipper attitude of the music will cause the score to sound like a parody to some listeners nevertheless, and if you have misgivings about this sound to begin with, then be aware that The Artist could drive a person mad. Along with a handful of source pieces on the very long album, the score will predictably expose generational divides and likely have difficulty earning more than intellectual respect from those solely accustomed to the Digital Age of film music."

Simon Gage of Daily Express wrote "the soundtrack harks back to the glory days of Chaplin and Buster Keaton while bringing sweeping orchestral pieces in for good measure". A. O. Scott of The New York Times stated "There is a lot of music on the soundtrack and also a few strategic moments of onscreen noise that are both delightfully surprising and wildly illogical. The Artist," as aggressively entertaining as any musical, is measured in its mourning and eclectic in its nostalgia for old movies. There is a bit of music lifted from Bernard Herrmann's 'Vertigo' score, a breakfast-table montage inspired by 'Citizen Kane' and a story line that makes 'The Artist,' in essence, the latest (and also in a way the earliest, but surely not the last) remake of A Star Is Born".

Several review websites including, The Hollywood Reporter and IndieWire, listed as one of the "Best Scores of 2011" and Collider, IndieWire, and Insider Inc. listed The Artist's score as one of the "best scores of the decade".

== Track listing ==
No.	Title	Performer(s)	Length
1.	"The Artist Ouverture"	Brussels Philharmonic Orchestra	1:02
2.	"1927: A Russian Affair"	Brussels Philharmonic Orchestra	3:36
3.	"George Valentin"	Brussels Philharmonic Orchestra	5:35
4.	"Pretty Peppy"	Brussels Jazz Orchestra	2:32
5.	"At the Kinograph Studios"	Brussels Philharmonic Orchestra	1:37
6.	"Fantaisie d'amour"	Brussels Philharmonic Orchestra	3:09
7.	"Waltz for Peppy"	Brussels Philharmonic Orchestra	3:22
8.	"Estancia Op. 8 Movement 2" (written by Alberto Ginastera)	Brussels Philharmonic Orchestra	3:40
9.	"Imagination"	Red Nichols and His Five Pennies	2:56
10.	"Silent Rumble"	Brussels Jazz Orchestra	1:16
11.	"1929"	Brussels Philharmonic Orchestra	1:30
12.	"In the Stairs"	Brussels Jazz Orchestra	3:15
13.	"Jubilee Stomp"	Duke Ellington	2:33
14.	"Comme une rosée de larmes"	Brussels Philharmonic Orchestra	3:24
15.	"The Sound of Tears"	Brussels Philharmonic Orchestra	4:47
16.	"Pennies from Heaven"	Rose Murphy	2:13
17.	"1931"	Brussels Philharmonic Orchestra	4:44
18.	"Jungle Bar"	Brussels Jazz Orchestra	2:07
19.	"L'Ombre des flammes"	Brussels Philharmonic Orchestra	5:57
20.	"Happy Ending..."	Brussels Jazz Orchestra	5:43
21.	"Charming Blackmail"	Brussels Philharmonic Orchestra	2:12
22.	"Ghosts from the Past"	Brussels Philharmonic Orchestra	2:00
23.	"My Suicide (Dedicated to 29 March 1967)"	Brussels Philharmonic Orchestra	6:24
24.	"Peppy and George"	Brussels Philharmonic Orchestra	2:05

== Chart positions ==
Chart (2012)	Peak position
Belgian Albums (Ultratop Flanders)	52
Belgian Albums (Ultratop Wallonia)	70
French Albums (SNEP)	37
Spanish Albums (Promusicae)	34
US Top Soundtracks (Billboard)	19

== Certifications ==
Region	Certification	Certified units/sales
France (SNEP)	Platinum	100,000^{*}
^{*} Sales figures based on certification alone.

== Accolades ==
Award	Date of ceremony (Note: Each date is linked to the article about the awards held that year, wherever possible.)	Category	Recipients	Result	Ref.
Academy Awards	26 February 2012	Best Original Score	Ludovic Bource	Won	
Alliance of Women Film Journalists	10 January 2012	Best Film Music or Score	Ludovic Bource	Nominated	
BMI Film & TV Awards	17 May 2012	Film Music Award	Ludovic Bource	Won	
British Academy Film Awards	12 February 2012	Best Music	Ludovic Bource	Won	
César Awards	24 February 2012	Best Music Written for a Film	Ludovic Bource	Won	
Chicago Film Critics Association	7 January 2012	Best Original Score	Ludovic Bource	Nominated	
Critics' Choice Movie Awards	12 January 2012	Best Composer	Ludovic Bource	Won	
European Film Awards	3 December 2011	Best Composer	Ludovic Bource	Won	
Golden Globe Awards	15 January 2012	Best Original Score	Ludovic Bource	Won	
Grammy Awards	10 February 2013	Best Score Soundtrack For Visual Media	Ludovic Bource	Nominated	
Houston Film Critics Society	14 December 2011	Best Score	Ludovic Bource	Won	
New York Film Critics Online	11 December 2011	Best Original Score	Ludovic Bource	Won	
San Diego Film Critics Society	14 December 2011	Best Score	Ludovic Bource	Nominated	
St. Louis Gateway Film Critics Association	19 December 2011	Best Music	Ludovic Bource	Won	
Washington D.C. Area Film Critics Association	5 December 2011	Best Original Score	Ludovic Bource	Won	
