= Marilena Kitromilis =

Cypriot-American figure skater

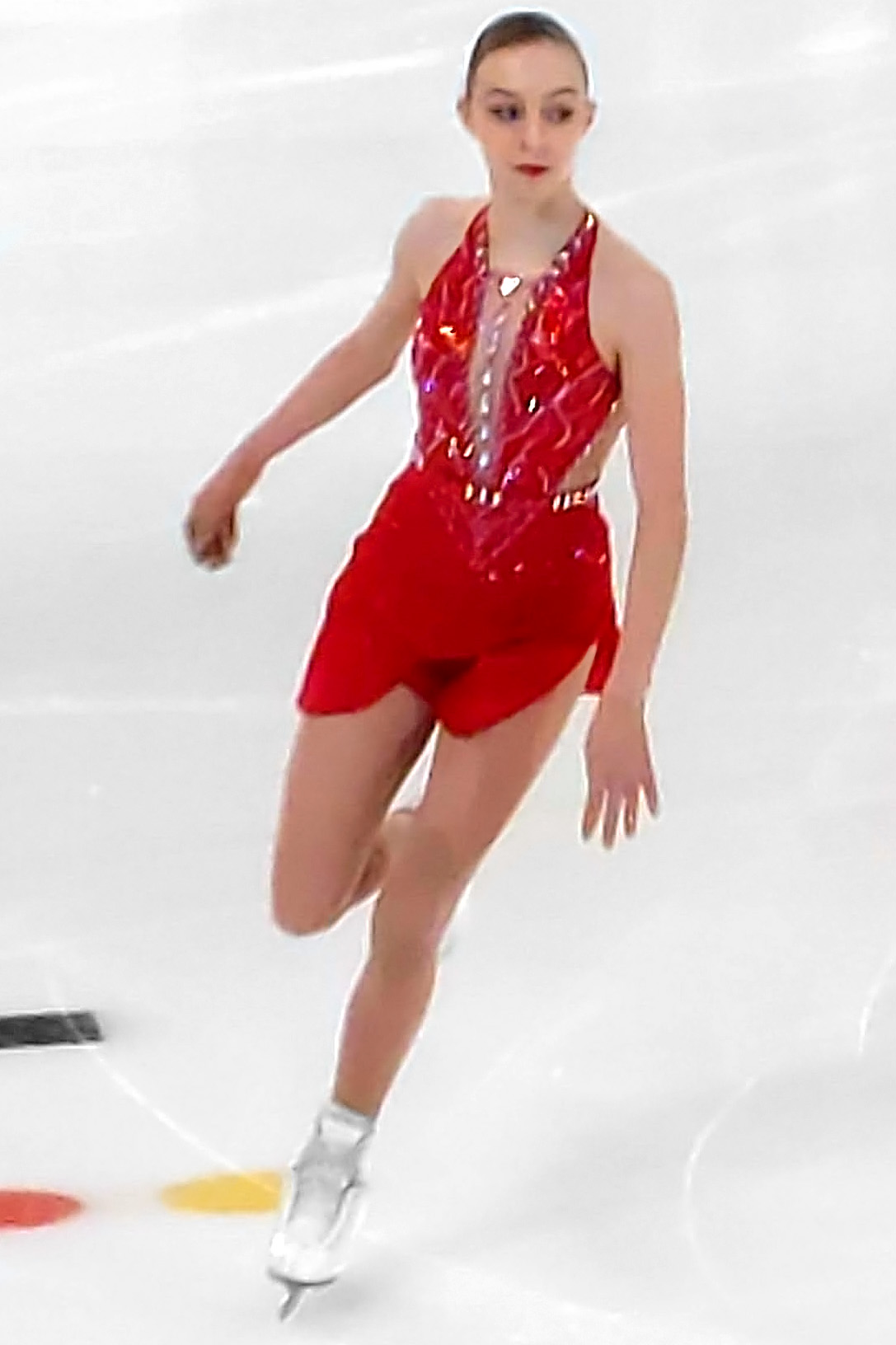
- Kitromilis at 2022 Skate America

Personal information
- Born: October 15, 2004 (age 22) Georgetown, D.C., U.S.
- Height: 5 ft 4 in (1.63 m)

Figure skating career
- Country: Cyprus (since 2020); United States (until 2020)
- Coach: Andrei Lutai; Ina Lutai
- Skating club: Leader FSC
- Began skating: 2008

Marilena Kitromilis (born October 15, 2004) is a Cypriot-American figure skater who represents Cyprus in women's singles skating. She is the 2021 CS Autumn Classic International champion. She is the first Cypriot figure skater to win an ISU-sanctioned international competition. Kitromilis also made history by being the first Cypriot figure skater to compete at an ISU Grand Prix event (2022 Skate America).

== Personal life ==
Kitromilis was born on October 15, 2004, to her Cypriot mother, Maria Kitromilis, and American father, William Adams. She has a twin brother, Mikhail. Though born and raised in the United States, Kitromilis is of Cypriot descent. She traveled to Cyprus multiple times throughout her childhood to spend summers with the families of her grandfather's siblings and many cousins. Her maternal grandfather was born and raised in Karavas, Cyprus. She enjoys reading books of various genres in her free time.

== Career ==
=== Early years ===
Kitromilis started skating on ponds with her mother and twin brother at the age of two and half. She began learn-to-skate classes at four years old and quickly progressed to private lessons. She competed domestically in the United States at the juvenile through novice levels before transitioning to represent Cyprus, internationally, in advance of the 2020–21 season.

=== 2020–21 season ===
Kitromilis made her international senior debut representing Cyprus in October at the 2020 CS Budapest Trophy, where she finished twelfth. She competed at one other international event that season, the 2020 Santa Claus Cup, where she placed sixth. Throughout the 2020–21 season, Kitromilis was in the process of transitioning to a new coaching team from former coaches Mark Mitchell and Peter Johansson. She changed coaches to Olga Ganicheva, Aleksey Letov, and Sergei Minaev.

=== 2021–22 season ===
Kitromilis opened the Olympic season competing at the Cranberry Cup in mid-August in Norwood, Massachusetts. She placed eighth in the short program and tenth in the free skate to finish eighth overall. At her second assignment of the season, Kitromilis earned her first international title by winning the 2021 CS Autumn Classic International, with a solid performance, in what was considered an upset victory. She scored personal bests in both segments of the competition, as well as overall. She won the gold medal ahead of South Korean competitors You Young and Ji Seo-yeon. Kitromilis' scores met the required technical minimums to allow her to compete at the 2022 European and World Championships. She is the first-ever Cypriot figure skater to win an ISU-sanctioned international competition.

She competed at two more Challenger events in the fall, the 2021 CS Warsaw Cup and the 2021 CS Golden Spin of Zagreb, where she finished twelfth and fifth, respectively. In January 2022, Kitromilis made her European Championships debut in Tallinn, Estonia. She finished thirty-second in the short program and did not advance to the free skate. She was thirtieth in the short program at her 2022 World Championship debut.

=== 2022–23 season ===
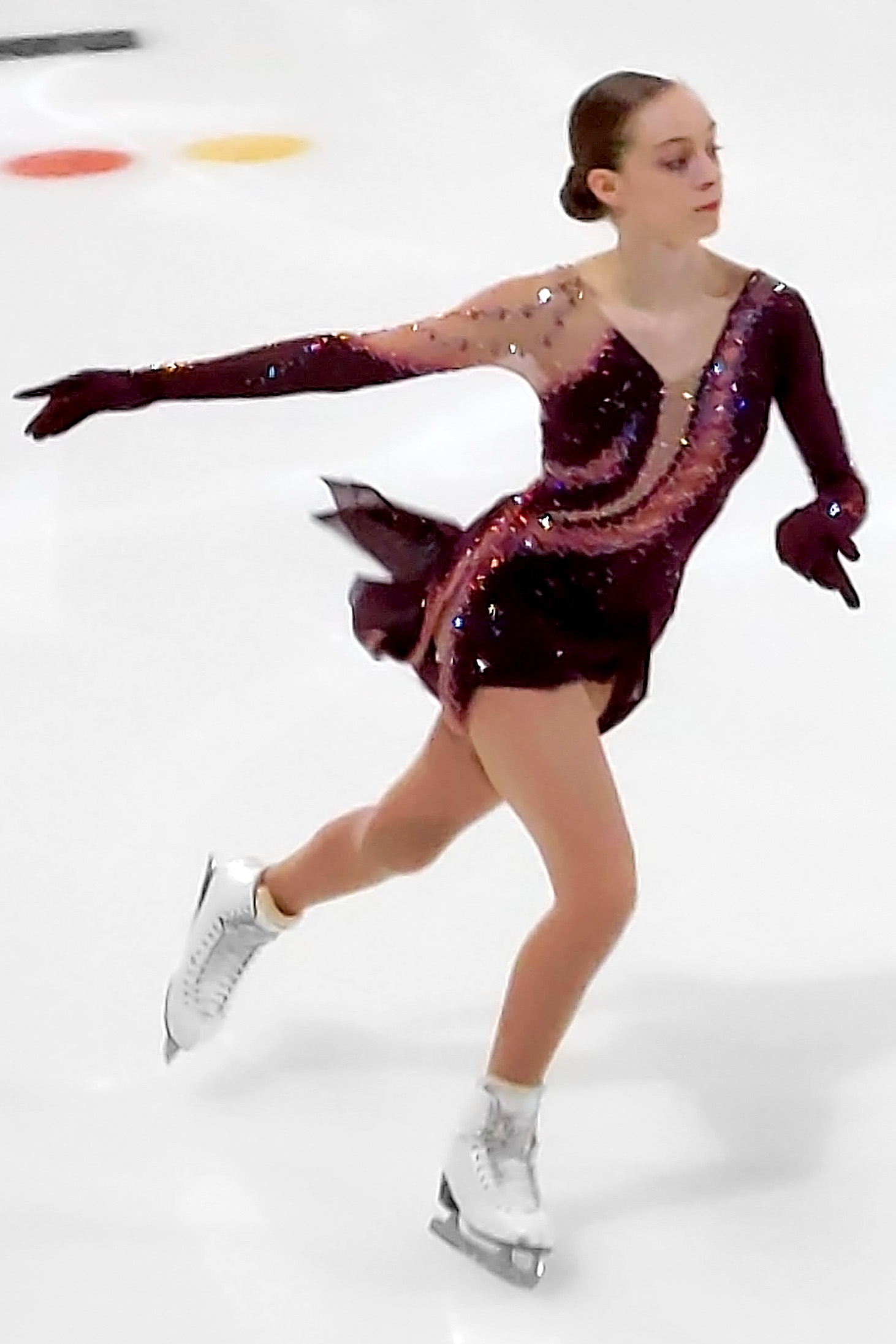
Kitromilis at the 2022 Skate America

Kitromilis began this season with an injury to her left knee. After finishing ninth at the 2022 U.S. Classic, Kitromilis made her Grand Prix debut at 2022 Skate America. Despite the pain in her knee, she competed and finished eleventh. Kitromilis then competed at the 2022 CS Warsaw Cup and the 2022 CS Golden Spin before going to Latvia for the 2022 Latvia Trophy, where she placed third overall.

At the 2023 European Championships, she finished in eighteenth place after the SP after a misstep in her footwork. She placed thirteenth overall after the free skate, where she was in tenth place with a season's best score. A week later, Kitromilis competed at the 2023 Bavarian Open, where she placed third overall. She also changed coaches to Sergei Komolov and relocated to Dubai for training. Going into the 2023 World Championships in Saitama, Kitromilis faced difficulties training with her ongoing knee injury going into Worlds and came in thirty-first overall, which was not enough to reach the free skate. At the end of the season, she ranked 46th in the ISU season's world ranking for women.

=== 2023–24 season ===
Kitromilis did not compete this season. She entered the 2023 Golden Spin of Zagreb, but she withdrew in November. In February 2024, she underwent surgery for her knee injury.

=== 2024–25 season ===
Kitromilis changed coaches to Andrei Lutai and began training in Sofia, Bulgaria. Making her return to competition, she finished sixteenth at the 2024 Denkova-Staviski Cup and seventeenth at the 2024 CS Tallinn Trophy. She went on to compete at the 2024 Bosphorus Cup and 2024 EduSport Trophy, where she placed fourth and seventh, respectively. In late December, she was an out-of-competition guest competitor at the Bulgarian Figure Skating Championships. The following month, it was announced that Kitromilis had relocated to Sofia, Bulgaria to train under coaches, Andrei and Ina Lutai.

Going to compete at the 2025 Bellu Memorial, Kritromilis finished the event in fifth place. She then went on to place twelfth at the 2025 Sonja Henie Trophy and win gold at the 2025 Black Sea Ice Cup.

=== 2025–26 season ===
Kitromilis began her season by competing at the Robin Cousins Cup in Sheffield where she finished in 6th place overall. Subsequently, she went onto finish 21st at the Denkova-Staviski Cup and 16th at the Golden Spin of Zagreb.

In January, she placed 7th at the Sofia Trophy. The following month, she competed the short program segment at Skate Berlin International before withdrawing from the free skate segment.

== Programs ==
Season	Short program	Free skating	Exhibition
2025–2026	N'iniste pas; T'es où by Camille Lellouche choreo. by Sergei Komolov	Melodramma (Live From Teatro Del Silenzio); by Andrea Bocelli	
2024–2025	N'iniste pas; T'es où by Camille Lellouche choreo. by Sergei Komolov	Mother; Lion Theme (from Lion) by Dustin O'Halloran & Hauschka; Run With Your Heart by Dream Cave choreo. by Sergei Komolov	
2023–2024	Masquerade Waltz by Aram Khachaturian choreo. by Sergei Komolov	What a Wonderful World by Bob Thiele and George David Weiss performed by 2WEI; Cernunnos by Christian Reindl and Lucie Paradis; Mad World by Tears for Fears performed by 2WEI choreo. by Sergei Komolov	
2022–2023	Mamma la rondinella; Taranta by Ludovico Einaudi choreo. by Benoît Richaud	Mother; Lion Theme (from Lion) by Dustin O'Halloran and Hauschka; Run With Your Heart by Dream Cave choreo. by Benoît Richaud	Faded by Alan Walker
2021–2022	Moonlight Sonata by Ludwig van Beethoven performed by Depeche Mode choreo. by Olga Ganicheva	The Four Seasons by Antonio Vivaldi arr. by Abel Korzeniowski choreo. by Olga Ganicheva	

== Competitive highlights ==
- GP – Event of the ISU Grand Prix Series
- CS – Event of the ISU Challenger Series
- TBD – Assigned
- WD – Withdrew from competition

Competition placements at senior level
Season	2020–21	2021–22	2022–23	2023–24	2024–25	2025–26
World Championships		30th	31st			
European Championships		31st	13th			
Cyprus Championships			1st			
GP Skate America			11th			
CS Autumn Classic		1st				
CS Budapest Trophy	12th					
CS Golden Spin of Zagreb		5th	11th	WD		16th
CS Tallinn Trophy					17th	
CS U.S. Classic			9th			
CS Warsaw Cup		12th	19th			
Bavarian Open			3rd			
Bellu Memorial					5th	
Bosphorus Cup					4th	
Black Sea Ice Cup					1st	
Cranberry Cup		8th				
Denkova-Staviski Cup					16th	21st
EduSport Trophy					7th	
Latvia Trophy			3rd			
Robin Cousins Cup						6th
Santa Claus Cup	6th					
Skate Berlin						WD
Sofia Trophy						7th
Sonja Henje Trophy					12th	

== Detailed results ==
ISU personal best scores in the +5/-5 GOE System
Segment	Type	Score	Event
Total	TSS	180.72	2021 CS Autumn Classic International
Short program	TSS	61.33	2021 CS Autumn Classic International
Short program	TES	35.57	2021 CS Autumn Classic International
Short program	PCS	26.02	2022 World Championships
Free skating	TSS	119.39	2021 CS Autumn Classic International
Free skating	TES	61.95	2021 CS Autumn Classic International
Free skating	PCS	57.44	2021 CS Autumn Classic International

Results in the 2025–26 season
Date	Event	SP		FS		Total	
Date	Event	P	Score	P	Score	P	Score
Aug 21–22, 2025	(United Kingdom) 2025 Robin Cousins Cup	5	43.71	6	78.64	6	122.35
Nov 7–9, 2025	(Bulgaria) 2025 Denkova-Staviski Cup	18	45.50	21	75.19	21	120.69
Dec 3–6, 2025	(Croatia) 2025 CS Golden Spin of Zagreb	14	51.13	17	89.90	16	141.03
Jan 6-11, 2026	(Bulgaria) 2026 Sofia Trophy	10	38.92	6	86.86	7	125.78
Feb 17-21, 2026	(Germany) 2026 Skate Berlin International	13	39.53	—N/a	—N/a	WD	—N/a

2024-25 season
Date	Event	SP	FS	Total
April 5–6, 2025	2025 Black Sea Ice Cup	1; 54.83	2; 91.73	1; 146.56
March 6–9, 2025	2025 Sonja Henie Trophy	13; 41.64	11; 84.15	12; 125.79
February 18–23, 2025	2025 Bellu Memorial	2; 56.83	6; 105.07	5; 161.90
December 12-15, 2024	2024 EduSport Trophy	7; 46.94	6; 89.33	7; 136.27
Nov. 25 – Dec. 1, 2024	2024 Bosphorus Cup	4; 49.98	3; 93.51	4; 143.49
November 11–17, 2024	2024 CS Tallinn Trophy	8; 49.72	19; 71.28	17; 121.00
November 5–10, 2024	2024 Denkova-Staviski Cup	7; 53.51	17; 82.48	16; 135.99
2022–23 season
Date	Event	SP	FS	Total
March 22–26, 2023	2023 World Championships	31; 48.92	-	31; 48.92
Jan. 31 – Feb. 5, 2023	2023 Bavarian Open	5; 50.31	3; 100.94	3; 151.25
January 25–29, 2023	2023 European Championships	18; 53.71	10; 105.20	13; 158.91
December 17–18, 2022	2022 Latvia Trophy	1; 64.92	5; 100.89	3; 165.81
December 7–10, 2022	2022 CS Golden Spin of Zagreb	5; 54.58	14; 95.43	11; 150.01
November 16–20, 2022	2022 CS Warsaw Cup	24; 39.32	16; 88.98	19; 128.30
October 21–23, 2022	2022 Skate America	12; 46.01	11; 89.47	11; 135.48
September 13–16, 2022	2022 CS U.S. Classic	7; 52.55	11; 77.09	9; 129.64
2021–22 season
March 21–27, 2022	2022 World Championships	30; 53.32	–	30; 53.32
January 10–16, 2022	2022 European Championships	32; 44.03	-	32; 44.03
December 9–11, 2021	2021 CS Golden Spin of Zagreb	5; 58.71	5; 108.24	5; 166.65
November 17–20, 2021	2021 CS Warsaw Cup	12; 54.77	12; 102.35	12; 157.12
September 16–18, 2021	2021 CS Autumn Classic	1; 61.33	2; 119.39	1; 180.72
August 11–15, 2021	2021 Cranberry Cup International	8; 57.93	10; 101.46	8; 159.39
2020–21 season
November 26–29, 2021	2020 Santa Claus Cup	9; 38.11	5; 94.82	6; 132.93
October 14–17, 2021	2020 CS Budapest Trophy	14; 33.10	11; 83.20	12; 116.30
