= My Mall Limassol =

Shopping centre in Zakaki, Cyprus

Coordinates: 34.6525°N 32.9967°E

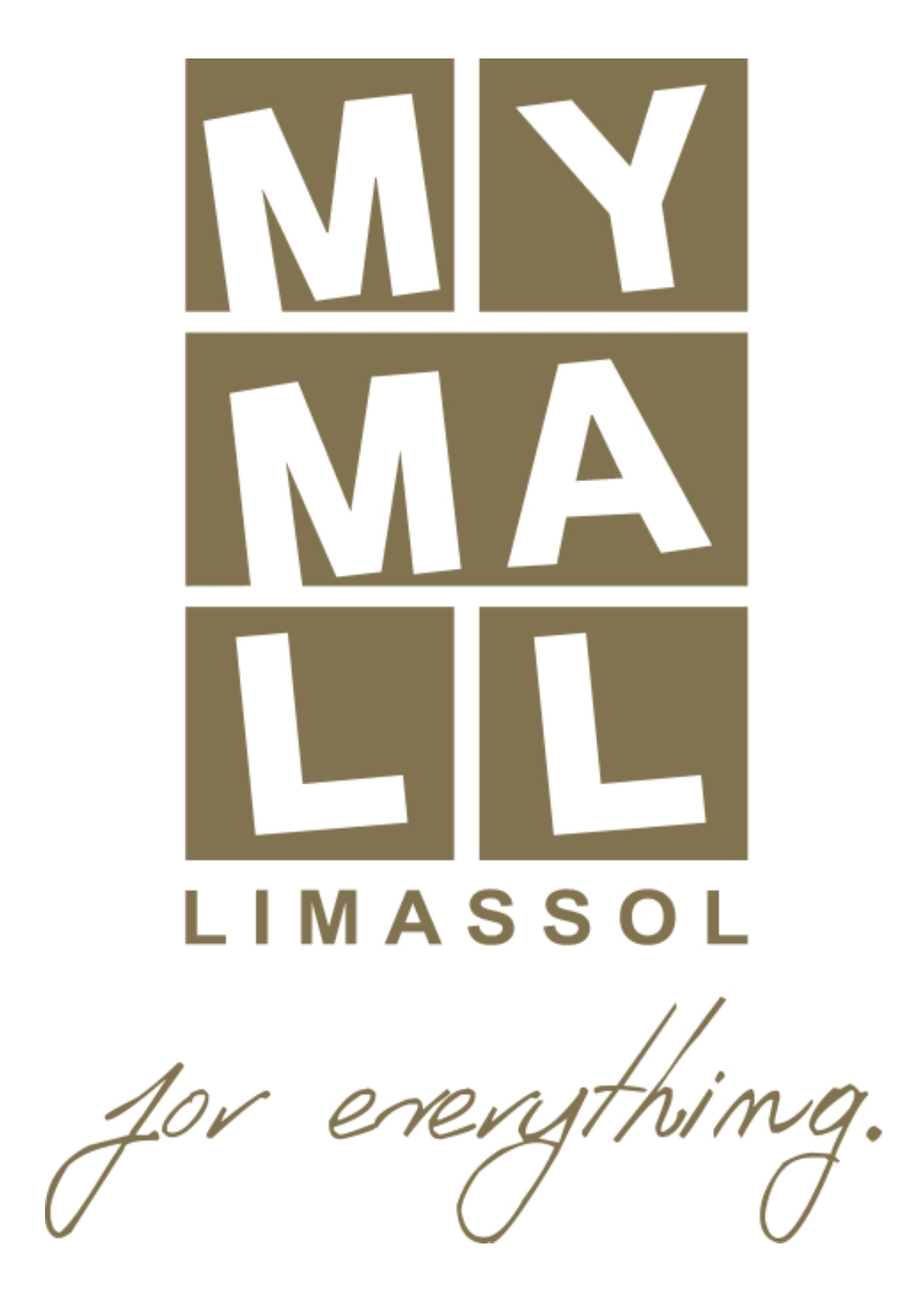

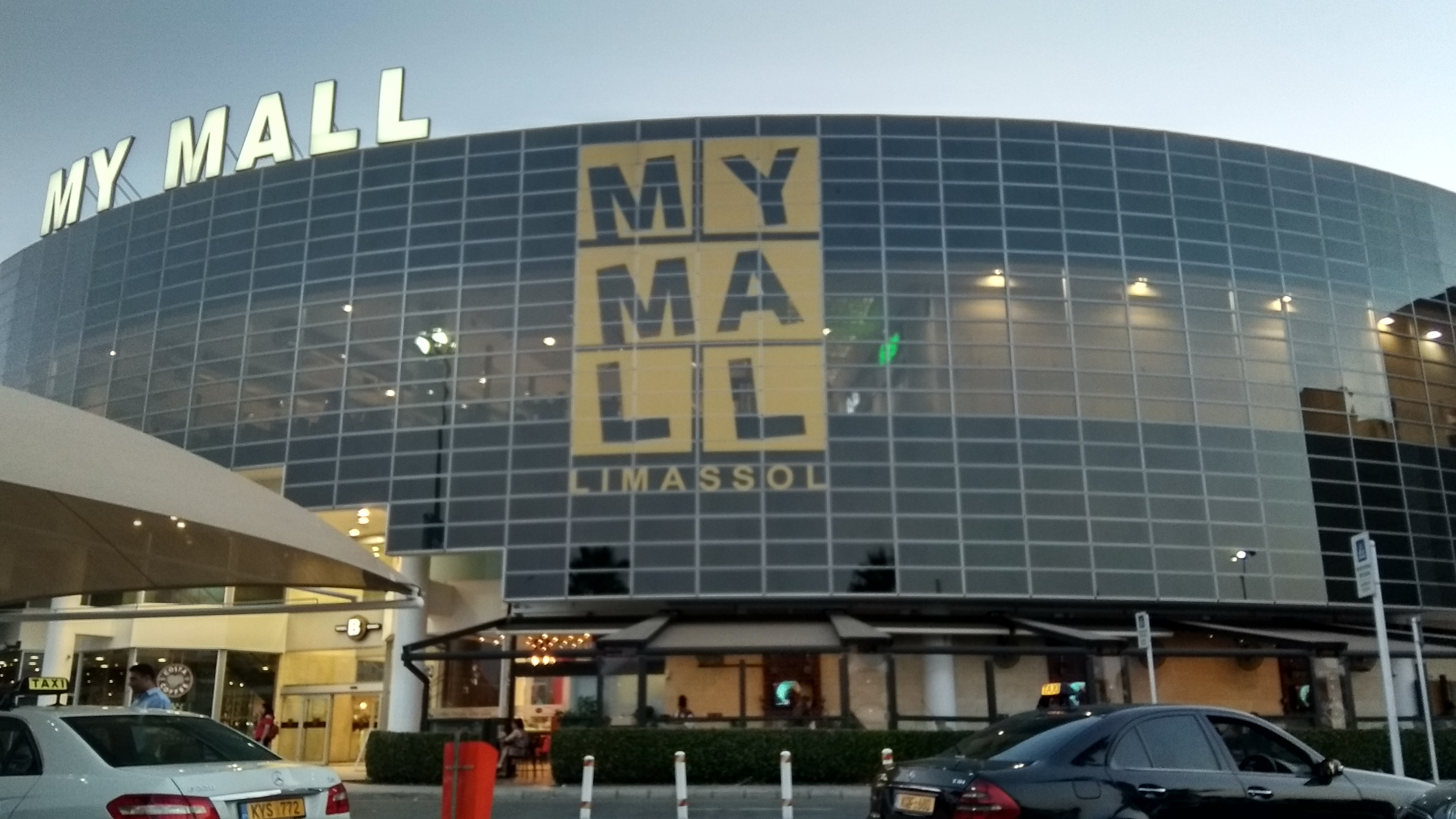
- Main Entrance to My Mall Limassol.
- Location: Limassol, Cyprus
- Address: 285, Franklin Roosevelt, Limassol 3150, Cyprus
- Opened: 30 May 2009
- Developer: Tiffany Investments Ltd.
- Architect: George Mavromatis
- Num. of stores: 140+
- Num. of anchor tenants: 4
- Floor area: 48,000 square metres (520,000 sq ft)
- Floors: 3
- Parking: 1,600 spots
- Public transit: EMEL 7 18 20 21 30 MYMALL
- Website: www.mymall.com.cy

MY MALL Limassol is a shopping centre in Zakaki, a western suburb of Limassol, Cyprus. It is the second largest mall in size in Cyprus. The mall was originally named "Tiffany Mall", but the name was changed in 2009 following complaints from other holders of the rights to the Tiffany name.

== Facilities ==
This mall hosts a number of retail stores.

The mall contains an ice rink, a bowling alley, an arcade, 6D Cinema and a small play area, located in the lower level of the mall.

A food court is located on the first floor of the mall with two restaurants and a selection of fast food takeaways.

== Transportation ==
A "Shuttle Bus" service runs between the mall and major hotels in Limassol.

EMEL, the entity responsible of Limassol’s bus routes, runs buses from Limassol to the mall (the schedules of which can be found at the mall's website).

The only other means of getting there is by car. At busy times there is significant risk of traffic congestion.

A new road had been constructed at the time to link the mall to the Limassol-Paphos-Nicosia Highway, by a dual carriage way, that is primarily intended to serve a nearby industrial estate and the Limassol New Port, to relieve local roads of heavy goods vehicles calling at those locations.

== See also ==
- Limassol District
- List of shopping malls in Cyprus
