= Valentina Chebotareva =

Russian figure skating coach

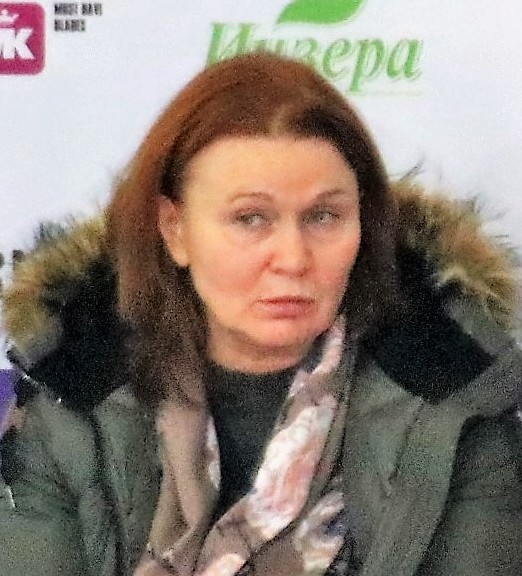
- Chebotareva in 2018

Personal information
- Native name: Валентина Михайловна Чеботарёва (Russian)
- Full name: Valentina Mikhailovna Chebotareva
- Born: 8 April 1960 (age 66)

Valentina Mikhailovna Chebotareva (Russian: Валентина Михайловна Чеботарёва; 8 April 1960) is a Russian figure skating coach.

== Biography ==
She was born on 8 April 1960. Works in Sports school in St. Petersburg.

Her team participated in major international competitions. In particular, the skater Mikhail Kolyada is a silver medalist of the 2018 Winter Olympics (team competitions) and a bronze medalist of the World Championship 2018; Stanislava Konstantinova a participant of the World Championship (2018) and bronze medalist of the Winter Universiade (2019).
