= Devid Naryzhnyy =

Russian figure skater (born 1999)

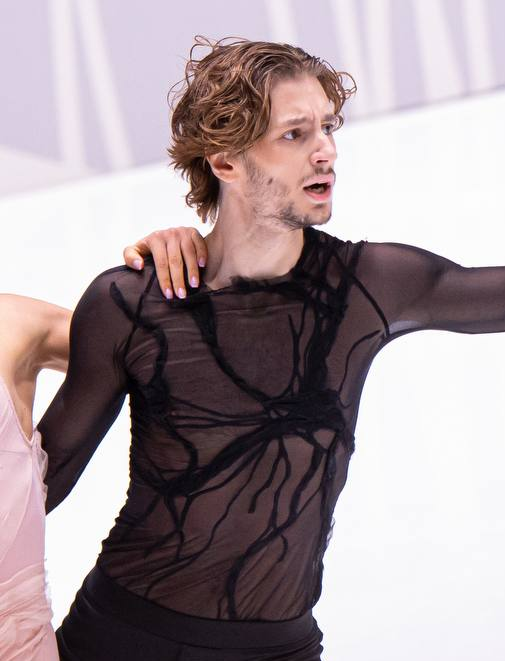
- At the 2024 Russian Figure Skating Championships

Personal information
- Native name: Девид Юрьевич Нарижный
- Full name: Devid Yurievich Naryzhnyy
- Other names: Devid Narizhniy
- Born: 11 October 1999 (age 27) Kharkiv, Ukraine
- Height: 1.85 m (6 ft 1 in)

Figure skating career
- Country: (Individual Neutral Athletes) Individual Neutral Athlete; Russia
- Partner: Irina Khavronina
- Coach: Alexander Zhulin
- Began skating: 2004
Medal record
Representing Russia
Figure skating: Ice dancing
World Junior Championships
Bronze medal – third place	2020 Tallinn	Ice dancing
Junior Grand Prix Final
Bronze medal – third place	2019–20 Turin	Ice dancing
Russian Championships
Bronze medal – third place	2025 Omsk	Ice dancing
Bronze medal – third place	2024 Chelyabinsk	Ice dancing

Devid Yurievich Naryzhnyy (Russian: Девид Юрьевич Нарижный, born 11 October 1999) is a Russian competitive ice dancer. With his former skating partner, Elizaveta Shanaeva, he is the 2020 World Junior bronze medalist and the 2019–20 Junior Grand Prix Final bronze medalist. He also won three medals on the ISU Junior Grand Prix series, including gold medals at 2019 France and 2019 Russia.

With his skating partner Irina Khavronina he is a two-time Russian Nationals bronze medalist.

== Personal life ==
Devid Yurievich Naryzhnyy was born on 11 October 1999 in Kharkiv, Ukraine. His parents, Olena/Elena Pyatash and Andrei Penkin are also figure skaters.

== Career ==
=== Early years ===
Naryzhnyy began learning to skate when his parents were part of an ice show in England when he was three years old. As a young skater, he trained in Kharkiv, coached by Galina Churilova, and Saint Petersburg. He also trained in Sochi for about six months, where his father had been offered a job. After moving to Moscow, he was coached by Ekaterina Rubleva and then met his next coaches, Irina Zhuk and Alexander Svinin, when Rubleva began working with them.

Naryzhnyy trained with his first ice dancing partner for about a year and later skated with Varvara Chekmeneva. He teamed up with Elizaveta Shanaeva during the 2016–2017 season. They were coached by Irina Zhuk and Alexander Svinin.

Shanaeva/Naryzhnyy won the 2017 Moscow Championship.

=== 2018–2019 season ===
Shanaeva/Naryzhnyy received their first ISU Junior Grand Prix (JGP) assignments in the 2018–19 season. They won the silver medal at 2018 JGP Bratislava and placed 4th at 2018 JGP Yerevan.

In November 2018, they won the junior gold medal at the 2018 Grand Prix of Bratislava. They placed fourth at the 2019 Russian Junior Championships.

=== 2019–2020 season ===
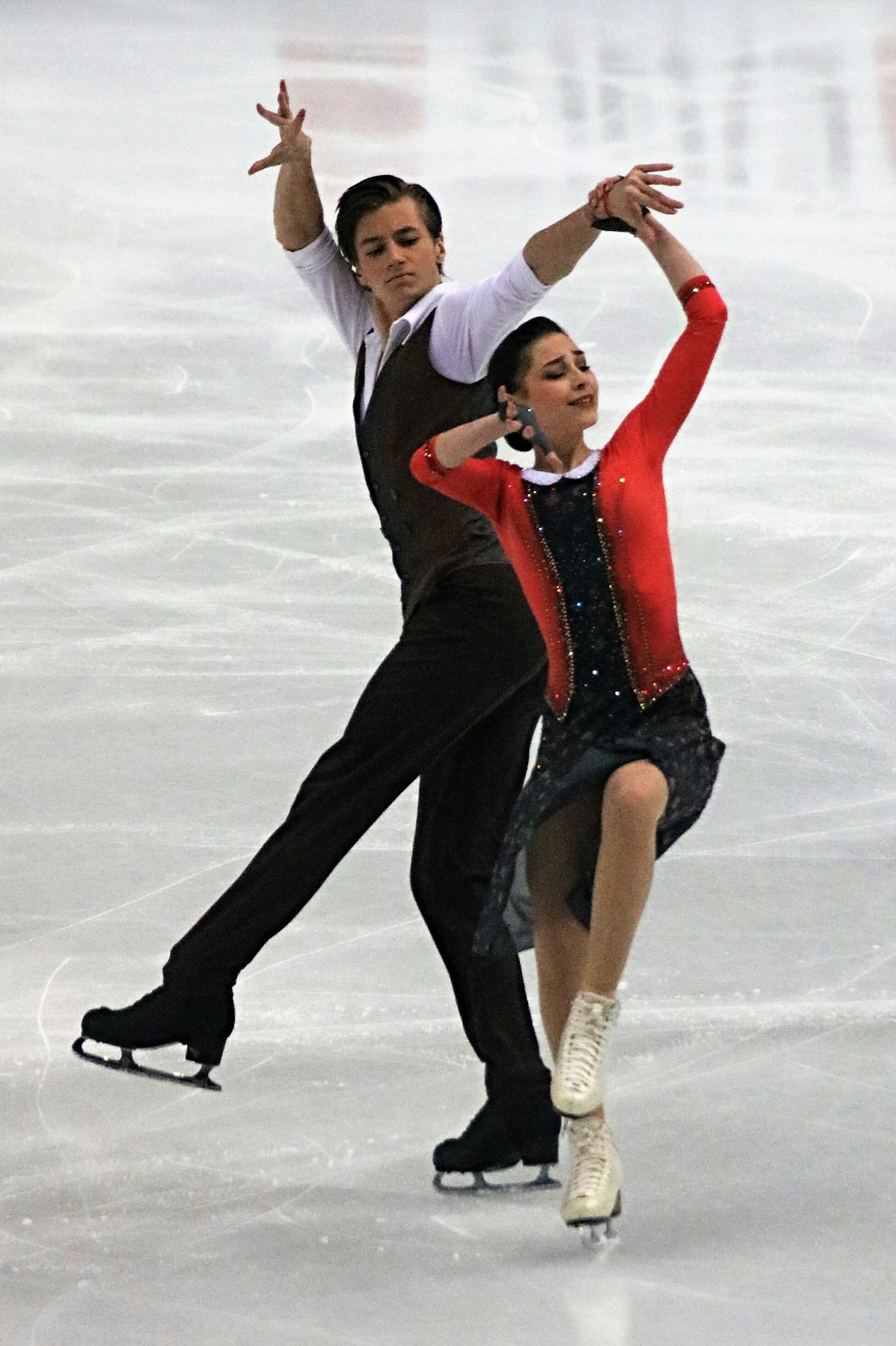
Shanaeva/Naryzhnyy at the 2019–20 Grand Prix of Figure Skating Final

Returning to the Junior Grand Prix, Shanaeva/Naryzhnyy won their first JGP gold medal in September at the 2019 JGP France in Courchevel. Three weeks later, they won a second gold medal at the 2019 JGP Russia in Chelyabinsk. With these results, they qualified for the 2019–20 ISU Junior Grand Prix Final in Turin. Shanaeva/Naryzhnyy placed third in the rhythm dance there, with her describing them as "quite happy" with their performance. They were also third in the free dance, despite Naryzhnyy missing a twizzle level, and won the bronze medal.

After winning the junior national title at the 2020 Russian Junior Championships, Shanaeva/Naryzhnyy were assigned to compete at the 2020 World Junior Championships in Tallinn, Estonia. First in the free dance, they won a small gold medal for the segment, becoming the only team to score above 70 points in the junior rhythm dance that season. Third in the free dance, they dropped to third place overall and won the bronze medal. Shanaeva said, "we got a lot of energy to show our maximum next season and to be ready to beat everyone."

=== 2020–2021 season ===
After junior Russian test skates in August, both became ill with COVID-19, first Shanaeva and then Naryzhnyy. This caused them to miss the first half of the season, competing only in December, on the fifth stage of the domestic Cup of Russia series, but having to withdraw after the rhythm dance due to Naryzhnyy getting food poisoning.

At the beginning of February, they competed on the 2021 Russian Junior Championships in Krasnoyarsk, placing third in the rhythm dance, second in the free dance and second overall. They claimed to be happy with their performances after such a difficult period, defining their result as a "silver medal with a golden shine."

They were scheduled to participate in the Russian Cup Final in Moscow but withdrew for medical reasons. On the 17 and 18 of April, they performed in Team Tutberidze's show Champions on Ice in Krasnodar and Sochi.

=== 2021–2022 season ===
Moving to the international senior level, Shanaeva/Naryzhnyy won the bronze medal at the Budapest Trophy. They went on to make their senior Grand Prix debut at the 2021 Skate Canada International, where they finished in ninth place.

In December, Shanaeva/Naryzhnyy competed on the 2022 Russian Championship in Saint Petersburg, placing eighth in the rhythm dance and fifth in the free dance and finishing fifth overall. They were on the list of three reserve teams for the 2022 Winter Olympics, but after the Russian Championships the duo split up with Naryzhnyy saying that he made the decision due to disagreements about their training routines. In February 2022 after successful try-outs he teamed up with Annabelle Morozov.

=== 2022–2023 season ===
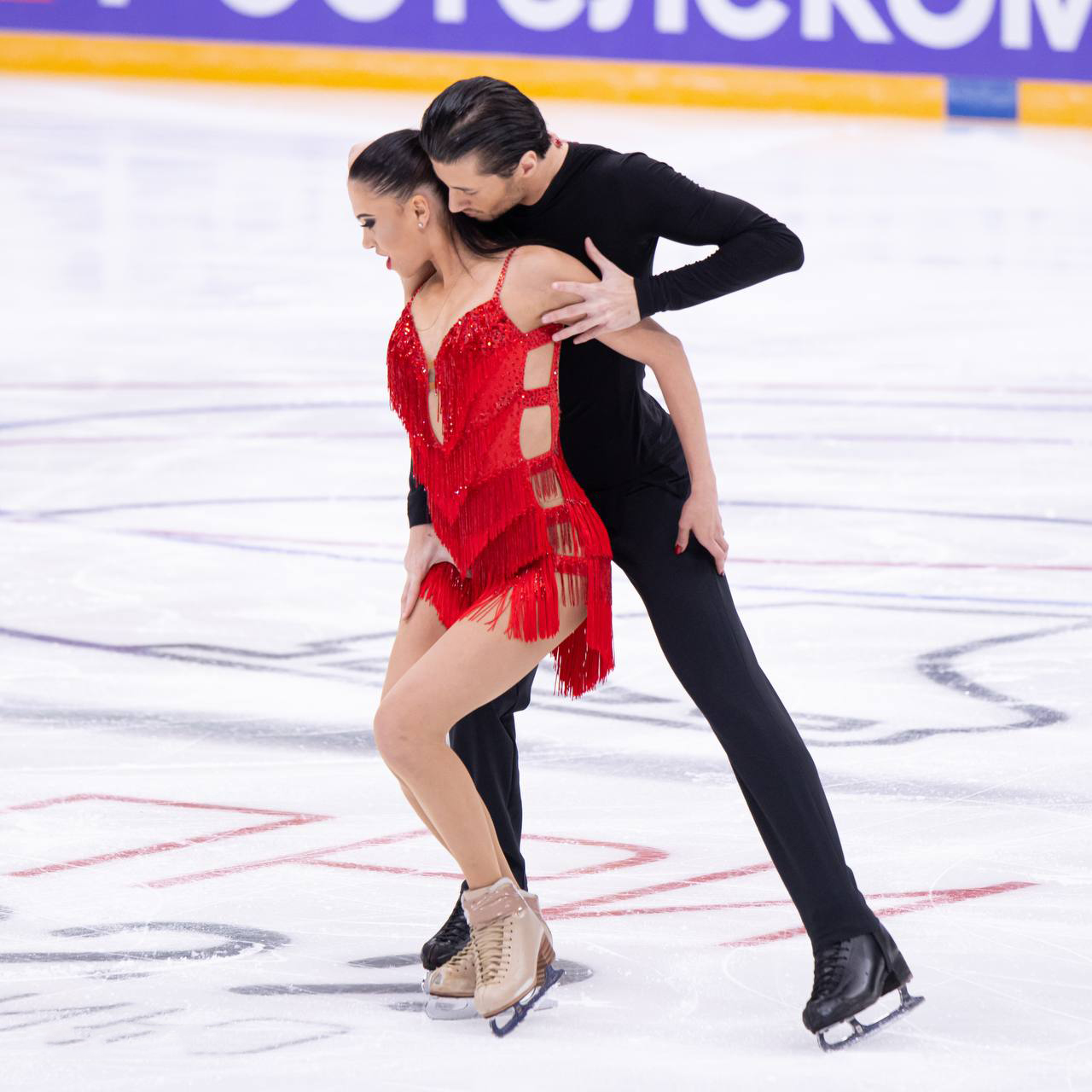
Morozov/Naryzhnyy performing their Rhythm Dance at the 2022 Golden Skate in Moscow

Morozov and Naryzhnyy were coached by a joint team of Irina Zhuk, Alexander Svinin, Alexei Gorshkov and Nikolai Morozov. They spent summer 2022 in the USA preparing for the upcoming season with Nikolai Morozov and returned to Russia in September to take part in the 2022 Russian Test Skates. However, they had to withdraw due to Morozov's minor injury. Their first competition was "Golden Skate of Moscow" of the Grand Prix of Russia, where they won gold. They went on to win another gold medal at their next Russian Grand Prix event, "Idel-2022". After a promising start they were considered among the top contenders for the 2023 Russian Nationals podium. However, prior to the event the couple's break-up was suddenly announced in the media and confirmed by the Figure Skating Federation of Russia. Morozov and Naryzhnyy later revealed that they weren't able to agree on their preferred training locations and future plans. Morozov then departed for the US, teaming up with Igor Eremenko later, and Naryzhnyy teamed up with Irina Khavronina after the 2023 Russian Championships.

=== 2023–24 season ===
On January 17, 2023, Khavronina/Naryzhnyy took to the ice for their first training session led by their new coaches Denis Samokhin and Maria Borovikova. Samokhin commented: "They look good [together], they are two very capable, technically sound athletes, they are well suited to each other. The couple hoped to perform at the Russian Challenge show program tournament on March 18 and prepared a gala number but they were not selected as participants. Coach Maria Borovikova stated that Khavronina/Naryzhnyy didn't even get to perform their gala program at the casting as there was no casting before the tournament. She also complemented the couple on their progress adding: "They have a good sense of what they are doing. Their stylish performance adds chic to the program".

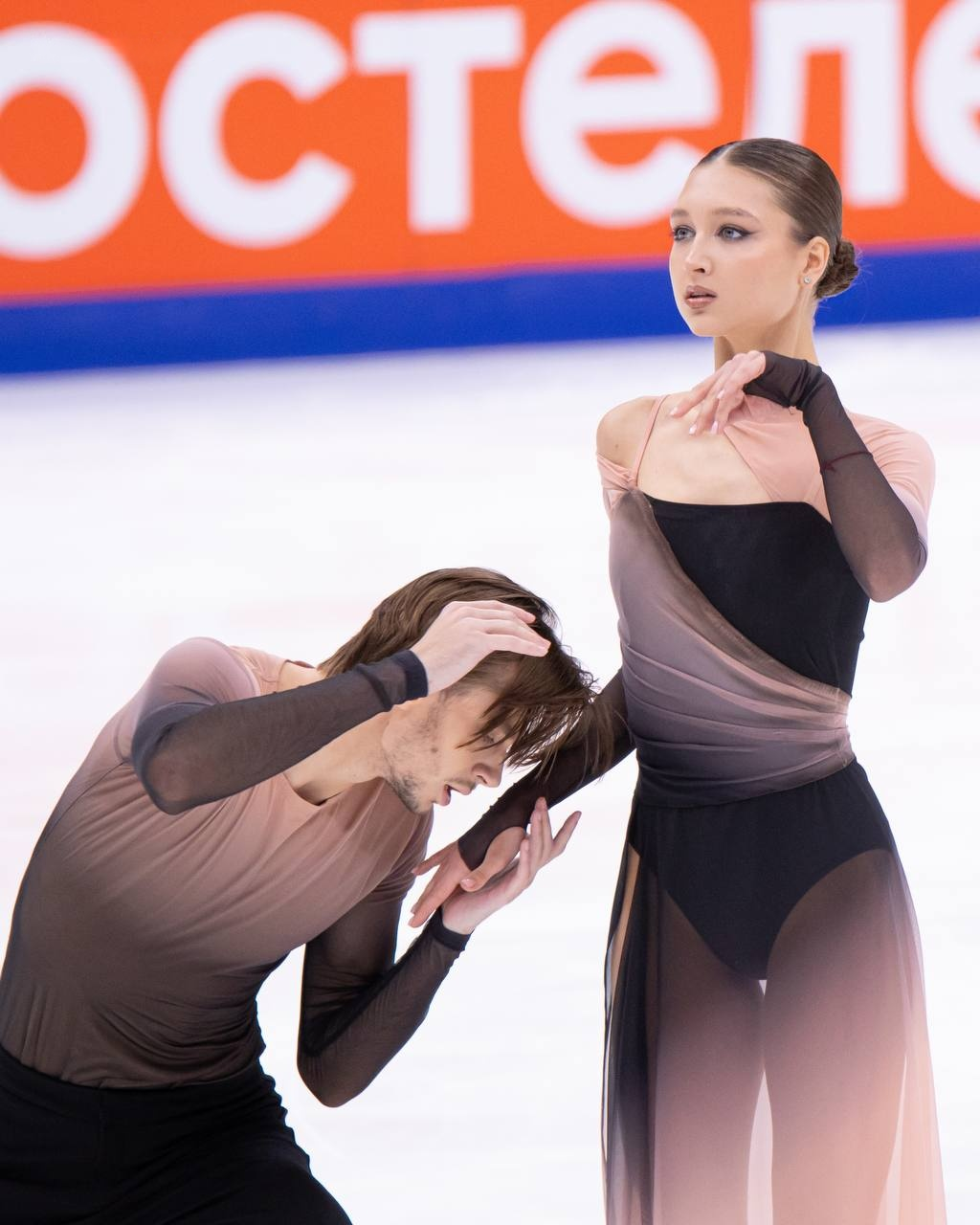
Khavronina/Naryzhnyy performing their free dance at the 2023 Russian Test Skates

Khavronina/Naryzhnyy's first performance as a new couple took place on May 4 in Ilia Averbukh's show in Moscow. They skated to "Oh, the Roads…" and performed in several group numbers. They also performed on May 7 in the same show in Saint-Petersburg. Naryzhnyy later described his emotions during their first performance as "being calm" and Khavronina stated she had been looking forward to it: "I really wanted to capture it in my memory, every second, because I felt that moment deeply. When we left the ice after our performance, we hugged. It was touching, atmospheric. To me, it was unforgettable."

The couple presented their competitive programs at the Russian Test Skates in September 2023. They skated to Michael Jackson's songs in the rhythm dance and to a medley of Power-Haus tracks in their free dance. On finishing their free program, Khavronina became emotional and later said the preparation for the test skates was difficult for her: “I was very nervous during the test skates. I really wanted us to show our best both to the judges and the audience. I was worried about how they would accept us, there was pressure”.

When commenting on their choice of music, Naryzhnyy said he had long wanted to skate to Michael Jackson's songs and suggested this option to their team. The couple added their free dance was about love, relationships and difficulties that they were overcoming together.

Khavronina/Naryzhnyy started their competitive season by winning gold at the 2023 Nikolai Panin-Kolomenkin Memorial. They earned a solid score of 80.76 for their rhythm dance and 115.84 for their free dance with a one-point deduction for their choreographic sliding movement.

They improved their free dance and total scores at their next competition, “Quray” of the Russian Grand Prix series. They won silver behind Elizaveta Khudaiberdieva/Egor Bazin who placed first. At the ‘Volga Pirouette’ Grand Prix tournament Khavronina/Naryzhnyy won another silver medal scoring their season's best in the free dance.

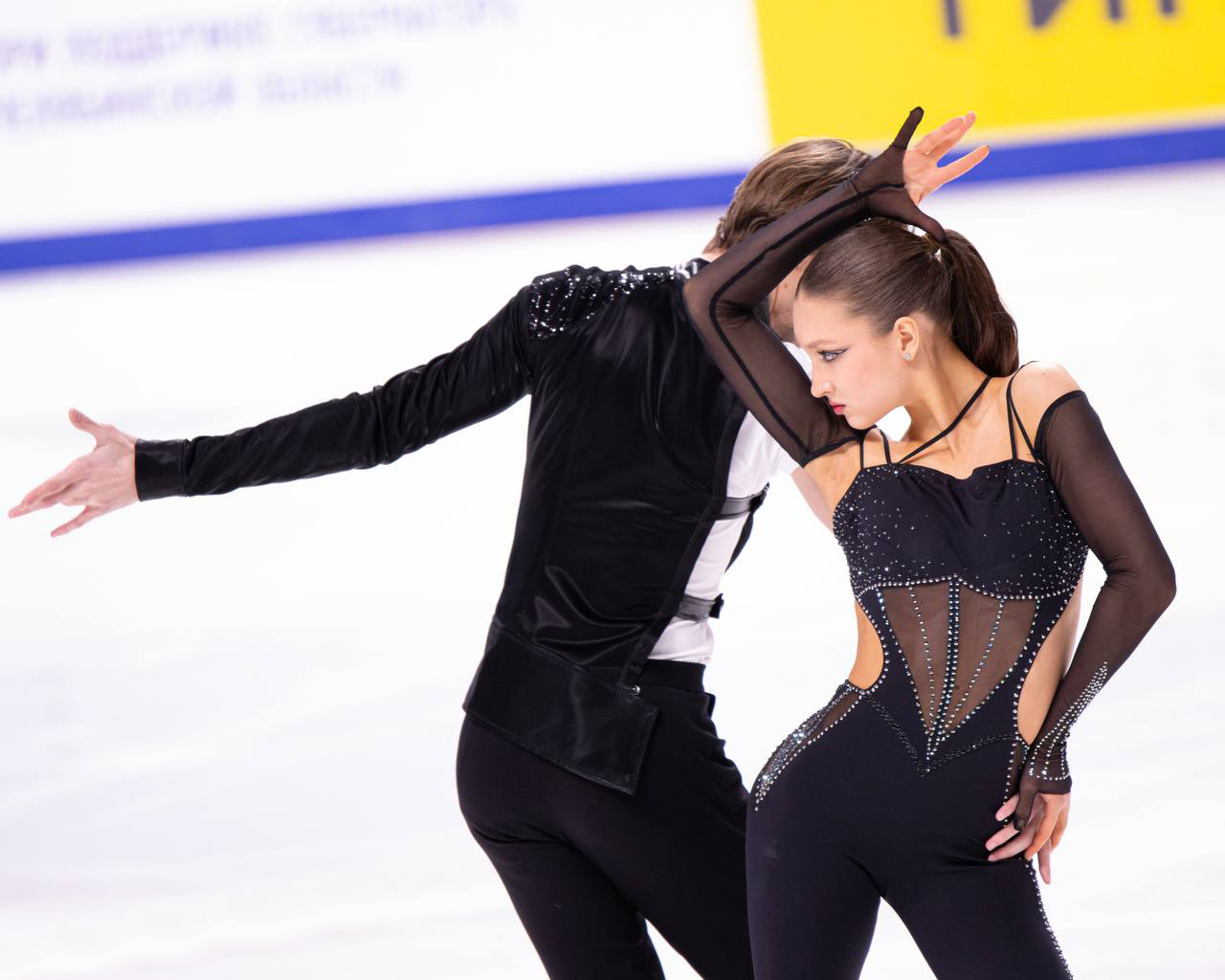
Khavronina/Naryzhnyy performing in the rhythm dance at the 2024 Russian Nationals

At the 2024 Russian Figure Skating Championships Khavronina/Naryzhnyy placed 5th in the rhythm dance due to a mistake on synchronized twizzles. They, however, scored their season's best in the free dance placing second in the segment and winning the bronze medal at their first Russian Nationals.

After the championship Khavronina stated that this time she prepared for the tournament calmly and wasn't nervous at all. Naryzhnyy, on the other hand, said preparing for the Nationals was hard as he was anxious to show everything they could do in training.

The couple's next tournament was the 2024 All-Russia Spartakiad in February where they earned their best scores of the season in both segments and won the bronze medal behind Khudaiberdieva/Bazin (silver) and Stepanova/Bukin (gold).

In March, they participated in the Channel One Trophy. They were on the White Team led by Olympic champion Alina Zagitova who acted as the team's captain.

=== 2024–2025 season ===
Khavronina/Naryzhnyy presented their new programs, albeit fragments, in August 2024 at an open training session led by their coaching team. They chose funk as the main rhythm for their rhythm dance to 'Get Up, I Feel Like Being A Sex Machine' by James Brown and 'Do You Love Me' by The Contours. The couple commented their program wasn't based on 'Dirty Dancing' or any other movie. “We just liked the music. First, we found the first piece, we really liked its rhythm, its mood. So, we’re just two people dancing at a disco”, said Khavronina.

The couple's coaches suggested ‘Following A Bird’ by Ezio Bosso and ‘Run’ by Ludovico Einaudi for their free dance. Coach Denis Samokhin's mother, Natalia Dubinskaya, had died earlier that year after struggling with motor neurone disease, a condition that Italian composer Ezio Bosso was diagnosed with in his early 40s. Khavronina and Naryzhnyy described their free dance as ‘life as it goes, a person’s struggle’. “This is something new for us”, stated Khavronina adding: “There is no love story or romantic feelings. It’s breathing, the desire to live”.

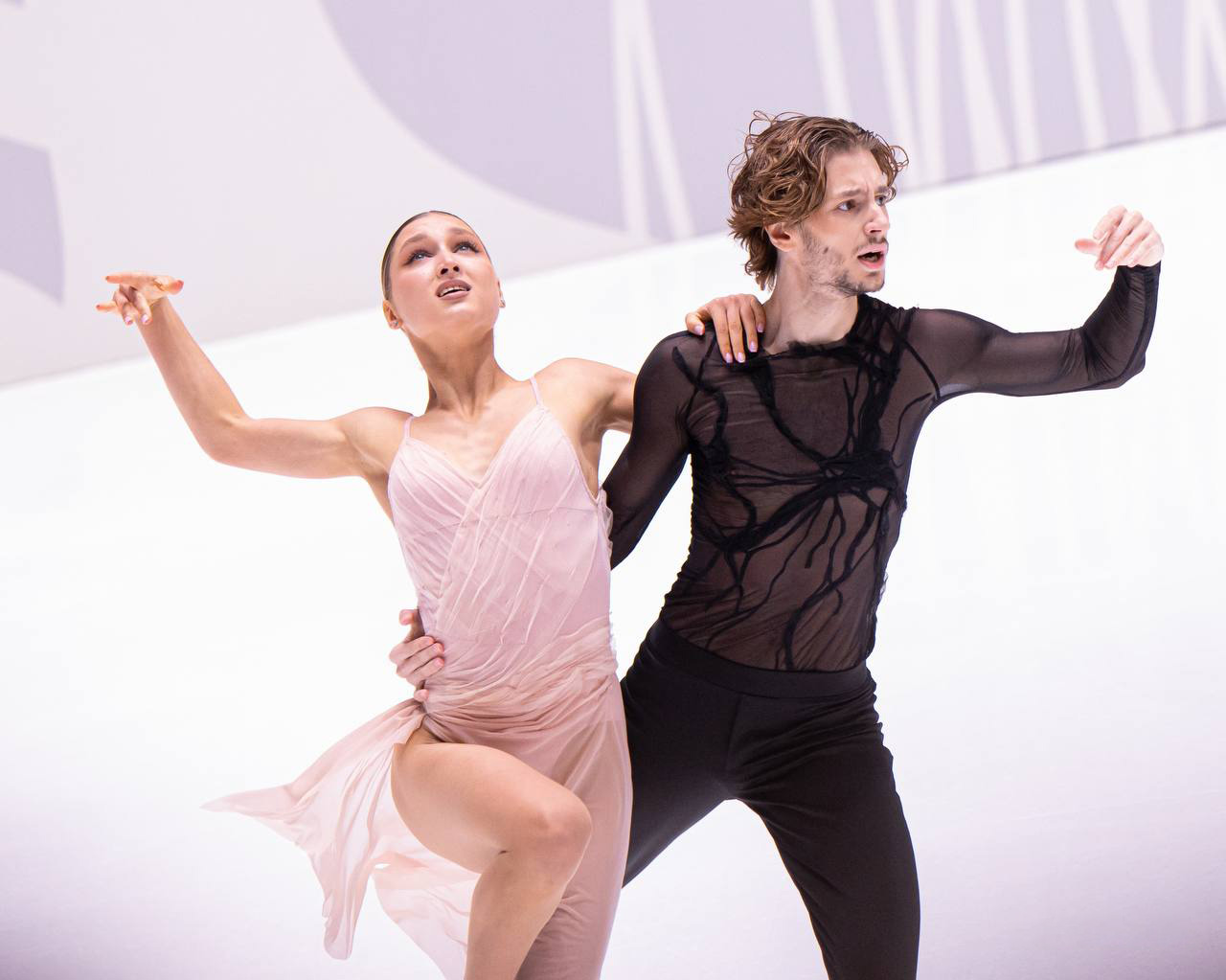
Khavronina/Naryzhnyy performing in the free dance at the 2024 Test Skates

After presenting their programs in full at the 2024 Russian Test skates, Khavronina/Naryzhnyy planned to start their season at the Nikolai Panin-Kolomenkin Memorial but had to withdraw due to minor health issues. Their first competition was a Russian Grand Prix event ‘Stars of Magnitka’ where they finished 2nd behind Stepanova/Bukin. Khavronina/Naryzhnyy's free dance score was only 0.98 points lower than that of Stepanova/Bukin with the total score difference between the two couples being 2,94.

At their next tournament, 'The Golden Skate' of the Russian Grand Prix in Moscow, Khavronina/Naryzhnyy won silver while Stepanova/Bukin again placed first. This time Stepanova/Bukin's total score was 7,8 points higher, but Khavronina/Naryzhnyy received better levels resulting in a higher base value score in both rhythm and free dance. They were also the only ice dance couple to be awarded a level 4 for their Pattern Dance Type Step Sequence in the rhythm dance.

After the tournament coach Denis Samokhin stated that Naryzhnyy had been skating with a knee injury and had had to undergo some treatment before the event. The team were looking forward to the Russian Nationals and planned to work on performance skills and speed in their programs.

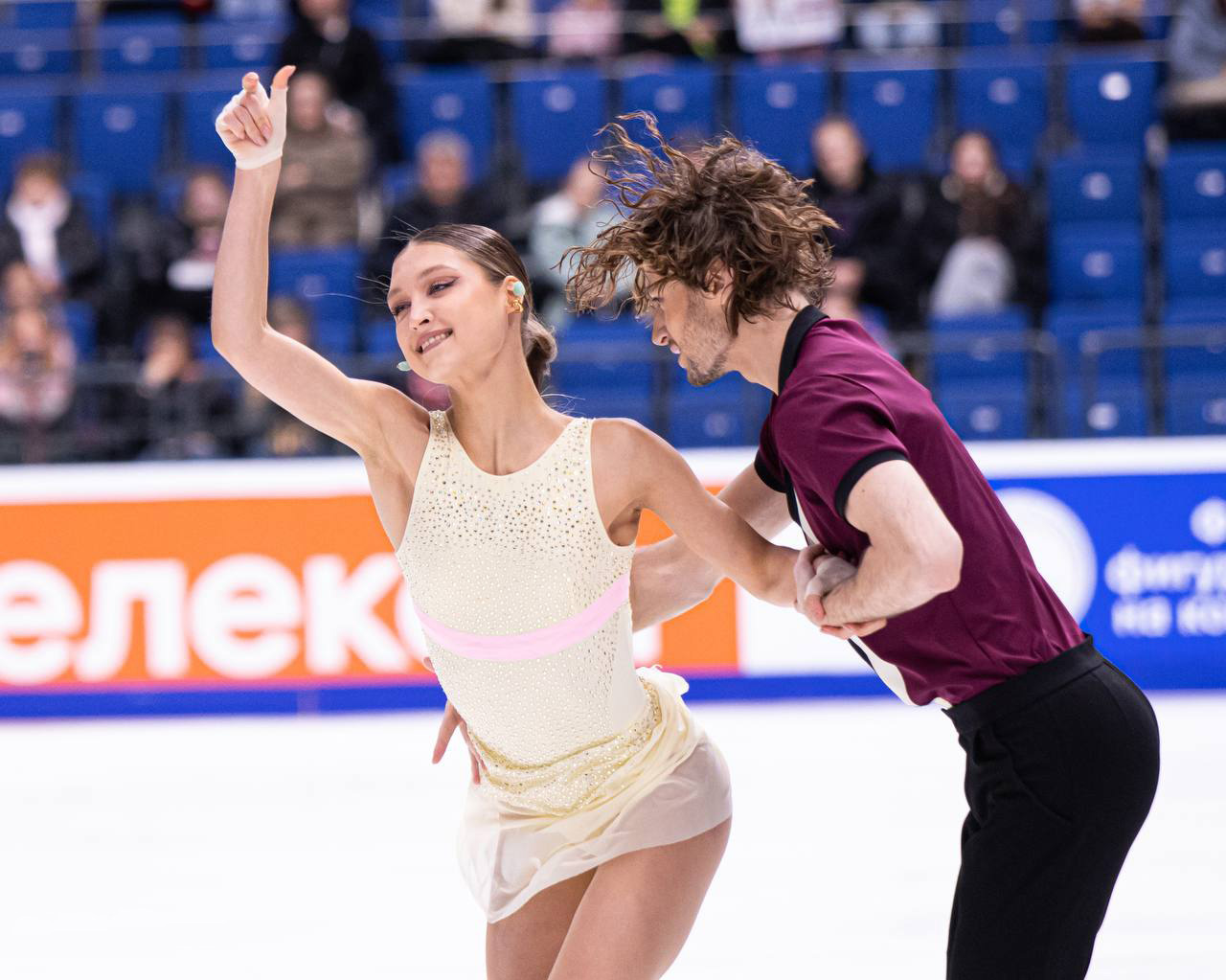
Khavronina/Naryzhnyy performing in the rhythm dance at the 2024 Golden Skate

At the 2025 Russian Figure Skating Championships Khavronina/Naryzhnyy improved their season's best in both segments, placing 2nd in the rhythm dance, 3rd in the free dance and winning the bronze medal. Their total score was only 0.45 points lower than that of Khudaiberdieva/Bazin who won silver. Khavronina/Naryzhnyy yet again received the highest base value score in both programs (with Stepanova/Bukin receiving an equal score in the free dance).

The couple had to withdraw from the gala, however, as Naryzhnyy had aggravated his injury. Soon after the Nationals coach Denis Samokhin announced that Naryzhnyy needed further treatment and the couple might finish their season early.

In January 2025 Naryzhnyy underwent knee surgery. “He had a damaged meniscus and a certain part of the cartilage”, Denis Samokhin explained. “It's not a big problem, but the damaged edge of the meniscus could affect the cartilage further - and that would be serious. During the surgery, they removed the damaged piece of the meniscus and cleaned the cartilage”. According to Samokhin, Naryzhnyy is recovering well and is expected to resume on-ice training in April 2025.

In June 2025 Khavronina/Naryzhnyy started training under Alexander Zhulin.

=== 2025–2026 season ===
In December 2025, Naryzhnyy underwent a second knee surgery. “The first procedure was a mosaic chondroplasty of the lateral femoral condyle. This time, it was just a chondroplasty of the patellar cartilage. They also cleaned up all the scar tissue from the previous operation performed on January 16”, Naryzhnyy stated. The pair did not compete during the 2025–26 season.

In April 2026, he began light on-ice training after his second surgery.

On 30 June 2026, the International Skating Union announced that figure skaters from Russia and Belarus would be allowed to compete at international competitions as Individual Neutral Athletes (AINs). Each of these skaters are required to undergo an individual assessment conducted by the ISU Council to determine whether they meet the criteria for neutral status. The team's application was approved, making them eligible to compete internationally as neutral athletes.

=== 2026–2027 season ===
Khavronina and Naryzhnyy opened the season by performing at the national team’s Test Skates. Olympic silver medalist in ice dance at the 2022 Winter Olympics Nikita Katsalapov also began working with the duo as a coach.

== Programs ==
=== With Khavronina ===
Season	Rhythm dance	Free dance	Exhibition
2026–2027	Maison - by Emilio Piano & Lucie; To Build a Home - by The Cinematic Orchestra	Obscurity; Sonder - by Lex Rukinov	
2025–2026			
2024–2025	Get Up, I Feel Like Being A Sex Machine by James Brown; Do You Love Me by The Contours	Following A Bird by Ezio Bosso; Run by Ludovico Einaudi	
2023–2024	The Way You Make Me Feel; Man In The Mirror; Beat It by Michael Jackson	Obscura; Iduna; Arena by Power-Haus ft. Christian Reindl & Lucie Paradis	It's a Man's Man's Man's World by Seal

=== With Morozov ===
Season	Rhythm dance	Free dance	Exhibition
2022–2023	I Like It by Cardi B, Bad Bunny and J Balvin; Eres Todo en Mí by Ana Gabriel; Mi Gente by J Balvin and Willy William	Moonlight Sonata by Ludwig van Beethoven (modern cover version)	

=== With Shanaeva ===
Season	Rhythm dance	Free dance	Exhibition
2021–2022	Hip Hop: Capim by Filo Machado; Blues: Legendary by Welshly Arms; Hip Hop: Freak (Remix) by DJ Fleek choreo. by Irina Zhuk	Amaluna by Guy Dubuc and Marc Lessard choreo. by Irina Zhuk	
2020–2021	Foxtrot: Bonnie and Clyde by Frank Wildhorn choreo. by Irina Zhuk	Amaluna by Guy Dubuc and Marc Lessard choreo. by Irina Zhuk	Umbrella by Ember Island; Umbrella by Rihanna, Jay-Z
2019–2020	Foxtrot: Bonnie and Clyde by Frank Wildhorn choreo. by Irina Zhuk	River by Bishop Briggs choreo. by Irina Zhuk	Come Together by Petra Magoni & Ferrucio Spinetti; Come Together by Gotthard
2018–2019	Tango: Tango D'Amor by Tango Jointz; Tango: María de Buenos Aires by Astor Piazzolla	Samson and Delilah by Camille Saint-Saëns choreo. by Irina Zhuk	
	Short dance		
2017–2018	Dirás Que Estoy Loco by Miguel Angel Muñoz M.A.M.; Pum Pum by DJ Maurice, Trafassi	Come Together by Petra Magoni & Ferrucio Spinetti; Come Together by Gotthard	
2016–2017	It Feels So Right by Elvis Presley	Scheherazade by Esquivel	

== Competitive highlights ==
GP: Grand Prix; CS: Challenger Series; JGP: Junior Grand Prix

=== Skating as an Individual Neutral Athlete ===
Competition placements at senior level
Season	2026–27
CS Denis Ten Memorial	4th
CS Nepela Memorial	7th

=== With Khavronina ===
National
Event	23–24	24–25
Russian Champ.	3rd	3rd
Russian Cup Final	3rd	
GPR Quray	2nd	
GPR Volga Pirouette	2nd	
GPR Stars of Magnitka		2nd
GPR Golden Skate		2nd
Panin-Kolomenkin Memorial	1st	
TBD = Assigned; WD = Withdrew

=== With Morozov ===
National
Event	22–23
Russian Champ.	WD
GPR Idel	1st
GPR Golden Skate	1st
TBD = Assigned; WD = Withdrew

=== With Shanaeva ===
International
Event	16–17	17–18	18–19	19–20	20–21	21–22
GP Skate Canada						9th
CS Golden Spin						3rd
CS Warsaw Cup						4th
Budapest Trophy						3rd
International: Junior
Junior Worlds				3rd		
JGP Final				3rd		
JGP Armenia			4th			
JGP France				1st		
JGP Russia				1st		
JGP Slovakia			2nd			
Ice Star	9th					
Santa Claus Cup		1st				
Volvo Open Cup			2nd			
GP Bratislava			1st			
National
Russian Champ.						5th
Russian Junior		12th	4th	1st	2nd	
Russian Youth, Elder	3rd					
TBD = Assigned; WD = Withdrew

=== With Chekmeneva ===
National
Event	14–15	15–16
Russian Youth Champ., Elder	10th	
Moscow Youth Champ., Elder	7th	
Open Moscow Youth Champ.	15th	9th

== Detailed results ==
Small medals awarded only at ISU Championships. ISU personal bests highlighted in bold.

=== With Khavronina ===
Results in the 2026–27 season
Date	Event	SP		FS		Total	
Date	Event	P	Score	P	Score	P	Score
Sep 24–27, 2026	(Slovakia) 2026 CS Nepela Memorial	7	73.78	7	104.55	7	177.93

=== Skating for Russia ===
==== Senior results ====
**2021–22 season**
Date	Event	RD	FD	Total
21–26 December 2021	2022 Russian Championships	8; 74.83	5; 112.36	5; 187.19
7–11 December 2021	2021 CS Golden Spin of Zagreb	3; 70.59	2; 107.24	3; 177.83
17–20 November 2021	2021 CS Warsaw Cup	4; **73.55**	4; **110.88**	4; **184.43**
29–31 October 2021	2021 Skate Canada International	9; 68.53	10; 92.13	9; 160.66
14–17 October 2021	2021 Budapest Trophy	3; 69.55	3; 105.35	3; 174.90

==== Junior results ====
**2020–21 season**
Date	Event	RD	FD	Total
1–5 February 2021	2021 Russian Junior Championships	3; 73.75	2; 110.44	2; 184.19
**2019–20 season**
Date	Event	RD	FD	Total
2–8 March 2020	2020 World Junior Championships	1; 70.03	3; 105.14	3; 175.17
4–8 February 2020	2020 Russian Junior Championships	2; 71.24	1; 110.85	1; 182.09
5–8 December 2019	2019-20 Junior Grand Prix Final	3; 66.21	3; 98.01	3; 164.22
11–14 September 2019	2019 JGP Russia	1; 67.70	1; 103.37	1; 171.07
21–24 August 2019	2019 JGP France	2; 63.76	1; 100.14	1; 163.90
**2018–19 season**
Date	Event	RD	FD	Total
31 January – 4 February 2019	2019 Russian Figure Skating Championships	5; 64.20	4; 102.89	4; 167.09
12–14 December 2018	2018 Grand Prix of Bratislava	1; 63.58	1; 96.45	1; 160.03
6–11 November 2018	2018 Volvo Open Cup	2; 63.77	2; 95.67	2; 159.44
10–13 October 2018	2018 JGP Armenia	5; 51.81	3; 92.33	4; 148.14
22–25 September 2018	2018 JGP Slovakia	2; 60.30	2; 91.91	2; 152.21
**2017–18 season**
Date	Event	SD	FD	Total
23–26 January 2018	2018 Russian Figure Skating Championships	14; 51.77	12; 75.16	12; 126.93
4–10 December 2017	2017 Santa Claus Cup	2; 53.72	1; 76.61	1; 130.33
**2016–17 season**
Date	Event	SD	FD	Total
18–20 November 2016	2016 Ice Star	10; 50.31	9; 72.30	9; 122.61
