= Elizaveta Shanaeva =

Russian figure skater (born 2003)

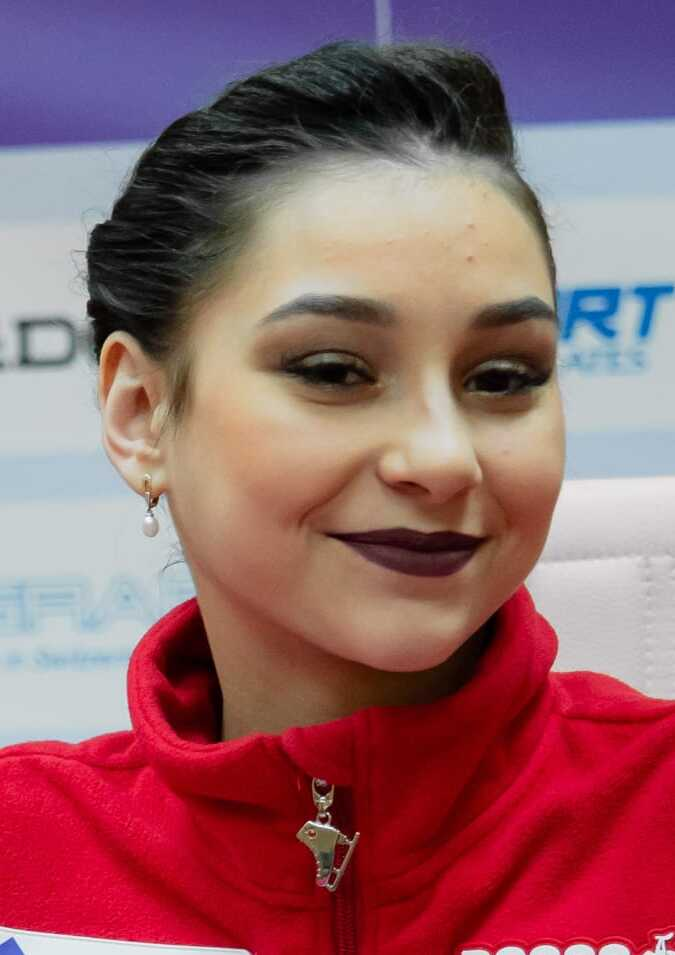
- Shanaeva in 2020

Personal information
- Native name: Елизавета Тамерлановна Шанаева
- Full name: Elizaveta Tamerlanovna Shanaeva
- Born: 30 May 2003 (age 23) Alania, Russia
- Height: 1.70 m (5 ft 7 in)

Figure skating career
- Country: Russia
- Coach: Alexander Zhulin, Petr Durnev, Sergei Petushkov
- Skating club: UOR 4 Moscow
- Began skating: 2005
Medal record
Representing Russia
Figure skating: Ice dancing
World Junior Championships
Bronze medal – third place	2020 Tallinn	Ice dancing
Junior Grand Prix Final
Bronze medal – third place	2019–20 Turin	Ice dancing

Elizaveta Tamerlanovna Shanaeva (Russian: Елизавета Тамерлановна Шанаева, born 30 May 2003) is a Russian competitive ice dancer. With her former skating partner, Devid Naryzhnyy, she is the 2020 World Junior bronze medalist and the 2019–20 Junior Grand Prix Final bronze medalist. She has also won three medals on the ISU Junior Grand Prix series, including gold medals at 2019 France and 2019 Russia.

== Personal life ==
Elizaveta Tamerlanovna Shanaeva was born on 30 May 2003 in Alania, Russia.

== Career ==
=== Early years ===
Shanaeva began learning to skate in 2005. She skated with Sergei Semko before teaming up with Devid Naryzhnyy during the 2016–2017 season. They are coached by Irina Zhuk and Alexander Svinin.

Shanaeva/Naryzhnyy placed first at the 2017 Moscow Championship.

=== 2018–2019 season ===
Shanaeva/Naryzhnyy received their first ISU Junior Grand Prix (JGP) assignments in the 2018–2019 season. They won silver medals at 2018 JGP event in Bratislava, Slovakia, and placed 4th at 2018 JGP event in Yerevan, Armenia.

In November 2018, they won the junior gold medal at the 2018 Grand Prix of Bratislava. They placed fourth at the 2019 Russian Junior Championships.

=== 2019–2020 season ===
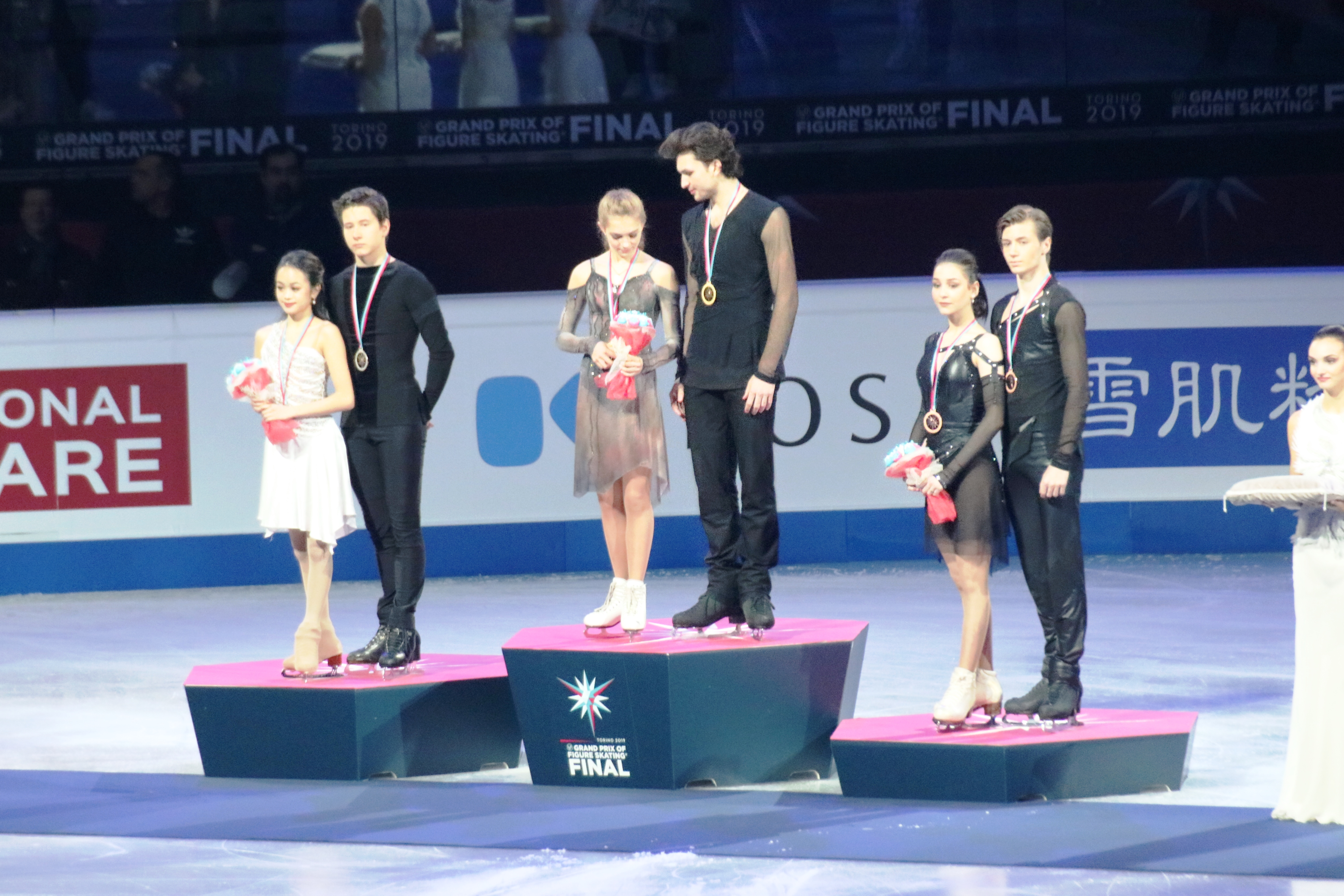
Shanaeva and Naryzhnyy at the 2019-2020 ISU Junior Grand Prix Final (on the right)

Returning to the Junior Grand Prix, Shanaeva/Naryzhnyy won their first JGP gold medal in September at the 2019 JGP France in Courchevel. Three weeks later, they won a second gold medal at the 2019 JGP Russia in Chelyabinsk. With these results, they qualified for the 2019–20 ISU Junior Grand Prix Final in Turin. Shanaeva/Naryzhnyy placed third in the rhythm dance there, with her describing them as "quite happy" with their performance. They were also third in the free dance, despite Naryzhnyy missing a twizzle level, and won the bronze medal.

After winning the junior national title at the 2020 Russian Junior Championships, Shanaeva/Naryzhnyy were assigned to compete at the 2020 World Junior Championships in Tallinn, Estonia. First in the free dance, they won a small gold medal for the segment, becoming the only team to score above 70 points in the junior rhythm dance that season. Third in the free dance, they dropped to third place overall and won the bronze medal. Shanaeva said, "we got a lot of energy to show our maximum next season and to be ready to beat everyone."

=== 2020–2021 season ===
After junior Russian test skates in August, both became ill with COVID-19, first Shanaeva and then Naryzhnyy. This caused them to miss the first half of the season, competing only in December, on the fifth stage of the domestic Cup of Russia series, but having to withdraw after the rhythm dance due to Naryzhnyy getting food poisoned.

At the beginning of February, they competed on the 2021 Russian Junior Championships in Krasnoyarsk, placing third in the rhythm dance, second in the free dance and second overall. They claimed to be happy with their performances after such a difficult period, defining their result as a "silver medal with a golden shine."

They were scheduled to participate in the Russian Cup Final in Moscow but withdrew for medical reasons. On the 17 and 18 of April, they performed in Team Tutberidze’s show Champions on Ice in Krasnodar and Sochi.

=== 2021–2022 season ===
Moving to the international senior level, Shanaeva/Naryzhnyy won the bronze medal at the Budapest Trophy. They went on to make their senior Grand Prix debut at the 2021 Skate Canada International, where they finished in ninth place.

In December, Shanaeva/Naryzhnyy competed on the 2022 Russian Championship in Saint Petersburg, placing eighth in the rhythm dance and fifth in the free dance and finishing fifth overall.

== Programs ==
=== With Drozd ===
Season	Rhythm dance	Free dance	Exhibition
2022–2023	Havana 1957 by Orishas	Scheherazade (by; Rimsky-Korsaov)	

=== With Naryzhnyy ===
Season	Rhythm dance	Free dance	Exhibition
2021–2022	Hip Hop: Capim by Filo Machado; Blues: Legendary by Welshly Arms; Hip Hop: Freak (Remix) by DJ Fleek choreo. by Irina Zhuk	Amaluna by Guy Dubuc and Marc Lessard choreo. by Irina Zhuk	Umbrella by Ember Island; Umbrella by Rihanna, Jay-Z
2020–2021	Foxtrot: Bonnie and Clyde by Frank Wildhorn choreo. by Irina Zhuk	Amaluna by Guy Dubuc and Marc Lessard choreo. by Irina Zhuk	Umbrella by Ember Island; Umbrella by Rihanna, Jay-Z
2019–2020	Foxtrot: Bonnie and Clyde by Frank Wildhorn choreo. by Irina Zhuk	River by Bishop Briggs choreo. by Irina Zhuk	Come Together by Petra Magoni & Ferrucio Spinetti; Come Together by Gotthard
2018–2019	Tango: Tango D’Amor by Tango Jointz; Tango: María de Buenos Aires by Astor Piazzolla	Samson and Delilah by Camille Saint-Saëns choreo. by Irina Zhuk	
	Short dance		
2017–2018	Dirás Que Estoy Loco by Miguel Angel Muñoz M.A.M.; Pum Pum by DJ Maurice, Trafassi	Come Together by Petra Magoni & Ferrucio Spinetti; Come Together by Gotthard	
2016–2017	It Feels So Right by Elvis Presley	Scheherazade by Esquivel	

== Competitive highlights ==
GP: Grand Prix; CS: Challenger Series; JGP: Junior Grand Prix

=== With Drozd ===
National
Event	22–23	23–24
Russian Champ.	2nd	4th
Russian Cup Final (Note: The 2023 Russian Cup Final was renamed as the 2023 Russian Grand Prix Final.)	2nd	5th
GPR Golden Sate		2nd
GPR Idel	2nd	
GPR Krasnoyarye		2nd
GPR Volga Pirouette	2nd	

=== With Naryzhnyy ===
International
Event	16–17	17–18	18–19	19–20	20–21	21–22
GP Skate Canada						9th
CS Golden Spin						3rd
CS Warsaw Cup						4th
Budapest Trophy						3rd
International: Junior
Junior Worlds				3rd		
JGP Final				3rd		
JGP Armenia			4th			
JGP France				1st		
JGP Russia				1st		
JGP Slovakia			2nd			
Ice Star	9th					
Santa Claus Cup		1st				
Volvo Open Cup			2nd			
GP Bratislava			1st			
National
Russian Champ.						5th
Russian Junior		12th	4th	1st	2nd	
Russian Youth, Elder	3rd					
TBD = Assigned; WD = Withdrew

=== With Semko ===
International: Advanced novice
Event	2014–15	2015–16
NRW Trophy	1st	
National
Moscow Youth Champ., Elder		8th

== Detailed results ==
Small medals awarded only at ISU Championships. ISU personal bests highlighted in bold.

=== With Naryzhnyy ===
==== Senior results ====
**2021–22 season**
Date	Event	RD	FD	Total
21–26 December 2021	2022 Russian Championships	8; 74.83	5; 112.36	5; 187.19
7–11 December 2021	2021 CS Golden Spin of Zagreb	3; 70.59	2; 107.24	3; 177.83
17–20 November 2021	2021 CS Warsaw Cup	4; **73.55**	4; **110.88**	4; **184.43**
29–31 October 2021	2021 Skate Canada International	9; 68.53	10; 92.13	9; 160.66
14–17 October 2021	2021 Budapest Trophy	3; 69.55	3; 105.35	3; 174.90

==== Junior results ====
**2020–21 season**
Date	Event	RD	FD	Total
1–5 February 2021	2021 Russian Junior Championships	3; 73.75	2; 110.44	2; 184.19
**2019–20 season**
Date	Event	RD	FD	Total
2–8 March 2020	2020 World Junior Championships	1; 70.03	3; 105.14	3; 175.17
4–8 February 2020	2020 Russian Junior Championships	2; 71.24	1; 110.85	1; 182.09
5–8 December 2019	2019–20 Junior Grand Prix Final	3; 66.21	3; 98.01	3; 164.22
11–14 September 2019	2019 JGP Russia	1; 67.70	1; 103.37	1; 171.07
21–24 August 2019	2019 JGP France	2; 63.76	1; 100.14	1; 163.90
**2018–19 season**
Date	Event	RD	FD	Total
31 January – 4 February 2019	2019 Russian Figure Skating Championships	5; 64.20	4; 102.89	4; 167.09
12–14 December 2018	2018 Grand Prix of Bratislava	1; 63.58	1; 96.45	1; 160.03
6–11 November 2018	2018 Volvo Open Cup	2; 63.77	2; 95.67	2; 159.44
10–13 October 2018	2018 JGP Armenia	5; 55.81	3; 92.33	4; 148.14
22–25 September 2018	2018 JGP Slovakia	2; 60.30	2; 91.91	2; 152.21
**2017–18 season**
Date	Event	SD	FD	Total
23–26 January 2018	2018 Russian Figure Skating Championships	14; 51.77	12; 75.16	12; 126.93
4–10 December 2017	2017 Santa Claus Cup	2; 53.72	1; 76.61	1; 130.33
**2016–17 season**
Date	Event	SD	FD	Total
18–20 November 2016	2016 Ice Star	10; 50.31	9; 72.30	9; 122.61
