= Daria Morozova =

Russian ice dancer

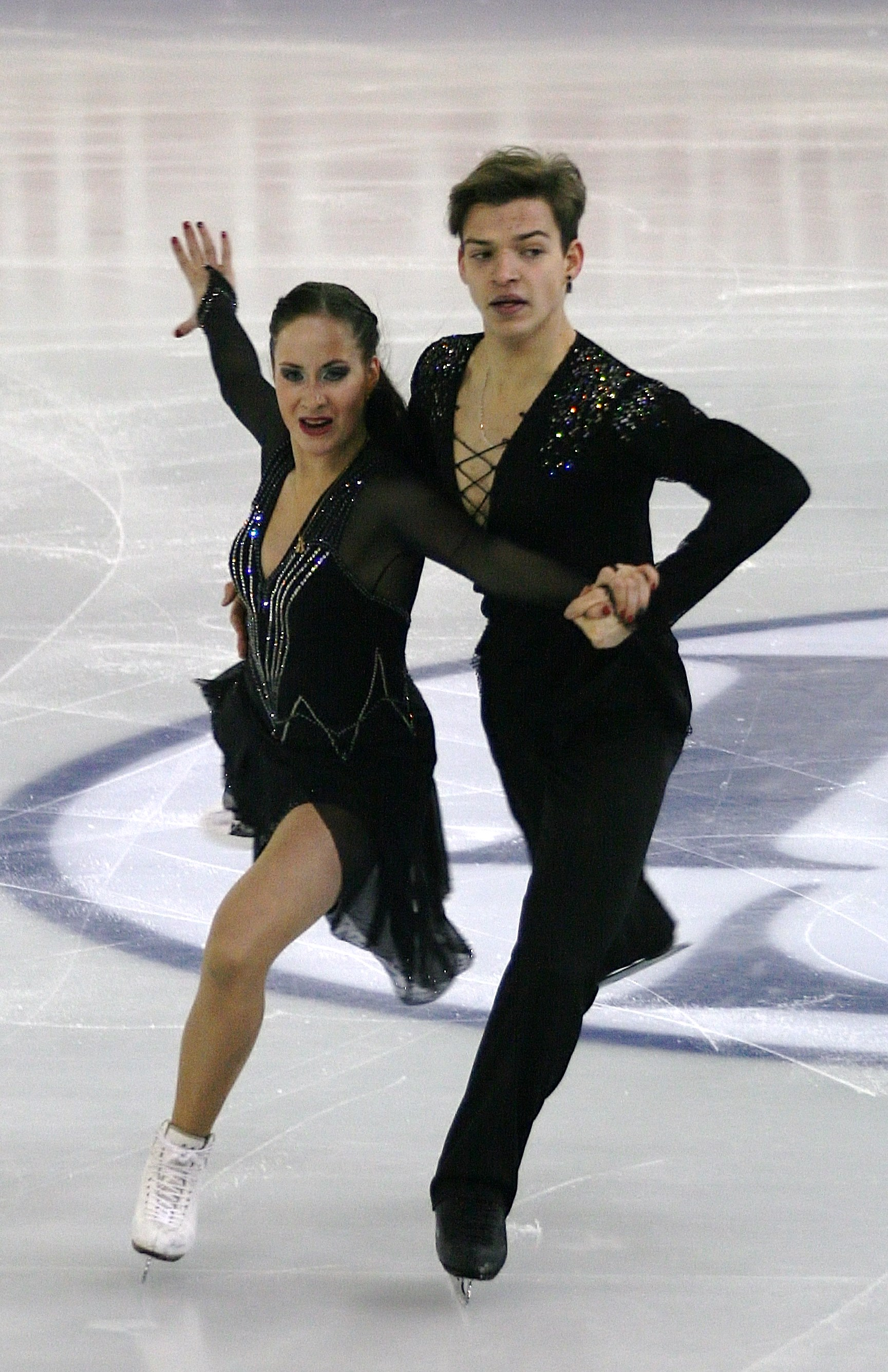
- Morozova/Zhirnov in December 2014

Personal information
- Native name: Дарья Владимировна Морозова
- Full name: Daria Vladimirovna Morozova
- Born: 22 January 1997 (age 29) Moscow, Russia
- Height: 1.65 m (5 ft 5 in)

Figure skating career
- Country: Russia
- Skating club: UOR 4
- Began skating: 2001

Daria Vladimirovna Morozova (Russian: Дарья Владимировна Морозова; born in Moscow 22 January 1997) is a Russian competitive ice dancer. With former partner Mikhail Zhirnov, she is the 2014 JGP Slovenia champion.

== Career ==
Morozova started skating in 2001. She began competing with Mikhail Zhirnov in the 2008–09 season. The two were coached by Svetlana Liapina before they switched to Alexander Svinin and Irina Zhuk.

Representing Russia, Morozova/Zhirnov made their junior international debut in November 2010 at the NRW Trophy. In September 2011, they placed fifth at their first ISU Junior Grand Prix (JGP) assignment, in Riga, Latvia. In the 2012–13 JGP season, they ranked fourth in Lake Placid, New York, before winning bronze in Chemnitz, Germany. They finished fourth at the 2013 Russian Junior Championships.

Morozova/Zhirnov took bronze at both of their 2013–14 JGP events, in Minsk, Belarus, and Tallinn, Estonia, and came in sixth at the 2014 Russian Junior Championships.

Their first assignment of the 2014–15 JGP series took place in Ljubljana, Slovenia. Placing first in the short dance and third in the free dance, they won the gold medal by a margin of 0.24 over Canada's Brianna Delmaestro / Timothy Lum. They placed fourth at the JGP in Zagreb, Croatia and qualified for the ISU Junior Grand Prix Final, where they finished sixth. After withdrawing from the 2015 Russian Junior Championships, Morozova/Zhirnov ended their partnership.

== Programs ==
(with Zhirnov)

Season	Short dance	Free dance
2014–15	Samba: Pum Pum (Sexy Body); Rhumba: Boom Boom Ba; Samba:	Asturias (Leyenda) (from Mirrors (film)) by Isaac Albéniz, Javier Navarrete; Pan's Labyrinth Lullaby (from Pan's Labyrinth) by Javier Navarrete
2013–14	Quickstep: Umbrella; Foxtrot: I Can't Dance	Tango Princesse by Julie Zenatti
2012–13	Swing: Blues: Swing:	Tristan & Iseult by Maxime Rodriguez
2011–12	Cha Cha: Angelina by ?	Flamenco by ?

== Competitive highlights ==
JGP: Junior Grand Prix

With Zhirnov

International
Event	10–11	11–12	12–13	13–14	14–15
JGP Final					6th
JGP Belarus				3rd	
JGP Croatia					4th
JGP Estonia				3rd	
JGP Germany			3rd		
JGP Latvia		5th			
JGP Slovenia					1st
JGP United States			4th		
Bavarian Open			2nd J	1st J	
Mont Blanc Trophy	1st J				
NRW Trophy	5th J				
Pavel Roman Memorial	5th J				
National
Russian Jr. Champ.	10th	9th	4th	6th	WD
J = Junior level; WD = Withdrew
