= Mikhail Zhirnov =

Russian competitive ice dancer (born 1994)

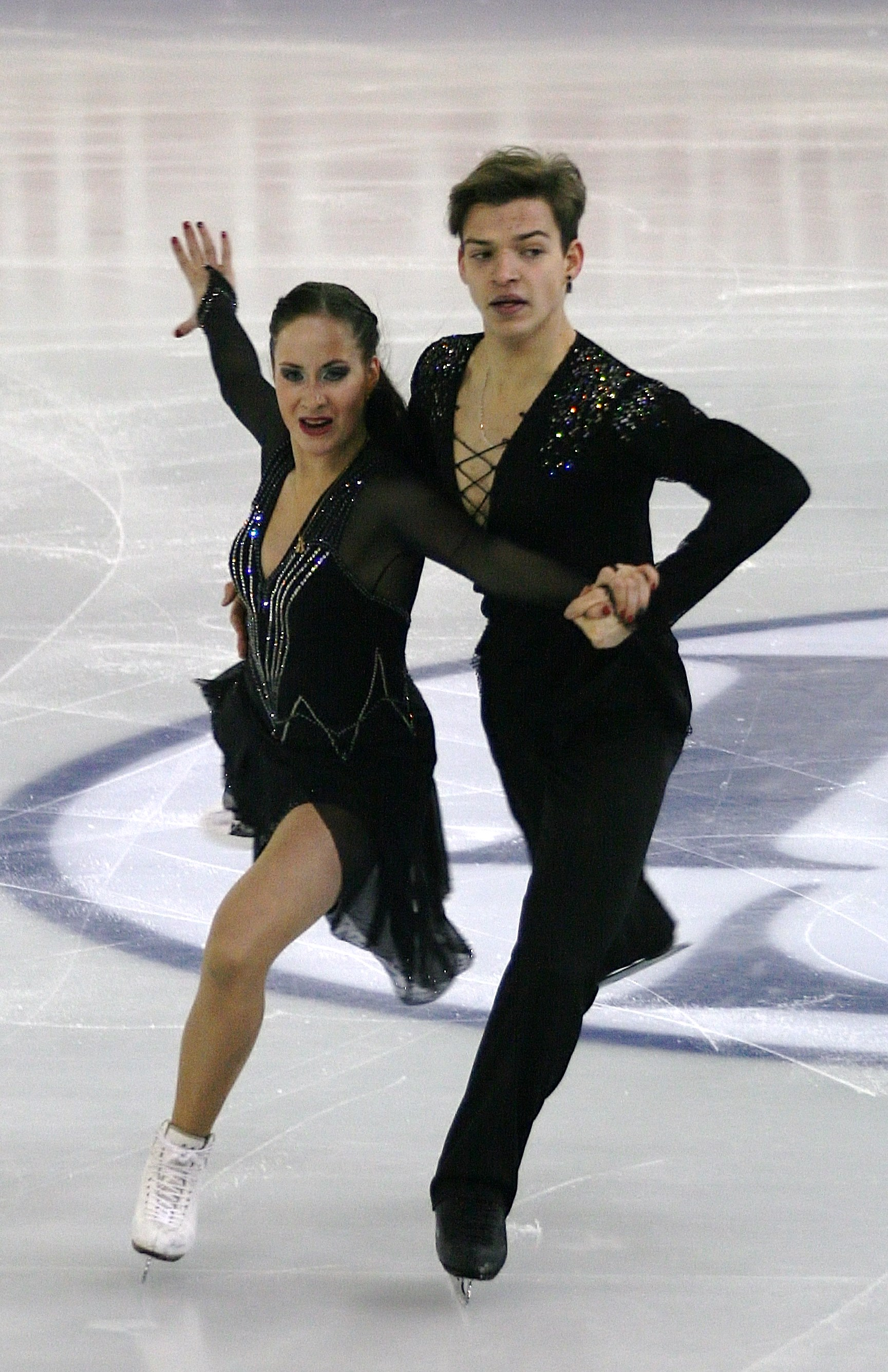
- Morozova/Zhirnov in December 2014

Personal information
- Native name: Михаил Петрович Жирнов
- Full name: Mikhail Petrovich Zhirnov
- Born: 8 November 1994 (age 31) Zheleznodorozhny, Moscow Oblast, Russia
- Height: 1.78 m (5 ft 10 in)

Figure skating career
- Country: Azerbaijan
- Partner: Varvara Oglobina
- Coach: Alexander Svinin, Irina Zhuk
- Skating club: UOR 4
- Began skating: 1999

Mikhail Petrovich Zhirnov (Russian: Михаил Петрович Жирнов, born 8 November 1994) is a Russian competitive ice dancer. With former partner Daria Morozova, he is the 2014 JGP Slovenia champion.

== Personal life ==
Mikhail Petrovich Zhirnov was born 8 November 1994 in Zheleznodorozhny, Moscow Oblast.

== Career ==
Zhirnov started skating in 1999.

=== Partnership with Morozova ===
Zhirnov began competing with Daria Morozova in the 2008–09 season. The two were coached by Svetlana Liapina before they switched to Alexander Svinin and Irina Zhuk.

Representing Russia, Morozova/Zhirnov made their junior international debut in November 2010 at the NRW Trophy. In September 2011, they placed fifth at their first ISU Junior Grand Prix (JGP) assignment, in Riga, Latvia. In the 2012–13 JGP season, they ranked fourth in Lake Placid, New York, before winning bronze in Chemnitz, Germany. They finished fourth at the 2013 Russian Junior Championships.

Morozova/Zhirnov took bronze at both of their 2013–14 JGP events, in Minsk, Belarus and Tallinn, Estonia, and came in sixth at the 2014 Russian Junior Championships.

Their first assignment of the 2014–15 JGP series took place in Ljubljana, Slovenia. Placing first in the short dance and third in the free dance, they won the gold medal by a margin of 0.24 over Canada's Brianna Delmaestro / Timothy Lum. They placed fourth at the JGP in Zagreb, Croatia and qualified for the ISU Junior Grand Prix Final, where they finished sixth. After withdrawing from the 2015 Russian Junior Championships, Morozova/Zhirnov ended their partnership.

=== Later career ===
In the 2015–16 season, Zhirnov began competing with Varvara Oglobina for Azerbaijan.

== Programs ==
With Morozova

Season	Short dance	Free dance
2014–15	Samba: Pum Pum (Sexy Body); Rhumba: Boom Boom Ba; Samba:	Asturias (Leyenda) (from Mirrors (film)) by Isaac Albéniz, Javier Navarrete; Pan's Labyrinth Lullaby (from Pan's Labyrinth) by Javier Navarrete
2013–14	Quickstep: Umbrella; Foxtrot: I Can't Dance	Tango Princesse by Julie Zenatti
2012–13	Swing: Blues: Swing:	Tristan & Iseult by Maxime Rodriguez
2011–12	Cha Cha: Angelina by ?	Flamenco by ?

== Competitive highlights ==
CS: Challenger Series; JGP: Junior Grand Prix

=== With Oglobina for Azerbaijan ===
International
Event	2015–16	2016–17
European Champ.		24th
CS Tallinn Trophy		WD
Bavarian Open	12th	
Volvo Open Cup		3rd

=== With Morozova for Russia ===
International
Event	10–11	11–12	12–13	13–14	14–15
JGP Final					6th
JGP Belarus				3rd	
JGP Croatia					4th
JGP Estonia				3rd	
JGP Germany			3rd		
JGP Latvia		5th			
JGP Slovenia					1st
JGP United States			4th		
Bavarian Open			2nd J	1st J	
Mont Blanc Trophy	1st J				
NRW Trophy	5th J				
Pavel Roman Memorial	5th J				
National
Russian Jr. Champ.	10th	9th	4th	6th	WD
J = Junior level; WD = Withdrew
