= Irina Zhuk =

Russian ice dancing coach and a former competitor

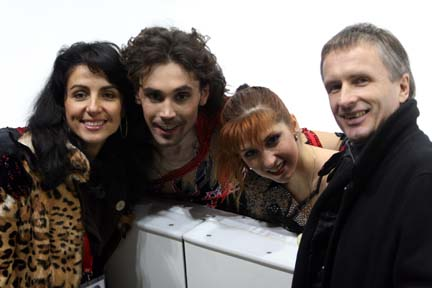
- Zhuk (far left) with Khokhlova, Novitski and Svinin

Personal information
- Full name: Irina Vladimirovna Zhuk
- Born: 3 December 1966 (age 59) Kharkiv, Ukrainian SSR, Soviet Union

Irina Vladimirovna Zhuk (Russian: Ирина Владимировна Жук; born 3 December 1966) is a Russian ice dancing coach and a former competitor for the Soviet Union. With Oleg Petrov, she is the 1985 Skate America silver medalist.

== Personal life ==
Irina Vladimirovna Zhuk was born on 3 December 1966 in Kharkiv, Ukrainian SSR, Soviet Union. She is married to former Soviet ice dancer Alexander Svinin.

== Career ==
Zhuk competed with Oleg Petrov for the Soviet Union. Together, they won gold at the 1984 Grand Prix International St. Gervais, silver at the 1984 Nebelhorn Trophy, and silver at the 1985 Skate America. After retiring from competition, they performed in ice shows in England and the United States.

In collaboration with Alexander Svinin, Zhuk began working as a coach and choreographer at Moscow's Sokolniki ice rink. In 2010, they accepted an offer to move to a new rink, Mechta in the Bibirevo District of Moscow.

Zhuk and Svinin's current students include:

- Alexandra Stepanova / Ivan Bukin
- Sofia Shevchenko / Igor Eremenko
- Elizaveta Shanaeva / Devid Naryzhnyy
- Sofya Leonteva / Daniil Gorelkin

Their former students include:

- Rebeka Kim / Kirill Minov
- Jana Khokhlova / Sergei Novitski
- Daria Morozova / Mikhail Zhirnov
- Ekaterina Rubleva / Ivan Shefer
- Ekaterina Pushkash / Jonathan Guerreiro (May 2009 – spring 2010)
- Anastasia Shpilevaya / Grigory Smirnov
- Valeria Starygina / Ivan Volobuiev
- Valeria Loseva / Denis Lunin
- Eva Khachaturian / Igor Eremenko
- Anna Yanovskaya / Ivan Gurianov

== Competitive highlights ==
(with Petrov)

International
Event	1984–85	1985–86
Skate America		2nd
International St. Gervais	1st	
Morzine Avoriaz	2nd	
Nebelhorn Trophy	2nd	
Prize of Moscow News		6th
