= Jana Khokhlova =

Russian ice dancer (born 1985)

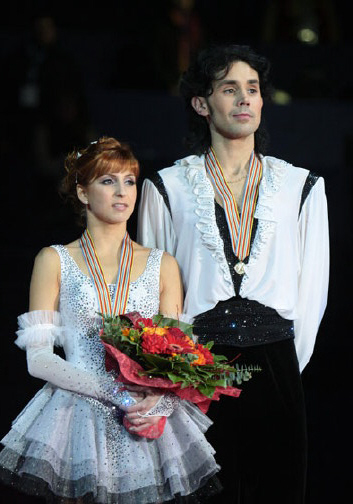
- Khokhlova and Novitski in 2009

Personal information
- Full name: Jana Vadimovna Khokhlova
- Born: 7 October 1985 (age 41) Moscow, Russian SFSR, Soviet Union
- Height: 1.58 m (5 ft 2 in)

Figure skating career
- Country: Russia
- Began skating: 1990
- Retired: 2011
Medal record
Figure skating: Ice dancing
Representing Russia
World Championships
Bronze medal – third place	2008 Gothenburg	Ice dancing
European Championships
Bronze medal – third place	2010 Tallinn	Ice dancing
Gold medal – first place	2009 Helsinki	Ice dancing
Bronze medal – third place	2008 Zagreb	Ice dancing
Winter Universiade
Gold medal – first place	2003 Tarvisio	Ice dancing
Gold medal – first place	2005 Innsbruck	Ice dancing

Jana Vadimovna Khokhlova (Russian: Яна Вадимовна Хохлова, born 7 October 1985) is a Russian former competitive ice dancer. She is best known for her partnership with Sergei Novitski, with whom she is the 2008 World bronze medalist, 2009 European champion, and a two-time (2008–09) Russian national champion. She also competed with Andrei Maximishin and Fedor Andreev.

== Career ==
Khokhlova began her skating career with Aleko, a children's ice ballet based in Moscow. At the age of 13, she considered taking up pair skating but was too old to learn the jumps so a coach suggested she try ice dancing. Khokhlova initially competed with Andrei Maximishin.

=== Partnership with Sergei Novitski ===
In October 2001, Khokhlova teamed up with Sergei Novitski, coached by Larisa Filina. Three months later, they finished seventh at the Russian Nationals. In 2003, they switched to the husband-and-wife coaching team of Alexander Svinin and Irina Zhuk. Khokhlova/Novitski trained mainly in Moscow's Sokolniki ice rink where ice time was limited, forcing them to move around to other rinks, however, the situation later improved.

In 2006, Khokhlova/Novitski qualified for the Olympics in Turin, Italy, finishing 12th. In autumn of 2006, they won their first Grand Prix series medals and qualified for the Grand Prix Final. They placed 4th at 2007 Europeans and 8th at Worlds. Their breakthrough came during the 2007-08 season. At 2007 Trophée Eric Bompard, Khokhlova/Novitski upset reigning European champions Isabel Delobel / Olivier Schoenfelder to win the free dance, although finishing second overall. They then claimed bronze at the 2008 Europeans. At 2008 Worlds, they were second after the original dance which combined with a fifth place in the free dance saw them finish in third overall and earn them a World medal.

During the 2008-09 season, Khokhlova/Novitski won gold at the European Championships but slipped to 6th at Worlds. The following season, they slipped further in the rankings, dropping to third at 2010 Europeans and 9th at the Olympics. They withdrew from Worlds due to Novitski's injury. He had lingering knee problems from a car accident in 2006 so they decided to split in April 2010.

=== Later career ===
Khokhlova tried out with Lithuanian ice dancer Deividas Stagniūnas and Russian-Canadian singles skater Fedor Andreev. In May 2010, it was reported that Khokhlova would team up with Andreev, who had no previous competitive background in ice dance. Khokhlova / Andreev began training together in the second week of July, working on the ice 5–6 hours a day. They trained in Canton, Michigan with his mother Marina Zueva and Igor Shpilband.

Khokhlova / Andreev made their debut at the Golden Spin of Zagreb in December 2010, and went on to compete at 2011 Russian Nationals, finishing fifth in the short dance and third in the free dance for fourth place overall. In June 2011, Andreev injured his knee in a bad fall. In September 2011, it was reported that the partnership had ended due to Andreev's retirement.

Khokhlova coaches in Moscow and also participates in ice shows. She appeared in the 4-8 seasons of ice show contest Ice Age.

== Programs ==
=== With Andreev ===
Season	Short dance	Free dance	Exhibition
2010–11	Natasha's First Waltz (from War and Peace) by Sergei Prokofiev	Abbey Road by The Beatles	Yunona and Avos by Alexey Rybnikov

=== With Novitski ===
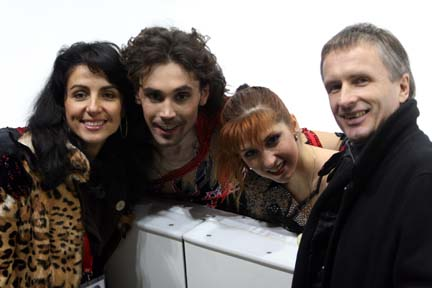
Khokhlova / Novitski with coaches Irina Zhuk and Alexander Svinin at the 2007-08 Grand Prix Final

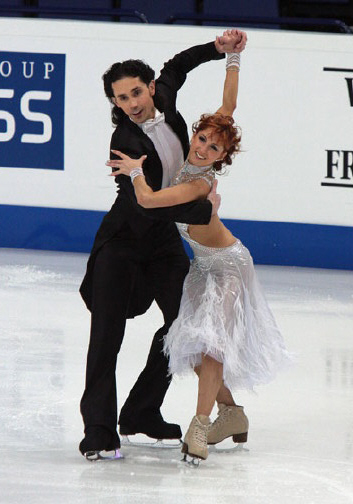
Khokhlova / Novitski perform a compulsory dance at the 2009 Europeans

Season	Original dance	Free dance	Exhibition
2009–10	Russian folk: Vdol po Piterskoi	The Firebird by Igor Stravinsky; The Aquarium from The Carnival of the Animals by Camille Saint-Saëns; Meadowlands by Lev Knipper arranged by Stanley Black	Hotel California by Eagles
2008–09	Blues: Sam's Blues by Sam Taylor; Swing: Puttin' On the Ritz	Rhapsody on a Theme of Paganini by Sergei Rachmaninoff; Caprice 24 by Niccolò Paganini	
2007–08	Russian Gypsy: Two Guitars by Paul Mauriat	Night on Bald Mountain by Modest Mussorgsky; "In the Hall of the Mountain King" (from Peer Gynt) by Edvard Grieg	
2006–07	Tango: Jalousie by Jacob Gade	Aranjuez Mon Amour Joaquín Rodrigo	Dark Eyes
2005–06	Rhumba: Derroche by Ana Belén; Cha Cha: Baila Baila Comigo by Domino	Flamenco Boléro by Maurice Ravel, Gustavo Montesano	Şımarık by Tarkan; Stop by Sam Brown
2004–05	Slow foxtrot: Fever; Quickstep: Sing, Sing, Sing	Pirates of the Caribbean by Klaus Badelt	Stop by Sam Brown
2003–04	Blues: Heartbreak Hotel by Elvis Presley; Rock'n'roll: Hard Headed Woman	Polovtsian Dances Alexander Borodin	Şımarık by Tarkan

== Competitive highlights ==
=== With Andreev ===
International
Event	2010–11
Bavarian Open	2nd
Golden Spin of Zagreb	5th
Mont Blanc Trophy	2nd
National
Russian Championships	4th

=== With Novitski ===
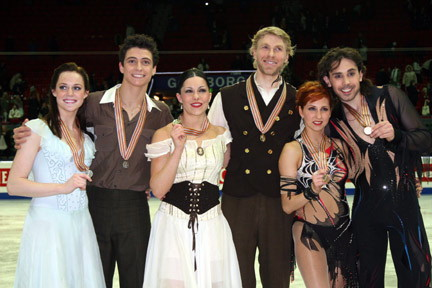
Khokhlova / Novitski with the other dance medalists at the 2008 World Championships

International
Event	01–02	02–03	03–04	04–05	05–06	06–07	07–08	08–09	09–10
Olympics					12th				9th
Worlds					12th	8th	3rd	6th	WD
Europeans					10th	4th	3rd	1st	3rd
GP Final						5th	5th	WD	
GP Bompard					6th		2nd		
GP Cup of China						3rd		3rd	2nd
GP Cup of Russia				7th				1st	
GP NHK Trophy			6th		4th	2nd	3rd		
GP Skate America									4th
GP Skate Canada				6th					
Golden Spin			3rd						
Nebelhorn Trophy			2nd						
Universiade		1st		1st					
National
Russian Champ.	7th	5th	4th	3rd	3rd	2nd	1st	1st	
Team events
World Team Trophy								5th T (4th P)	
GP = Grand Prix; WD = Withdrew

=== With Maximishin ===
National
Event	2000–01
Russian Junior Champ.	9th
