= Alexander Svinin =

Russian ice dancing coach (born 1958)

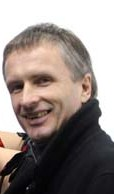

Personal information
- Full name: Alexander Vasilyevich Svinin
- Born: 7 July 1958 (age 68) Leningrad, Russian SFSR, Soviet Union

Figure skating career
- Country: Soviet Union
Medal record
Figure skating: Ice dancing
Representing Soviet Union
European Championships
Silver medal – second place	1983 Dortmund	Ice dancing

Alexander Vasilyevich Svinin (Russian: Александр Васильевич Свинин; born 7 July 1958) is a Russian ice dancing coach and former competitor for the Soviet Union. With Olga Volozhinskaya, he is the 1983 European silver medalist, 1985 Skate Canada International champion, and competed at the 1984 Winter Olympics in Sarajevo.

== Personal life ==
Alexander Vasilyevich Svinin was born on 7 July 1958 in Leningrad, Russian SFSR, Soviet Union. He is married to former Soviet ice dancer Irina Zhuk.

== Career ==
=== As a skater ===
Svinin competed with Olga Volozhinskaya for the Soviet Union. Winners of the 1980 Grand Prix International St. Gervais, they made their senior ISU Championship debut later that season at the 1981 World Championships, placing fifth. Volozhinskaya/Svinin were fourth at the 1982 European Championships and sixth at the 1982 World Championships. Their best international results came the next year — silver at the 1983 European Championships and fourth at the 1983 World Championships.

Volozhinskaya/Svinin placed fifth at the 1984 European Championships and were assigned to the 1984 Winter Olympics where they placed seventh. Although no longer sent to ISU Championships, they competed for two more seasons, winning gold at the 1984 Skate Canada International, bronze at the 1984 Prize of Moscow News, and silver at the 1985 Skate Canada International. After retiring from competition, they performed in ice shows in England and the United States.

=== As a coach ===
In collaboration with Irina Zhuk, Svinin began working as a coach and choreographer at Moscow's Sokolniki ice rink. In 2010, they accepted an offer to move to a new rink, Mechta in the Bibirevo District of Moscow.

Svinin and Zhuk's current students include:

- Sofia Shevchenko / Igor Eremenko

Their former students include:

- Rebeka Kim / Kirill Minov
- Jana Khokhlova / Sergei Novitski (2003–2010)
- Daria Morozova / Mikhail Zhirnov
- Ekaterina Rubleva / Ivan Shefer
- Ekaterina Pushkash / Jonathan Guerreiro (May 2009 – spring 2010)
- Valeria Starygina / Ivan Volobuiev
- Valeria Loseva / Denis Lunin
- Eva Khachaturian / Igor Eremenko
- Anastasia Shpilevaya / Grigory Smirnov
- Anna Yanovskaya / Ivan Gurianov
- Elizaveta Shanaeva / Devid Naryzhnyy (2016–2022)
- Alexandra Stepanova / Ivan Bukin (2006–2023)

== Results ==
with Volozhinskaya

International
Event	77–78	78–79	79–80	80–81	81–82	82–83	83–84	84–85	85–86
Olympics							7th		
Worlds				5th	6th	4th			
Europeans					4th	2nd	5th		
Skate Canada								1st	2nd
Moscow News			6th		3rd			3rd	
St. Gervais				1st					
National
Soviet Champ.	6th	6th	3rd	4th	3rd	2nd	4th	4th	
