= 2008 World Figure Skating Championships =

Annual figure skating competition held in 2008

- Type: ISU Championship
- Date: March 16 – 23
- Season: 2007–08
- Location: Gothenburg, Sweden
- Venue: Scandinavium

Champions
- Men's singles: (Canada) Jeffrey Buttle
- Ladies' singles: (Japan) Mao Asada
- Pairs: (Germany) Aliona Savchenko / Robin Szolkowy
- Ice dance: (France) Isabelle Delobel / Olivier Schoenfelder
- Previous: 2007 World Championships
- Next: 2009 World Championships

The 2008 World Figure Skating Championships was a senior international figure skating competition in the 2007–08 figure skating season. Medals were awarded in the disciplines of men's singles, ladies' singles, pair skating, and ice dancing. The event was held at the Scandinavium arena in Gothenburg, Sweden from March 16 to 23.

== Qualification ==
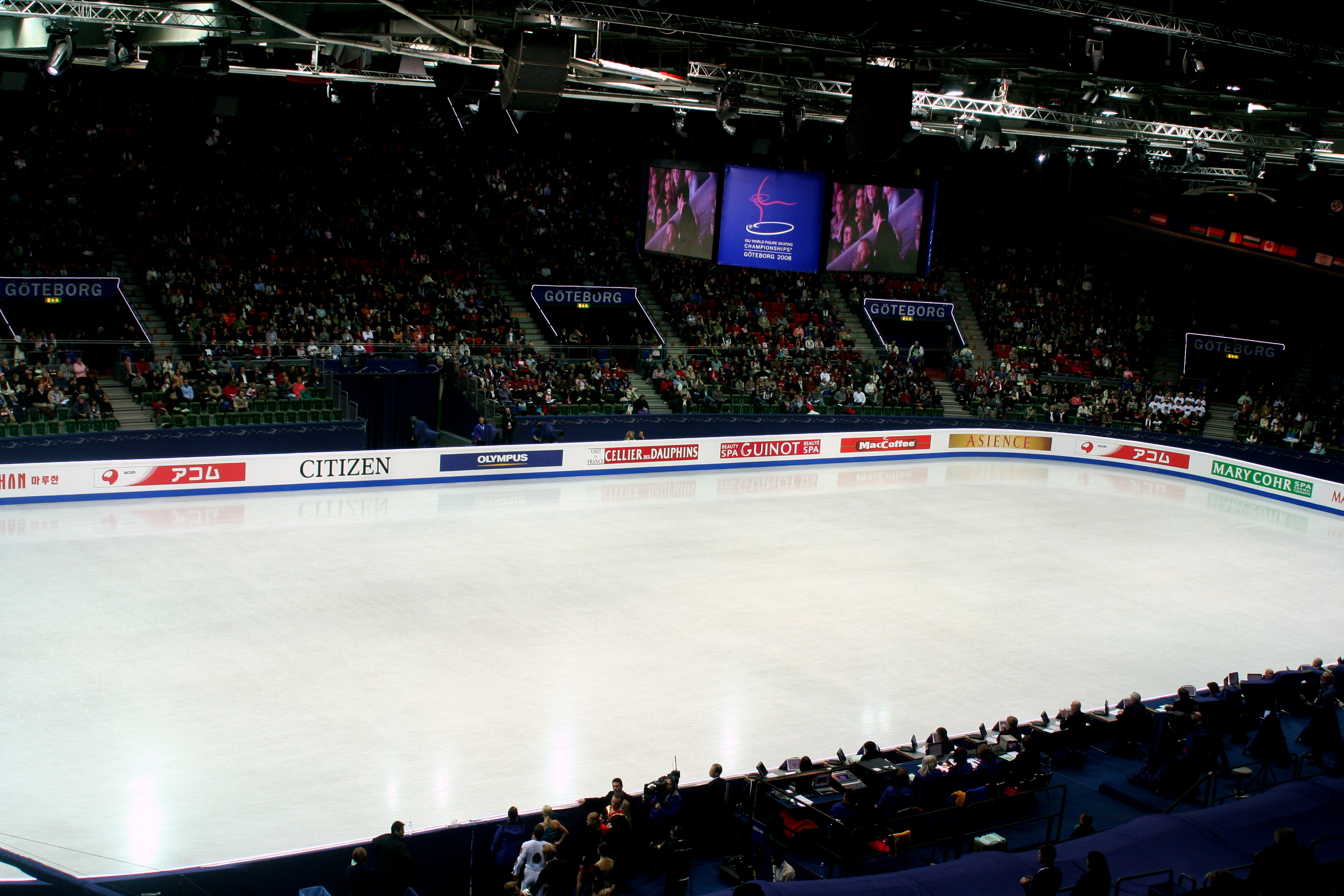
Scandinavium arena during the championship

The competition was open to skaters from ISU member nations who had reached the age of 15 by July 1, 2007. The corresponding competition for younger skaters was the 2008 World Junior Championships.

Based on the results of the 2007 World Championships, each country was allowed between one and three entries per discipline. National associations selected their entries based on their own criteria.

Due to the large number of entries at the World Championships, only the top 24 single skaters and top 20 pairs advanced to the free skating after the short program. In ice dancing, the top 30 couples in the compulsory dance advanced to the original dance, and the top 24 couples after the original dance advanced to the free dance.

== Medals summary ==
=== Medalists ===
Event	Gold	Silver	Bronze
Men	(Canada) Jeffrey Buttle	(France) Brian Joubert	(United States) Johnny Weir
Ladies	(Japan) Mao Asada	(Italy) Carolina Kostner	(South Korea) Kim Yuna
Pairs	(Germany) Aliona Savchenko / Robin Szolkowy	(China) Zhang Dan / Zhang Hao	(Canada) Jessica Dubé / Bryce Davison
Ice dancing	(France) Isabelle Delobel / Olivier Schoenfelder	(Canada) Tessa Virtue / Scott Moir	(Russia) Jana Khokhlova / Sergei Novitski

=== Medals by country ===
Rank	Nation	Gold	Silver	Bronze	Total
1	Canada (CAN)	1	1	1	3
2	France (FRA)	1	1	0	2
3	Germany (GER)	1	0	0	1
3	Japan (JPN)	1	0	0	1
5	China (CHN)	0	1	0	1
5	Italy (ITA)	0	1	0	1
7	Russia (RUS)	0	0	1	1
7	South Korea (KOR)	0	0	1	1
7	United States (USA)	0	0	1	1
Totals (9 entries)		4	4	4	12

== Competition notes ==
The compulsory dance was the Argentine Tango.

Dan Zhang / Hao Zhang from China set a new world record of 74.36 points under the ISU Judging System for pairs' short program.

European champion ice dancers Oksana Domnina / Maxim Shabalin (RUS) withdrew before the event due to an injury to his knee. They were replaced by Ekaterina Bobrova / Dmitri Soloviev. Four Continents and Grand Prix Final bronze medalist Evan Lysacek withdrew before the event due to injury. He was replaced by US pewter medalist Jeremy Abbott.

== Results ==
=== Men ===
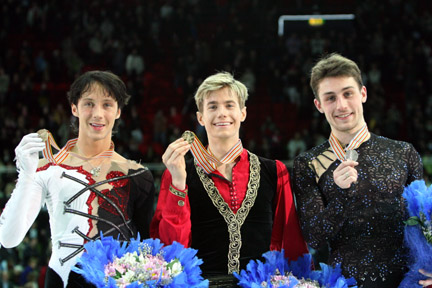
The men's podium. From left: Johnny Weir (3rd), Jeffrey Buttle (1st), Brian Joubert (2nd).

Jeffrey Buttle was the sixth Canadian man to win the world title. His win set off a controversy because he did not attempt a quadruple jump. Brian Joubert the silver medalist criticized the system for producing a winner who did not complete or attempt a quadruple jump. This set off the first of many debates on the value of the quads and what men's figure skating should be about that would culminate in the 2010 Olympic Quadruple jump controversy.

Rank	Name	Nation	Total points	SP		FS	
1	Jeffrey Buttle	Canada	245.17	1	82.10	1	163.07
2	Brian Joubert	France	231.22	6	77.75	2	153.47
3	Johnny Weir	United States	221.84	2	80.79	5	141.05
4	Daisuke Takahashi	Japan	220.11	3	80.40	6	139.71
5	Stéphane Lambiel	Switzerland	217.88	5	79.12	7	138.76
6	Kevin van der Perren	Belgium	216.02	9	70.24	3	145.78
7	Sergei Voronov	Russia	209.93	15	65.26	4	144.67
8	Takahiko Kozuka	Japan	205.15	8	70.91	8	134.24
9	Patrick Chan	Canada	203.55	7	72.81	11	130.74
10	Stephen Carriere	United States	201.69	11	68.20	9	133.49
11	Jeremy Abbott	United States	197.26	14	65.61	10	131.65
12	Sergei Davydov	Belarus	196.79	12	68.19	12	128.60
13	Adrian Schultheiss	Sweden	194.39	13	66.45	13	127.94
14	Kristoffer Berntsson	Sweden	193.72	10	69.02	15	124.70
15	Tomáš Verner	Czech Republic	191.94	4	79.87	20	112.07
16	Karel Zelenka	Italy	187.65	17	64.05	16	123.60
17	Gregor Urbas	Slovenia	187.48	18	61.65	14	125.83
18	Yannick Ponsero	France	182.06	16	64.46	18	117.60
19	Yasuharu Nanri	Japan	179.88	20	60.89	17	118.99
20	Anton Kovalevski	Ukraine	178.13	21	60.74	19	117.39
21	Igor Macypura	Slovakia	169.93	19	61.19	21	108.74
22	Jamal Othman	Switzerland	164.02	22	57.75	22	106.27
23	Li Chengjiang	China	155.75	23	53.99	23	101.76
24	Abzal Rakimgaliev	Kazakhstan	149.92	24	51.58	24	98.34
Free Skating Not Reached
25	Alexandr Kazakov	Belarus		25	51.00		
26	Michael Chrolenko	Norway		26	50.50		
27	Pavel Kaška	Czech Republic		27	49.98		
28	Boris Martinec	Croatia		28	48.91		
29	Elliot Hilton	United Kingdom		29	48.10		
30	Javier Fernández	Spain		30	47.87		
31	Mikko Minkkinen	Finland		31	47.15		
32	Peter Liebers	Germany		32	46.96		
33	Zoltán Kelemen	Romania		33	45.58		
34	Maxim Shipov	Israel		34	44.32		
35	Sean Carlow	Australia		35	43.98		
36	Luis Hernández	Mexico		36	42.74		
37	Manuel Koll	Austria		37	42.47		
38	Justin Pietersen	South Africa		38	38.67		
39	Naiden Borichev	Bulgaria		39	38.36		
40	Konstantin Tupikov	Poland		40	37.47		
41	Tristan Thode	New Zealand		41	35.29		
42	Kutay Eryoldas	Turkey		42	35.04		
43	Danil Privalov	Azerbaijan		43	34.73		
44	Tigran Vardanjan	Hungary		44	32.37		
45	Saulius Ambrulevičius	Lithuania		45	28.63		
WD	Alban Préaubert	France					

=== Ladies ===
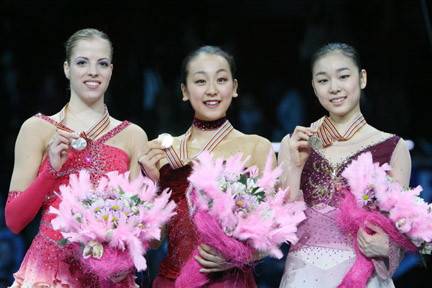
The ladies' podium. From left: Carolina Kostner (2nd), Mao Asada (1st), Kim Yuna (3rd).

Carolina Kostner led the short program with 64.28 points, just 0.18 points higher than Mao Asada who was in second. Kim Yuna fell on her triple Lutz, leaving her in fifth place after the short program. Despite popping a triple lutz at the end of her program and saving multiple jump landings, Kim earned the top free skate score of 123.38 points. Kostner received negative grade of execution on five of her seven jumping passes but still managed the third highest free score. Asada, one of two women attempting the triple Axel in the competition, fell during the takeoff of the axel, but still managed to do two triple-triples and score 1.46 points higher than Kostner, securing the gold medal. Silver went to Kostner and Kim received the bronze medal.

Rank	Name	Nation	Total points	SP		FS	
1	Mao Asada	Japan	185.56	2	64.10	2	121.46
2	Carolina Kostner	Italy	184.68	1	64.28	3	120.40
3	Kim Yuna	South Korea	183.23	5	59.85	1	123.38
4	Yukari Nakano	Japan	177.40	3	61.10	4	116.30
5	Joannie Rochette	Canada	174.12	6	59.53	5	114.59
6	Sarah Meier	Switzerland	171.88	7	59.49	6	112.39
7	Kimmie Meissner	United States	149.74	9	57.25	12	92.49
8	Laura Lepistö	Finland	147.26	21	45.41	7	101.85
9	Kiira Korpi	Finland	145.73	4	60.58	17	85.15
10	Beatrisa Liang	United States	145.29	10	52.81	13	92.48
11	Júlia Sebestyén	Hungary	145.17	19	47.04	8	98.13
12	Annette Dytrt	Germany	144.31	12	50.99	11	93.32
13	Valentina Marchei	Italy	142.93	17	48.89	9	94.04
14	Mira Leung	Canada	140.59	14	50.69	14	89.90
15	Jelena Glebova	Estonia	140.10	20	46.26	10	93.84
16	Ashley Wagner	United States	137.40	11	51.49	15	85.91
17	Ksenia Doronina	Russia	135.25	15	49.94	16	85.31
18	Viktoria Helgesson	Sweden	127.96	16	49.68	20	78.28
19	Kim Na-young	South Korea	127.32	18	47.96	19	79.36
20	Elene Gedevanishvili	Georgia	125.99	23	44.06	18	81.93
21	Anastasia Gimazetdinova	Uzbekistan	124.92	13	50.84	21	74.08
22	Tamar Katz	Israel	116.86	24	43.58	22	73.28
23	Melinda Sherilyn Wang	Chinese Taipei	116.12	22	44.77	23	71.35
WD	Miki Ando	Japan		8	59.21		
Free Skating Not Reached
25	Jenna McCorkell	United Kingdom		25	42.55		
26	Ivana Reitmayerová	Slovakia		26	41.79		
27	Tuğba Karademir	Turkey		27	38.71		
28	Mérovée Ephrem	Monaco		28	38.61		
29	Victoria Muniz	Puerto Rico		29	38.41		
30	Sonia Lafuente	Spain		30	38.35		
31	Liu Yan	China		31	38.13		
32	Nella Simaová	Czech Republic		32	37.72		
33	Sonia Radeva	Bulgaria		33	37.44		
34	Anna Jurkiewicz	Poland		34	37.09		
35	Irina Movchan	Ukraine		35	36.17		
36	Julia Sheremet	Belarus		36	34.69		
37	Tina Wang	Australia		37	34.00		
38	Candice Didier	France		38	33.91		
39	Roxana Luca	Romania		39	32.07		
40	Viviane Käser	Switzerland		40	30.37		
41	Mirna Libric	Croatia		41	30.20		
42	Ksenia Jastsenjski	Serbia		42	29.05		
43	Barbara Klerk	Belgium		43	28.38		
44	Loretta Hamui	Mexico		44	28.15		
45	Gracielle Jeanne Tan	Philippines		45	27.85		
46	Denise Koegl	Austria		46	27.36		
47	Charissa Tansomboon	Thailand		47	27.28		
48	Stasia Rage	Latvia		48	26.45		
49	Tamami Ono	Hong Kong		49	26.20		
50	Maria-Elena Papasotiriou	Greece		50	25.95		
51	Lejeanne Marais	South Africa		51	25.85		
52	Morgan Figgins	New Zealand		52	25.16		
53	Beatrice Rozinskaite	Lithuania		53	24.02		

=== Pairs ===
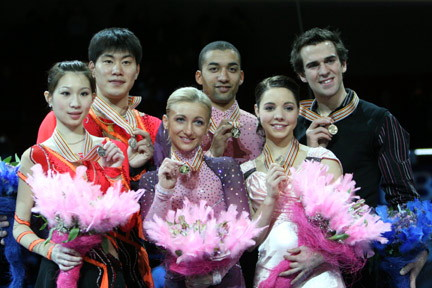
The pairs' podium. From left: Zhang Dan / Zhang Hao (2nd), Aliona Savchenko / Robin Szolkowy (1st), Jessica Dubé / Bryce Davison (3rd).

Rank	Name	Nation	Total points	SP		FS	
1	Aliona Savchenko / Robin Szolkowy	Germany	202.86	2	72.00	1	130.86
2	Zhang Dan / Zhang Hao	China	197.82	1	74.36	3	123.46
3	Jessica Dubé / Bryce Davison	Canada	192.78	4	68.66	2	124.12
4	Yuko Kawaguchi / Alexander Smirnov	Russia	191.33	3	71.42	4	119.91
5	Pang Qing / Tong Jian	China	186.78	5	67.87	5	118.91
6	Meagan Duhamel / Craig Buntin	Canada	169.61	7	60.01	6	109.60
7	Maria Mukhortova / Maxim Trankov	Russia	166.64	6	64.09	9	102.55
8	Anabelle Langlois / Cody Hay	Canada	164.67	9	59.43	7	105.24
9	Tatiana Volosozhar / Stanislav Morozov	Ukraine	159.95	8	59.53	10	100.42
10	Rena Inoue / John Baldwin	United States	157.20	10	53.83	8	103.37
11	Brooke Castile / Benjamin Okolski	United States	146.03	12	49.59	11	96.44
12	Dong Huibo / Wu Yiming	China	142.83	11	50.49	12	92.34
13	Laura Magitteri / Ondřej Hotárek	Italy	126.38	14	42.18	13	84.20
14	Adeline Canac / Maximin Coia	France	124.68	16	41.75	14	82.93
15	Stacey Kemp / David King	United Kingdom	123.98	13	44.28	15	79.70
16	Dominika Piątkowska / Dmitri Khromin	Poland	111.94	17	38.32	16	73.62
17	Hayley Anne Sacks / Vadim Akolzin	Israel	111.23	15	41.96	17	69.27
18	Marina Aganina / Dmitri Zobnin	Uzbekistan	97.31	18	35.24	19	62.07
19	Ariel Fay Gagnon / Chad Tsagris	Greece	95.65	19	33.34	18	62.31
20	Amy Ireland / Michael Bahoric	Croatia	77.39	20	26.57	20	50.82
WD	Ekaterina Kostenko / Roman Talan	Ukraine					

=== Ice dancing ===
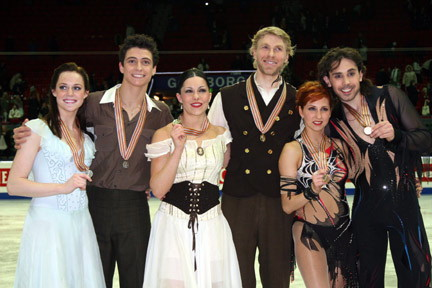
The ice dancing podium. From left: Tessa Virtue / Scott Moir (2nd), Isabelle Delobel / Olivier Schoenfelder (1st), Jana Khokhlova / Sergei Novitski (3rd).

Rank	Name	Nation	Total points	CD		OD		FD	
1	Isabelle Delobel / Olivier Schoenfelder	France	212.94	1	40.73	1	67.25	2	104.96
2	Tessa Virtue / Scott Moir	Canada	208.80	2	38.71	3	64.81	1	105.28
3	Jana Khokhlova / Sergei Novitski	Russia	203.26	3	37.98	2	65.99	5	99.29
4	Tanith Belbin / Benjamin Agosto	United States	203.00	5	35.02	4	64.69	3	103.29
5	Federica Faiella / Massimo Scali	Italy	201.91	4	37.15	5	63.55	4	101.21
6	Meryl Davis / Charlie White	United States	191.19	7	34.80	7	60.36	6	96.03
7	Nathalie Péchalat / Fabian Bourzat	France	190.51	6	34.82	6	60.67	7	95.02
8	Sinead Kerr / John Kerr	United Kingdom	186.94	8	33.48	8	59.86	8	93.60
9	Alexandra Zaretski / Roman Zaretski	Israel	179.21	9	32.51	9	58.10	10	88.60
10	Anna Cappellini / Luca Lanotte	Italy	179.03	11	31.52	10	57.05	9	90.46
11	Kristin Fraser / Igor Lukanin	Azerbaijan	173.95	10	31.86	11	56.35	11	85.74
12	Kimberly Navarro / Brent Bommentre	United States	165.90	12	31.48	13	52.10	14	82.32
13	Ekaterina Bobrova / Dmitri Soloviev	Russia	164.72	16	29.12	12	52.88	13	82.72
14	Katherine Copely / Deividas Stagniūnas	Lithuania	164.28	13	29.85	14	51.66	12	82.77
15	Ekaterina Rubleva / Ivan Shefer	Russia	160.37	15	29.14	15	49.52	15	81.71
16	Cathy Reed / Chris Reed	Japan	155.15	18	28.16	18	47.70	16	79.29
17	Kaitlyn Weaver / Andrew Poje	Canada	154.84	20	27.74	17	48.62	17	78.48
18	Anna Zadorozhniuk / Sergei Verbillo	Ukraine	153.25	14	29.31	16	49.17	21	74.77
19	Allie Hann-McCurdy / Michael Coreno	Canada	153.13	17	28.33	19	47.01	18	77.79
20	Nelli Zhiganshina / Alexander Gazsi	Germany	150.82	19	28.07	21	45.52	19	77.23
21	Barbora Silná / Dmitri Matsjuk	Austria	147.21	21	24.85	20	46.90	20	75.46
22	Yu Xiaoyang / Wang Chen	China	139.20	23	23.90	23	43.97	23	71.33
23	Kamila Hájková / David Vincour	Czech Republic	138.63	22	24.06	25	41.91	22	72.66
24	Leonie Krail / Oscar Peter	Switzerland	126.50	25	22.38	22	44.10	24	60.02
Free Dance Not Reached
25	Krisztina Barta / Ádám Tóth	Hungary	64.08	27	21.44	24	42.64		
26	Joanna Budner / Jan Mościcki	Poland	62.28	24	23.61	28	38.67		
27	Danielle O'Brien / Gregory Merriman	Australia	60.12	28	20.24	27	39.88		
28	Ksenia Shmirina / Egor Maistrov	Belarus	59.37	29	18.87	26	40.50		
29	Yu Sun Hye / Ramil Sarkulov	Uzbekistan	56.93	26	21.85	30	35.08		
30	Ina Demireva / Juri Kurakin	Bulgaria	53.38	30	17.75	29	35.63		
Original Dance Not Reached
31	Kristina Kiudmaa / Aleksei Trohlev	Estonia		31	16.72				

== Multiple spots for 2009 Worlds ==
The following countries have earned more than one entry to the 2009 World Championships based on performance at the 2008 World Championships.

Spots	Men	Ladies	Pairs	Dance
3	Canada; Japan; United States	Japan	Canada; China; Germany; Russia	France; United States
2	Belgium; France; Russia; Sweden; Switzerland	Canada; Finland; Italy; South Korea; Switzerland; United States	Ukraine; United States	Canada; Israel; Italy; Russia; United Kingdom
