= Ekaterina Rubleva =

Russian ice dancer

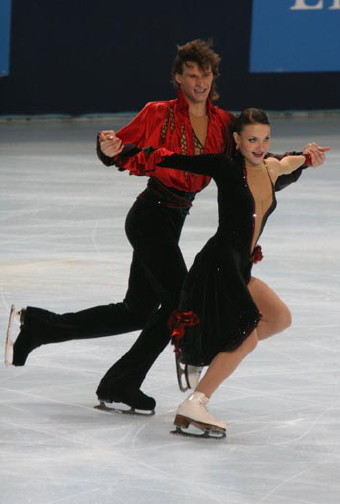
- Rubleva and Shefer in 2008.

Personal information
- Full name: Ekaterina Borisovna Rubleva
- Born: 10 October 1985 (age 40) Odesa, Ukrainian SSR, Soviet Union
- Height: 1.63 m (5 ft 4 in)

Figure skating career
- Country: Russia
- Partner: Ivan Shefer
- Skating club: Vorobievye Gory
- Began skating: 1990
- Retired: 2010
Medal record
Representing Russia
Figure skating: Ice dancing
Winter Universiade
Silver medal – second place	2009 Harbin	Ice dancing

Ekaterina Borisovna Rubleva (Russian: Екатерина Борисовна Рублёва, Ukrainian: Катерина Борисівна Рубльова; born 10 October 1985) is a Russian former competitive ice dancer. With partner Ivan Shefer, she is the 2009 Cup of Russia bronze medalist, the 2004 Bofrost Cup bronze medalist, and a four-time Russian national medalist (2008, 2009 silver; 2007, 2010 bronze).

== Personal life ==
Born in Odesa, Ukrainian SSR, Soviet Union, Ekaterina Rubleva grew up in Moscow and competed internationally for Russia for her entire career. She is the daughter of ice dancers Svetlana Bakina and Boris Rublev who represented the Soviet Union. She is currently coaching 2019–20 ISU Junior Grand Prix medalist Sofya Tyutyunina/Alexander Shustitskiy at Moscow.

== Career ==
Rubleva began skating because her parents did not have a babysitter so they brought her along to the rink. She teamed up with Ivan Shefer in 1994. Rubleva / Shefer began competing internationally in the 2001–2002 season and debuted on the ISU Junior Grand Prix. They placed 5th and 4th at their 2001–2002 ISU Junior Grand Prix events in Sweden and the Czech Republic. At the Russian Championships, they placed 8th on the senior level and 6th on the junior level.

In the 2002–2003 season, Rubleva / Shefer won the silver medal at the 2002–2003 ISU Junior Grand Prix event in China and placed 4th at the event in Germany to qualify for the Junior Grand Prix Final, where they placed 8th. In the 2003–2004 season, they won silver medals at both their events on the 2003–2004 ISU Junior Grand Prix circuit to qualify for the Final. They placed 7th at the Junior Grand Prix Final. They placed 5th on the senior level at the 2004 Russian Championships and then won the bronze medal on the junior level. They were sent to the 2004 Junior Worlds, where they placed 6th.

Rubleva / Shefer moved up to the senior level internationally in the 2004–2005 season. They placed 4th at the 2004 Nebelhorn Trophy and won the bronze medal at the 2004 Bofrost Cup on Ice. They placed 5th at the 2005 Russian Championships. They competed at the 2005 Winter Universiade, where they placed 5th.

In the 2005–2006 season, they made their Grand Prix debut, placing 9th at the 2005 Skate America. They placed 6th at the 2006 Russian Championships. They changed coaches in spring 2006, moving from Elena Kustarova to Alexander Svinin and Irina Zhuk.

In 2006–2007, Rubleva / Shefer withdrew from the 2006 Cup of Russia before the start of the event. They won the bronze medal at the 2007 Russian Championships and were sent to the 2007 European Championships, where they placed 12th in their debut.

In the 2007–2008 season, Rubleva / Shefer placed 8th at the 2007 Skate America and 7th at the 2007 Cup of Russia. They won the silver medal at the 2008 Russian Championships and were assigned to the 2008 European Championships, where they placed 13th. They then competed at the 2008 Worlds, where they placed 15th.

In 2008–2009, Rubleva / Shefer placed 6th at the 2008 Skate America and then 7th at the 2008 Trophée Eric Bompard. They won their second consecutive national silver medal at the 2009 Russian Championships and were assigned to the 2009 European Championships. At Europeans, Rubleva suffered a wardrobe malfunction during the compulsory dance when a strap on her dress broke and briefly exposed her right breast. They placed 8th in their third consecutive appearance at the event. Rubleva / Shefer then competed at the 2009 Winter Universiade, where they won the silver medal, 39 years after Rubleva's parents had won their Winter Universiade silver medal.

In 2009–2010, they won a Grand Prix medal, bronze at the Cup of Russia. They finished 13th in their second appearance at the World Championships. Rubleva / Shefer retired from competitive skating in August 2010. Rubleva began coaching at the Sokolniki rink in Moscow.

== Programs ==
(with Shefer)

Season	Original dance	Free dance	Exhibition
2009–2010	Valenki (Russian folk dance)	Une Vie d'Amour by Charles Aznavour and Mireille Mathieu	Padonne-moi ce caprice d'enfant by Mireille Mathieu
2008–2009	St. Louis Blues; Sing, Sing, Sing	Nyah (from Mission: Impossible II) by Hans Zimmer; Solo Tu (from Frida) by Elliot Goldenthal; Flamenco	
2007–2008	Hopak (Ukrainian folk dance)	Prayer in the Night (Suite No. 4 by George Frideric Handel new arrangement)	
2006–2007	La cumparsita	Aria of the Black Swan (Swan Lake - modern arrangement)	
2005–2006		Still Loving You by the Scorpions; Hurricane 2000 by the Scorpions	
2003–2004		Rhapsody on a Theme of Paganini by Sergei Rachmaninoff	
2002–2003		Roméo et Juliette, de la Haine à l'Amour by Gerard Presgurvic	

== Competitive highlights ==
(with Shefer)

Results
International
Event	1999–00	2000–01	2001–02	2002–03	2003–04	2004–05	2005–06	2006–07	2007–08	2008–09	2009–10
Worlds									15th		13th
Europeans								12th	13th	8th	
GP Bompard										7th	5th
GP Cup of Russia								WD	7th		3rd
GP Skate America							9th		8th	6th	
Bofrost						3rd					
Nebelhorn						4th					
Universiade						5th				2nd	
International: Junior
Junior Worlds					6th						
JGP Final				8th	7th						
JGP China				2nd							
JGP Czech			4th								
JGP Germany				4th							
JGP Poland					2nd						
JGP Slovenia					2nd						
JGP Sweden			5th								
National
Russian	9th	9th	8th		5th	5th	6th	3rd	2nd	2nd	3rd
Russian Junior			6th		3rd						
GP = Grand Prix; JGP = Junior Grand Prix; WD = Withdrew
