= Welshly Arms =

American rock band

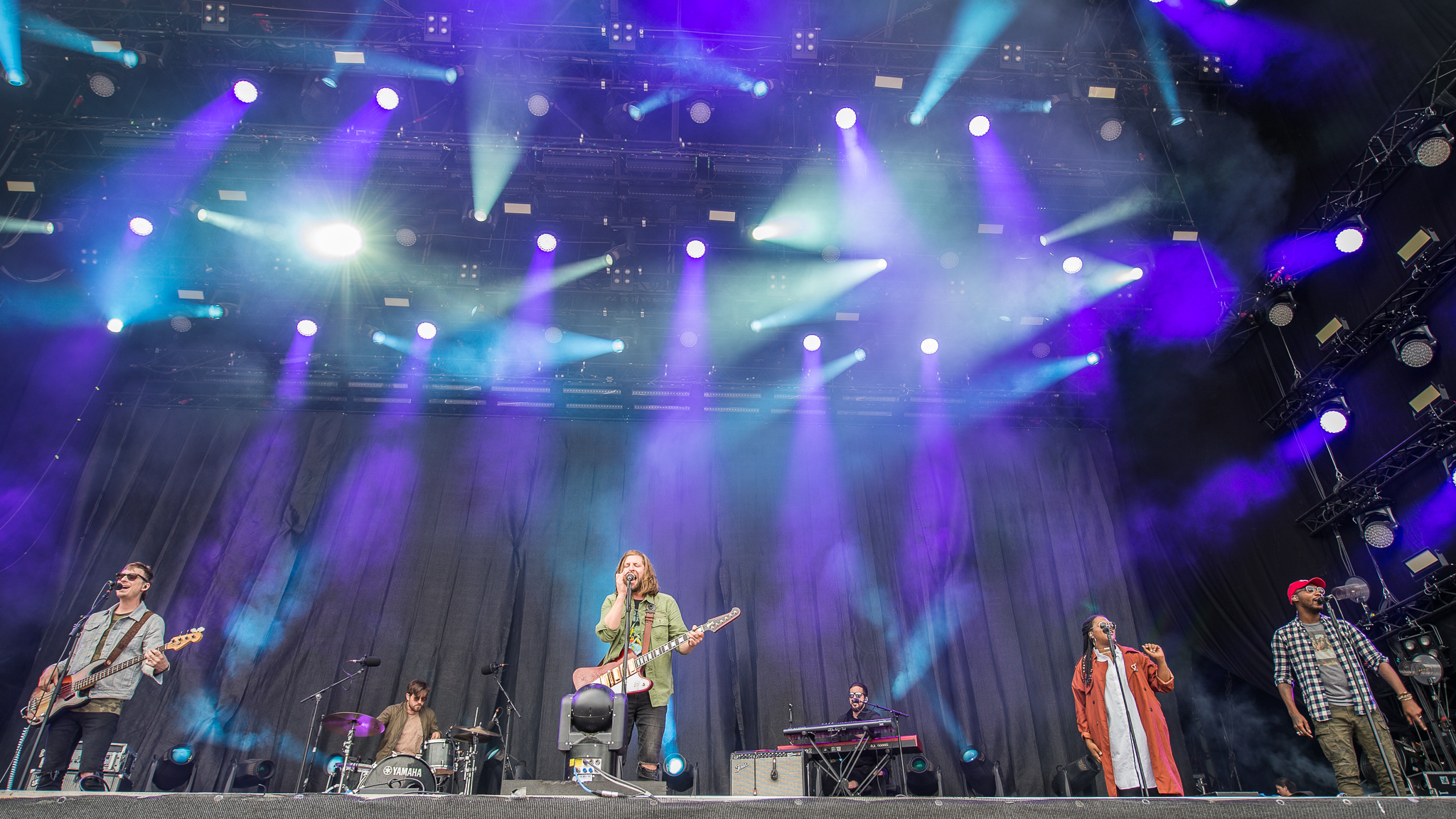

Background information
- Origin: Cleveland, Ohio, United States
- Genres: Alternative rock, blues rock, soul, indie rock
- Years active: 2013–present
- Labels: Position, Universal
- Spinoffs: Sonny Cleveland, Lady Bri
- Members: Sam Getz; Jimmy Weaver; Mike Gould; Bri Bryant; Jon Bryant
- Past members: Brett Lindemann
- Website: welshlyarms.com

Welshly Arms are an American blues rock band from Cleveland, Ohio, United States. The band has been active since their debut in 2013 with the EP Welcome. The following year, they released a covers EP and in 2015, an album titled Welshly Arms. The band writes, produces, and records all of their material in Cleveland. Their name is in reference to a fictional hotel in a Will Ferrell sketch on Saturday Night Live. Their influences include Jimi Hendrix, The Temptations, Otis Redding, and Howlin' Wolf. Musicians from the band's hometown of Cleveland have also influenced them, such as The O'Jays, The James Gang, and The Black Keys.

Welshly Arms' music has been featured in trailers for two films: The D Train (starring Jack Black) and The Hateful Eight (directed by Quentin Tarantino). The song "Legendary" was chosen as the official theme song for WWE's 2017 TLC pay-per-view, as well as the national TV and radio campaign for the Cleveland Indians and a promo for the Netflix show Sense8 and it also features as one of the ending songs in the movie Den of Thieves. The song "Sanctuary" was featured in season 3 of Lucifer and the 9-1-1 season 2 finale. It has also featured at the end of episode 5 of Shades of Blue season 3 and was used in the menu soundtrack of the video game Asphalt 9: Legends.

== Members ==
Current members

- Sam Getz – lead vocals, guitar
- Jimmy Weaver – bass, vocals
- Mike Gould – drums
- Bri Bryant – vocals
- Jon Bryant – vocals

While Welshly Arms' website lists five official band members, concert performances after Brett Lindemann's departure have included Cleveland-based musician Nate Saggio on the keyboard, coupled with his appearances on the band's social media posts.

Past members

- Brett Lindemann – keyboard, vocals

== Discography ==
Studio albums

- Welshly Arms (Position Music, 2015)
- No Place Is Home (Position Music, 2018)
- Wasted Words & Bad Decisions (Position Music, 2023)
- Nothing But Static (Position Music, 2026)

EPs

- Welcome EP (2013)
- Covers EP (2014)
- Legendary EP (2017)
- Dangerous EP (2022)

Singles

Title	Year	Chart positions				Album
Title	Year	US Adult	US Alt.	US Rock Air.	US Rock	Album
"Legendary"	2017	28	17	22	39	No Place Is Home
