= Legendary (Welshly Arms song) =

2016 single by Welshly Arms

Single by Welshly Arms

from the album No Place Is Home
- Released: July 11, 2016
- Genre: Alternative rock
- Length: 3:52
- Label: Universal
- Songwriters: James Weaver; Sam Getz
- Producers: James Weaver; Sam Getz

Welshly Arms singles chronology
"Need You Tonight" (2015)	"Legendary" (2016)	"Bad Blood" (2016)

Music video
- "Legendary" on YouTube

"Legendary" is a song by American blues rock band Welshly Arms. It was released on July 11, 2016, and the music video was released on June 26, 2017. The song was featured at the end of an episode of the NBC show, Shades of Blue, served as the end credits song for the 2018 film Den of Thieves, and was featured in the menu soundtrack of the video game Asphalt 9: Legends.

== Background and composition ==
"Legendary" was written by the band's lead vocalist Sam Getz and bass guitarist James Weaver. The song is described as about "going through struggles and following through and coming out on top, [sic] going through some of the worst in life and realizing you're stronger and better because of it." Moreover, Weaver said that the song was the first song where they structured it to tell a story and "maybe be a little bit more radio friendly" than what they were previously doing.

According to Getz, the idea for the song's chorus came up when he was in the shower, where he immediately grabbed his phone and recorded the song on the spot. In an interview, he said that he drew on personal experiences while writing the song at the point when the verses begin. He added, "you have the chance to be legendary, you have the chance to leave your mark on the music world:"

"It is a rocky road to get [to the music world]. You have to fight the battles. If we had listened to everyone who thought one of our songs were shit, we would have stopped making music ages ago. No matter what you do, you have to have thick skin to really be great at what you do. That's how it is in our world of music. When I wrote the lyrics, I was definitely thinking of a great athlete or a good journalist. Whatever you do, I think this attitude exists everywhere, everyone has to overcome hurdles on their way."

== Release and music video ==
"Legendary" was released on all music streaming services as a single on July 11, 2016. The music video was later published on June 26, 2017. The song was later added to the band's studio album, No Place Is Home.

The music video starts with a bank robbery and ends with the band in animal masks, being driven around the streets of Los Angeles by a woman armed with a pump action shotgun. According to Mikey Gould, the band's drummer, "it was awesome to see what went into the production and getting to cruise around LA with a police detail escorting us. It was great timing wise because we shot it during the dead of winter in Cleveland so to get to roll around LA with the top down on a sweet vintage car felt really good."

== In popular culture ==
"Legendary" was featured at the end of an episode of the NBC show, Shades of Blue. The song also served as the end credits song for the 2018 film Den of Thieves. In addition, the song was used as part of the soundtrack of the 2018 racing game Asphalt 9: Legends.

== Credits and personnel ==
- James Weaver – producer, songwriter, mixing engineer, bass guitar, background vocals
- Sam Getz – producer, songwriter, vocals, electric guitar
- Dale Becker – mastering engineer
- Brett Lindemann – keyboards
- Bri Bryant – background vocals
- Jon Bryant – background vocals
- Mikey Gould – drums

== Track listing ==
Digital download/streaming

1. "Legendary" – 3:52

Digital download/streaming – Aron remix

1. "Legendary" (ARON remix) – 3:35

Digital download/streaming – Acoustic version

1. "Legendary" (Acoustic) – 3:36

Digital download/streaming – Stripped version

1. "Legendary" (Stripped) – 3:44
2. "Dangerous"

== Charts ==
=== Weekly charts ===
Weekly chart performance for "Legendary"
Chart (2017–18)	Peak position
Austria (Ö3 Austria Top 40)	18
Belgium (Ultratip Bubbling Under Flanders)	10
Czech Republic Airplay (ČNS IFPI)	5
Germany (GfK)	16
Switzerland (Schweizer Hitparade)	28
US Adult Pop Airplay (Billboard)	28
US Hot Rock & Alternative Songs (Billboard)	39
US Rock & Alternative Airplay (Billboard)	22

=== Year-end charts ===
Year-end chart performance for "Legendary"
Chart (2017)	Position
Austria (Ö3 Austria Top 40)	64
Germany (Official German Charts)	66
Switzerland (Schweizer Hitparade)	69

== Certifications ==
Certifications and sales for "Legendary"
Region	Certification	Certified units/sales
Brazil (Pro-Música Brasil)	Gold	30,000^{‡}
France (SNEP)	Gold	100,000^{‡}
Germany (BVMI)	Platinum	400,000^{‡}
United Kingdom (BPI)	Silver	200,000^{‡}
^{‡} Sales+streaming figures based on certification alone.

== Release history ==
Release dates and formats for "Legendary"
Region	Date	Format(s)	Version	Label	Ref.
Various	July 11, 2016	Digital download; streaming	Original	Universal	
Various	July 7, 2017	Digital download; streaming	Aron remix	Universal	
Various	July 21, 2017	Digital download; streaming	Acoustic	Universal	
Various	July 25, 2017	Digital download; streaming	EP track	Universal	
Various	May 25, 2018	Digital download; streaming	Album track	Universal	
Various	August 12, 2022	Digital download; streaming	Stripped	Position	
