= Métisse (band) =

Irish/African soul/electronica band

Métisse is an Irish/African soul/electronica band, formed by former Chapter House member Skully, and Aïda Bredou, a singer/choreographer from Côte d'Ivoire. They formed in Toulouse, France. The band's name is the French word for 'a girl or woman of mixed racial heritage', and its music is a mix of African, Celtic, soul and electronic music. Song lyrics often feature a mixture of Dioula, English and French words.

The band achieved initial success with the single "Sousoundé". Its next hit, "Boom Boom Bâ" was the featured title track in Madonna's film The Next Best Thing and was played several times in the Showtime TV series Dead Like Me. It was also occasionally played as a bumper music song on the international radio program Coast to Coast AM, by founder Art Bell. In addition, "Nomah's Land" was played in the Dead Like Me second season episode "The Shallow End".

They released two new singles in 2013, "You Are Beautiful" and "I See People".

Métisse's music has been licensed for numerous television, film productions and advertising campaigns. They have two albums, My Fault and Nomah's Land, though their music has been licensed for several compilation discs.

== Albums ==
My Fault (2000)

1. Sousoundé
2. Sadness
3. Boom Boom Bâ
4. CoCo
5. Pray
6. Fool Inside
7. Azo Azo
8. My Fault
9. Walking Home
10. Aicha
11. Aliguiné

Nomah's Land (2007)

1. Nomah's Land
2. Life
3. Lovers Game
4. In A Way
5. I Love You
6. World Of Our Own
7. The Rain Is Falling
8. Journey To Oasis
9. Take A Left
10. Therapy
