= Avonley Nguyen =

American figure skater (born 2002)

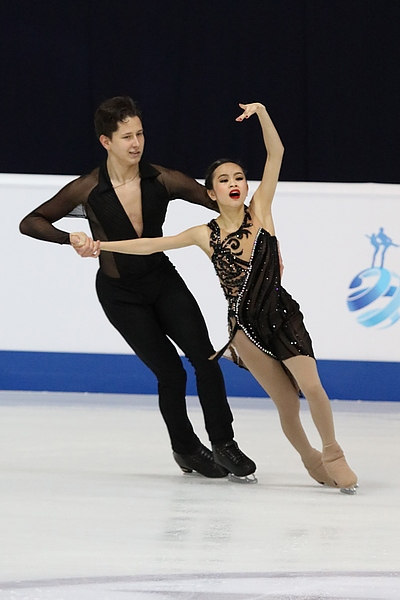
- Avonley Nguyen and Vadym Kolesnik at the 2019 World Junior Championships

Personal information
- Full name: Avonley Claren Nguyen
- Born: November 22, 2002 (age 23) Cleveland, Ohio, U.S.
- Home town: Stone Ridge, Virginia, U.S.
- Height: 5 ft 0 in (1.53 m)

Figure skating career
- Country: United States
- Partner: Grigory Smirnov (2021–22); Vadym Kolesnik (2017–20)
- Skating club: Skating Club of New York
- Began skating: 2009

Medal record
World Junior Championships
Gold medal – first place	2020 Tallinn	Ice dance
Junior Grand Prix Final
Silver medal – second place	2019–20 Turin	Ice dance

Avonley Claren Nguyen (born November 22, 2002) is an American former ice dancer. With her former partner, Vadym Kolesnik, she is the 2020 World Junior champion, the 2019–20 Junior Grand Prix Final silver medalist, and the 2020 U.S. junior national champion. She has also won four medals on the ISU Junior Grand Prix series, including three golds, and qualified to the 2018–19 Junior Grand Prix Final.

During the 2021-2022 season, she competed with Grigory Smirnov.

== Personal life ==
Nguyen was born on November 22, 2002, in Cleveland, Ohio.

== Career ==
=== Early years ===
Nguyen began learning to skate in 2009. She began solo ice dance at age 11 and switched from singles to ice dance at the age of 12. With her first partner, Maxwell Gart, she won silver in the intermediate category at the 2016 U.S. Championships.

=== 2016–2017 season ===
In autumn 2016, Nguyen and Ukrainian ice dancer Vadym Kolesnik had a three-week tryout in Novi, Michigan, following which he returned to Ukraine for a few months. They began their partnership in February 2017.

=== 2017–2018 season ===
Nguyen/Kolesnik received their first ISU Junior Grand Prix (JGP) assignments in the 2017–2018 season. They placed fifth at JGP Belarus and sixth at JGP Italy. After taking gold in junior ice dancing at Midwestern Sectionals, they qualified to the 2018 U.S. Championships, where they would finish fifth.

=== 2018–2019 season ===
Nguyen/Kolesnik won the silver medal at 2018 JGP Lithuania, behind Russia's Arina Ushakova / Maxim Nekrasov, and the gold at 2018 JGP Slovenia to qualify for their first JGP Final. They placed fifth overall at the 2018–19 Junior Grand Prix Final after placing fifth in the rhythm dance and fifth in the free dance.

At the 2019 U.S. Championships they won the silver medal behind Caroline Green / Gordon Green after placing second in the rhythm dance and winning the free dance.

At the 2019 World Junior Championships, Nguyen/Kolesnik placed fifth in the rhythm dance, but moved up to fourth overall after placing third in the free dance. They were awarded a small bronze medal for the free, where they had the highest technical base value of any of the competing teams, and the second-highest technical score overall.

=== 2019–2020 season: World Junior champion and Junior Grand Prix Final silver ===
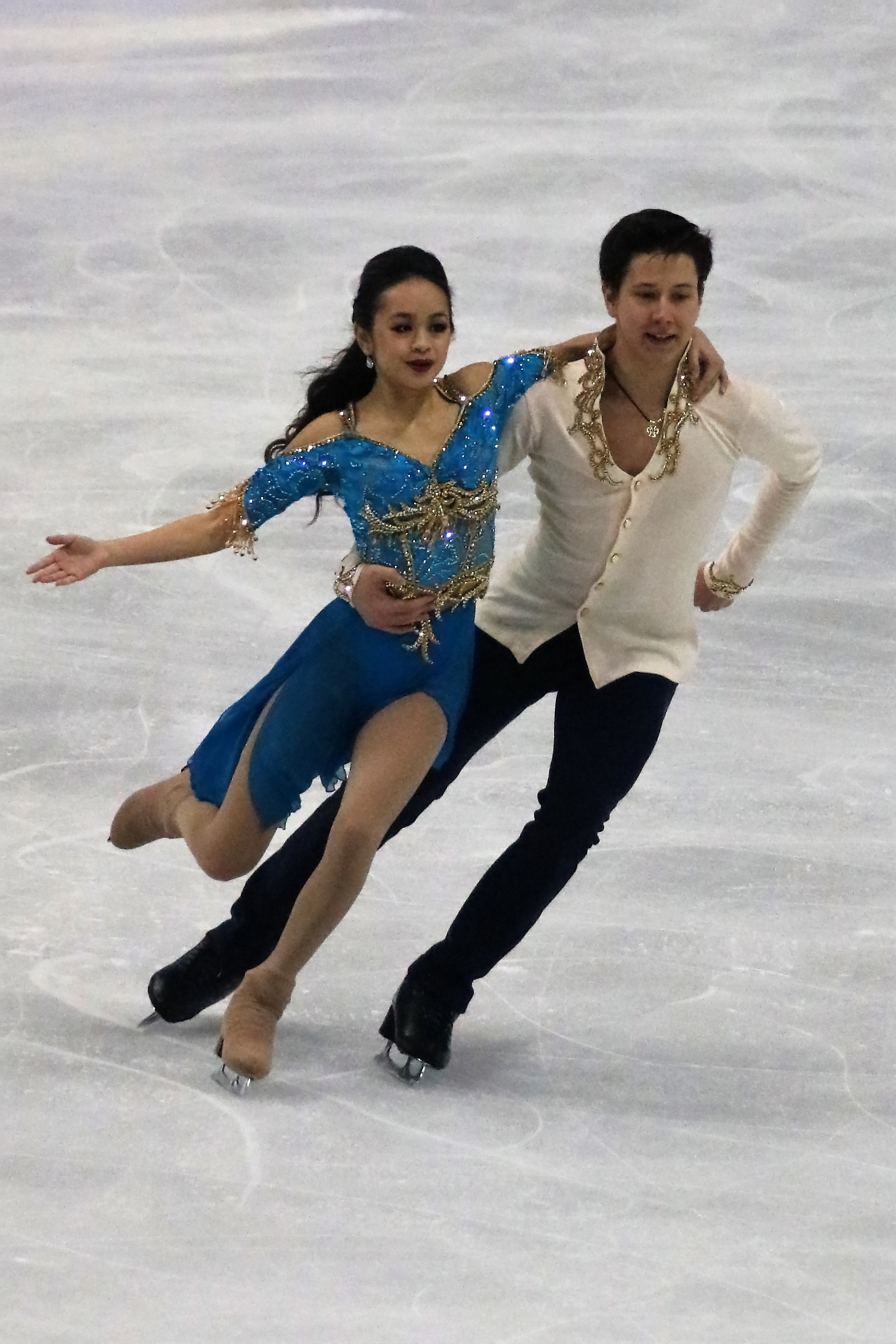
Nguyen/Kolesnik at the 2019–20 JGP Final

Nguyen/Kolesnik began their Junior Grand Prix season at the 2019 JGP United States, where they placed first in both segments with personal best scores and won the gold medal. At 2019 JGP Poland, they again set personal best scores in both segments to take the title and qualify for the 2019–20 ISU Junior Grand Prix Final. Competing at the Final, Nguyen/Kolesnik narrowly lost the gold medal by only 0.16 points behind Maria Kazakova / Georgy Reviya of Georgia at the JGP Final. She commented "we're a little disappointed right now, but we’ll continue to keep on working. All our competitors were really strong. We were only a fourth of a point behind and we felt we could push and get to the next level, but it didn’t work out."

At the 2020 U.S. Figure Skating Championships, Nguyen/Kolesnik scored 184.38 total points to take the gold medal by more than 22 points. Their free dance, set to Rachmaninoff's "Piano Concerto No. 2," featured all positive grades of execution and eight Level 4 elements, earning 109.89 points.

At the 2020 Bavarian Open, they placed first in both the rhythm dance and free dance to win the gold medal. They concluded the season at the 2020 World Junior Championships in Tallinn, Estonia, where they entered as one of the favorites for the title. Nguyen/Kolesnik placed third in the rhythm dance, behind Shanaeva/Naryzhnyy and Kazakova/Reviya, after Nguyen stepped out of her twizzle sequence. She remarked that they had "left a few points on the table, but now we'll focus on the free dance." They won the free dance, setting a new junior world record and taking the Junior World title over Kazakova/Reviya. Nguyen said afterward "I've dreamed about this moment for so long and to know that our work finally paid off, it just feels great!" Kolesnik indicated that they had not decided whether to move up to senior competition or remain at the junior level for another season.

At the end of June, Nguyen announced that the two had split. She said she had "many happy memories" of their partnership, and wished him the best as they "pursued different paths." She said she was going to look for a new partner who shared her "passion, dedication and commitment" to the sport. Within minutes, Kolesnik's announcement post followed. He thanked Nguyen "for all you have done for our partnership," expressed his admiration for her, and wished her all the best.

=== 2020–2022 seasons ===
Nguyen did not compete during the 2020–2021 season. In September 2021, it was confirmed that she and Russian ice dancer Grigory Smirnov had teamed up for the United States after Smirnov's former partner, Anastasia Shpilevaya, was forced to retire. They were scheduled to make their U.S. Championship debut in January 2022, but withdrew after Smirnov suffered a hip injury.

== Programs ==
=== Ice dance with Grigory Smirnov ===
Season	Rhythm dance	Free dance	Exhibition
2021–2022	I Want It That Way; Everybody (Backstreet's Back) by Backstreet Boys	Dusk Till Dawn by Zayn ft. Sia	

=== Ice dance with Vadym Kolesnik ===
Season	Short dance	Free dance	Exhibition
2017–18	Cha Cha: Eres Todo en Mí by Ana Gabriel; Mambo: Mambo Jambo by Pérez Prado choreo. by Igor Shpilband	West Side Story by Leonard Bernstein choreo. by Igor Shpilband	
	Rhythm dance	Free dance	Exhibition
2018–19	Argentine Tango: Vuelvo al Sur by Astor Piazzolla performed by Amelita Baltar; Argentine Tango: Building the Bullet by Luis Bacalov choreo. by Igor Shpilband, Pasquale Camerlengo	Demons by Imagine Dragons performed by Jennifer Thompson, Boyce Ave; Experience by Ludovico Einaudi choreo. by Igor Shpilband, Pasquale Camerlengo	Demons by Imagine Dragons performed by Jennifer Thompson, Boyce Ave
2019–20	Swing, Foxtrot, Swing: Aladdin by Alan Menken choreo. by Igor Shpilband, Pasquale Camerlengo	Piano Concerto No. 2 by Sergei Rachmaninoff choreo. by Igor Shpilband, Pasquale Camerlengo	

== Competitive highlights ==
- JGP – Event of the ISU Junior Grand Prix Series

=== Ice dance with Vadym Kolesnik ===
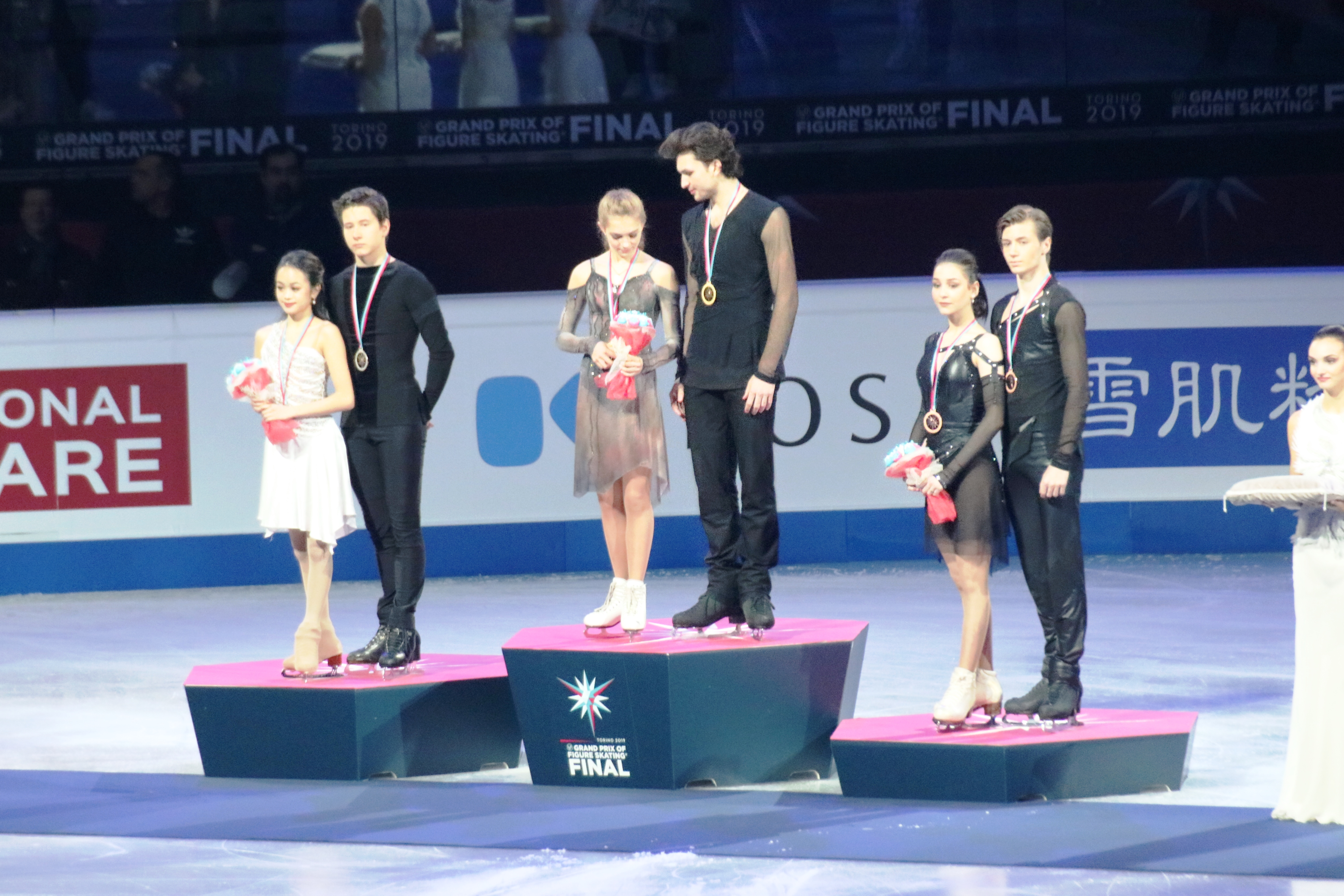
Nguyen & Kolesnik (left) with Kazakova & Reviya (center) and Shanaeva & Naryzhnyy (right) on the 2019–20 Junior Grand Prix Final podium

Competition placements at junior level
Season	2017–18	2018–19	2019–20
World Junior Championships		4th	1st
Junior Grand Prix Final		5th	2nd
U.S. Championships	5th	2nd	1st
JGP Belarus	5th		
JGP Italy	6th		
JGP Lithuania		2nd	
JGP Poland			1st
JGP Slovenia		1st	
JGP United States			1st
Bavarian Open			1st

== Detailed results ==
=== Ice dance with Vadym Kolesnik ===
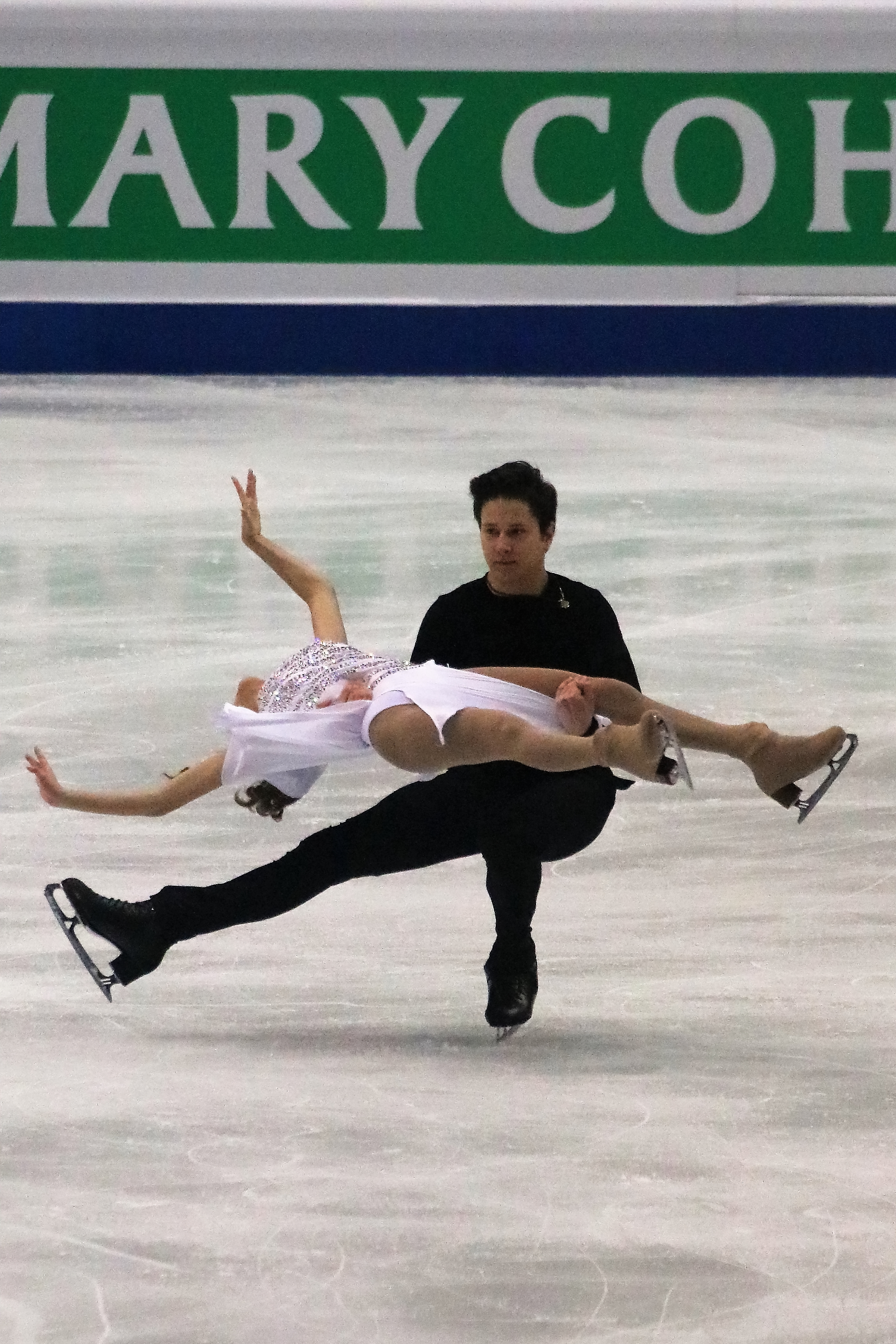
Nguyen and Kolesnik at the 2019–20 Junior Grand Prix Final

Results in the 2017–18 season
Date	Event	SD		FD		Total	
Date	Event	P	Score	P	Score	P	Score
Sep 20–23, 2017	(Belgium) 2017 JGP Belarus	5	50.37	6	64.52	5	114.89
Oct 11–14, 2017	2017 JGP Italy	6	52.84	6	72.46	6	125.30
Dec 28, 2017 – Jan 7, 2018	(United States) 2018 U.S. Championships (Junior)	7	54.02	4	80.29	5	134.31

Results in the 2018–19 season
Date	Event	RD		FD		Total	
Date	Event	P	Score	P	Score	P	Score
Sep 5–9, 2018	2018 JGP Lithuania	2	63.40	2	98.44	2	161.84
Oct 3–6, 2018	2018 JGP Slovenia	1	65.41	1	100.22	1	165.63
Dec 7–12, 2018	(Canada) 2018–19 Junior Grand Prix Final	5	63.73	5	94.74	5	158.47
Jan 18–27, 2019	(United States) 2019 U.S. Championships (Junior)	2	65.92	1	105.14	2	171.06
Mar 4–10, 2019	(Croatia) 2019 World Junior Championships	5	65.18	3	102.72	4	167.90

Results in the 2019–20 season
Date	Event	RD		FD		Total	
Date	Event	P	Score	P	Score	P	Score
Aug 28–31, 2019	2019 JGP United States	1	66.17	1	104.63	1	170.80
Sep 18–21, 2019	2019 JGP Poland	1	69.20	1	105.48	1	174.68
Dec 5–8, 2019	(Italy) 2019–20 Junior Grand Prix Final	2	68.72	2	106.02	2	174.74
Jan 20–26, 2020	(United States) 2020 U.S. Championships (junior)	1	74.49	1	109.89	1	184.38
Feb 3–9, 2020	(Germany) 2020 Bavarian Open	1	64.13	1	101.33	1	165.46
Mar 2–8, 2020	(Estonia) 2020 World Junior Championships	3	68.27	1	108.91	1	177.18
