= Vadym Kolesnik =

American ice dancer (born 2001)

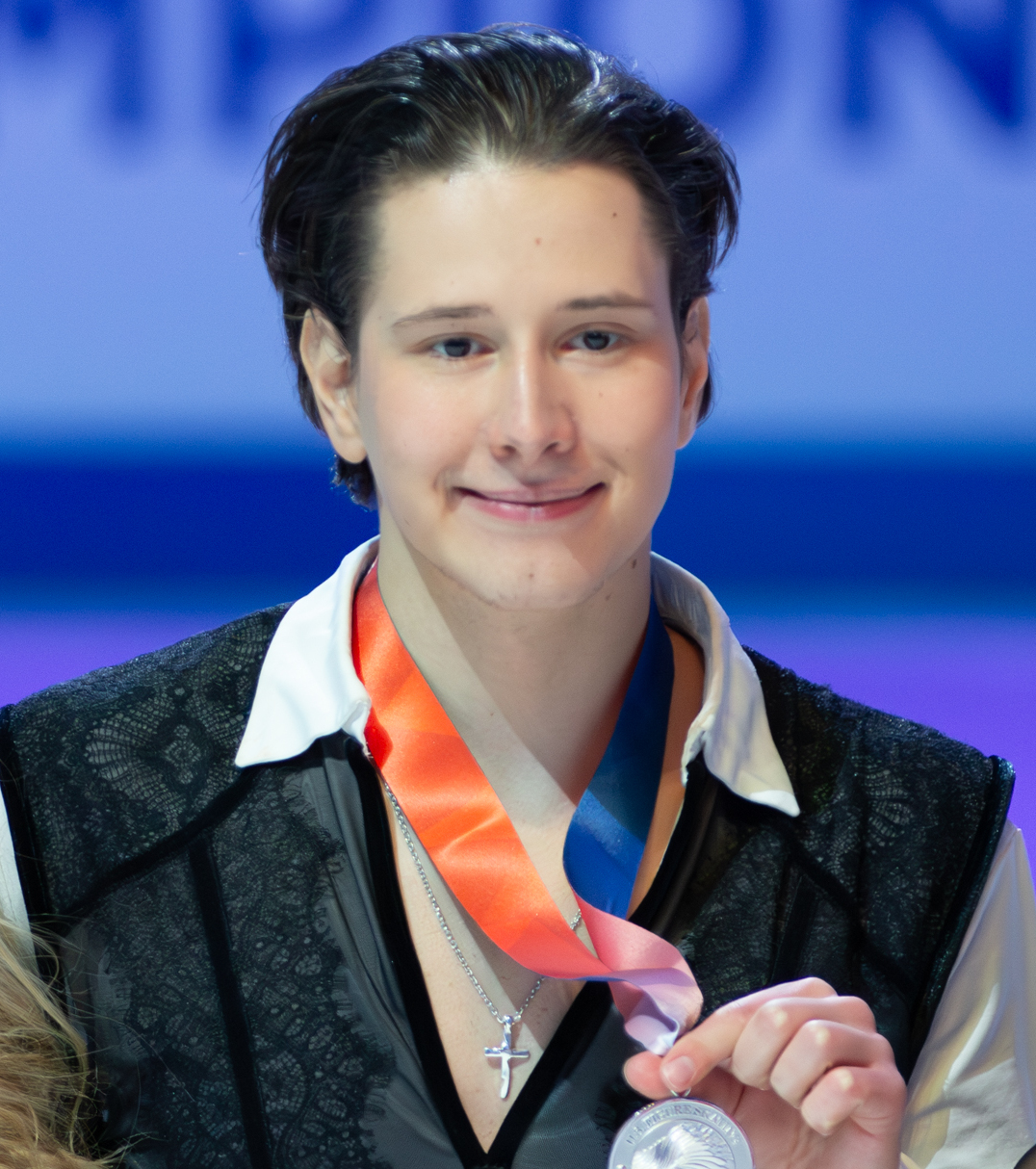
- Vadym Kolesnik at the 2026 U.S. Championships

Personal information
- Native name: Вадим Колесник
- Born: October 27, 2001 (age 25) Kharkiv, Ukraine
- Home town: Novi, Michigan, U.S.
- Height: 5 ft 9 in (1.75 m)

Figure skating career
- Country: United States
- Partner: Emilea Zingas (since 2022); Avonley Nguyen (2017–20)
- Coach: Igor Shpilband; Natalia Deller; Adrienne Lenda; Pasquale Camerlengo
- Skating club: Skating Club of New York
- Began skating: 2006

Medal record
World Championships
Bronze medal – third place	2026 Prague	Ice dance
Four Continents Championships
Gold medal – first place	2026 Beijing	Ice dance
U.S. Championships
Silver medal – second place	2026 St. Louis	Ice dance
World Junior Championships
Gold medal – first place	2020 Tallinn	Ice dance
Junior Grand Prix Final
Silver medal – second place	2019–20 Turin	Ice dance

Vadym Kolesnik (Note: Ukrainian: Вадим Колесник, romanized: Vadym Kolesnyk) (Ukrainian: Вадим Колесник; born October 27, 2001) is an American ice dancer. With his skating partner, Emilea Zingas, he is a 2026 World Championships bronze medalist, a 2026 Four Continents champion, two-time Grand Prix medalist, a five-time Challenger Series medalist, the 2026 U.S. National silver medalist, and the 2023, 2025 U.S. national pewter medalist. Zingas and Kolesnik represented the United States at the 2026 Winter Olympics.

With his former partner, Avonley Nguyen, he is the 2020 World Junior champion, the 2019–20 Junior Grand Prix Final silver medalist, and the 2020 U.S. junior national champion. He has also won four medals on the ISU Junior Grand Prix series, including three golds, and qualified to the 2018–19 Junior Grand Prix Final.

== Personal life ==
Kolesnik was born on October 27, 2001, in Kharkiv, Ukraine. He has an older brother, Igor. In the spring of 2017, at the age of fifteen, he moved to Detroit, United States. He initially lived with the family of his former ice dance partner, Avonley Nguyen, before moving out at age eighteen. He became an American citizen in the summer of 2025.

Additionally, he is a Kharkiv State Academy of Physical Culture alumnus, having a master's degree in sports education and sports psychology.

Kolesnik has spoken in support of Ukraine following the Russian invasion of Ukraine in 2022. As a result of the war, his father lost his appliance and lighting business while his brother enlisted in the Ukrainian army. He has also advocated for the exclusion of Russia from the Olympic Games due to their ongoing conflict with Ukraine and their continued doping practices in sports.

Since 2022, Kolesnik has been in a relationship with his ice dance partner, Emilea Zingas.

== Career ==
=== Early years ===
Kolesnik began learning to skate as a four-year-old after his grandmother took him to a local rink. The coaches at the rink did not wish to take him due to his weight, but he kept returning until one accepted him. In the 2015–2016 season, he appeared internationally with Zlata Iefymenko for Ukraine. Competing in advanced novice ice dancing, they placed ninth at the 2015 Ice Star and then fourth at the 2015 NRW Trophy.

=== Partnership with Avonley Nguyen ===
==== 2017–2018 season: Debut of Nguyen/Kolesnik ====
In autumn 2016, Kolesnik and Avonley Nguyen of the United States had a three-week tryout in Novi, Michigan, following which he returned to Ukraine for a few months. They began their partnership in February 2017.

Nguyen/Kolesnik received their first ISU Junior Grand Prix (JGP) assignments in the 2017–2018 season. They placed fifth at JGP Belarus and sixth at JGP Italy. After taking gold in junior ice dancing at Midwestern Sectionals, they qualified to the 2018 U.S. Championships, where they would finish fifth.

==== 2018–2019 season: Two Junior Grand Prix medals ====
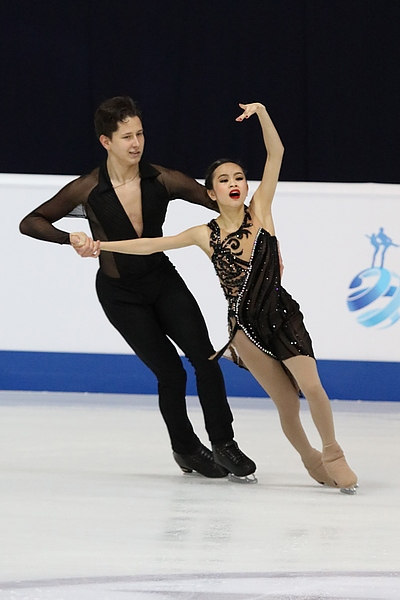
Nguyen/Kolesnik at the 2019 World Junior Championships

Nguyen/Kolesnik won the silver medal at 2018 JGP Lithuania, behind Russia's Ushakova/Nekrasov, and the gold at 2018 JGP Slovenia to qualify for their first JGP Final. They placed fifth overall at the 2018–19 Junior Grand Prix Final after placing fifth in the rhythm dance and fifth in the free dance.

At the 2019 U.S. Championships, they won the silver medal behind Green/Green after placing second in the rhythm dance and winning the free dance.

At the 2019 World Junior Championships, Nguyen/Kolesnik placed fifth in the rhythm dance but moved up to fourth overall after placing third in the free dance. They were awarded a small bronze medal for the free, where they had the highest technical base value of any of the competing teams and the second-highest technical score overall.

==== 2019–2020 season: World Junior champion, Junior Grand Prix Final silver and U.S. junior national champion ====
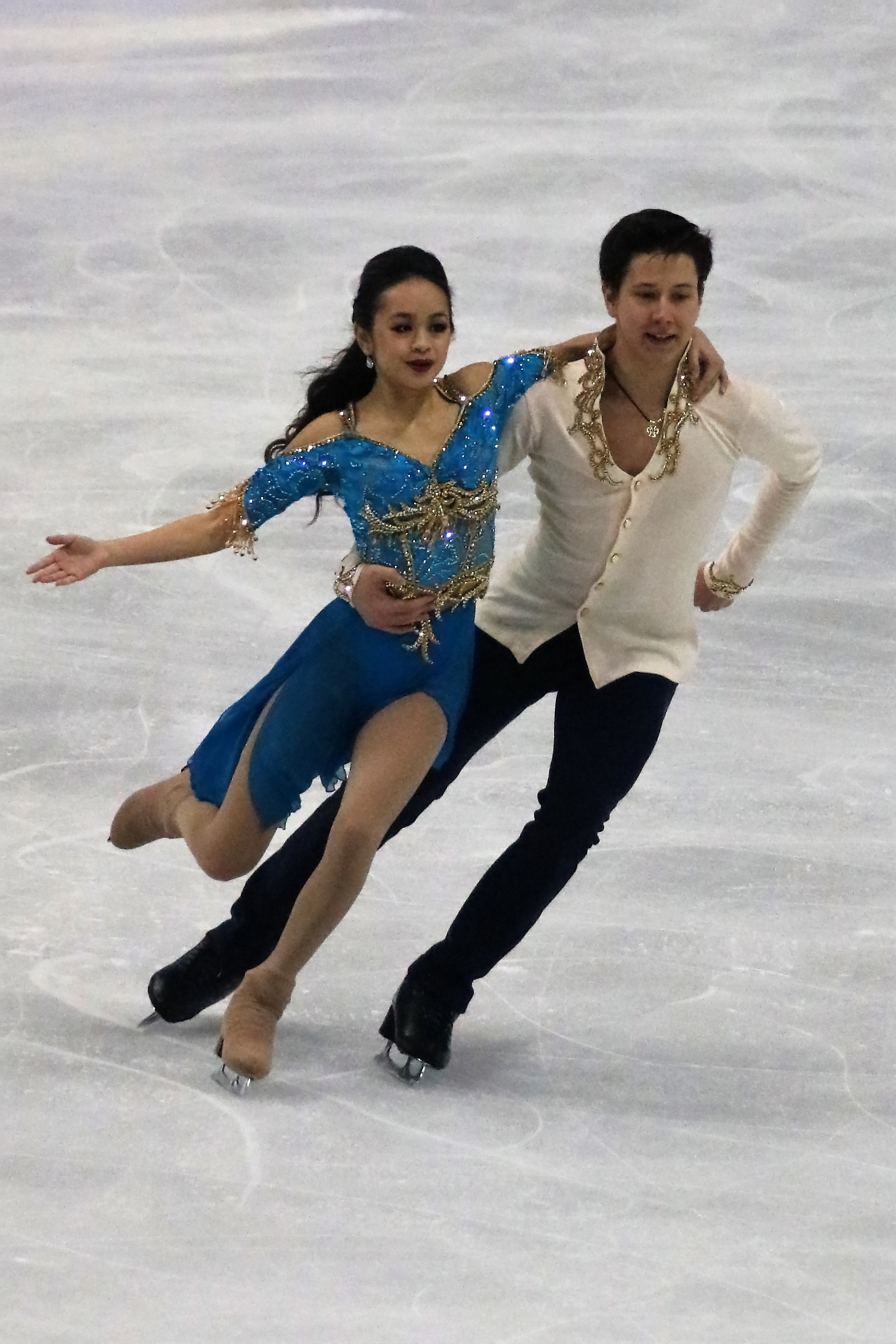
Nguyen/Kolesnik at the 2019–20 JGP Final

Nguyen/Kolesnik began their Junior Grand Prix season at the 2019 JGP United States, where they placed first in both segments with personal best scores and won the gold medal. At 2019 JGP Poland, they again set personal best scores in both segments to take the title and qualify for the 2019–20 ISU Junior Grand Prix Final. Competing at the Final, Nguyen/Kolesnik narrowly lost the gold medal by only 0.16 points behind Kazakova/Reviya of Georgia at the JGP Final. She commented "we're a little disappointed right now, but we’ll continue to keep on working. All our competitors were really strong. We were only a fourth of a point behind, and we felt we could push and get to the next level, but it didn’t work out."

At the 2020 U.S. Figure Skating Championships, Nguyen/Kolesnik scored 184.38 total points to take the gold medal by more than 22 points. Their free dance, set to Rachmaninoff's "Piano Concerto No. 2," featured all positive grades of execution and eight Level 4 elements, earning 109.89 points.

At the 2020 Bavarian Open, they placed first in both the rhythm dance and free dance to win the gold medal. They concluded the season at the 2020 World Junior Championships in Tallinn, Estonia, where they entered as one of the favorites for the title. Nguyen/Kolesnik placed third in the rhythm dance behind Shanaeva/Naryzhnyy and Kazakova/Reviya, after Nguyen stepped out of her twizzle sequence. She remarked they had "left a few points on the table, but now we'll focus on the free dance." They won the free dance, setting a new junior world record and taking the Junior World title over Kazakova/Reviya. Nguyen said afterward, "I've dreamed about this moment for so long and to know that our work finally paid off, it just feels great!" Kolesnik indicated that they had not decided whether to move up to senior competition or remain at the junior level for another season.

At the end of June, Nguyen announced that the two had split. She said she had "many happy memories" of their partnership and wished him the best as they "pursued different paths." Within minutes, Kolesnik's announcement post followed. He thanked Nguyen "for all you have done for our partnership," expressed his admiration for her, and wished her all the best.

=== Partnership with Emilea Zingas ===
==== 2022–2023 season: Debut of Zingas/Kolesnik ====
After many months of searching for a new permanent partnership in the midst of the COVID-19 pandemic, Kolesnik tried out with Cypriot-American singles skater Emilea Zingas. Kolesnik would later say that "the first time I skated with Emilea I felt something special. I felt like I can be myself. She opens up in the way that I want to skate and that's how it comes out — freedom." On May 15, 2022, Zingas officially announced that the two would compete together representing the United States.

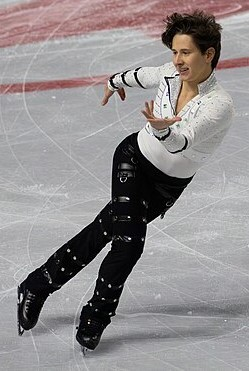
Kolesnik during the rhythm dance at 2023 Skate Canada International

Zingas/Kolesnik made their international debut in December 2022 at 2022 CS Golden Spin of Zagreb, where they won the bronze medal.

After winning gold in November 2022 at the U.S. Ice Dance Final to qualify for the 2023 U.S. Championships, the team entered a dance field more open than normal due to presumptive national silver medalists Hawayek/Baker being absent due to health issues. Zingas/Kolesnik unexpectedly placed third in the rhythm dance, less than a point ahead of Zagreb gold medalists Carreira/Ponomarenko, who had erred on their twizzles. After the free dance, Carreira/Ponomarenko had squeaked ahead overall by 0.32, but Zingas/Kolesnik stood on the podium as pewter medalists, a noteworthy achievement in a team's first season. Kolesnik said of the new partnership "I think we've got a match."

==== 2023–2024 season: Grand Prix and Four Continents debut ====
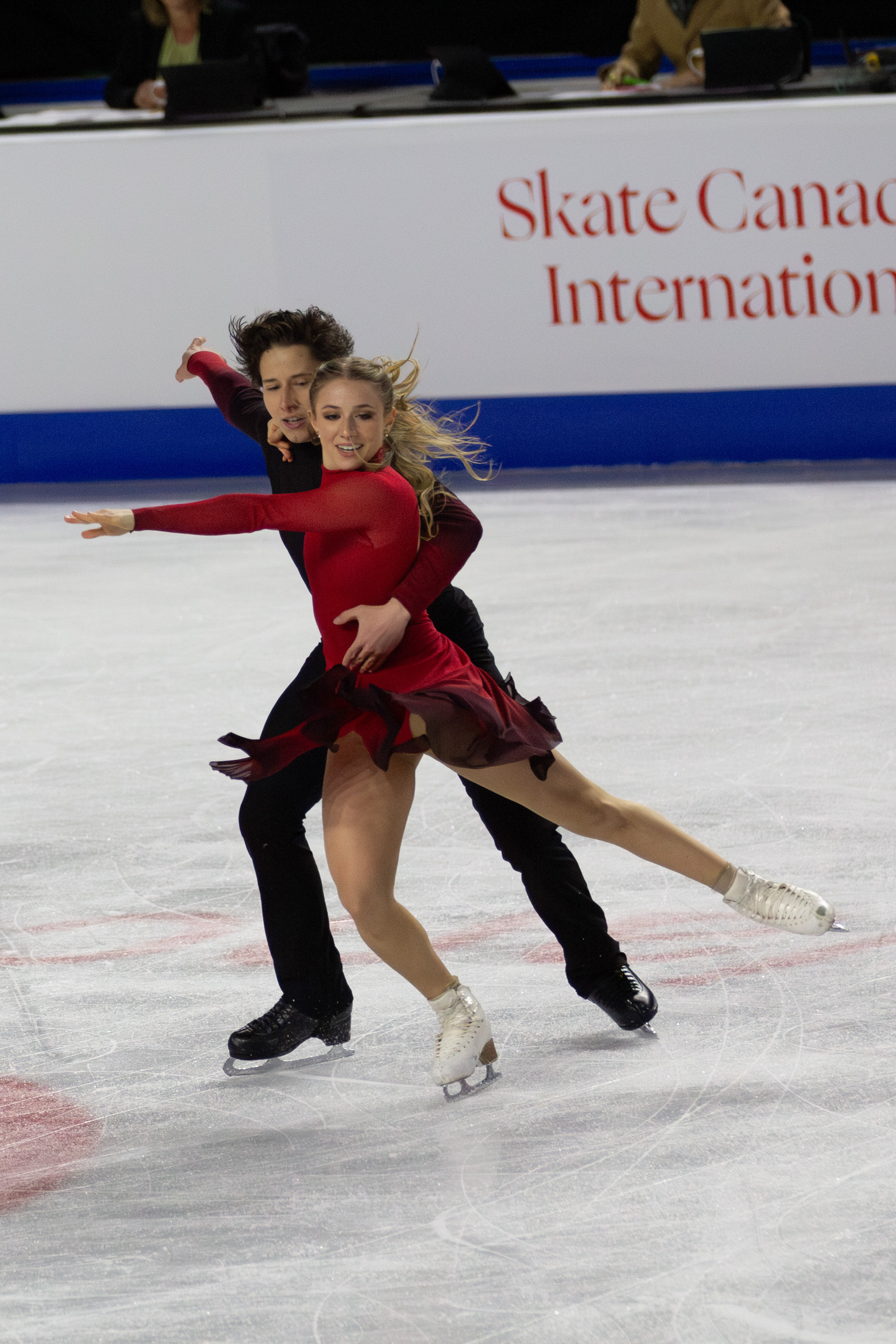
Zingas/Kolesnik during their free dance at 2023 Skate Canada International

For their free dance, Zingas proposed skating to Alan Menken's Beauty and the Beast film score, which Kolesnik was persuaded of after a "watch party".

Beginning the season on the Challenger circuit, Zingas/Kolesnik finished fourth at the 2023 CS Nepela Memorial. They were invited to make their Grand Prix debut at 2023 Skate Canada International, where they placed fifth, despite a rhythm dance twizzle error. They were fifth as well at the 2023 Grand Prix of Espoo. Zingas/Kolesnik finished out the fall season at the 2023 CS Golden Spin of Zagreb, where they won the silver medal.

In advance of the 2024 U.S. Championships, Zingas/Kolesnik were named as first alternates for the American team for the 2024 Four Continents Championships in Shanghai.

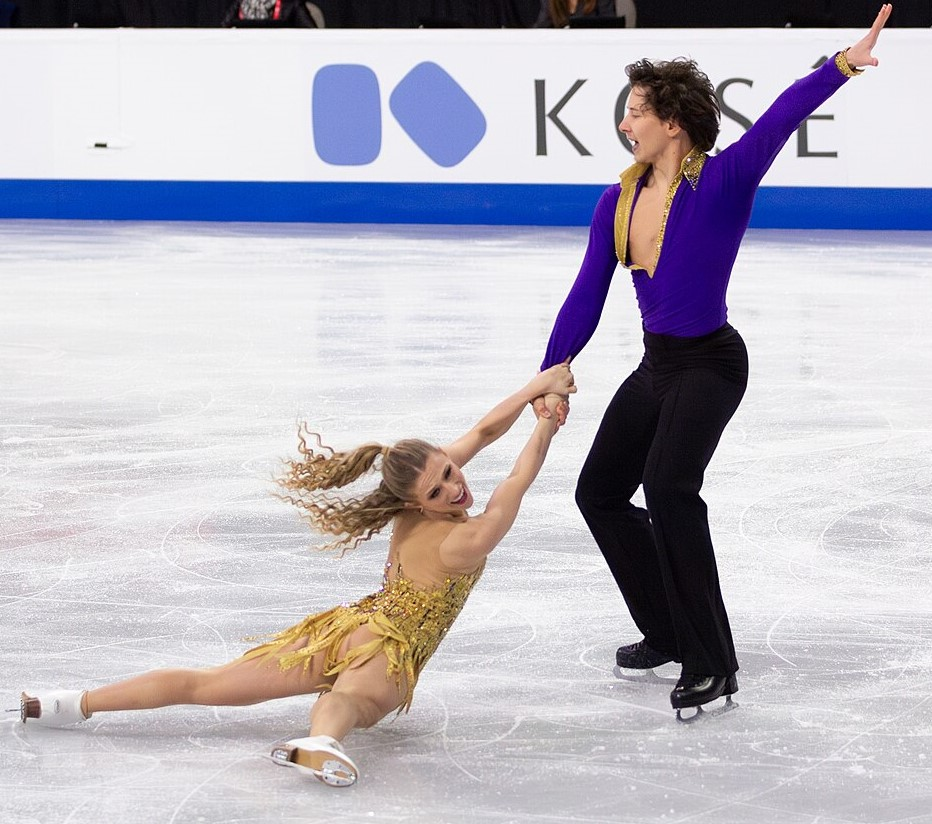
Zingas/Kolesnik performing their rhythm dance at 2024 Skate Canada International

They finished only sixth at the national championships, but were notified while driving home that national champions Chock/Bates had withdrawn from the Four Continents Championships due to illness, and they were to fly to Shanghai the following morning. They were fourth in both segments of the competition, coming fourth overall, 1.07 points back of bronze medalists Carreira/Ponomarenko. Zingas called the event "a great bonus".

==== 2024–2025 season ====
Zingas/Kolesnik started the season by winning bronze at the 2024 CS Nebelhorn Trophy. Beginning the 2024–25 Grand Prix series at 2024 Skate Canada International, they came fourth in the rhythm dance, 1.13 points behind third-place French team Lopareva/Brissaud. Both partners received low levels on their twizzles in the free dance, and they dropped to fifth overall, which Kolesnik called "very disappointing." They followed this up by finishing fifth at the 2024 Finlandia Trophy. "We are happy though that we could finish this competition on a high note with a good free dance," said Zingas.

In January, Zingas/Kolesnik competed at the 2025 U.S. Championships, where they placed third in the rhythm dance and fourth in the free dance, finishing fourth overall. “I think we did the best we could,” said Zingas. “It was a challenging season overall, and we’ve been dealing with some things on and off the ice. I'm really proud of how we handled ourselves, and I think we’ve shown a lot of growth and more maturity from last year to this year. I'm really proud, especially with Vadym. He is a very strong person, and I'm really happy to skate with him.”

They then closed the season with a fifth-place finish at the 2025 Four Continents Championships in Seoul, South Korea. “I'm happy with what we’ve done today,” said Kolesnik after the free dance. “I think we just wanted to skate our best and give justice to this program because we love it. We enjoy doing it and I feel like no matter how we skated, we just wanted to enjoy this process and today I felt like we accomplished it.”

==== 2025–2026 season: Milano Cortina Olympics, World bronze, Four Continents gold, two Grand Prix medals and U.S. national silver medal ====
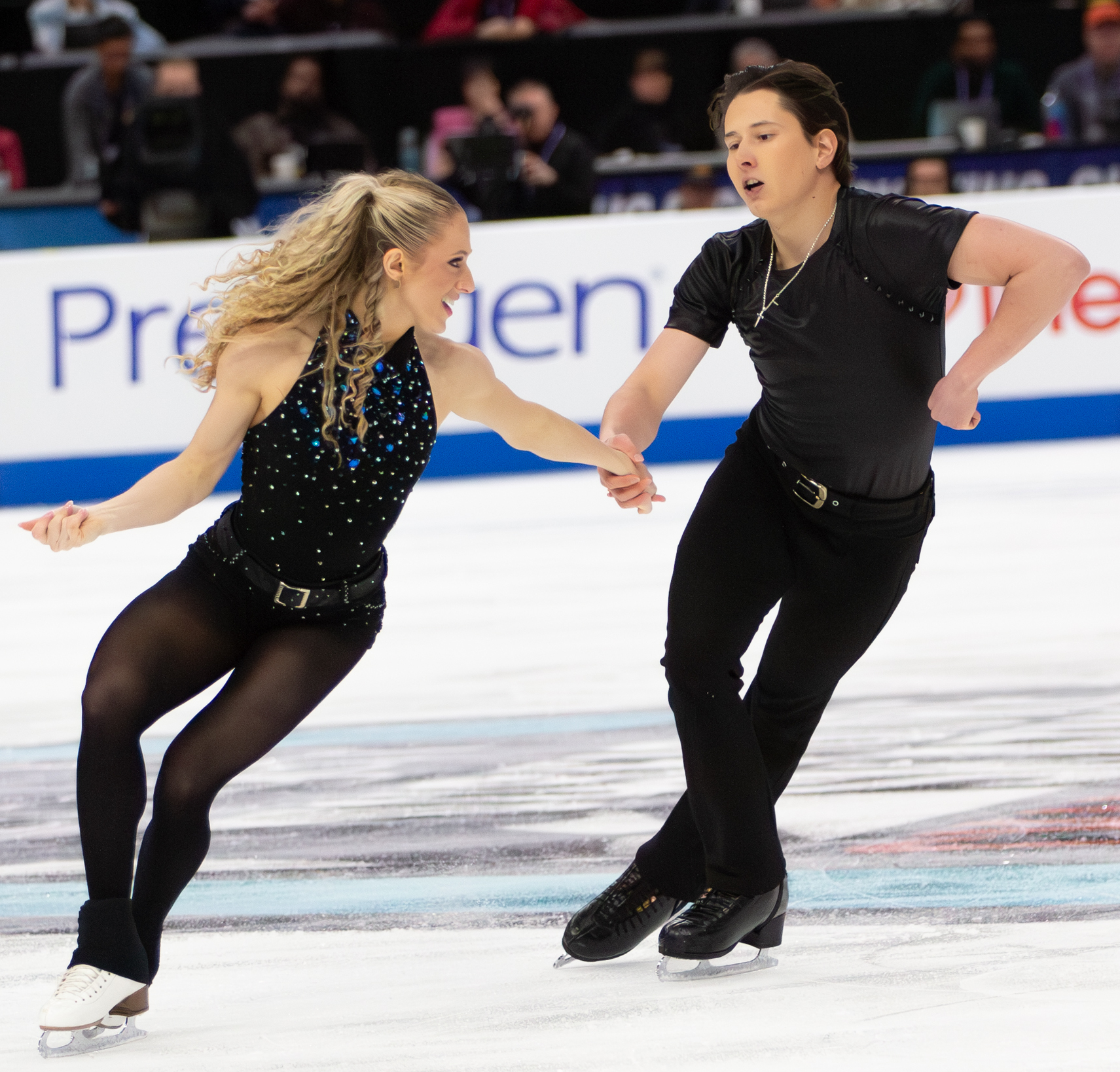
Zingas and Kolesnik during their rhythm dance at the 2026 U.S. Championships

Zingas/Kolesnik opened their season by winning silver at the 2025 CS Kinoshita Group Cup. They subsequently went on to compete on the 2025–26 Grand Prix circuit, winning their first Grand Prix medal, a silver, at the 2025 Cup of China. Both ice dancers were happy to have broken the 80-point mark in the Rhythm Dance. Speaking on the result following the event, Kolesnik shared, "I feel like I won the Olympics right now, but I'm just second at a Grand Prix. But that's how I feel. I feel so much happiness and joy inside of me right now. I can't even describe it with words. I'm just so happy that we went out there with all this pressure that we never had before."

The following month Zingas/Kolesnik won the bronze at 2025 Finlandia Trophy, qualifying for the 2025–26 Grand Prix Final. "I’m in shock! I think we’re still shaking a little," said Zingas after the free dance. "Just because before the skate, I wanted it so badly. I wasn’t thinking too much about the Final until we got here, and everybody started asking us questions about it and stuff. And I love Japan; I so much wanted to go to Japan."

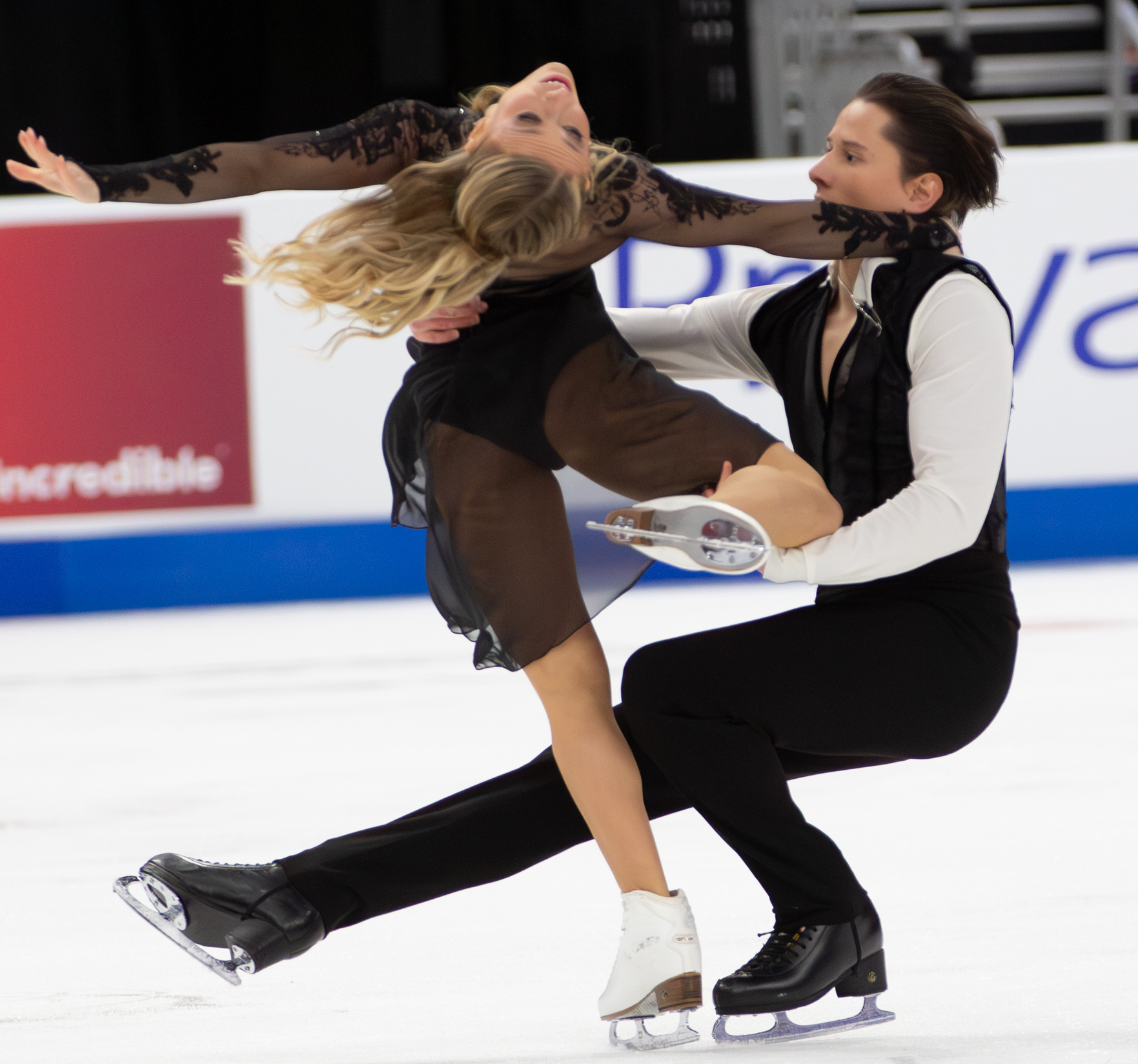
Zingas and Kolesnik performing a spin during their free dance at the 2026 U.S. Championships

In December, Zingas/Kolesnik competed at the 2025–26 Grand Prix Final where they placed sixth. “I think the crowd was amazing today,” said Zingas after the free dance. “We feel really grateful we have this opportunity. Today we did make a mistake and it’s kind of an uncharacteristic mistake for us. So, we will drill it when we get home and work to make everything the best we can and improve before the national championships."

The following month, Zingas/Kolesnik won the silver medal at the 2026 U.S. Championships behind Chock/Bates. "This is an extremely special event for us," said Zingas. "Last year at this time, we experienced some disappointment at the U.S. Championships, and honestly, I feel grateful for that moment because it taught me to know what I want and taught me how I don’t want to feel after a national championship." They were subsequently named to the 2026 Winter Olympic team.

Less than two weeks later, Zingas/Kolesnik won gold at the 2026 Four Continents Figure Skating Championships in their third appearance at this event. “It’s been a great season; we had so much fun,” Zingas summed up. “Every competition this season, I think we just tried to forget about the expectation and just skate our absolute best."

Before leaving for the Winter Olympics, Kolesnik and Zingas set up a GoFundMe page to raise enough money to fly Kolesnik's family members from Ukraine to Milan, so that they could watch him and Zingas compete. The duo ultimately raised over twenty-five thousand dollars, surpassing their page's goal. As a result, Kolesnik was able to fly his aunt, Snezhana, and sister-in-law, Irina, two family members that he had not been able to see in four years due to the Russo-Ukrainian war. However, Kolesnik's mother was forced to stay behind in the U.S due to concerns of immigration policies under Trump's second administration.

On 9 February, Zingas/Kolesnik competed in the rhythm dance segment at the 2026 Winter Olympics, placing sixth in that segment and scoring a personal best. "I've never been so peaceful with myself than I am at this competition," said Kolesnik following their performance. "I don't know how to even explain this. I mean, I know it's Olympic stage, and for many people, this is the moment of their lives. I just thought of it as a test challenge for our next eight years, because this is just the beginning for us, and we're going to reach higher places. So I wanted to have good experience, and I couldn't ask for more."

Two days later, Zingas/Kolesnik placed fifth in the free dance segment, earning another personal best and finishing fifth overall. "I mean, this is crazy! We’re top five at the Olympics!" said Zingas. "This is absolutely insane! If you told me one year ago today that I’d be top five at the Olympics, I would have said, ‘No, it’s a lie. It’s a straight-up lie.’"

The following month, Zingas/Kolesnik competed at the 2026 World Figure Skating Championships where they won the bronze in their debut at this event after earning all-new personal best scores. “My brain is still processing what’s happening,” said Zingas. “All I can say is that I’m just so full of joy, and it’s a miracle night for us. I’m so excited, and I’m so grateful to be sitting up here with these guys. It feels so real, surreal.”

==== 2026–2027 season: First Grand Prix gold ====
Zingas and Kolesnik opened their season at 2026 Skate America where they claimed their first Grand Prix gold medal. “It feels really amazing to be given the gold medal,” said Zingas. “For the start of the season and for these programs being much more challenging than our last year programs, I’m really excited and I’m really happy. I feel the growth will come as the season progresses.”

== Programs ==
=== Ice dance with Emilea Zingas ===
Season	Rhythm dance	Free dance	Exhibition
2022–23	Conga by Gloria Estefan and the Miami Sound Machine; Tan Sola by Sole Giménez; Conga performed by Meek Mill choreo. by Igor Shpilband	Metamorphosis II; Violin Concerto No. 1; Truman Sleeps by Philip Glass choreo. by Igor Shpilband	
2023–24	Another Part of Me; Liberian Girl; Smooth Criminal by Michael Jackson choreo. by Igor Shpilband	Beauty and the Beast; Main Title Prologue; Transformations; Overture by Alan Menken; Evermore by Alan Menken & Tim Rice performed by Josh Groban choreo. by Igor Shpilband	Conga by Gloria Estefan and the Miami Sound Machine; Tan Sola by Sole Giménez; Conga performed by Meek Mill choreo. by Igor Shpilband
2024–25	Jive Talkin'; Stayin' Alive; You Should Be Dancing by Bee Gees choreo. by Igor Shpilband	Epilogue by Ólafur Arnalds; Lost It to Trying by Son Lux choreo. by Benoît Richaud	Jive Talkin'; Stayin' Alive; You Should Be Dancing by Bee Gees choreo. by Igor Shpilband
2025–26	Poison; Something in Your Eyes; Poison by Bell Biv DeVoe choreo. by Igor Shpilband	Romeo and Juliet by Sergei Prokofiev; Op. 64: XIII. Dance of the Knights performed by Mark Ermler & Orchestra of the Royal Opera House, Covent Garden; Op. 64: 52. Juliet's Death performed by Boston Symphony Orchestra & Seiji Ozawa; Op. 64: XIII. Dance of the Knights performed by Mark Ermler & Orchestra of the Royal Opera House, Covent Garden choreo. by Benoît Richaud	Work Song by Hozier; Christmas Eve / Sarajevo 12/24 by Mykola Leontovych] performed by Trans-Siberian Orchestra; Thrift Shop; Downtown by Macklemore & Ryan Lewis
2026–27		Boléro; Composed by Maurice Ravel choreo. by Benoît Richaud	

=== Ice dance with Avonley Nguyen ===
Season	Short dance	Free dance	Exhibition
2017–18	Cha Cha: Eres Todo en Mí by Ana Gabriel; Mambo: Mambo Jambo by Pérez Prado choreo. by Igor Shpilband	West Side Story by Leonard Bernstein choreo. by Igor Shpilband	
	Rhythm dance	Free dance	Exhibition
2018–19	Argentine Tango: Vuelvo al Sur by Astor Piazzolla performed by Amelita Baltar; Argentine Tango: Building the Bullet by Luis Bacalov choreo. by Igor Shpilband, Pasquale Camerlengo	Demons by Imagine Dragons performed by Jennifer Thompson, Boyce Ave; Experience by Ludovico Einaudi choreo. by Igor Shpilband, Pasquale Camerlengo	Demons by Imagine Dragons performed by Jennifer Thompson, Boyce Ave
2019–20	Swing, Foxtrot, Swing: Aladdin by Alan Menken choreo. by Igor Shpilband, Pasquale Camerlengo	Piano Concerto No. 2 by Sergei Rachmaninoff choreo. by Igor Shpilband, Pasquale Camerlengo	

== Competitive highlights ==
- GP – Event of the ISU Grand Prix Series
- JGP – Event of the ISU Junior Grand Prix Series
- CS – Event of the ISU Challenger Series
- TBD – Assigned
- WD – Withdrew from competition

=== Ice dance with Emilea Zingas ===
Competition placements at senior level
Season	2022–23	2023–24	2024–25	2025–26	2026–27
Winter Olympics				5th	
World Championships				3rd	
Four Continents Championships		4th	5th	1st	
Grand Prix Final				6th	
U.S. Championships	4th	6th	4th	2nd	
GP Cup of China				2nd	
GP Finland		5th	5th	3rd	
GP NHK Trophy					TBD
GP Skate America					1st
GP Skate Canada		5th	5th		
CS Golden Spin	3rd	2nd			
CS Kinoshita Group Cup				2nd	
CS Nebelhorn Trophy			3rd		
CS Nepela Memorial		4th			
CS Warsaw Cup			2nd		

=== Ice dance with Avonley Nguyen ===
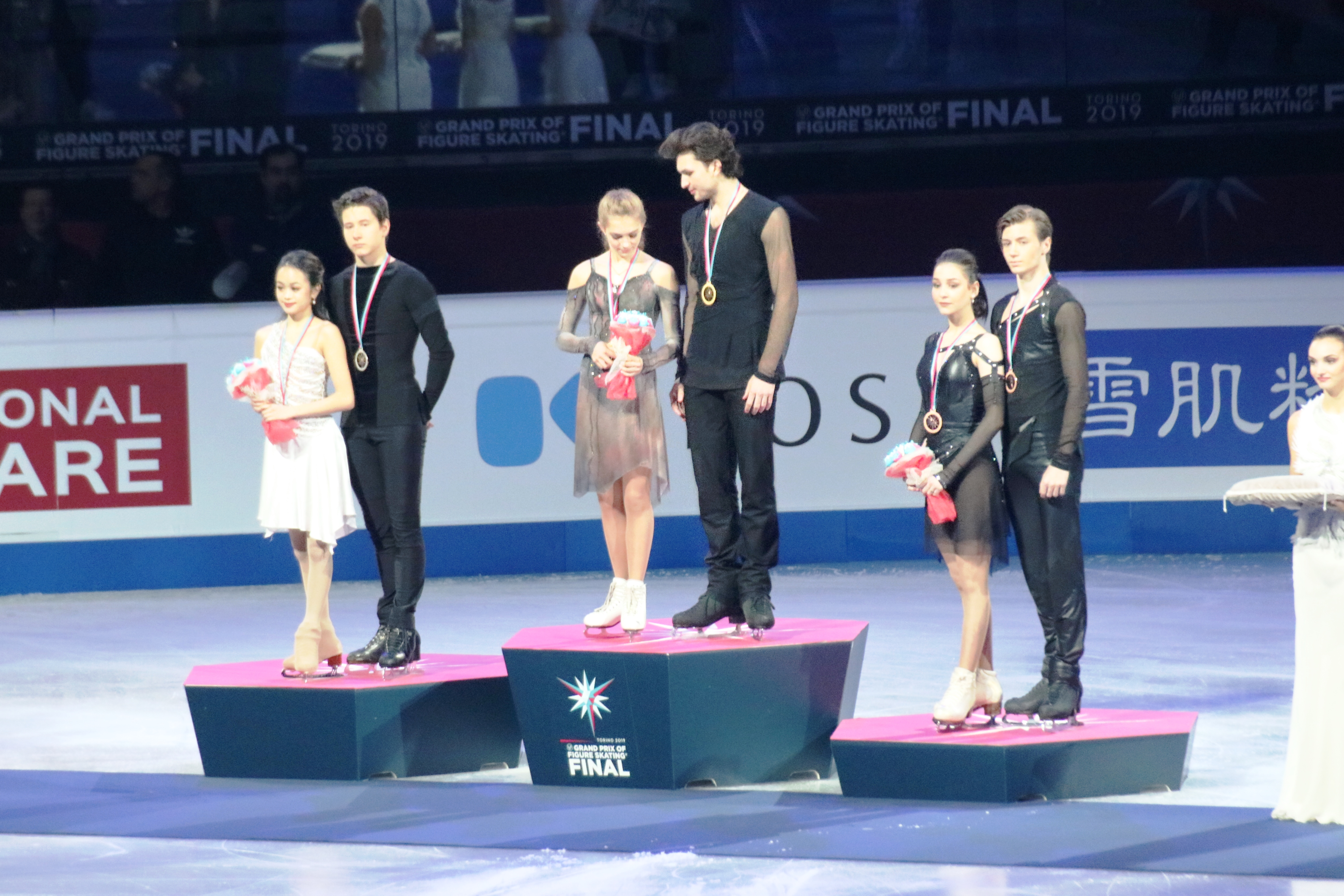
Nguyen & Kolesnik (left) with Kazakova & Reviya (center) and Shanaeva & Naryzhnyy (right) on the 2019–20 Junior Grand Prix Final podium

Competition placements at junior level
Season	2017–18	2018–19	2019–20
World Junior Championships		4th	1st
Junior Grand Prix Final		5th	2nd
U.S. Championships	5th	2nd	1st
JGP Belarus	5th		
JGP Italy	6th		
JGP Lithuania		2nd	
JGP Poland			1st
JGP Slovenia		1st	
JGP United States			1st
Bavarian Open			1st

== Detailed results ==
=== Ice dance with Emilea Zingas ===
ISU personal best scores in the +5/-5 GOE System
Segment	Type	Score	Event
Total	TSS	209.20	2026 World Championships
Rhythm dance	TSS	84.21	2026 World Championships
Rhythm dance	TES	48.30	2026 World Championships
Rhythm dance	PCS	35.91	2026 World Championships
Free dance	TSS	124.99	2026 World Championships
Free dance	TES	69.85	2026 World Championships
Free dance	PCS	55.14	2026 World Championships

Results in the 2022–23 season
Date	Event	RD		FD		Total	
Date	Event	P	Score	P	Score	P	Score
Dec 7–10, 2022	(Croatia) 2022 CS Golden Spin of Zagreb	3	73.14	3	110.96	3	184.10
Jan 23–29, 2023	(United States) 2023 U.S. Championships	3	78.18	4	119.95	4	198.13

Results in the 2023–24 season
Date	Event	RD		FD		Total	
Date	Event	P	Score	P	Score	P	Score
Sep 28–30, 2023	(Slovakia) 2023 CS Nepela Memorial	3	75.61	3	111.67	4	187.28
Oct 27–29, 2023	2023 Skate Canada International	5	72.25	5	112.71	5	184.96
Nov 17–19, 2023	(Finland) 2023 Grand Prix of Espoo	5	72.13	5	111.65	5	183.78
Dec 6–9, 2023	(Croatia) 2023 CS Golden Spin of Zagreb	2	78.23	3	105.09	3	183.32
Jan 22–28, 2024	(United States) 2024 U.S. Championships	5	77.59	8	104.11	6	181.70
Jan 30 – Feb 4, 2024	(China) 2024 Four Continents Championships	4	75.76	4	117.31	4	193.07

Results in the 2024–25 season
Date	Event	RD		FD		Total	
Date	Event	P	Score	P	Score	P	Score
Sep 18–21, 2024	(Germany) 2024 CS Nebelhorn Trophy	3	77.47	3	116.87	3	194.34
Oct 25–27, 2024	2024 Skate Canada International	4	75.63	5	113.78	5	189.41
Nov 15–17, 2024	(Finland) 2024 Finlandia Trophy	6	72.72	3	116.76	5	189.48
Nov 20–24, 2024	(Poland) 2024 CS Warsaw Cup	2	77.20	2	118.87	2	196.07
Jan 20–26, 2025	(United States) 2025 U.S. Championships	3	82.13	4	122.04	4	204.17
Feb 19–23, 2025	(South Korea) 2025 Four Continents Championships	5	74.63	5	113.92	5	188.55

Results in the 2025–26 season
Date	Event	RD		FD		Total	
Date	Event	P	Score	P	Score	P	Score
Sep 5–7, 2025	(Japan) 2025 CS Kinoshita Group Cup	2	76.24	2	117.27	2	193.51
Oct 24–26, 2025	2025 Cup of China	2	80.43	2	121.84	2	202.27
Nov 21–23, 2025	(Finland) 2025 Finlandia Trophy	3	78.51	3	117.51	3	196.02
Dec 4–7, 2025	(Japan) 2025–26 Grand Prix Final	6	75.78	6	117.83	6	193.61
Jan 4–11, 2026	(United States) 2026 U.S. Championships	2	85.98	2	127.67	2	213.65
Jan 21–25, 2026	(China) 2026 Four Continents Championships	1	79.97	1	122.89	1	202.86
Feb 6–19, 2026	(Italy) 2026 Winter Olympics	6	83.53	5	123.19	5	206.72
Mar 24–29, 2026	(Czech Republic) 2026 World Championships	4	84.21	4	124.99	3	209.20

Results in the 2026–27 season
Date	Event	RD		FD		Total	
Date	Event	P	Score	P	Score	P	Score
Nov 13–15, 2026	(United States) 2026 Skate America	1	82.52	1	119.36	1	201.88

=== Ice dance with Avonley Nguyen ===
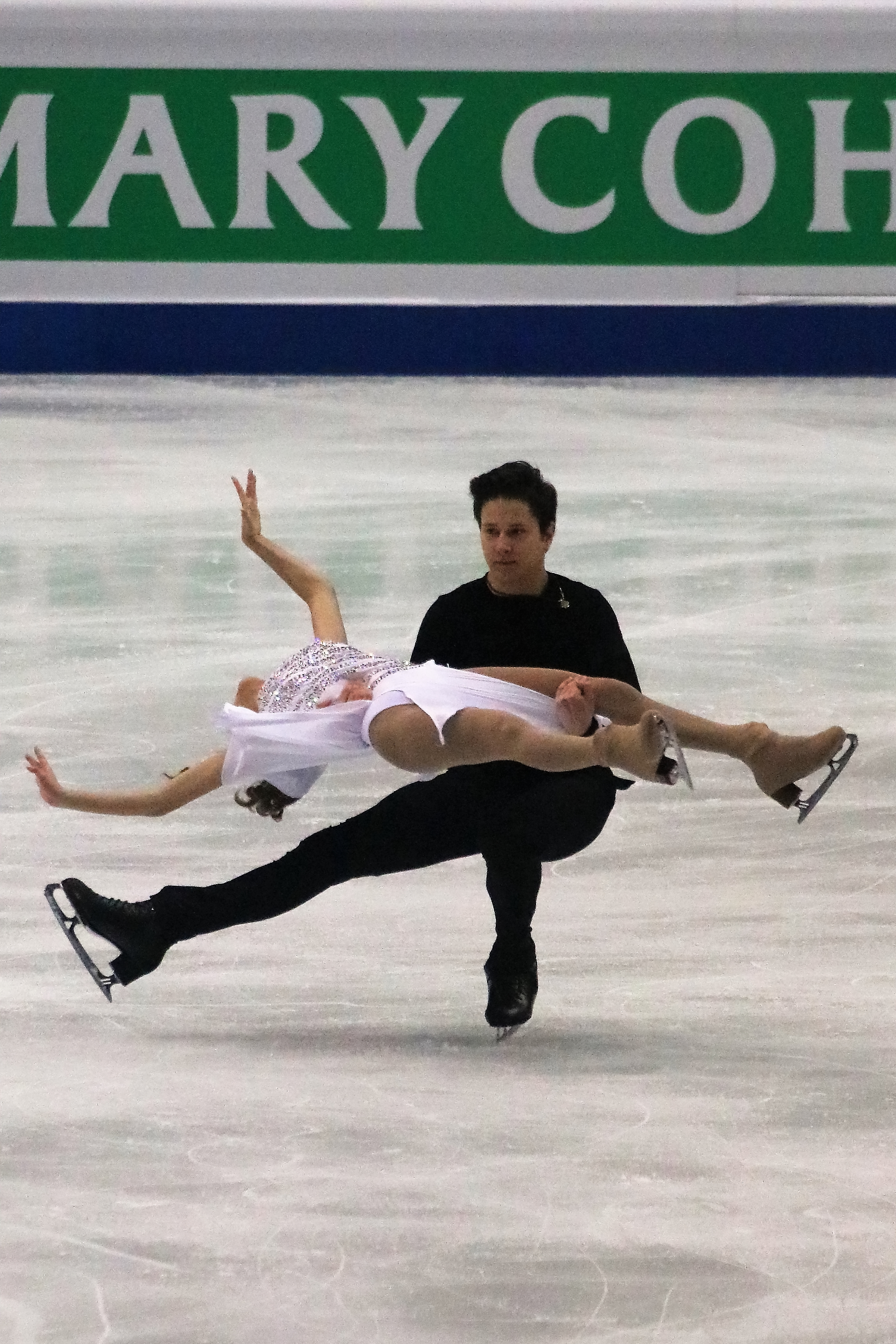
Nguyen and Kolesnik at the 2019–20 Junior Grand Prix Final

Results in the 2017–18 season
Date	Event	SD		FD		Total	
Date	Event	P	Score	P	Score	P	Score
Sep 20–23, 2017	(Belgium) 2017 JGP Belarus	5	50.37	6	64.52	5	114.89
Oct 11–14, 2017	2017 JGP Italy	6	52.84	6	72.46	6	125.30
Dec 28, 2017 – Jan 7, 2018	(United States) 2018 U.S. Championships (Junior)	7	54.02	4	80.29	5	134.31

Results in the 2018–19 season
Date	Event	RD		FD		Total	
Date	Event	P	Score	P	Score	P	Score
Sep 5–9, 2018	2018 JGP Lithuania	2	63.40	2	98.44	2	161.84
Oct 3–6, 2018	2018 JGP Slovenia	1	65.41	1	100.22	1	165.63
Dec 7–12, 2018	(Canada) 2018–19 Junior Grand Prix Final	5	63.73	5	94.74	5	158.47
Jan 18–27, 2019	(United States) 2019 U.S. Championships (Junior)	2	65.92	1	105.14	2	171.06
Mar 4–10, 2019	(Croatia) 2019 World Junior Championships	5	65.18	3	102.72	4	167.90

Results in the 2019–20 season
Date	Event	RD		FD		Total	
Date	Event	P	Score	P	Score	P	Score
Aug 28–31, 2019	2019 JGP United States	1	66.17	1	104.63	1	170.80
Sep 18–21, 2019	2019 JGP Poland	1	69.20	1	105.48	1	174.68
Dec 5–8, 2019	(Italy) 2019–20 Junior Grand Prix Final	2	68.72	2	106.02	2	174.74
Jan 20–26, 2020	(United States) 2020 U.S. Championships (junior)	1	74.49	1	109.89	1	184.38
Feb 3–9, 2020	(Germany) 2020 Bavarian Open	1	64.13	1	101.33	1	165.46
Mar 2–8, 2020	(Estonia) 2020 World Junior Championships	3	68.27	1	108.91	1	177.18
