= 2019–20 Grand Prix of Figure Skating Final =

2019–20 Grand Prix Final
- Type: Grand Prix
- Date: December 5 – December 8, 2019
- Season: 2019–20
- Location: Turin, Italy
- Host: Italian Ice Sports Federation
- Venue: Torino Palavela

Champions
- Men's singles: (United States) Nathan Chen (S) (Japan) Shun Sato (J)
- Ladies' singles: (Russia) Alena Kostornaia (S) (Russia) Kamila Valieva (J)
- Pairs: (China) Sui Wenjing / Han Cong (S) (Russia) Apollinariia Panfilova / Dmitry Rylov (J)
- Ice dance: (France) Gabriella Papadakis / Guillaume Cizeron (S) (Georgia (country)) Maria Kazakova / Georgy Reviya (J)
- Previous: 2018–19 Grand Prix Final
- Next: 2020–21 Grand Prix Final
- Previous Grand Prix: 2019 NHK Trophy
- Next Grand Prix: 2020 Skate America

The 2019–20 Grand Prix of Figure Skating Final and ISU Junior Grand Prix Final was held from December 5–8, 2019 at the Torino Palavela in Turin, Italy. The combined event was the culmination of two international series — the Grand Prix of Figure Skating and the Junior Grand Prix. Medals were awarded in the disciplines of men's singles, ladies' singles, pair skating, and ice dance on the senior and junior levels.

Strasbourg, France was announced as the provisional host, before being changed to Turin.

== Qualifiers ==
=== Senior ===
| | Men | Ladies | Pairs | Ice dance |
|---|---|---|---|---|
| 1 | (Japan) Yuzuru Hanyu | (Russia) Alena Kostornaia | (China) Sui Wenjing / Han Cong | (France) Gabriella Papadakis / Guillaume Cizeron |
| 2 | (United States) Nathan Chen | (Russia) Alexandra Trusova | (Russia) Aleksandra Boikova / Dmitrii Kozlovskii | (Russia) Victoria Sinitsina / Nikita Katsalapov |
| 3 | (Russia) Alexander Samarin | (Russia) Anna Shcherbakova | (China) Peng Cheng / Jin Yang | (Canada) Piper Gilles / Paul Poirier |
| 4 | (Russia) Dmitri Aliev | (Japan) Rika Kihira | (Russia) Anastasia Mishina / Aleksandr Galliamov | (United States) Madison Hubbell / Zachary Donohue |
| 5 | (France) Kévin Aymoz | (Russia) Alina Zagitova | (Canada) Kirsten Moore-Towers / Michael Marinaro | (Russia) Alexandra Stepanova / Ivan Bukin |
| 6 | (China) Jin Boyang | (United States) Bradie Tennell | (Russia) Daria Pavliuchenko / Denis Khodykin | (United States) Madison Chock / Evan Bates |
Alternates
| 1st | (Canada) Nam Nguyen | (Japan) Satoko Miyahara | (Russia) Evgenia Tarasova / Vladimir Morozov | (Italy) Charlène Guignard / Marco Fabbri |
| 2nd | (United States) Jason Brown | (United States) Mariah Bell | (United States) Haven Denney / Brandon Frazier | (Canada) Laurence Fournier Beaudry / Nikolaj Sørensen |
| 3rd | (Japan) Keiji Tanaka | (Russia) Elizaveta Tuktamysheva | (Canada) Liubov Ilyushechkina / Charlie Bilodeau | (United Kingdom) Lilah Fear / Lewis Gibson |

=== Junior ===
| | Men | Ladies | Pairs | Ice dance |
|---|---|---|---|---|
| 1 | (Russia) Andrei Mozalev | (Russia) Kamila Valieva | (Russia) Apollinariia Panfilova / Dmitry Rylov | (United States) Avonley Nguyen / Vadym Kolesnik |
| 2 | (Japan) Yuma Kagiyama | (United States) Alysa Liu | (Russia) Iuliia Artemeva / Mikhail Nazarychev | (Russia) Elizaveta Shanaeva / Devid Naryzhnyy |
| 3 | (Russia) Petr Gumennik | (South Korea) Lee Hae-in | (Russia) Kseniia Akhanteva / Valerii Kolesov | (Russia) Elizaveta Khudaiberdieva / Andrey Filatov |
| 4 | (Italy) Daniel Grassl | (Russia) Ksenia Sinitsyna | (Russia) Diana Mukhametzianova / Ilya Mironov | (Georgia (country)) Maria Kazakova / Georgy Reviya |
| 5 | (Russia) Daniil Samsonov | (Russia) Daria Usacheva | (Germany) Annika Hocke / Robert Kunkel | (France) Loïcia Demougeot / Théo Le Mercier |
| 6 | (Japan) Shun Sato | (Russia) Viktoria Vasilieva | (Russia) Alina Pepeleva / Roman Pleshkov | (Russia) Diana Davis / Gleb Smolkin |
Alternates
| 1st | (Russia) Artur Danielian | (Russia) Anna Frolova | (United States) Kate Finster / Balazs Nagy | (Russia) Sofya Tyutyunina / Alexander Shustitskiy |
| 2nd | (Canada) Stephen Gogolev | (South Korea) Wi Seo-yeong | (Russia) Anna Shcheglova / Ilia Kalashnikov | (Canada) Natalie D'Alessandro / Bruce Waddell |
| 3rd | (Russia) Ilya Yablokov | (Russia) Anastasia Tarakanova | (China) Wang Huidi / Jia Ziqi | (Russia) Ekaterina Katashinskaia / Aleksandr Vaskovich |

== Medals summary ==
=== Medalists ===
==== Senior ====
| Discipline | Gold | Silver | Bronze |
|---|---|---|---|
| Men | (United States) Nathan Chen | (Japan) Yuzuru Hanyu | (France) Kévin Aymoz |
| Ladies | (Russia) Alena Kostornaia | (Russia) Anna Shcherbakova | (Russia) Alexandra Trusova |
| Pairs | (China) Sui Wenjing / Han Cong | (China) Peng Cheng / Jin Yang | (Russia) Anastasia Mishina / Aleksandr Galliamov |
| Ice dance | (France) Gabriella Papadakis / Guillaume Cizeron | (United States) Madison Chock / Evan Bates | (United States) Madison Hubbell / Zachary Donohue |

==== Junior ====
| Discipline | Gold | Silver | Bronze |
|---|---|---|---|
| Men | (Japan) Shun Sato | (Russia) Andrei Mozalev | (Russia) Daniil Samsonov |
| Ladies | (Russia) Kamila Valieva | (United States) Alysa Liu | (Russia) Daria Usacheva |
| Pairs | (Russia) Apollinariia Panfilova / Dmitry Rylov | (Russia) Diana Mukhametzianova / Ilya Mironov | (Russia) Kseniia Akhanteva / Valerii Kolesov |
| Ice dance | (Georgia (country)) Maria Kazakova / Georgy Reviya | (United States) Avonley Nguyen / Vadym Kolesnik | (Russia) Elizaveta Shanaeva / Devid Naryzhnyy |

=== Medals table ===
==== Senior ====
| Rank | Nation | Gold | Silver | Bronze | Total |
|---|---|---|---|---|---|
| 1 | Russia | 1 | 1 | 2 | 4 |
| 2 | United States | 1 | 1 | 1 | 3 |
| 3 | China | 1 | 1 | 0 | 2 |
| 4 | France | 1 | 0 | 1 | 2 |
| 5 | Japan | 0 | 1 | 0 | 1 |
| Totals (5 entries) | | 4 | 4 | 4 | 12 |

==== Junior ====
| Rank | Nation | Gold | Silver | Bronze | Total |
|---|---|---|---|---|---|
| 1 | Russia | 2 | 2 | 4 | 8 |
| 2 | Georgia | 1 | 0 | 0 | 1 |
| 2 | Japan | 1 | 0 | 0 | 1 |
| 4 | United States | 0 | 2 | 0 | 2 |
| Totals (4 entries) | | 4 | 4 | 4 | 12 |

== Records ==
The following new ISU best scores were set during this competition:

| Event | Component | Skater(s) | Score | Date | Ref |
|---|---|---|---|---|---|
| Ladies | Short program | (Russia) Alena Kostornaia | 85.45 | December 6, 2019 | |
| Men | Free skating | (United States) Nathan Chen | 224.92 | December 7, 2019 | |
| Men | Total score | (United States) Nathan Chen | 335.30 | December 7, 2019 | |
| Junior men | Free skating | (Japan) Shun Sato | 177.86 | December 7, 2019 | |
| Junior men | Total score | (Japan) Shun Sato | 255.11 | December 7, 2019 | |
| Junior ice dance | Free dance | (Georgia (country)) Maria Kazakova / Georgy Reviya | 106.14 | December 7, 2019 | |
| Ladies | Total score | (Russia) Alena Kostornaia | 247.59 | December 7, 2019 | |

== Senior-level results ==
=== Men ===
| Rank | Name | Nation | Total points | SP | | FS | |
|---|---|---|---|---|---|---|---|
| 1 | Nathan Chen | United States | 335.30 WR | 1 | 110.38 | 1 | 224.92 WR |
| 2 | Yuzuru Hanyu | Japan | 291.43 | 2 | 97.43 | 2 | 194.00 |
| 3 | Kévin Aymoz | France | 275.63 | 3 | 96.71 | 3 | 178.92 |
| 4 | Alexander Samarin | Russia | 248.83 | 5 | 81.32 | 4 | 167.51 |
| 5 | Jin Boyang | China | 241.44 | 6 | 80.67 | 5 | 160.77 |
| 6 | Dmitri Aliev | Russia | 220.04 | 4 | 88.78 | 6 | 131.26 |

=== Ladies ===
| Rank | Name | Nation | Total points | SP | | FS | |
|---|---|---|---|---|---|---|---|
| 1 | Alena Kostornaia | Russia | 247.59 WR | 1 | 85.45 WR | 2 | 162.14 |
| 2 | Anna Shcherbakova | Russia | 240.92 | 3 | 78.27 | 1 | 162.65 |
| 3 | Alexandra Trusova | Russia | 233.18 | 5 | 71.45 | 3 | 161.73 |
| 4 | Rika Kihira | Japan | 216.47 | 6 | 70.71 | 4 | 145.76 |
| 5 | Bradie Tennell | United States | 212.18 | 4 | 72.20 | 5 | 139.98 |
| 6 | Alina Zagitova | Russia | 205.23 | 2 | 79.60 | 6 | 125.63 |

=== Pairs ===
| Rank | Name | Nation | Total points | SP | | FS | |
|---|---|---|---|---|---|---|---|
| 1 | Sui Wenjing / Han Cong | China | 211.69 | 1 | 77.50 | 2 | 134.19 |
| 2 | Peng Cheng / Jin Yang | China | 204.27 | 5 | 69.67 | 1 | 134.60 |
| 3 | Anastasia Mishina / Aleksandr Galliamov | Russia | 203.13 | 4 | 71.48 | 3 | 131.65 |
| 4 | Aleksandra Boikova / Dmitrii Kozlovskii | Russia | 201.84 | 2 | 76.65 | 5 | 125.19 |
| 5 | Kirsten Moore-Towers / Michael Marinaro | Canada | 197.99 | 6 | 67.08 | 4 | 130.91 |
| 6 | Daria Pavliuchenko / Denis Khodykin | Russia | 194.75 | 3 | 75.16 | 6 | 119.59 |

=== Ice dance ===
| Rank | Name | Nation | Total points | RD | | FD | |
|---|---|---|---|---|---|---|---|
| 1 | Gabriella Papadakis / Guillaume Cizeron | France | 219.85 | 1 | 83.83 | 1 | 136.02 |
| 2 | Madison Chock / Evan Bates | United States | 210.68 | 3 | 81.67 | 2 | 129.01 |
| 3 | Madison Hubbell / Zachary Donohue | United States | 207.93 | 2 | 82.72 | 3 | 125.21 |
| 4 | Alexandra Stepanova / Ivan Bukin | Russia | 204.88 | 5 | 81.14 | 5 | 123.74 |
| 5 | Piper Gilles / Paul Poirier | Canada | 203.50 | 6 | 79.75 | 4 | 123.97 |
| 6 | Victoria Sinitsina / Nikita Katsalapov | Russia | 203.39 | 4 | 81.51 | 6 | 121.88 |

== Junior-level results ==
=== Men ===
| Rank | Name | Nation | Total points | SP | | FS | |
|---|---|---|---|---|---|---|---|
| 1 | Shun Sato | Japan | 255.11 | 3 | 77.25 | 1 | 177.86 |
| 2 | Andrei Mozalev | Russia | 241.48 | 1 | 82.45 | 2 | 159.03 |
| 3 | Daniil Samsonov | Russia | 230.19 | 2 | 77.75 | 4 | 152.44 |
| 4 | Yuma Kagiyama | Japan | 227.09 | 6 | 71.19 | 3 | 155.90 |
| 5 | Petr Gumennik | Russia | 212.62 | 4 | 72.16 | 5 | 140.46 |
| 6 | Daniel Grassl | Italy | 195.66 | 5 | 71.95 | 6 | 123.71 |

=== Ladies ===
| Rank | Name | Nation | Total points | SP | | FS | |
|---|---|---|---|---|---|---|---|
| 1 | Kamila Valieva | Russia | 207.47 | 4 | 69.02 | 1 | 138.45 |
| 2 | Alysa Liu | United States | 204.65 | 1 | 71.19 | 2 | 133.46 |
| 3 | Daria Usacheva | Russia | 200.37 | 2 | 70.15 | 3 | 130.22 |
| 4 | Ksenia Sinitsyna | Russia | 195.57 | 3 | 69.40 | 5 | 126.17 |
| 5 | Lee Hae-in | South Korea | 194.38 | 6 | 65.39 | 4 | 128.99 |
| 6 | Viktoria Vasilieva | Russia | 184.37 | 5 | 68.07 | 6 | 116.30 |

=== Pairs ===
| Rank | Name | Nation | Total points | SP | | FS | |
|---|---|---|---|---|---|---|---|
| 1 | Apollinariia Panfilova / Dmitry Rylov | Russia | 185.23 | 1 | 68.80 | 2 | 116.43 |
| 2 | Diana Mukhametzianova / Ilya Mironov | Russia | 184.37 | 3 | 64.90 | 1 | 119.47 |
| 3 | Kseniia Akhanteva / Valerii Kolesov | Russia | 179.68 | 2 | 66.64 | 4 | 113.04 |
| 4 | Iuliia Artemeva / Mikhail Nazarychev | Russia | 178.56 | 5 | 63.89 | 3 | 114.67 |
| 5 | Alina Pepeleva / Roman Pleshkov | Russia | 172.53 | 4 | 64.67 | 5 | 107.86 |
| 6 | Annika Hocke / Robert Kunkel | Germany | 159.22 | 6 | 59.47 | 6 | 99.75 |

=== Ice dance ===
| Rank | Name | Nation | Total points | RD | | FD | |
|---|---|---|---|---|---|---|---|
| 1 | Maria Kazakova / Georgy Reviya | Georgia | 174.90 | 1 | 68.76 | 1 | 106.14 |
| 2 | Avonley Nguyen / Vadym Kolesnik | United States | 174.74 | 2 | 68.72 | 2 | 106.02 |
| 3 | Elizaveta Shanaeva / Devid Naryzhnyy | Russia | 164.22 | 3 | 66.21 | 3 | 98.01 |
| 4 | Elizaveta Khudaiberdieva / Andrey Filatov | Russia | 163.03 | 4 | 65.07 | 4 | 97.96 |
| 5 | Loïcia Demougeot / Théo Le Mercier | France | 156.26 | 5 | 62.84 | 5 | 93.42 |
| 6 | Diana Davis / Gleb Smolkin | Russia | 152.21 | 6 | 59.89 | 6 | 92.32 |

== Senior recap ==
=== Men ===
Yuzuru Hanyu finished the first half of the season with the highest scores in all three categories - short program, free skate and total score; thus was seen as the favorite to win his first Grand Prix title since 2017, with Nathan Chen tipped to be the skater most likely to beat him. It was the first time since the 2014 Junior Grand Prix Final that two-time silver medallist Shoma Uno did not qualify for the final, while Kévin Aymoz became the first French man to qualify since Brian Joubert.

==== Short program ====
Chen skated a clean short program receiving scores that let him lead Hanyu by over 12 points and 1.44 shy of Hanyu's current world record from the 2020 Four Continents Figure Skating Championships. Hanyu made an error, as he was unable to add a combo jump to his program, notably sitting in the kiss and cry alone after one his coaches, Ghislain Briand experienced difficulties travelling from Toronto to Turin, with Ghislain's passport stolen while transiting through Frankfurt Airport. Aymoz finished in third after the rink organisers accidentally began playing the wrong short program music, however he was able to keep his composure and earned a personal best short program score. Aliev's short program placed him in fourth place, after a near-fall when his blades clipped the ice during his step sequence. Samarin made a variety of jumping errors during his performance and finished fifth, while Jin fell on his opening quadruple lutz which cost him ten points in his technical score.

==== Free skate ====
Anticipation was high for the free skate after Hanyu was filmed attempting quadruple axels during the public practice session, although he would not perform the jump during the free skate. While both Chen and Hanyu landed five quadruple jumps each, Hanyu singled a triple axel attempt which was enough to give Chen, who already had a huge lead from the short program, the victory. Hanyu was also able to land the quadruple lutz, the first since his ankle injury before the 2018 Winter Olympics and was visibly exhausted at the end of the performance. Aymoz skated a sublimely performed free skate, the best of his career, to win his first major competition medal and the first for France since Brian Joubert in 2007.

=== Ladies ===
It was highly predicted that Russia would complete a historic podium sweep, the first in the history of the ladies event as Alena Kostornaia, Anna Shcherbakova and Alexandra Trusova swept the Grand Prix events, the first time one country has swept every event in the ladies division. Trusova, who was ranked number one in the world, was the favorite to win the title from her fellow training partners. Bradie Tennell became the first American skater to qualify for the final since Ashley Wagner in 2015, as well as the first non-Russian and non-Japanese skater to qualify since Kaetlyn Osmond in 2017. Defending Gold and Silver medalists, Rika Kihira and Alina Zagitova also requalified for the final, while last year's bronze medallist Elizaveta Tuktamysheva missed the final on a tie-breaker to Tennell after both achieved the same number of points at the end of the season.

==== Short program ====
Kostornaia once again set the short program world record with a six-point lead over training partners Zagitova and Shcherbakova. Kostornaia believed that her score was not going to break the world record and was pleasantly surprised when she accomplished it. Shcherbakova impressed the audience and the judges, with a clean executed program and an improvement in performance component scores. Tennell finished in fourth with a clean performance, with her triple toeloop at the end of her combination jump called under-rotated. Trusova and Kihira were fifth and sixth respectively after both making mistakes on their triple axel attempts, with Kihira also falling at the end of her triple flip-triple toeloop combination.

==== Free skate ====
Despite featuring no quadruple jumps in the free skate like her training partners, Kostornaia's score in the short program was enough to maintain her lead and claim victory, with her performance being highly praised by critics and fans. Her performance in the free skate also made Kostornaia the new world record holder for the highest combined total in ladies' singles, with a score of 247.59. Shcherbakova won the free skate with a personal best, with her technical content gaining the edge over Kostornaia, with the judges placing her second overall. Trusova became the first female skater to execute a quadruple flip, as well as achieving the highest technical score of the session, although could not execute the performance standard that Shcherbakova - who achieved a technical score four points lower - had achieved, therefore, she placed third overall and third in the free skate by the judging panel. Defending champion Kihira made her first quadruple jump attempt of her international career, falling on a quadruple salchow in spite of having it previously in practice. Nonetheless, she executed two triple axels, including one in combination. Zagitova, skating the last program of the day, stunned the audience with a fall on her double axel, a two-footed landing on her triple loop and suffered multiple under-rotations and downgrades that saw her slide from second to last place, being close to tears in the kiss-and-cry as the scores were revealed.

=== Pairs ===
Sui Wenjing and Han Cong were the favourites to clinch their first Senior Grand Prix title and China's first Grand Prix final win in 10 years, after winning their sole Junior Grand Prix title in 2011. Aleksandra Boikova & Dmitrii Kozlovskii had recorded the best free program of the season and as the only other team to win both of their Grand Prix events, were expected to challenge for the title. High-profile pairs teams such as defending bronze medalists Evgenia Tarasova & Vladimir Morozov and last years qualifiers Nicole Della Monica & Matteo Guarise missed qualifying for the final. The only team to return after medalling last season was silver medalists Peng Cheng & Jin Yang.

==== Short program ====
Each team made little mistakes, with Sui & Han taking the lead in the short after a mistake on their throw, resulting in Sui's hand touching the ice. The three Russian pairs finished second, third and fourth; with Boikova & Kozlovskii less than a point behind and Pavliuchenko and Khodykin completing the top three. Peng & Jin finished in fifth after both skaters made mistakes on their triple toeloops and Peng skate touching the ice after their throw. Moore-Towers & Marinaro finished last in the short program after an error-ridden program, including a fall from Moore-Tower's on the throw and Marinaro stepping out of his triple toeloop.

==== Free skate ====
Sui & Han's lead from the short program was enough to win their first ever Senior Grand Prix title after four attempts, with teammates Peng & Jin completing a 1-2 sweep for China. Han uncharacteristically made mistakes in his jumps, with Sui explaining to the press that having their three Grand Prix within the past month had taken a toll on their bodies, "this time, we've had many problems, this is our third competition in a very short time for us it was really hard." Peng & Jin, who won the free skate after finishing fifth in the short program were pleased with their performance, with the only mistake being both skaters doubling their triple salchow attempts. The Russian pairs had extreme difficulties with their skates, with Boikova & Kozlovskii unable to cope with the pressure of the situation with mistakes on both of their throws, while Pavliuchenko & Khodykin experienced a near-similar performance to their free skate performance from last years final, with Pavliuchenko falling twice during the program.

=== Ice dance ===
Gabriella Papadakis & Guillaume Cizeron were hotly tipped to win their second Grand Prix final title, after finishing the season with personal best scores over 10 points ahead of the next best team Victoria Sinitsina & Nikita Katsalapov in overall total scores and 8 points ahead of the free dance from training mates Madison Chock & Evan Bates. Defending champions Madison Hubbell & Zachary Donohue also requalified for the final, while defending bronze medallists Charlène Guignard & Marco Fabbri missed out on qualifying on home turf. Canadian's Piper Gilles & Paul Poirier made their first appearance at the Grand Prix Final since 2014, after no Canadian team qualified the previous year. Alexandra Stepanova & Ivan Bukin were the only other team from last year to requalify for the final.

==== Rhythm dance ====
The rhythm dance was a close competition overall, with Papadakis & Cizeron suffering their first fall in competition for more than four years, with Papadakis' blade getting caught under the ice during a step sequence. Chock & Bates were the only team to accomplish a seasons best on the rhythm dance, finishing in third place behind compatriots Hubbell and Donohue. All teams struggled to achieve a level four difficulty status, with messy footwork a frequent feature throughout the segment.

==== Free dance ====
Although they were not able to better their world record score, Papadakis and Cizeron were able to win their second Grand Prix final title, with Chock and Bates winning their first Grand Prix final medal (silver) in four years. Hubbell and Donohue's bronze medal meant that the coaching team of Marie-France Dubreuil, Patrice Lauzon and Romain Haguenauer had swept the podium for the first time. It is also the first time two American teams made the podium at the event. Papadakis joked at the end of the press conference that "I'm happy to eat. That's what I've been thinking all week because I'm in Italy and the food is so good and I've been thinking." Stepanova & Bukin rose to fourth place and Gilles & Poirier finished in fifth, although neither team received a seasons best on their free skates, both were pleased with their performances. Sinitsina & Katsalapov dropped from fourth to last after the free skate, much to the surprise of the audience and fans, with the judges finding technical faults upon reviewing the performance.

== Junior recap ==
=== Men ===
==== Short program ====
Andrei Mozalev, Daniil Samsonov, and Shun Sato each sat in medal contention after the short program, although a fall on a triple axel from Daniil and a downgraded step sequence and downgraded spins from Shun led to a five-point gap between them and the leader, Andrei.

==== Free skate ====
With Yuzuru Hanyu's loss in the Senior men's earlier in the day, Sato was able to put a smile on the face of the thousands of Japanese fans in attendance, winning the Grand Prix final in a Junior world record-breaking free skate, easily surpassing the five point deficit from Mozalev in the process.

Costly falls by Mozalev and Samsonov, combined with a season-best and world record-breaking free skate from Sato, dropped Mozalev to second place and Samsonov to third. Sato's compatriot Kagiyama finished fourth.

Samsonov's bronze medal marked one of six medals earned in the Final by a member of Eteri Tutberidze's Sambo70 team - the others coming from the ladies events with Alena Kostornaia, Anna Shcherbakova, Alexandra Trusova, Kamila Valieva, and Daria Usacheva.

Kagiyama produced a clean free skate, five points off his seasons best, after the surprise disappointment of his short program. Grassl, who had to replace his boots after breaking them in the short program, had difficulty landing his jumps with the home crowd doing their best to cheer him on.

=== Ladies ===
Initially, the Junior Ladies event seemed to promise to be a showdown between Russian competitor Kamila Valieva and American entrant Alysa Liu, each of whom performed quadruple jumps to win their qualifying events. However, with news that Valieva had only just recently returned to practice after being hampered by a leg injury three weeks before the competition, the podium appeared less certain.

Liu is the first American to qualify to the Junior Grand Prix Final since Ashley Wagner and Gracie Gold in the 2014-15 season. Meanwhile, Valieva and her training-mate Daria Usacheva represent the training camp of Eteri Tutberidze, whose skaters have captured the title in this event for the past five seasons.

==== Short program ====
Four of the six ladies performed their short program cleanly, with the only technical errors being a stepout from Kamila Valieva on her triple loop and an underrotation from Korean skater Lee Hae-in on the second jump in her jump combination. Alysa Liu cleanly executed a triple axel-triple toeloop combination to put herself in the lead over Russian skaters Daria Usacheva and Kseniia Sinitsyna. Due to her mistake, Valieva trailed behind the top three in fourth place. Liu and Viktoria Vasilieva set new personal bests in the short program.

==== Free skate ====
In the free skate, Alysa Liu attempted two triple axels (one in combination) and two quadruple lutzes (one in combination) in an effort to secure the title. However, after a costly fall and a number of underrotation calls, her score was only enough to put her in second place behind Kamila Valieva, who came back from a disappointing short program to skate her free program cleanly, albeit without quads. Despite a messy program plagued by a number of shaky jump landings, Daria Usacheva held on to secure the bronze medal behind Valieva and Liu. Ksenia Sinitsyna, initially in third place, dropped to fourth just ahead of Lee Hae-in, who skated a clean program to move from sixth to fifth. Viktoria Vasilieva dropped to sixth place after a fall in her free program.

Valieva's win marks the sixth time in a row that a skater coached by Eteri Tutberidze has won gold in the Junior Ladies event at the Junior Grand Prix Final, and the seventh time overall.

=== Pairs ===
Defending bronze medalists Apollinariia Panfilova / Dmitry Rylov entered the event as heavy favorites after winning both of their qualifying events handily and scoring new junior world records in the short program and overall over the course of the 2019–20 Junior Grand Prix season. However, a quartet of fellow Russian competitors, including returning contenders Kseniia Akhanteva / Valerii Kolesov would prove to provide stiff competition in the hunt for the podium.

Annika Hocke & Robert Kunkel, the only entrants not from Russia, are the first German team to qualify to the Junior Grand Prix Final and the first German athletes to qualify for a Grand Prix Final since Olympic champions Aljona Savchenko & Bruno Massot won the Senior pairs event in 2017.

=== Ice dance ===
American team Avonley Nguyen & Vadym Kolesnik entered the Junior Grand Prix Final as the top qualifiers and clear favorites after missing the podium at last year's Final. A strong Russian contingent, including defending bronze medalist Elizaveta Khudaiberdieva with her new partner Andrey Filatov, a returning team from Georgia, Maria Kazakova & Georgy Reviya, and French competitors Loïcia Demougeot & Théo Le Mercier in their first Junior Grand Prix Final rounded out the field.

==== Rhythm dance ====
In an unexpected twist, Kazakova & Reviya set a new personal best to lead Nguyen & Kolesnik by a mere 0.04 points after the rhythm dance. Russian team Elizaveta Shanaeva & Devid Naryzhnyy completed the top three after the first segment, finishing over two points behind the two leading teams and leaving Khudaiberdieva & Filatov in fourth, just over a point shy of the podium, and Demougeot & Le Mercier and fellow Russian team Diana Davis & Gleb Smolkin trailing further behind.

==== Free dance ====
The free dance imitated the results of the rhythm dance in nearly identical fashion, with Kazakova & Reviya maintaining their narrow lead over Nguyen & Kolesnik by another very narrow margin: just 0.12 points, with the judges rewarding Kazakova & Reviya for their clever pairs-inspired choreography and effortless execution on both lift elements, as they became the first athletes representing Georgia to win a Grand Prix Final title in both the Junior and Senior events. Nguyen & Kolesnik's silver medal made it the first time since 2008 that neither of the top two teams represented Russia. All other teams, including eventual bronze medallists Shanaeva & Naryzhnyy, held their positions from the rhythm dance, with Shanaeva appearing to fall after a step sequence which luckily did not impact their final placing.
