= 2019–20 ISU Junior Grand Prix =

- Type: ISU Junior Grand Prix
- Date: August 21 – December 8, 2019
- Season: 2019–20
- Previous: 2018–19 ISU Junior Grand Prix
- Next: 2020–21 ISU Junior Grand Prix

The 2019–20 ISU Junior Grand Prix was a series of junior international competitions organized by the International Skating Union that were held from August 2019 through December 2019. It was the junior-level complement to the 2019–20 ISU Grand Prix of Figure Skating. Medals were awarded in men's singles, women's singles, pair skating, and ice dance. Skaters earned points based on their placement at each event and the top six in each discipline qualified to compete at the 2019–20 Junior Grand Prix Final in Turin, Italy.

== Competitions ==
The locations of the JGP events change yearly. This season, the series was composed of the following events.

Date	Event	Location	Notes	Results
August 21–24	2019 JGP France	Courchevel, France	No pairs	Details
August 28–31	2019 JGP United States	Lake Placid, New York, United States		Details
September 4–7	2019 JGP Latvia	Riga, Latvia	No pairs	Details
September 11–14	2019 JGP Russia	Chelyabinsk, Russia		Details
September 18–21	2019 JGP Poland	Gdańsk, Poland		Details
September 25–28	2019 JGP Croatia	Zagreb, Croatia		Details
October 2–5	2019 JGP Italy	Egna, Italy	No pairs	Details
December 5–8	(Italy) 2019–20 JGP Final	Turin, Italy		Details

== Entries ==
Skaters who reached the age of 13 before July 1, 2019, but had not turned 19 (singles skaters and female pairs or ice dance skaters) or 21 (male pairs or ice dance skaters) were eligible to compete on the junior circuit. Competitors were chosen by their countries according to their federations' selection procedures. The number of entries allotted to each ISU member federation was determined by their skaters' placements at the 2019 World Junior Championships in each discipline.

=== Number of entries per discipline ===
Based on the results of the 2019 World Junior Championships, each ISU member nation was allowed to field the following number of entries per event.

Singles and ice dance
Entries	Men	Ladies	Ice dance
Two entries in seven events	United States; Russia; Italy	Russia; United States; Japan	Canada; Russia; United States
One entry in seven events	Canada; France; Georgia	South Korea; Canada; Georgia	Georgia; France; Ukraine
One entry in six events	Japan; Azerbaijan; Czech Republic; Ukraine	Azerbaijan; Hungary; France; Italy	Italy; Czech Republic; Belarus; Estonia
One entry in five events	Israel; Austria; Turkey; South Korea; Sweden; Germany	Ukraine; Austria; China; United Kingdom; Hong Kong; Bulgaria; Switzerland; Israel	Germany; United Kingdom; Lithuania; Armenia
One entry in four events	China; Estonia; Thailand; Belarus	Croatia; Estonia; Chinese Taipei; Germany; Finland; Sweden	Spain; Hungary; China; Israel
One entry in three events	Switzerland; Kazakhstan; Croatia; Spain; Bulgaria; United Kingdom; Poland	Kazakhstan; New Zealand; Czech Republic; Slovakia; Belarus; Netherlands; Romania; Spain; Poland; Lithuania; Latvia; Mexico; Slovenia; Denmark; Turkey	Japan; Chinese Taipei; Poland; Australia; Greece; Austria

- If not listed above, one entry in two events is allowed.
- Host federations may enter up to three spots per discipline.

Pairs
Entries	Pairs
Three entries in four events	Russia; China; United States; Israel
Two entries in four events	Ukraine; France; Canada; Germany; Italy; Japan; Slovakia

- If not listed above, one entry in three events is allowed.
- Host federations have an unlimited number of entries.

== Medalists ==
=== Men's singles ===
Competition	Gold	Silver	Bronze	Results
JGP France	(Japan) Yuma Kagiyama	(Canada) Aleksa Rakic	(Russia) Andrei Kutovoi	Details
JGP United States	(Japan) Shun Sato	(Canada) Stephen Gogolev	(Russia) Gleb Lutfullin	Details
JGP Latvia	(Russia) Andrei Mozalev	(South Korea) Lee Si-hyeong	(Russia) Daniil Samsonov	Details
JGP Russia	(Russia) Petr Gumennik	(Russia) Artur Danielian	(Russia) Ilya Yablokov	Details
JGP Poland	(Russia) Daniil Samsonov	(Japan) Yuma Kagiyama	(Italy) Daniel Grassl	Details
JGP Croatia	(Russia) Andrei Mozalev	(Russia) Artur Danielian	(Japan) Shun Sato	Details
JGP Italy	(Italy) Daniel Grassl	(Russia) Petr Gumennik	(Ukraine) Ivan Shmuratko	Details
(Italy) JGP Final	(Japan) Shun Sato	(Russia) Andrei Mozalev	(Russia) Daniil Samsonov	Details

=== Ladies' singles ===
Competition	Gold	Silver	Bronze	Results
JGP France	(Russia) Kamila Valieva	(South Korea) Wi Seo-yeong	(Russia) Maiia Khromykh	Details
JGP United States	(United States) Alysa Liu	(South Korea) Park Yeon-jeong	(Russia) Anastasia Tarakanova	Details
JGP Latvia	(South Korea) Lee Hae-in	(Russia) Daria Usacheva	(Japan) Rino Matsuike	Details
JGP Russia	(Russia) Kamila Valieva	(Russia) Ksenia Sinitsyna	(Russia) Viktoria Vasilieva	Details
JGP Poland	(United States) Alysa Liu	(Russia) Viktoria Vasilieva	(Russia) Anastasia Tarakanova	Details
JGP Croatia	(South Korea) Lee Hae-in	(Russia) Daria Usacheva	(Russia) Anna Frolova	Details
JGP Italy	(Russia) Ksenia Sinitsyna	(Russia) Anna Frolova	(Italy) Alessia Tornaghi	Details
(Italy) JGP Final	(Russia) Kamila Valieva	(United States) Alysa Liu	(Russia) Daria Usacheva	Details

=== Pairs ===
Competition	Gold	Silver	Bronze	Results
JGP United States	(Russia) Apollinariia Panfilova / Dmitry Rylov	(Russia) Kseniia Akhanteva / Valerii Kolesov	(Russia) Alina Pepeleva / Roman Pleshkov	Details
JGP Russia	(Russia) Kseniia Akhanteva / Valerii Kolesov	(Russia) Iuliia Artemeva / Mikhail Nazarychev	(Russia) Diana Mukhametzianova / Ilya Mironov	Details
JGP Poland	(Russia) Apollinariia Panfilova / Dmitry Rylov	(United States) Kate Finster / Balazs Nagy	(Germany) Annika Hocke / Robert Kunkel	Details
JGP Croatia	(Russia) Iuliia Artemeva / Mikhail Nazarychev	(Russia) Diana Mukhametzianova / Ilya Mironov	(Germany) Annika Hocke / Robert Kunkel	Details
(Italy) JGP Final	(Russia) Apollinariia Panfilova / Dmitry Rylov	(Russia) Diana Mukhametzianova / Ilya Mironov	(Russia) Kseniia Akhanteva / Valerii Kolesov	Details

=== Ice dance ===
Competition	Gold	Silver	Bronze	Results
JGP France	(Russia) Elizaveta Shanaeva / Devid Naryzhnyy	(France) Loïcia Demougeot / Théo le Mercier	(Russia) Ekaterina Katashinskaia / Aleksandr Vaskovich	Details
JGP United States	(United States) Avonley Nguyen / Vadym Kolesnik	(Russia) Diana Davis / Gleb Smolkin	(Czech Republic) Natálie Taschlerová / Filip Taschler	Details
JGP Latvia	(Russia) Elizaveta Khudaiberdieva / Andrey Filatov	(Georgia (country)) Maria Kazakova / Georgy Reviya	(Russia) Sofya Tyutyunina / Alexander Shustitskiy	Details
JGP Russia	(Russia) Elizaveta Shanaeva / Devid Naryzhnyy	(Russia) Diana Davis / Gleb Smolkin	(Canada) Nadiia Bashynska / Peter Beaumont	Details
JGP Poland	(United States) Avonley Nguyen / Vadym Kolesnik	(France) Loïcia Demougeot / Théo le Mercier	(Russia) Ekaterina Katashinskaia / Aleksandr Vaskovich	Details
JGP Croatia	(Georgia (country)) Maria Kazakova / Georgy Reviya	(Russia) Sofya Tyutyunina / Alexander Shustitskiy	(Canada) Emmy Bronsard / Aissa Bouaraguia	Details
JGP Italy	(Russia) Elizaveta Khudaiberdieva / Andrey Filatov	(Canada) Natalie D'Alessandro / Bruce Waddell	(Russia) Angelina Lazareva / Maksim Prokofiev	Details
(Italy) JGP Final	(Georgia (country)) Maria Kazakova / Georgy Reviya	(United States) Avonley Nguyen / Vadym Kolesnik	(Russia) Elizaveta Shanaeva / Devid Naryzhnyy	Details

== Medal standings ==
Rank	Nation	Gold	Silver	Bronze	Total
1	Russia	17	16	19	52
2	United States	4	3	0	7
3	Japan	3	1	2	6
4	South Korea	2	3	0	5
5	Georgia	2	1	0	3
6	Italy	1	0	2	3
7	Canada	0	3	2	5
8	France	0	2	0	2
9	Germany	0	0	2	2
10	Czech Republic	0	0	1	1
10	Ukraine	0	0	1	1
Totals (11 entries)		29	29	29	87

== Qualification ==
At each event, skaters earned points toward qualification for the Junior Grand Prix Final. Following the seventh event, the top six highest-scoring skaters/teams advanced to the Final. The points earned per placement were as follows.

Placement	Singles	Pairs/Ice dance
1st	15	15
2nd	13	13
3rd	11	11
4th	9	9
5th	7	7
6th	5	5
7th	4	4
8th	3	3
9th	2	—N/a
10th	1	—N/a

There were originally seven tie-breakers in cases of a tie in overall points:

1. Highest placement at an event. If a skater placed 1st and 3rd, the tiebreaker is the 1st place, and that beats a skater who placed 2nd in both events.
2. Highest combined total scores in both events. If a skater earned 200 points at one event and 250 at a second, that skater would win in the second tie-break over a skater who earned 200 points at one event and 150 at another.
3. Participated in two events.
4. Highest combined scores in the free skating/free dance portion of both events.
5. Highest individual score in the free skating/free dance portion from one event.
6. Highest combined scores in the short program/short dance of both events.
7. Highest number of total participants at the events.

If a tie remained, it was considered unbreakable and the tied skaters all advanced to the Junior Grand Prix Final.

=== Qualification standings ===
Points	Men	Ladies	Pairs	Ice dance
30	(Russia) Andrei Mozalev	(Russia) Kamila Valieva (United States) Alysa Liu (South Korea) Lee Hae-in	(Russia) Apollinariia Panfilova / Dmitry Rylov	(United States) Avonley Nguyen / Vadym Kolesnik (Russia) Elizaveta Shanaeva / Devid Naryzhnyy (Russia) Elizaveta Khudaiberdieva / Andrey Filatov
28	(Japan) Yuma Kagiyama (Russia) Petr Gumennik	(Russia) Ksenia Sinitsyna	(Russia) Iuliia Artemeva / Mikhail Nazarychev (Russia) Kseniia Akhanteva / Valerii Kolesov	(Georgia (country)) Maria Kazakova / Georgy Reviya
26	(Italy) Daniel Grassl (Russia) Daniil Samsonov (Japan) Shun Sato (Russia) Artur Danielian	(Russia) Daria Usacheva	—N/a	(France) Loïcia Demougeot / Théo Le Mercier (Russia) Diana Davis / Gleb Smolkin
24	—N/a	(Russia) Viktoria Vasilieva (Russia) Anna Frolova	(Russia) Diana Mukhametzianova / Ilya Mironov	(Russia) Sofya Tyutyunina / Alexander Shustitskiy
22	—N/a	(South Korea) Wi Seo-yeong (Russia) Anastasia Tarakanova	(Germany) Annika Hocke / Robert Kunkel	(Canada) Natalie D'Alessandro / Bruce Waddell (Russia) Ekaterina Katashinskaia / Aleksandr Vaskovich
20	(Canada) Stephen Gogolev (Russia) Ilya Yablokov (Russia) Gleb Lutfullin	(South Korea) Park Yeon-jeong (Russia) Maiia Khromykh	(Russia) Alina Pepeleva / Roman Pleshkov	(Canada) Emmy Bronsard / Aissa Bouaraguia (Canada) Nadiia Bashynska / Peter Beaumont
18	(South Korea) Lee Si-hyeong (United States) Andrew Torgashev	(Japan) Nana Araki	(United States) Kate Finster / Balazs Nagy	(Czech Republic) Natálie Taschlerová / Filip Taschler (Canada) Miku Makita / Tyler Gunara
16	—N/a	(Japan) Mana Kawabe	(Russia) Anna Shcheglova / Ilia Kalashnikov (China) Wang Huidi / Jia Ziqi	(United States) Katarina Wolfkostin / Jeffrey Chen
15	(Ukraine) Ivan Shmuratko	—N/a	—N/a	
14	—N/a	(South Korea) Ji Seo-yeon (Japan) Tomoe Kawabata (Japan) Chisato Uramatsu	—N/a	
13	(Canada) Aleksa Rakic (United States) Ilia Malinin	(Italy) Alessia Tornaghi	—N/a	
12	(Canada) Joseph Phan (United States) Ryan Dunk	—N/a	(Canada) Brooke McIntosh / Brandon Toste	(United States) Ella Ales / Daniel Tsarik
11	(Russia) Andrei Kutovoi (Israel) Mark Gorodnitsky	(Japan) Rino Matsuike (Poland) Ekaterina Kurakova	—N/a	(Russia) Angelina Lazareva / Maksim Prokofiev (United States) Oona Brown / Gage Brown (Ukraine) Maria Golubtsova / Kirill Belobrov
10	(France) Adam Siao Him Fa (Estonia) Aleksandr Selevko	(United States) Isabelle Inthisone	—N/a	(United States) Molly Cesanek / Yehor Yehorov (Japan) Utana Yoshida / Shingo Nishiyama
9	(Russia) Egor Rukhin (Canada) Alec Guinzbourg	(Italy) Lara Naki Gutmann	(Russia) Stanislava Vislobokova / Aleksei Briukhanov	(United States) Katarina DelCamp / Ian Somerville
8	—N/a	(Georgia (country)) Alina Urushadze	(Georgia (country)) Alina Butaeva / Luka Berulava (Ukraine) Kateryna Dzitsiuk / Ivan Pavlov	(France) Lou Terreau / Noé Perron (France) Marie Dupayage / Thomas Nabais
7	(South Korea) Cha Young-hyun	(Estonia) Eva Lotta Kiibus	(North Korea) Ro Hyang-mi / Han Kum-chol	(Estonia) Katerina Bunina / Artur Gruzdev (Canada) Irina Galiyanova / Grayson Lochhead
6	(Canada) Iliya Kovler (Italy) Gabriele Frangipani	(Estonia) Niina Petrokina (Bulgaria) Maria Levushkina	—N/a	(United Kingdom) Sasha Fear / George Waddell
5	(United States) Matthew Nielsen (Czech Republic) Matyáš Bělohradský	(Canada) Kaiya Ruiter (United States) Kate Wang (Canada) Emily Bausback (United States) Gabriella Izzo	(Canada) Kelly Ann Laurin / Loucas Éthier	(Russia) Tamara Zhukova / Daniil Karpov
4	(Japan) Kao Miura (United States) Joseph Klein (United States) Maxim Naumov	(Canada) Alison Schumacher (United States) Hanna Harrell (United States) Emilia Murdock	(Canada) Gabrielle Levesque / Pier-Alexandre Hudon (United States) Anastasiia Smirnova / Danylo Siianytsia	(Italy) Carolina Portesi Peroni / Michael Chrastecky (Italy) Francesca Righi / Aleksei Dubrovin (Israel) Mariia Nosovitskaya / Mikhail Nosovitskiy
3	(Austria) Luc Maierhofer (Belarus) Alexander Lebedev (Germany) Denis Gurdzhi (South Korea) Kyeong Jae-seok (Canada) Eric Liu (Estonia) Mihhail Selevko	(Japan) Rion Sumiyoshi (United States) Lindsay Thorngren (United States) Jessica Lin (Finland) Linnea Ceder (Italy) Lucrezia Gennaro	(Canada) Patricia Andrew / Zachary Daleman (Canada) Chloe Minetta / Benjamin Mimar (France) Cléo Hamon / Denys Strekalin	(Germany) Lara Luft / Stephano Valentino Schuster (Germany) Anne-Marie Wolf / Max Liebers (Hungary) Villo Martin / Danyil Semko (Russia) Svetlana Lizunova / Alexander Vakhnov
2	(China) Li Luanfeng (United Kingdom) Edward Appleby (Canada) Beres Clements (China) Chen Yudong (United States) Dinh Tran (Turkey) Başar Oktar	(South Korea) To Ji-hun (France) Maïa Mazzara (Japan) Moa Iwano	—N/a	
1	(Japan) Sena Miyake (Russia) Matvei Vetlugin (Canada) Corey Circelli	(China) Jin Hengxin (Hungary) Júlia Láng (United States) Sarah Jung (Italy) Ginevra Negrello	—N/a	

=== Qualifiers ===
No.	Men	Ladies	Pairs	Ice dance
1	(Russia) Andrei Mozalev	(Russia) Kamila Valieva	(Russia) Apollinariia Panfilova / Dmitry Rylov	(United States) Avonley Nguyen / Vadym Kolesnik
2	(Japan) Yuma Kagiyama	(United States) Alysa Liu	(Russia) Iuliia Artemeva / Mikhail Nazarychev	(Russia) Elizaveta Shanaeva / Devid Naryzhnyy
3	(Russia) Petr Gumennik	(South Korea) Lee Hae-in	(Russia) Kseniia Akhanteva / Valerii Kolesov	(Russia) Elizaveta Khudaiberdieva / Andrey Filatov
4	(Italy) Daniel Grassl	(Russia) Ksenia Sinitsyna	(Russia) Diana Mukhametzianova / Ilya Mironov	(Georgia (country)) Maria Kazakova / Georgy Reviya
5	(Russia) Daniil Samsonov	(Russia) Daria Usacheva	(Germany) Annika Hocke / Robert Kunkel	(France) Loïcia Demougeot / Théo le Mercier
6	(Japan) Shun Sato	(Russia) Viktoria Vasilieva	(Russia) Alina Pepeleva / Roman Pleshkov	(Russia) Diana Davis / Gleb Smolkin

Alternates

No.	Men	Ladies	Pairs	Ice dance
1	(Russia) Artur Danielian	(Russia) Anna Frolova	(United States) Kate Finster / Balazs Nagy	(Russia) Sofya Tyutyunina / Alexander Shustitskiy
2	(Canada) Stephen Gogolev	(South Korea) Wi Seo-yeong	(Russia) Anna Shcheglova / Ilia Kalashnikov	(Canada) Natalie D'Alessandro / Bruce Waddell
3	(Russia) Ilya Yablokov	(Russia) Anastasia Tarakanova	(China) Wang Huidi / Jia Ziqi	(Russia) Ekaterina Katashinskaia / Aleksandr Vaskovich

== Top scores ==
=== Men's singles ===
Top 10 best scores in the men's combined total
No.	Skater	Nation	Score	Event
1	Shun Sato	Japan	255.11	2019–20 JGP Final
2	Daniil Samsonov	Russia	250.51	2019 JGP Poland
3	Yuma Kagiyama	Japan	245.35	2019 JGP Poland
4	Daniel Grassl	Italy	241.53	2019 JGP Italy
5	Andrei Mozalev	Russia	241.48	2019–20 JGP Final
6	Petr Gumennik	Russia	232.39	2019 JGP Italy
7	Artur Danielian	Russia	223.82	2019 JGP Croatia
8	Ivan Shmuratko	Ukraine	221.44	2019 JGP Italy
9	Lee Si-hyeong	South Korea	218.31	2019 JGP Latvia
10	Ilya Yablokov	Russia	213.40	2019 JGP Italy

Top 10 best scores in the men's short program
No.	Skater	Nation	Score	Event
1	Daniil Samsonov	Russia	87.33	2019 JGP Poland
2	Yuma Kagiyama	Japan	84.72	2019 JGP Poland
3	Artur Danielian	Russia	83.31	2019 JGP Russia
4	Daniel Grassl	Italy	82.77	2019 JGP Italy
5	Andrei Mozalev	Russia	82.45	2019–20 JGP Final
6	Petr Gumennik	Russia	80.99	2019 JGP Italy
7	Andrew Torgashev	United States	80.53	2019 JGP Croatia
8	Shun Sato	Japan	79.19	2019 JGP United States
9	Stephen Gogolev	Canada	78.85	2019 JGP United States
10	Lee Si-hyeong	South Korea	77.30	2019 JGP Latvia

Top 10 best scores in the men's free skating
No.	Skater	Nation	Score	Event
1	Shun Sato	Japan	177.86	2019–20 JGP Final
2	Daniil Samsonov	Russia	163.18	2019 JGP Poland
3	Yuma Kagiyama	Japan	160.63	2019 JGP Poland
4	Andrei Mozalev	Russia	159.03	2019–20 JGP Final
5	Daniel Grassl	Italy	158.76	2019 JGP Italy
6	Petr Gumennik	Russia	151.40	2019 JGP Italy
7	Ivan Shmuratko	Ukraine	146.18	2019 JGP Italy
8	Lee Si-hyeong	South Korea	144.82	2019 JGP Croatia
9	Ilya Yablokov	Russia	143.01	2019 JGP Italy
10	Artur Danielian	Russia	141.71	2019 JGP Croatia

=== Ladies' singles ===
Top 10 best scores in the ladies' combined total
No.	Skater	Nation	Score	Event
1	Kamila Valieva	Russia	221.95	2019 JGP Russia
2	Ksenia Sinitsyna	Russia	215.58	2019 JGP Italy
3	Alysa Liu	United States	208.10	2019 JGP United States
4	Lee Hae-in	South Korea	203.40	2019 JGP Croatia
5	Daria Usacheva	Russia	200.37	2019–20 JGP Final
6	Viktoria Vasilieva	Russia	198.79	2019 JGP Russia
7	Anastasia Tarakanova	Russia	194.74	2019 JGP Poland
8	Rino Matsuike	Japan	193.03	2019 JGP Latvia
9	Wi Seo-yeong	South Korea	191.07	2019 JGP France
10	Maiia Khromykh	Russia	190.73	2019 JGP Latvia

Top 10 best scores in the ladies' short program
No.	Skater	Nation	Score	Event
1	Ksenia Sinitsyna	Russia	74.65	2019 JGP Italy
2	Kamila Valieva	Russia	73.56	2019 JGP Russia
3	Alysa Liu	United States	71.19	2019–20 JGP Final
4	Daria Usacheva	Russia	71.09	2019 JGP Croatia
5	Lee Hae-in	South Korea	69.29	2019 JGP Croatia
6	Maiia Khromykh	Russia	68.93	2019 JGP Latvia
7	Anastasia Tarakanova	Russia	68.14	2019 JGP Poland
8	Viktoria Vasilieva	Russia	68.07	2019–20 JGP Final
9	Anna Frolova	Russia	67.93	2019 JGP Croatia
10	Tomoe Kawabata	Japan	67.70	2019 JGP Poland

Top 10 best scores in the ladies' free skating
No.	Skater	Nation	Score	Event
1	Kamila Valieva	Russia	148.39	2019 JGP Russia
2	Ksenia Sinitsyna	Russia	140.93	2019 JGP Italy
3	Alysa Liu	United States	138.99	2019 JGP Poland
4	Lee Hae-in	South Korea	134.11	2019 JGP Croatia
5	Viktoria Vasilieva	Russia	131.75	2019 JGP Russia
6	Daria Usacheva	Russia	130.22	2019–20 JGP Final
7	Rino Matsuike	Japan	126.62	2019 JGP Latvia
8	Anastasia Tarakanova	Russia	126.60	2019 JGP Poland
9	Wi Seo-yeong	South Korea	125.32	2019 JGP France
10	Nana Araki	Japan	122.75	2019 JGP Russia

=== Pairs ===
Top 10 best scores in the pairs' combined total
No.	Team	Nation	Score	Event
1	Apollinariia Panfilova / Dmitry Rylov	Russia	192.73	2019 JGP Poland
2	Kseniia Akhanteva / Valerii Kolesov	Russia	185.05	2019 JGP Russia
3	Diana Mukhametzianova / Ilya Mironov	Russia	184.37	2019–20 JGP Final
4	Iuliia Artemeva / Mikhail Nazarychev	Russia	179.83	2019 JGP Croatia
5	Alina Pepeleva / Roman Pleshkov	Russia	172.53	2019–20 JGP Final
6	Kate Finster / Balazs Nagy	United States	166.22	2019 JGP Poland
7	Stanislava Vislobokova / Aleksei Briukhanov	Russia	166.18	2019 JGP Russia
8	Ro Hyang-mi / Han Kum-chol	North Korea	161.13	2019 JGP Russia
9	Annika Hocke / Robert Kunkel	Germany	159.22	2019–20 JGP Final
10	Anna Shcheglova / Ilia Kalashnikov	Russia	150.36	2019 JGP Poland

Top 10 best scores in the pairs' short program
No.	Team	Nation	Score	Event
1	Apollinariia Panfilova / Dmitry Rylov	Russia	70.97	2019 JGP Poland
2	Kseniia Akhanteva / Valerii Kolesov	Russia	67.62	2019 JGP Russia
3	Iuliia Artemeva / Mikhail Nazarychev	Russia	67.12	2019 JGP Russia
4	Diana Mukhametzianova / Ilya Mironov	Russia	64.90	2019–20 JGP Final
5	Alina Pepeleva / Roman Pleshkov	Russia	64.67	2019–20 JGP Final
6	Kate Finster / Balazs Nagy	United States	60.91	2019 JGP Poland
7	Annika Hocke / Robert Kunkel	Germany	60.74	2019 JGP Croatia
8	Stanislava Vislobokova / Aleksei Briukhanov	Russia	60.26	2019 JGP Russia
9	Wang Huidi / Jia Ziqi	China	60.19	2019 JGP Croatia
10	Anna Shcheglova / Ilia Kalashnikov	Russia	56.63	2019 JGP Croatia

Top 10 best scores in the pairs' free skating
No.	Team	Nation	Score	Event
1	Apollinariia Panfilova / Dmitry Rylov	Russia	121.76	2019 JGP Poland
2	Diana Mukhametzianova / Ilya Mironov	Russia	119.47	2019–20 JGP Final
3	Kseniia Akhanteva / Valerii Kolesov	Russia	117.43	2019 JGP Russia
4	Iuliia Artemeva / Mikhail Nazarychev	Russia	117.39	2019 JGP Croatia
5	Alina Pepeleva / Roman Pleshkov	Russia	107.86	2019–20 JGP Final
6	Stanislava Vislobokova / Aleksei Briukhanov	Russia	105.92	2019 JGP Russia
7	Ro Hyang-mi / Han Kum-chol	North Korea	105.77	2019 JGP Russia
8	Kate Finster / Balazs Nagy	United States	105.31	2019 JGP Poland
9	Anna Shcheglova / Ilia Kalashnikov	Russia	99.83	2019 JGP Poland
10	Annika Hocke / Robert Kunkel	Germany	99.75	2019–20 JGP Final

=== Ice dance ===
Top 10 season's best scores in the combined total (ice dance)
No.	Team	Nation	Score	Event
1	Maria Kazakova / Georgy Reviya	Georgia	174.90	2019–20 JGP Final
2	Avonley Nguyen / Vadym Kolesnik	United States	174.74	2019–20 JGP Final
3	Elizaveta Shanaeva / Devid Naryzhnyy	Russia	171.07	2019 JGP Russia
4	Elizaveta Khudaiberdieva / Andrey Filatov	Russia	165.59	2019 JGP Latvia
5	Loïcia Demougeot / Théo Le Mercier	France	162.70	2019 JGP Poland
6	Ekaterina Katashinskaia / Aleksandr Vaskovich	Russia	162.19	2019 JGP Poland
7	Diana Davis / Gleb Smolkin	Russia	160.17	2019 JGP United States
8	Sofya Tyutyunina / Alexander Shustitskiy	Russia	154.39	2019 JGP Croatia
9	Miku Makita / Tyler Gunara	Canada	154.11	2019 JGP Poland
10	Natalie D'Alessandro / Bruce Waddell	Canada	152.76	2019 JGP Italy

Top 10 season's best scores in the rhythm dance
No.	Team	Nation	Score	Event
1	Avonley Nguyen / Vadym Kolesnik	United States	69.20	2019 JGP Poland
2	Maria Kazakova / Georgy Reviya	Georgia	68.76	2019–20 JGP Final
3	Elizaveta Shanaeva / Devid Naryzhnyy	Russia	67.70	2019 JGP Russia
4	Loïcia Demougeot / Théo Le Mercier	France	65.82	2019 JGP Poland
5	Elizaveta Khudaiberdieva / Andrey Filatov	Russia	65.52	2019 JGP Italy
6	Diana Davis / Gleb Smolkin	Russia	64.79	2019 JGP Russia
7	Sofya Tyutyunina / Alexander Shustitskiy	Russia	64.34	2019 JGP Croatia
8	Ekaterina Katashinskaia / Alexander Vaskovich	Russia	64.23	2019 JGP Poland
9	Natalie D'Alessandro / Bruce Waddell	Canada	63.25	2019 JGP Italy
10	Miku Makita / Tyler Gunara	Canada	62.25	2019 JGP Poland

Top 10 season's best scores in the free dance
No.	Team	Nation	Score	Event
1	Maria Kazakova / Georgy Reviya	Georgia	106.14	2019–20 JGP Final
2	Avonley Nguyen / Vadym Kolesnik	United States	106.02	2019–20 JGP Final
3	Elizaveta Shanaeva / Devid Naryzhnyy	Russia	103.37	2019 JGP Russia
4	Elizaveta Khudaiberdieva / Andrey Filatov	Russia	100.46	2019 JGP Latvia
5	Diana Davis / Gleb Smolkin	Russia	98.05	2019 JGP United States
6	Ekaterina Katashinskaia / Aleksandr Vaskovich	Russia	97.96	2019 JGP Poland
7	Loïcia Demougeot / Théo Le Mercier	France	97.23	2019 JGP France
8	Katarina Wolfkostin / Jeffrey Chen	United States	93.90	2019 JGP Russia
9	Emmy Bronsard / Aissa Bouaraguia	Canada	92.98	2019 JGP France
10	Sofya Tyutyunina / Alexander Shustitskiy	Russia	91.97	2019 JGP Latvia
