= Amelita Baltar =

Argentine singer

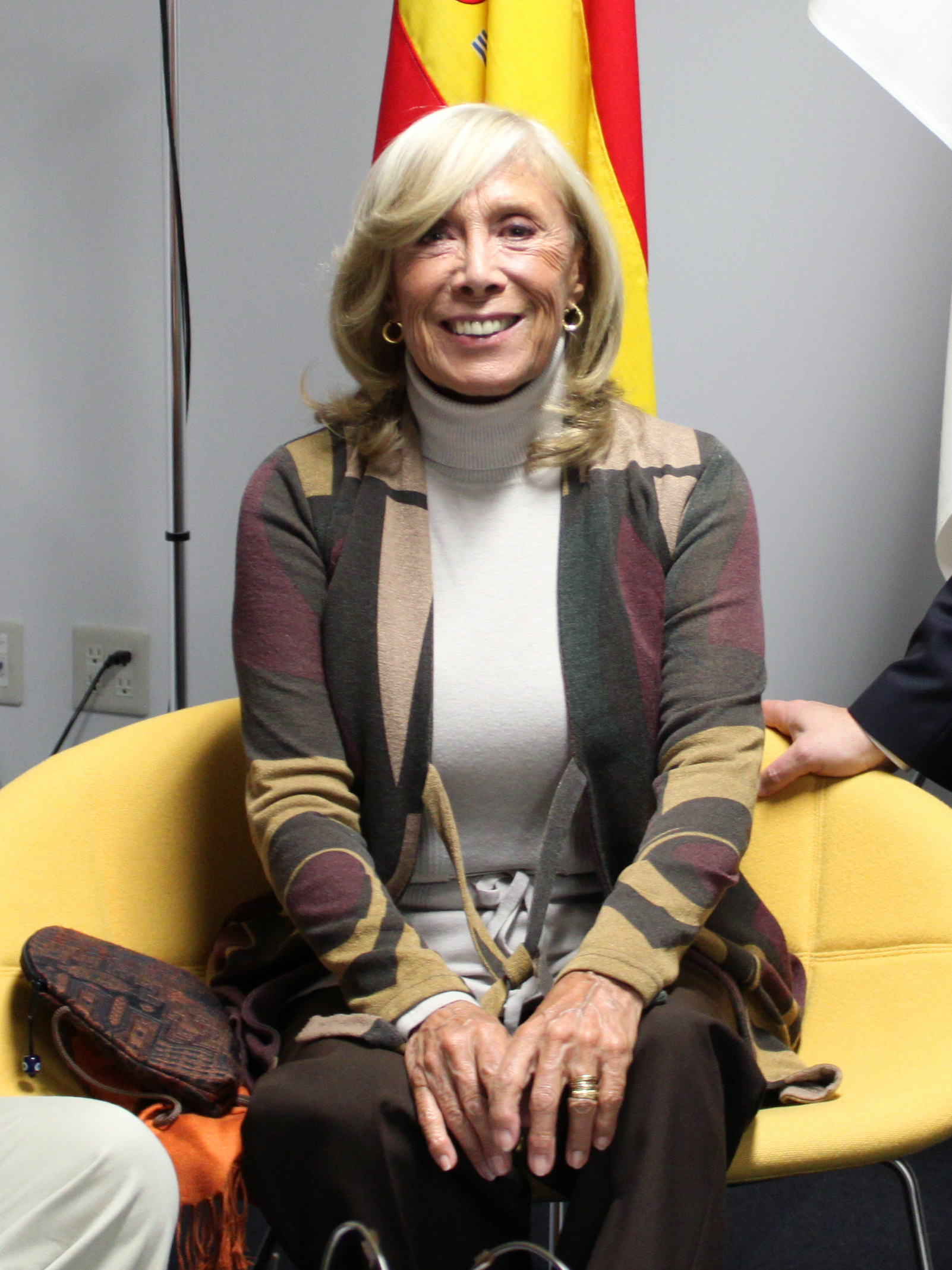
Amelita Baltar in 2016.

María Amelia Baltar (September 24, 1940), better known as Amelita Baltar, is an Argentine singer, one of the leading voices of tango, that appeared in the 60's to be considered, along with Susana Rinaldi, as a modern counterpart of older divas such as Libertad Lamarque and Tita Merello. She is mostly known for her collaboration with composer Astor Piazzolla and writer Horacio Ferrer, specially as first performer of their song “Balada para un loco”. She starred in places such as Olympia (Paris), De Kleine Komedie (Amsterdam), Cemal Reşit Rey Concert Hall (Istanbul, Turkey), Cocoanut Grove at Ambassador Hotel (Los Angeles) or Ginásio do Maracanãzinho (Rio de Janeiro) and shared the stage with celebrities such as Charles Aznavour, Franck Pourcel, Henry Mancini, Gerry Mulligan, Gary Burton and Chick Corea.

== Biography ==
=== Early life and career ===
Unlike most tango artists she was born in the upper-class neighbourhood of Barrio Norte, Buenos Aires and was raised at the countryside in Junín, Buenos Aires Province.

She studied to become a school teacher and started her musical career as a singer of Argentine folk music with the band “Sombras”.

=== The Piazzolla years ===
Piazzolla discovered her by chance and offered her to star in his opera María de Buenos Aires.

He also started to write along with Ferrer songs for her to sing, among which “Balada para un loco” is the most famous one. Its first performance at Estadio Luna Park in 1969 aroused a scandal reminiscent of Igor Stravinsky's “The rite of spring” riot in 1913. Immediately released as a single by CBS Records International, it sold 200.000 copies in just a few weeks, thing that could only be achieved at the time in Argentina by foreigner stars such as The Beatles or local pop singers such as Palito Ortega and Sandro de América. International success followed with performances all around the world, including a half-Italian version which was broadcast on RAI TV.

Back in Argentina, she performed “El gordo triste”, Piazzolla and Ferrer's tribute to Aníbal Troilo, in the presence of the honoree.

=== After Piazzolla ===
After the split with Piazzolla in 1975 she started singing traditional tangos such as “El día que me quieras”, “Volver” and “Soledad” by Carlos Gardel, “Uno”and “Grisel” by Mariano Mores, “Cambalache” and “Yira yira” by Enrique Santos Discépolo or “La última copa” by Francisco Canaro.

But, just as Piazzolla kept performing the Ferrer songs with Italian singer Milva, so did Amelita, and in 2002 she returned to the Estadio Luna Park to perform again “Balada para un loco”, this time for international ballet star Julio Bocca to dance to.

=== Present ===
In 2010 she appeared in the “Buenos Aires by night: The ultimate electronic tango voyage” DVD with the song “Frío Intenso”.

In 2012 she released the CD “El nuevo rumbo” featuring the famous rock singers Fito Páez, Pedro Aznar, Fernando Ruiz Díaz from Catupecu Machu and specially Luis Alberto Spinetta in one of his last recordings before dying.

In her CD “Amelita Baltar canta Vinicius y Piazzolla – Bossa & Tango” released in July 2015 beside the Piazzolla classics she performs Bossa nova songs by their friend Vinicius de Moraes.

A symphonic tribute to Horacio Ferrer recorded at the Solís Theatre (Montevideo) in June 2015 is due to be released.

== Discography ==
- Para usted... (1968)
- María de Buenos Aires (1969)
- Amelita Baltar con Piazzolla y Ferrer (1970)
- La bicicleta blanca (1971)
- Piazzolla, Baltar, Ferrer (1972)
- Cantándole a mi tierra (1973)
- Nostalgias (1978)
- Como nunca (1989)
- Tangamente (1993)
- Amelita Baltar (1994)
- Baltar com Piazzolla (1995 ed. Brasil)
- Astor Piazzolla Colección (1998 Ed. Germany)
- Leyendas (1999)
- Referencias (1999)
- Amelita de todos los tangos (2001)
- El nuevo rumbo (2012)
- Amelita Baltar canta Vinicius y Piazzolla – Bossa & Tango (2015)
