= 2023 World Figure Skating Championships =

Figure skating competition

- Type: ISU Championship
- Date: March 22 – 26
- Season: 2022–23
- Location: Saitama, Japan
- Host: Japan Skating Federation
- Venue: Saitama Super Arena

Champions
- Men's singles: (Japan) Shoma Uno
- Women's singles: (Japan) Kaori Sakamoto
- Pairs: (Japan) Riku Miura and Ryuichi Kihara
- Ice dance: (United States) Madison Chock and Evan Bates
- Previous: 2022 World Championships
- Next: 2024 World Championships

The 2023 World Figure Skating Championships were held from March 22 to 26, 2023, at the Saitama Super Arena in Saitama, Japan. Sanctioned by the International Skating Union (ISU), the World Championships are considered the most prestigious event in figure skating. Medals were awarded in men's singles, women's singles, pair skating, and ice dance. The competition determined the entry quotas for each skating federation at the 2024 World Championships. Shoma Uno and Kaori Sakamoto, both of Japan, won the men's and women's events, respectively. Riku Miura and Ryuichi Kihara of Japan won the pairs event, and Madison Chock and Evan Bates of the United States won the ice dance event.

== Background ==
The World Figure Skating Championships are considered the most prestigious event in figure skating. The 2023 World Championships were held from March 22 to 26, 2023, at the Saitama Super Arena in Saitama, Japan.

== Qualification ==
Based on the results of the 2022 World Championships, each ISU member nation could field one to three entries per discipline. Skaters from Russia and Belarus were banned from participating "until further notice" due to the 2022 Russian invasion of Ukraine.

Number of entries per discipline
Spots	Men	Women	Pairs	Ice dance
3	Japan; United States	Belgium; Japan; South Korea; United States	Canada; Japan; United States	France; United States
2	Canada; France; Georgia; Italy	Azerbaijan; Georgia; Germany	Austria; France; Georgia; Germany; Great Britain; Netherlands	Canada; Great Britain; Italy; Lithuania; Spain

== Changes to preliminary entries ==
The International Skating Union published the initial list of entrants on February 28, 2023.

Changes to preliminary entries
Date	Discipline	Withdrew	Added	Reason	Ref.
February 24	Ice dance	(United States); Kaitlin Hawayek; Jean-Luc Baker	(United States); Christina Carreira; Anthony Ponomarenko	Continued recovery	
March 18	Men	(Hungary); Aleksandr Vlasenko	—N/a	Health problems	

== Required performance elements ==
=== Single skating ===
Women competing in single skating first performed their short programs on Wednesday, March 22, while men performed theirs on Thursday, March 23. Lasting no more than 2 minutes 40 seconds, the short program had to include the following elements:

For men: one double or triple Axel; one triple or quadruple jump; one jump combination consisting of a double jump and a triple jump, two triple jumps, or a quadruple jump and a double jump or triple jump; one flying spin; one camel spin or sit spin with a change of foot; one spin combination with a change of foot; and a step sequence using the full ice surface.

For women: one double or triple Axel; one triple jump; one jump combination consisting of a double jump and a triple jump, or two triple jumps; one flying spin; one layback spin, sideways leaning spin, camel spin, or sit spin without a change of foot; one spin combination with a change of foot; and one step sequence using the full ice surface.

Women performed their free skates on Friday, March 24, while men performed theirs on Saturday, March 25. The free skate could last no more than 4 minutes, and had to include the following: seven jump elements, of which one had to be an Axel-type jump; three spins, of which one had to be a spin combination, one a flying spin, and one a spin with only one position; a step sequence; and a choreographic sequence.

=== Pair skating ===
Couples competing in pair skating performed their short programs on Wednesday, March 22. Lasting no more than 2 minutes 40 seconds, the short program had to include the following elements: one pair lift, one double or triple twist lift, one double or triple throw jump, one double or triple solo jump, one solo spin combination with a change of foot, one death spiral, and a step sequence using the full ice surface.

Couples performed their free skates on Thursday, March 23. The free skate could last no more than 4 minutes, and had to included the following elements: three pair lifts, of which one had to be a twist lift; two different throw jumps; one solo jump; one jump combination or sequence; one pair spin combination; one death spiral; and a choreographic sequence.

=== Ice dance ===
Couples competing in ice dance performed their rhythm dances on Friday, March 24. Lasting no more than 2 minutes 50 seconds, the rhythm dance this season had to include at least two different Latin dance styles. Examples of applicable dance styles included the following: salsa, bachata, merengue, mambo, cha-cha-cha, rhumba, and samba. The required pattern dance element had to be skated to a different Latin style. The rhythm dance had to include the following elements: one pattern dance step sequence, one choreographic rhythm sequence, one dance lift, one set of sequential twizzles, and one step sequence.

Couples then performed their free dances on Saturday, March 25. The free dance could last no longer than 4 minutes, and had to include the following: three short dance lifts or one short dance lift and one combination lift, one dance spin, one set of synchronized twizzles, one step sequence in hold, one turns sequence while on one skate and not touching, and three choreographic elements.

== Judging ==
All of the technical elements in any figure skating performance – such as jumps and spins – were assigned a predetermined base point value and were then scored by a panel of nine judges on a scale from –5 to 5 based on their quality of execution. The judging panel's Grade of Execution (GOE) was determined by calculating the trimmed mean (the average after discarding the highest and lowest scores), and this GOE was added to the base value to come up with the final score for each element. The panel's scores for all elements were added together to generate a total element score. At the same time, the judges evaluated each performance based on five program components – skating skills, transitions, performance, composition, and interpretation of the music – and assigned a score from 0.25 to 10 in 0.25-point increments. The judging panel's final score for each program component was also determined by calculating the trimmed mean. Those scores were then multiplied by the factor shown on the following chart; the results were added together to generate a total program component score.

Program component factoring
Discipline	Short program or Rhythm dance	Free skate or Free dance
Men	1.00	2.00
Women	0.08	1.60
Pairs	0.08	1.60
Ice dance	0.08	1.20

Deductions were applied for certain violations like time infractions, stops and restarts, or falls. The total element score and total program component score were added together, minus any deductions, to generate a final performance score for each skater or team.

== Medal summary ==
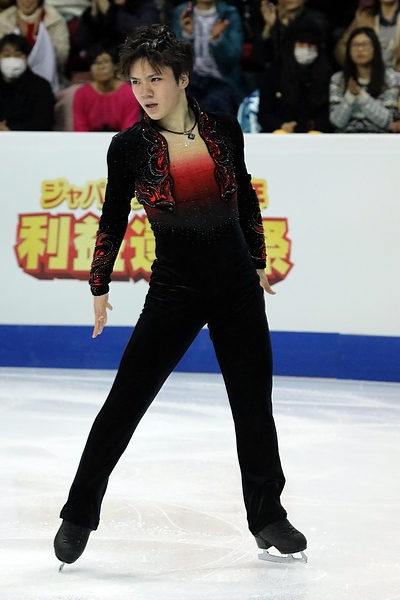
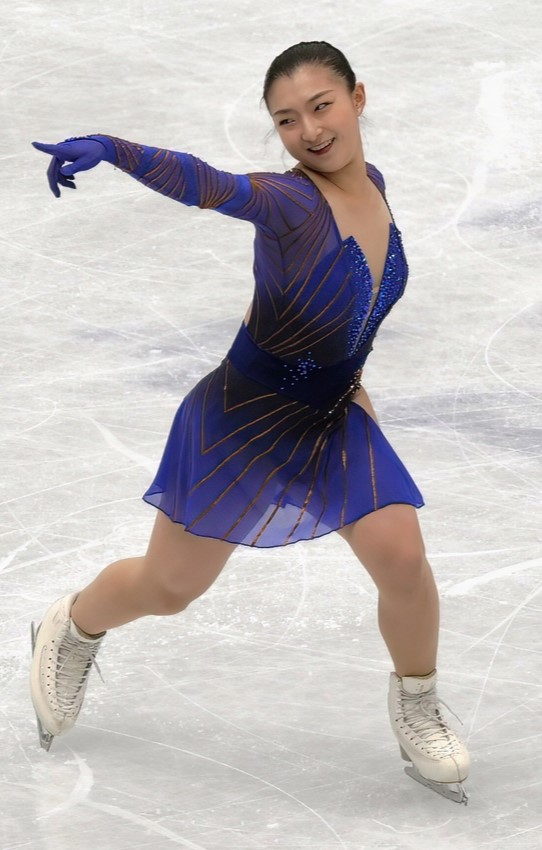
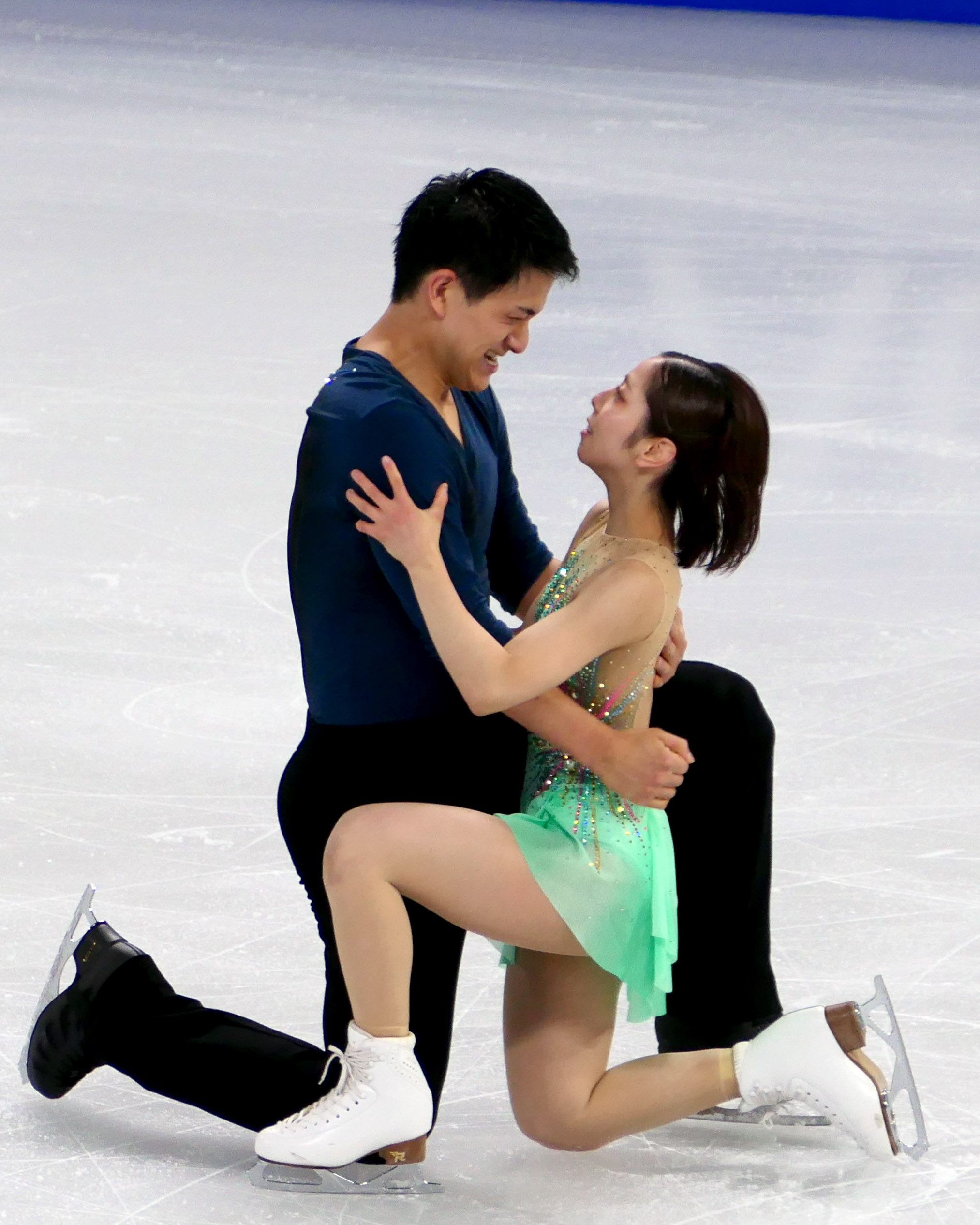
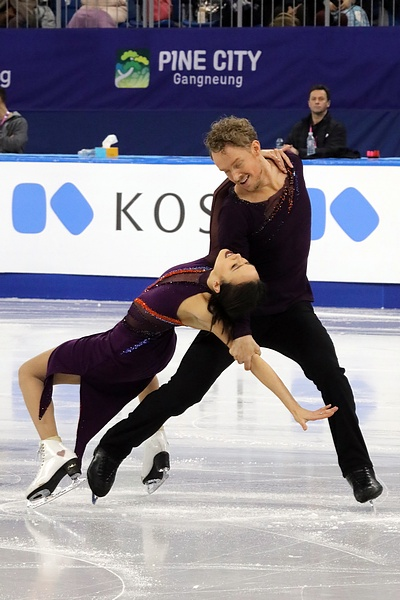
From left to right: The 2023 World Champions: Shoma Uno of Japan (men's singles); Kaori Sakamoto of Japan (women's singles); Riku Miura and Ryuichi Kihara of Japan (pair skating); and Madison Chock and Evan Bates of the United States (ice dance)

=== Medalists ===
Medals were awarded to the skaters or teams who achieved the highest overall placements in each discipline.

Medal recipients
Discipline	Gold	Silver	Bronze
Men	(Japan); Shoma Uno	(South Korea); Cha Jun-hwan	(United States); Ilia Malinin
Women	(Japan); Kaori Sakamoto	(South Korea); Lee Hae-in	(Belgium); Loena Hendrickx
Pairs	(Japan); Riku Miura; Ryuichi Kihara	(United States); Alexa Knierim; Brandon Frazier	(Italy); Sara Conti; Niccolò Macii
Ice dance	(United States); Madison Chock; Evan Bates	(Italy); Charlène Guignard; Marco Fabbri	(Canada); Piper Gilles; Paul Poirier

Small medals were awarded to the skaters or teams who achieved the highest short program or rhythm dance placements in each discipline.

Small medal recipients for highest short program or rhythm dance
Discipline	Gold	Silver	Bronze
Men	(Japan); Shoma Uno	(United States); Ilia Malinin	(South Korea); Cha Jun-hwan
Women	(Japan); Kaori Sakamoto	(South Korea); Lee Hae-in	(Japan); Mai Mihara
Pairs	(Japan); Riku Miura; Ryuichi Kihara	(United States); Alexa Knierim; Brandon Frazier	(Italy); Sara Conti; Niccolò Macii
Ice dance	(United States); Madison Chock; Evan Bates	(Italy); Charlène Guignard; Marco Fabbri	(Canada); Piper Gilles; Paul Poirier

Small medals were awarded to the skaters or teams who achieved the highest free skate or free dance placements in each discipline.

Small medal recipients for highest free skate or free dance
Discipline	Gold	Silver	Bronze
Men	(Japan); Shoma Uno	(South Korea); Cha Jun-hwan	(United States); Ilia Malinin
Women	(South Korea); Lee Hae-in	(Japan); Kaori Sakamoto	(South Korea); Kim Chae-yeon
Pairs	(United States); Alexa Knierim; Brandon Frazier	(Japan); Riku Miura; Ryuichi Kihara	(Italy); Sara Conti; Niccolò Macii
Ice dance	(United States); Madison Chock; Evan Bates	(Italy); Charlène Guignard; Marco Fabbri	(Canada); Piper Gilles; Paul Poirier

=== Medals by country ===
Rank	Nation	Gold	Silver	Bronze	Total
1	Japan	3	0	0	3
2	United States	1	1	1	3
3	South Korea	0	2	0	2
4	Italy	0	1	1	2
5	Belgium	0	0	1	1
5	Canada	0	0	1	1
Totals (6 entries)		4	4	4	12

== Results ==
=== Men's singles ===
Men's results
Rank	Skater	Nation	Total	SP		FS	
1st place, gold medalist(s)	Shoma Uno	Japan	301.14	1	104.63	1	196.51
2nd place, silver medalist(s)	Cha Jun-hwan	South Korea	296.03	3	99.64	2	196.39
3rd place, bronze medalist(s)	Ilia Malinin	United States	288.44	2	100.38	3	188.06
4	Kévin Aymoz	France	282.97	5	95.56	4	187.41
5	Jason Brown	United States	280.04	6	94.17	5	185.87
6	Kazuki Tomono	Japan	273.41	7	92.68	6	180.73
7	Keegan Messing	Canada	265.16	4	98.75	11	166.41
8	Lukas Britschgi	Switzerland	257.34	9	86.18	9	171.16
9	Matteo Rizzo	Italy	256.04	13	79.28	7	176.76
10	Adam Siao Him Fa	France	253.11	12	79.78	8	173.33
11	Vladimir Litvintsev	Azerbaijan	251.76	10	82.71	10	169.05
12	Daniel Grassl	Italy	244.43	8	86.50	14	157.93
13	Deniss Vasiļjevs	Latvia	243.15	11	82.37	13	160.78
14	Mikhail Shaidorov	Kazakhstan	236.93	18	75.41	12	161.52
15	Sōta Yamamoto	Japan	232.39	17	75.48	15	156.91
16	Mark Gorodnitsky	Israel	232.13	14	77.89	16	154.24
17	Mihhail Selevko	Estonia	230.94	15	76.81	17	154.13
18	Andreas Nordebäck	Sweden	223.52	20	73.45	18	150.07
19	Nikita Starostin	Germany	217.87	16	75.53	19	142.34
20	Morisi Kvitelashvili	Georgia	212.32	21	73.05	20	139.27
21	Andrew Torgashev	United States	210.59	22	71.41	21	139.18
22	Jin Boyang	China	204.22	19	75.04	23	129.18
23	Adam Hagara	Slovakia	203.26	24	70.29	22	132.97
24	Maurizio Zandron	Austria	194.31	23	70.36	24	123.95
25	Kyrylo Marsak	Ukraine	68.60	25	68.60	Did not advance to free skate	
26	Conrad Orzel	Canada	67.65	26	67.65	Did not advance to free skate	
27	Tomàs-Llorenç Guarino Sabaté	Spain	67.60	27	67.60	Did not advance to free skate	
28	Burak Demirboğa	Turkey	65.73	28	65.73	Did not advance to free skate	
29	Nika Egadze	Georgia	65.17	29	65.17	Did not advance to free skate	
30	Alexander Zlatkov	Bulgaria	62.31	30	62.31	Did not advance to free skate	
31	Jari Kessler	Croatia	61.94	31	61.94	Did not advance to free skate	
32	Graham Newberry	Great Britain	61.70	32	61.70	Did not advance to free skate	
33	Vladimir Samoilov	Poland	61.48	33	61.48	Did not advance to free skate	
34	Georgii Reshtenko	Czech Republic	59.93	34	59.93	Did not advance to free skate	

=== Women's singles ===
Women's results
Rank	Skater	Nation	Total	SP		FS	
1st place, gold medalist(s)	Kaori Sakamoto	Japan	224.61	1	79.24	2	145.37
2nd place, silver medalist(s)	Lee Hae-in	South Korea	220.94	2	73.62	1	147.32
3rd place, bronze medalist(s)	Loena Hendrickx	Belgium	210.42	5	71.94	4	138.48
4	Isabeau Levito	United States	207.65	4	73.03	5	134.62
5	Mai Mihara	Japan	205.70	3	73.46	6	132.24
6	Kim Chae-yeon	South Korea	203.51	12	64.06	3	139.45
7	Nicole Schott	Germany	197.76	7	67.29	9	130.47
8	Kimmy Repond	Switzerland	194.09	13	62.75	8	131.34
9	Niina Petrõkina	Estonia	193.49	6	68.00	12	125.49
10	Rinka Watanabe	Japan	192.81	15	60.90	7	131.91
11	Nina Pinzarrone	Belgium	191.78	14	62.04	10	129.74
12	Amber Glenn	United States	188.33	10	65.52	14	122.81
13	Madeline Schizas	Canada	187.49	16	60.02	11	127.47
14	Anastasiia Gubanova	Georgia	184.92	11	65.40	15	119.52
15	Bradie Tennell	United States	184.14	8	66.45	16	117.69
16	Ekaterina Kurakova	Poland	181.43	9	65.69	17	115.74
17	Lara Naki Gutmann	Italy	178.43	23	55.22	13	123.21
18	Kim Ye-lim	South Korea	174.30	17	60.02	19	114.28
19	Olga Mikutina	Austria	172.31	20	57.05	18	115.26
20	Julia Sauter	Romania	165.62	22	56.02	20	109.60
21	Janna Jyrkinen	Finland	160.91	21	56.06	21	104.85
22	Lindsay van Zundert	Netherlands	159.55	19	57.56	22	101.99
23	Sofja Stepčenko	Latvia	158.38	18	58.87	24	99.51
24	Alexandra Feigin	Bulgaria	155.74	24	54.65	23	101.09
25	Lorine Schild	France	54.35	25	54.35	Did not advance to free skate	
26	Jade Hovine	Belgium	54.10	26	54.10	Did not advance to free skate	
27	Kristen Spours	Great Britain	53.38	27	53.38	Did not advance to free skate	
28	Ema Doboszová	Slovakia	53.01	28	53.01	Did not advance to free skate	
29	Kristina Isaev	Germany	52.93	29	52.93	Did not advance to free skate	
30	Anastasia Gracheva	Moldova	50.55	30	50.55	Did not advance to free skate	
31	Marilena Kitromilis	Cyprus	48.92	31	48.92	Did not advance to free skate	
32	Eliška Březinová	Czech Republic	47.29	32	47.29	Did not advance to free skate	
33	Daša Grm	Slovenia	47.04	33	47.04	Did not advance to free skate	
34	Júlia Láng	Hungary	44.26	34	44.26	Did not advance to free skate	
35	Mia Risa Gomez	Norway	43.54	35	43.54	Did not advance to free skate	

=== Pairs ===
Pairs' results
Rank	Team	Nation	Total	SP		FS	
1st place, gold medalist(s)	Riku Miura; Ryuichi Kihara	Japan	222.16	1	80.72	2	141.44
2nd place, silver medalist(s)	Alexa Knierim; Brandon Frazier	United States	217.48	2	74.64	1	142.84
3rd place, bronze medalist(s)	Sara Conti; Niccolò Macii	Italy	208.08	3	73.24	3	134.84
4	Deanna Stellato-Dudek; Maxime Deschamps	Canada	199.97	4	72.81	6	127.16
5	Emily Chan; Spencer Akira Howe	United States	194.73	5	70.23	8	124.50
6	Lia Pereira; Trennt Michaud	Canada	193.00	6	65.31	4	127.69
7	Maria Pavlova; Alexei Sviatchenko	Hungary	190.67	8	64.43	7	126.24
8	Anastasia Golubeva; Hektor Giotopoulos Moore	Australia	189.47	11	61.95	5	127.52
9	Annika Hocke; Robert Kunkel	Germany	184.60	15	60.89	9	123.71
10	Alisa Efimova; Ruben Blommaert	Germany	184.46	7	65.23	10	119.23
11	Brooke McIntosh; Benjamin Mimar	Canada	181.95	10	63.33	11	118.62
12	Ellie Kam; Daniel O'Shea	United States	175.59	9	63.40	13	112.19
13	Daria Danilova; Michel Tsiba	Netherlands	173.85	12	61.24	12	112.61
14	Camille Kovalev; Pavel Kovalev	France	172.29	13	61.07	14	111.22
15	Oxana Vouillamoz; Flavien Giniaux	France	157.19	16	58.12	15	99.07
16	Anastasia Vaipan-Law; Luke Digby	Great Britain	153.38	17	55.42	16	97.96
17	Zhang Siyang; Yang Yongchao	China	148.23	20	50.32	17	97.91
18	Isabella Gamez; Aleksandr Korovin	Philippines	147.07	19	53.29	18	93.78
19	Karina Safina; Luka Berulava	Georgia	146.99	14	60.98	20	86.01
20	Nika Osipova; Dmitry Epstein	Netherlands	146.27	18	54.93	19	91.34
21	Federica Simoli; Alessandro Zarbo	Czech Republic	49.59	21	49.59	Did not advance to free skate	
22	Violetta Sierova; Ivan Khobta	Ukraine	44.74	22	44.74	Did not advance to free skate	
23	Lydia Smart; Harry Mattick	Great Britain	43.82	23	43.82	Did not advance to free skate	

=== Ice dance ===
Ice dance results
Rank	Team	Nation	Total	RD		FD	
1st place, gold medalist(s)	Madison Chock / Evan Bates	United States	226.01	1	91.94	1	134.07
2nd place, silver medalist(s)	Charlène Guignard / Marco Fabbri	Italy	219.85	2	88.21	2	131.64
3rd place, bronze medalist(s)	Piper Gilles / Paul Poirier	Canada	217.88	3	87.34	3	130.54
4	Lilah Fear / Lewis Gibson	Great Britain	214.73	4	86.56	5	128.17
5	Laurence Fournier Beaudry / Nikolaj Sørensen	Canada	214.04	5	85.59	4	128.45
6	Caroline Green / Michael Parsons	United States	201.44	6	78.74	6	122.70
7	Allison Reed / Saulius Ambrulevičius	Lithuania	199.20	7	78.70	7	120.50
8	Natálie Taschlerová / Filip Taschler	Czech Republic	196.39	9	76.56	8	119.83
9	Juulia Turkkila / Matthias Versluis	Finland	193.54	8	76.97	9	116.57
10	Christina Carreira / Anthony Ponomarenko	United States	190.10	10	75.24	11	114.86
11	Kana Muramoto / Daisuke Takahashi	Japan	188.87	11	72.92	10	115.95
12	Evgenia Lopareva / Geoffrey Brissaud	France	183.61	12	72.80	13	110.81
13	Maria Kazakova / Georgy Reviya	Georgia	181.22	14	69.43	12	111.79
14	Loïcia Demougeot / Théo Le Mercier	France	176.85	13	69.88	14	106.97
15	Jennifer Janse van Rensburg / Benjamin Steffan	Germany	170.03	15	67.95	16	102.08
16	Holly Harris / Jason Chan	Australia	169.47	16	64.80	15	104.67
17	Mariia Nosovitskaya / Mikhail Nosovitskiy	Israel	163.01	17	64.14	18	98.87
18	Victoria Manni / Carlo Röthlisberger	Italy	162.97	18	64.02	17	98.95
19	Mariia Holubtsova / Kyryl Bielobrov	Ukraine	162.38	19	63.94	19	98.44
20	Mariia Ignateva / Danijil Szemko	Hungary	157.51	20	63.88	20	93.63
21	Marie Dupayage / Thomas Nabais	France	63.81	21	63.81	Did not advance to free dance	
22	Anastasia Polibina / Pavel Golovishnikov	Poland	61.80	22	61.80	Did not advance to free dance	
23	Anna Šimová / Kirill Aksenov	Slovakia	60.16	23	60.16	Did not advance to free dance	
24	Charlotte Lafond-Fournier / Richard Kang In Kam	New Zealand	58.33	24	58.33	Did not advance to free dance	
25	Chen Xizi / Xing Jianing	China	58.12	25	58.12	Did not advance to free dance	
26	Paulina Ramanauskaitė / Deividas Kizala	Lithuania	58.06	26	58.06	Did not advance to free dance	
27	Aurelija Ipolito / Luke Russell	Latvia	55.90	27	55.90	Did not advance to free dance	
28	Solène Mazingue / Marko Jevgeni Gaidajenko	Estonia	55.67	28	55.67	Did not advance to free dance	
29	Adrienne Carhart / Oleksandr Kolosovskyi	Azerbaijan	55.59	29	55.59	Did not advance to free dance	
30	Sofia Val / Asaf Kazimov	Spain	53.94	30	53.94	Did not advance to free dance	
31	Chelsea Verhaegh / Sherim van Geffen	Netherlands	50.94	31	50.94	Did not advance to free dance	
32	Olivia Josephine Shilling / Leo Baeten	Belgium	50.67	32	50.67	Did not advance to free dance	
33	Gaukhar Nauryzova / Boyisangur Datiev	Kazakhstan	47.77	33	47.77	Did not advance to free dance	

== Quotas for the 2024 World Championships ==
Based on the results of the 2023 World Championships, these nations would be eligible to enter more than one skater or team at the 2024 World Figure Skating Championships in the indicated disciplines.

Number of entries per discipline
Spots	Men	Women	Pairs	Ice dance
3	Japan; South Korea; United States	Japan; South Korea	Canada; United States	Canada; United States
2	Canada; France; Italy; Switzerland	Belgium; Estonia; Germany; Switzerland; United States	Australia; Germany; Hungary; Italy	Czech Republic; Finland; France; Great Britain; Italy; Lithuania

== Works cited ==
- "Special Regulations & Technical Rules – Single & Pair Skating and Ice Dance 2021". International Skating Union. Archived from the original on April 4, 2022.
