= Solène Mazingue =

French ice dancer

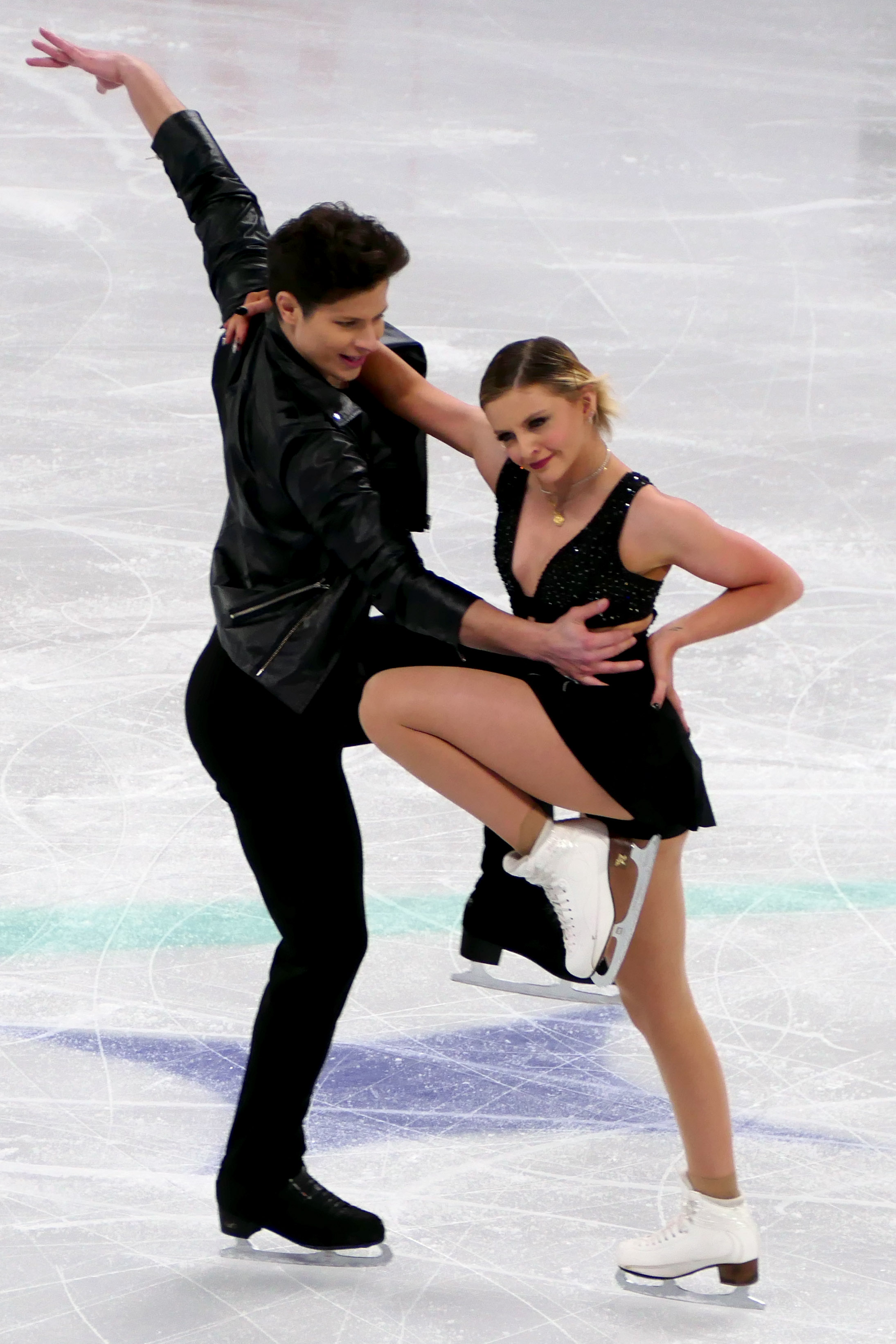
- Solène Mazingue and Marko Jevgeni Gaidajenko at the 2024 World Championships

Personal information
- Born: 11 February 2003 (age 23) Paris, France
- Home town: Versailles, France
- Height: 1.60 m (5 ft 3 in)

Figure skating career
- Country: Estonia (2021–24); France (2018–20)
- Discipline: Ice dance
- Partner: Marko Jevgeni Gaidajenko (2021–24); Maxime Dos Reis (2018–20)
- Coach: Romain Haguenauer; Marie-France Dubreuil; Patrice Lauzon; Pascal Denis; Josée Piché; Sebastien Soldevila; Emilie Bonnavaud; Eva Airapetian
- Skating club: Anna Levandi Figure Skating Club
- Began skating: 2006

Medal record
Estonian Championships
Gold medal – first place	2022 Tallinn	Ice dance
Gold medal – first place	2024 Tallinn	Ice dance

Solène Mazingue (French pronunciation: [sɔlɛn mazɛ̃ɡ]; born 11 February 2003) is a French ice dancer who competes for Estonia.

With former partner, Marko Jevgeni Gaidajenko, she is the 2021 JGP France II bronze medalist, a two time Estonian national champion (2022, 2024), and competed in the final segment at the 2022 European Championships.

== Personal life ==
Mazingue was born on 11 February 2003 in Paris, France. As of 2022, she is a university student studying law.

In November 2024, Mazingue alleged that fellow ice dancer Ivan Desyatov sexually assaulted her in a hotel room during the 2023 CS Golden Spin of Zagreb after she had taken medication prescribed for a brain injury sustained in 2022. Mazingue also accused the Ice Academy of Montreal coaches of not taking her claims seriously, alleging that she had confided in Marie-France Dubreuil about what had happened to her. She further alleged that Dubreuil promised to report the incident to SkateSafe and the leaders of Team USA. However, Dubreuil did not follow through for the U.S. Center for SafeSport did not receive any prior report about the alleged incident until September 2024, which Mazingue filed herself. This report would result in Desyatov receiving an indefinite suspension as SafeSport investigates Mazingue's claims. She would also accuse the Estonian Skating Union of failing to take action upon being made aware of her claims.

== Career ==
=== Early years ===
Mazingue began learning how to skate in 2006 as a three-year-old. By the 2012–13 season, she was competing in ice dance with Jean-Hans Fourneaux for France. The duo trained at Rouen Olympic Club in Rouen.

By 2018, Mazingue had teamed up with Maxime Dos Reis for France. Mazingue/Dos Reis competed together from 2018 to 2020. During their partnership, they appeared at six junior international events and finished sixth at the 2019 and 2020 French Junior Championships. The team split after the onset of the COVID-19 pandemic brought the 2019–20 season to an end. The pandemic made searching for a new partner difficult, but Mazingue eventually arranged a tryout in France with Estonian ice dancer Marko Jevgeni Gaidajenko in December 2020. In January 2021, they announced their partnership.

=== 2021–2022 season ===
Mazingue/Gaidajenko made their international debut in August at the 2021 JGP France II, the second of two events held in Courchevel. There, the team placed fifth in the rhythm dance but rose to third in the free dance to claim the bronze medal overall behind American teams Brown/Brown and Flores/Tsarevski. Their medal marked the first medal for Estonia on the Junior Grand Prix circuit in ice dance since 2011. At their second JGP event, the 2021 JGP Austria, Mazingue/Gaidajenko finished ninth.

Moving up to the senior level, Mazingue/Gaidajenko made their Challenger Series debut in November at the 2021 CS Warsaw Cup. They placed fifteenth at the event. Later in December, they won their first senior national title at the 2022 Estonian Championships before returning to the Challenger Series at the 2021 CS Golden Spin of Zagreb, where they finished ninth. Due to their placement at Estonian nationals, Mazingue/Gaidajenko were assigned to Estonia's berth in ice dance at the 2022 European Championships. On the decision to compete at both levels in one season, atypical in ice dance, Gaidajenko would later note "it's usually more challenging because it's usually absolutely two different rhythm dances, but last season that was the same subject, like a hip hop and street culture. Also, it was both the blues. It's Midnight Blues (senior) and Blues (junior), so it was easier."

At the European Championships, held in Gaidajenko's hometown Tallinn, Mazingue/Gaidajenko set a new personal best in the rhythm dance to qualify to the free dance in twentieth place. They maintained their standing in the free dance and finished twentieth overall. Mazingue/Gaidajenko concluded the season at the 2022 World Championships, held in Montpellier with Russian dance teams absent due to the International Skating Union banning all Russian athletes due to their country's invasion of Ukraine. They qualified to the free dance and finished nineteenth.

=== 2022–2023 season ===
The Russo-Ukrainian War necessitated that Mazingue and Gaidajenko leave their Moscow training location, which had already been inconvenient in terms of visa access. In advance of the next season, they opted to move to train at the Ice Academy of Montreal, widely considered the world's top ice dance training center, under Canadian coaches Marie-France Dubreuil and Patrice Lauzon and Frenchman Romain Haguenauer. They were scheduled to begin the season at the Finlandia Trophy in October, but a week in advance of the event, they had a major training accident. After Gaidajenko tripped while practicing a lift, Mazingue hit her head on the ice, suffering a skull fracture and intracranial bleeding that required surgery.

After months of physiotherapy, Mazingue was allowed to return to the ice in January. Describing her resumption of training later, she said that "the day I finally got on the ice, I started crying because I had so many emotions at once — excitement, sadness, joy. All at once! I cried and hugged Marko and then I knew that nothing can stop me, one day I will become an Olympic champion. Because this accident was crazy, but I came back to the ice and this is my victory."

After resuming training, with Mazingue wearing a protective helmet until March, the team was eventually cleared to compete at the 2023 World Championships in Saitama. Gaidajenko explained that "we made this decision for Solene and for us as a couple. Every person needs a goal to strive for." Mazingue/Gaidajenko placed twenty-eighth in the rhythm dance with a score of 55.67 points. They did not qualify for the free dance, but Mazingue stated afterward that they went in knowing that was unlikely, and that had they managed to do so, they would have withdrawn beforehand as they were not ready for it yet.

As a result of their low placements in the season, the team lost their financial support from the Estonian Skating Union and began to fundraise via GoFundMe.

=== 2023–2024 season ===
Mazingue/Gaidajenko started the season by winning gold at the 2023 NRW Trophy and finishing seventh at the 2023 CS Golden Spin of Zagreb.

They went on to win their second national title at the 2024 Estonian Championships. Selected to compete at the 2024 European Championships in Kaunas, Lithuania, Mazingue/Gaidajenko finished twentieth. Two months later at the 2024 World Championships in Montreal, Quebec, Canada, they place thirty-third in the rhythm dance and failed to advance to the free dance.

In October 2024, it was announced that Mazingue/Gaidajenko's partnership had ended. Mazingue would share that she had been unable to bring herself to skate since the World Championships due to the trauma of having been sexually assaulted in December 2023.

== Programs ==
=== Ice dance with Marko Jevgeni Gaidajenko (for Estonia) ===
Season	Rhythm dance	Free dance
2023–2024	Walk This Way performed by Run-DMC; Push It by Salt-N-Pepa choreo. by Romain Haguenauer, Marie-France Dubreuil, Guillaume Cizeron, Samuel Chouinard, Scott Moir	Black Panther: Wakanda Forever; No Woman, No Cry performed by Tems; Árboles Bajo El Mar by Mare Advertencia Lirika & Vivir Quintana; Lift Me Up by Rihanna choreo. by Romain Haguenauer, Marie-France Dubreuil, Guillaume Cizeron, Samuel Chouinard, Scott Moir
2022–2023	Rhumba: Amado Mio performed by Pink Martini; Cha Cha: Dónde Estás Yolanda by Pink Martini; Rhumba: Amado Mio performed by Pink Martini choreo. by Romain Haguenauer, Marie-France Dubreuil, Guillaume Cizeron, Samuel Chouinard, Scott Moir	Evil Morty by Lucas King; Evil Morty Theme (For the Damaged Coda) by Samuel Kim choreo. by Romain Haguenauer, Marie-France Dubreuil, Guillaume Cizeron, Samuel Chouinard, Scott Moir
2021–2022	Clint Eastwood by Gorillaz; Beggin' performed by Måneskin choreo. by Artem Khromykh	To Build a Home by The Cinematic Orchestra choreo. by Artem Khromykh

== Competitive highlights ==
=== Ice dance with Marko Jevgeni Gaidajenko (for Estonia) ===
- JGP – Event of the ISU Junior Grand Prix Series
- CS – Event of the ISU Challenger Series

Competition placements at senior level
Season	2021–22	2022–23	2023–24
World Championships	19th	28th	33rd
European Championships	20th		20th
Estonian Championships	1st		1st
CS Golden Spin of Zagreb	9th		7th
CS Warsaw Cup	15th		
NRW Trophy			1st

Competition placements at junior level
Season	2021–22
JGP Austria	9th
JGP France	3rd

=== Ice dance with Maxime Dos Reis (for France) ===
Competition placements at junior level
Season	2018–19	2019–20
French Championships	6th	6th
Bosphorus Cup		11th
Ice Star		10th
Master's de Patinage		6th
Mentor Cup	17th	22nd
Pavel Roman Memorial	10th	
Volvo Open Cup		13th

== Detailed results ==
=== Ice dance with Marko Jevgeni Gaidajenko (for Estonia) ===
==== Senior level ====
Results in the 2021–22 season
Date	Event	RD		FD		Total	
Date	Event	P	Score	P	Score	P	Score
Nov 19–20, 2021	(Poland) 2021 CS Warsaw Cup	17	57.83	14	89.71	15	147.54
Dec 4–5, 2021	(Estonia) 2022 Estonian Championships	2	61.95	1	93.60	1	155.55
Dec 9–11, 2021	(Croatia) 2021 CS Golden Spin of Zagreb	8	58.89	9	88.62	9	147.51
Jan 10–16, 2022	(Estonia) 2022 European Championships	20	60.36	20	83.53	20	142.89
Mar 21–27, 2022	(France) 2022 World Championships	20	63.97	19	85.07	19	149.04

Results in the 2022–23 season
Date	Event	RD		FD		Total	
Date	Event	P	Score	P	Score	P	Score
Mar 22–26, 2023	(Japan) 2023 World Championships	28	55.67	—N/a	—N/a	28	55.67

Results in the 2023–24 season
Date	Event	RD		FD		Total	
Date	Event	P	Score	P	Score	P	Score
Dec 6–9, 2023	(Croatia) 2023 CS Golden Spin of Zagreb	6	63.86	6	99.89	7	163.75
Dec 16–17, 2023	(Estonia) 2024 Estonian Championships	1	66.33	1	104.10	1	170.43
Mar 18–24, 2024	(Canada) 2024 World Championships	33	57.09	—N/a	—N/a	33	57.09

==== Junior level ====
Results in the 2021–22 season
Date	Event	RD		FD		Total	
Date	Event	P	Score	P	Score	P	Score
Aug 25–28, 2021	2021 JGP France II	5	54.23	3	84.00	3	138.23
Oct 7–9, 2021	2021 JGP Austria	11	48.81	7	82.42	9	131.23
