= Marko Jevgeni Gaidajenko =

Estonian ice dancer

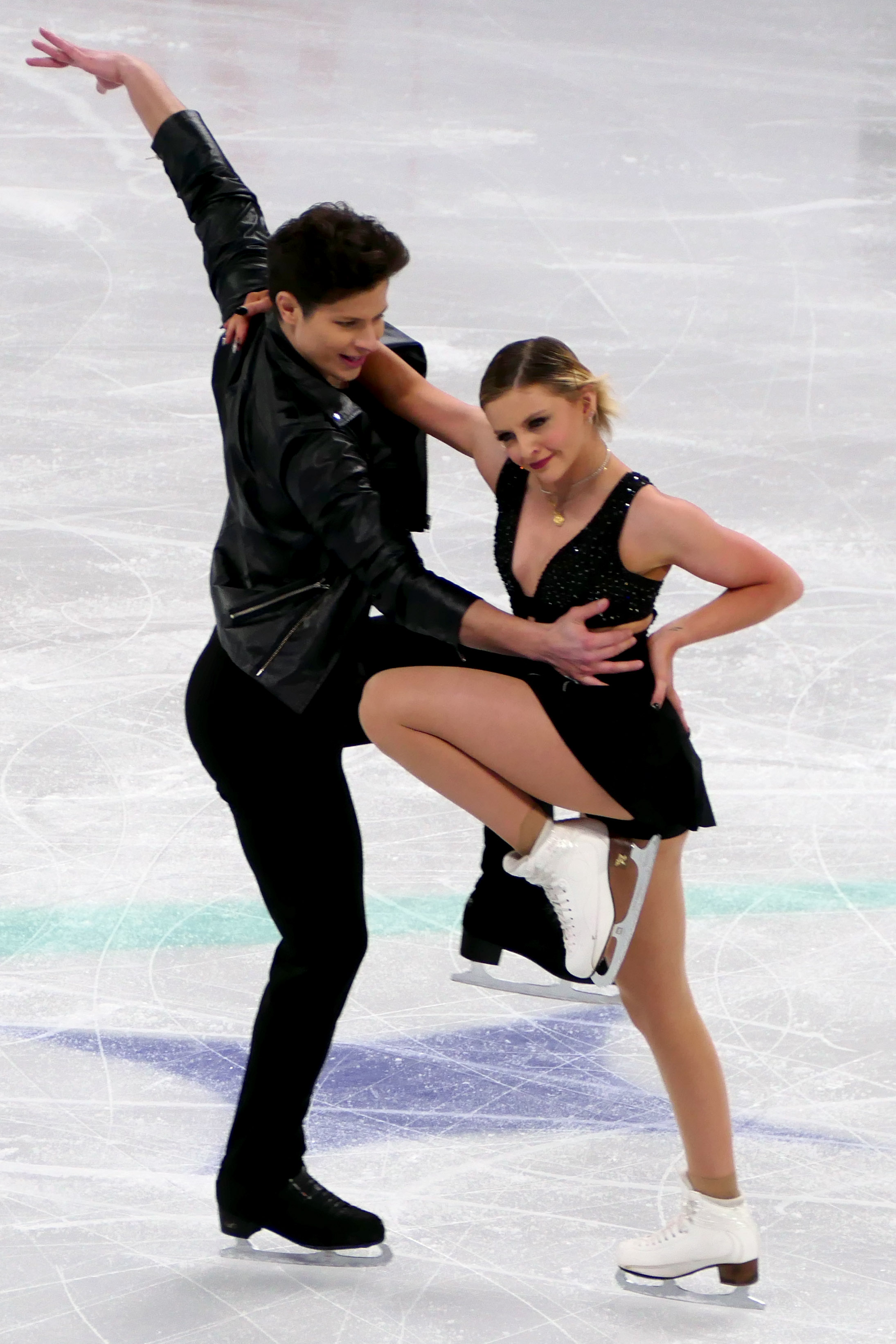
- Gaidajenko and his partner Mazingue at the 2024 World Championships

Personal information
- Full name: Marko Jevgeni Gaidajenko
- Born: 1 November 2001 (age 25) Tallinn, Estonia
- Home town: Montreal, Canada
- Height: 1.80 m (5 ft 11 in)

Figure skating career
- Country: Canada (since 2026); Estonia (2018-24)
- Discipline: Ice dance
- Partner: Alicia Fabbri (since 2026); Solène Mazingue (2021–24); Darja Netjaga (2018–20)
- Coach: Romain Haguenauer; Marie-France Dubreuil; Patrice Lauzon; Pascal Denis; Josée Piché; Sebastien Soldevila; Emilie Bonnavaud; Eva Airapetian
- Skating club: Anna Levandi Figure Skating Club
- Began skating: 2007

Medal record
Estonian Championships
Gold medal – first place	2022 Tallinn	Ice dance
Gold medal – first place	2024 Tallinn	Ice dance

Marko Jevgeni Gaidajenko (born 1 November 2001) is an Estonian ice dancer who currently represents Canada with his skating partner Alicia Fabbri. With Fabbri, he is the 2026 CS Tallinn Trophy silvermealist.

With his former partner, Solène Mazingue, he represented Estonia and is the 2021 JGP France II bronze medalist, a two-time Estonian national champion (2022, 2024), and competed in the final segment at the 2022 European Championships.

== Career ==
=== Early years ===
Gaidajenko began learning to skate in 2007. As a novice ice dancer, he competed with Jessenia Tsenkman.

By 2018, Gaidajenko was skating with Darja Netjaga. The two made their ISU Junior Grand Prix (JGP) debut in October 2018, placing eleventh in Ljubljana, Slovenia. During the following JGP season, Netjaga/Gaidajenko finished twelfth in Latvia and thirteenth in Italy. Ranked twenty-fifth in the rhythm dance, they did not advance to the free dance at the 2020 World Junior Championships in Tallinn. They trained in Tallinn and Moscow, coached by Julia Semjonova and Alexei Gorshkov. The team split after the onset of the COVID-19 pandemic. The pandemic made searching for a new partner difficult, but Gaidajenko eventually arranged a tryout in France with French ice dancer Solène Mazingue in December 2020. In January 2021, they announced their partnership.

=== 2021–2022 season ===
Mazingue/Gaidajenko made their international debut in August at the 2021 JGP France II, the second of two events held in Courchevel. There, the team placed fifth in the rhythm dance but rose to third in the free dance to claim the bronze medal overall behind American teams Brown/Brown and Flores/Tsarevski. Their medal marked the first medal for Estonia on the Junior Grand Prix circuit in ice dance since 2011. At their second JGP event, the 2021 JGP Austria, Mazingue/Gaidajenko finished ninth.

Moving up to the senior level, Mazingue/Gaidajenko made their Challenger Series debut in November at the 2021 CS Warsaw Cup. They placed fifteenth at the event. Later in December, they won their first senior national title at the 2022 Estonian Championships before returning to the Challenger Series at the 2021 CS Golden Spin of Zagreb, where they finished ninth. Due to their placement at Estonian nationals, Mazingue/Gaidajenko were assigned to Estonia's berth in ice dance at the 2022 European Championships. On the decision to compete at both levels in one season, atypical in ice dance, Gaidajenko would later note "it's usually more challenging because it's usually absolutely two different rhythm dances, but last season that was the same subject, like a hip hop and street culture. Also, it was both the blues. It's Midnight Blues (senior) and Blues (junior), so it was easier."

At the European Championships, held in Gaidajenko's hometown Tallinn, Mazingue/Gaidajenko set a new personal best in the rhythm dance to qualify to the free dance in 20th place. They maintained their standing in the free dance and finished twentieth overall. Mazingue/Gaidajenko concluded the season at the 2022 World Championships, held in Montpellier with Russian dance teams absent due to the International Skating Union banning all Russian athletes due to their country's invasion of Ukraine. They qualified to the free dance and finished nineteenth.

=== 2022–2023 season ===
The Russo-Ukrainian War necessitated that Mazingue and Gaidajenko leave their Moscow training location, which had already been inconvenient in terms of visa access. In advance of the next season, they opted to move to train at the Ice Academy of Montreal, widely considered the world's top ice dance training center, under Canadian coaches Marie-France Dubreuil and Patrice Lauzon and Frenchman Romain Haguenauer. They were scheduled to begin the season at the Finlandia Trophy in October, but a week in advance of the event, they had a major training accident. After Gaidajenko tripped while practicing a lift, Mazingue hit her head on the ice, suffering a skull fracture and intracranial bleeding that required surgery.

After months of physiotherapy, Mazingue was allowed to return to the ice in January. Describing her resumption of training later, she said that "the day I finally got on the ice, I started crying because I had so many emotions at once — excitement, sadness, joy. All at once! I cried and hugged Marko and then I knew that nothing can stop me, one day I will become an Olympic champion. Because this accident was crazy, but I came back to the ice and this is my victory."

After resuming training, with Mazingue wearing a protective helmet until March, the team was eventually cleared to compete at the 2023 World Championships in Saitama. Gaidajenko explained that "we made this decision for Solene and for us as a couple. Every person needs a goal to strive for." Mazingue/Gaidajenko placed twenty-eighth in the rhythm dance, with a score of 55.67 points. They did not qualify for the free dance, but Mazingue stated afterward that they went in knowing that was unlikely, and that had they managed to do so, they would have withdrawn beforehand as they were not ready for it yet.

As a result of their low placements in the season, the team lost their financial support from the Estonian Skating Union, and began to fundraise via GoFundMe.

=== 2023–2024 season ===
Mazingue/Gaidajenko started the season by winning gold at the 2023 NRW Trophy and finishing seventh at the 2023 CS Golden Spin of Zagreb.

They went on to win their second national title at the 2024 Estonian Championships. Selected to compete at the 2024 European Championships in Kaunas, Lithuania, Mazingue/Gaidajenko finished twentieth. Two months later at the 2024 World Championships in Montreal, Quebec, Canada, they place thirty-third in the rhythm dance and failed to advance to the free dance.

In October 2024, Gaidajenko announced that his partnership with Mazingue had ended.

=== 2026–2027 season ===
In June 2026, it was announced that Gaidajenko would be entering the Quebec Summer Championships with Alicia Fabbri, representing Canada.

== Programs ==
=== With Mazingue ===
Season	Rhythm dance	Free dance
2023–2024	Walk This Way performed by Run-DMC; Push It by Salt-N-Pepa choreo. by Romain Haguenauer, Marie-France Dubreuil, Guillaume Cizeron, Samuel Chouinard, Scott Moir	Black Panther: Wakanda Forever; No Woman, No Cry performed by Tems; Árboles Bajo El Mar by Mare Advertencia Lirika & Vivir Quintana; Lift Me Up by Rihanna choreo. by Romain Haguenauer, Marie-France Dubreuil, Guillaume Cizeron, Samuel Chouinard, Scott Moir
2022–2023	Rhumba: Amado Mio performed by Pink Martini; Cha Cha: Dónde Estás Yolanda by Pink Martini; Rhumba: Amado Mio performed by Pink Martini	Evil Morty by Lucas King; Evil Morty Theme (For the Damaged Coda) by Samuel Kim
2021–2022	Clint Eastwood by Gorillaz; Beggin' performed by Måneskin choreo. by Artem Khromykh	To Build a Home by The Cinematic Orchestra choreo. by Artem Khromykh

=== With Netjaga ===
Season	Rhythm dance	Free dance
2019–2020	Swing: Puttin' On the Ritz; Foxtrot: Puttin' On the Ritz; Quickstep: Puttin' On the Ritz by Irving Berlin choreo. by Elena Maslennikova	Love of My Life; Death on Two Legs by Queen choreo. by Elena Maslennikova
2018–2019	Tango: Take the Lead by Veronica Verdier; Tango: Tango Mistico by Tanghetto	Love Theme from Romeo and Juliet by Nino Rota, Henry Mancini; Lux Aeterna by Clint Mansell; A Time For Us (from Romeo and Juliet) performed by Barratt Waugh

== Competitive highlights ==
- JGP – Event of the ISU Junior Grand Prix Series
- CS – Event of the ISU Challenger Series

=== Ice dance with Alicia Fabbri ===
Competition placements at senior level
Season	2026–27
CS Nepela Memorial	9th
CS Tallinn Trophy	2nd

=== Ice dance with Solène Mazingue ===
Competition placements at senior level
Season	2021–22	2022–23	2023–24
World Championships	19th	28th	33rd
European Championships	20th		20th
Estonian Championships	1st		1st
CS Golden Spin of Zagreb	9th		7th
CS Warsaw Cup	15th		
NRW Trophy			1st

Competition placements at junior level
Season	2021–22
JGP Austria	9th
JGP France	3rd

=== Ice dance with Darja Netjaga ===
International: Junior
Event	18–19	19–20
Junior Worlds		25th
JGP Italy		13th
JGP Latvia		12th
JGP Slovenia	11th	
Halloween Cup		7th
Mentor Toruń Cup		13th
Tallinn Trophy	5th	
Volvo Open		7th
National
Estonian Champ.	2nd J	1st J

== Detailed results ==
=== Ice dance with Alicia Fabbri ===
ISU personal best scores in the +5/-5 GOE System
Segment	Type	Score	Event
Total	TSS	185.82	2026 CS Tallinn Trophy
Short program	TSS	73.79	2026 CS Tallinn Trophy
Short program	TES	43.33	2026 CS Tallinn Trophy
Short program	PCS	30.53	2026 CS Nepela Memorial
Free skating	TSS	105.77	2026 CS Tallinn Trophy
Free skating	TES	58.97	2026 CS Tallinn Trophy
Free skating	PCS	46.80	2026 CS Tallinn Trophy

Results in the 2026–27 season
Date	Event	RD		FD		Total	
Date	Event	P	Score	P	Score	P	Score
Sep 24–27, 2026	(Slovakia) 2026 CS Nepela Memorial	8	72.08	10	103.00	9	175.08
Nov 16–11, 2026	(Estonia) 2026 CS Tallinn Trophy	2	73.79	2	105.77	2	179.56

=== Ice dance with Solène Mazingue ===
==== Senior level ====
Results in the 2021–22 season
Date	Event	RD		FD		Total	
Date	Event	P	Score	P	Score	P	Score
Nov 19–20, 2021	(Poland) 2021 CS Warsaw Cup	17	57.83	14	89.71	15	147.54
Dec 4–5, 2021	(Estonia) 2022 Estonian Championships	2	61.95	1	93.60	1	155.55
Dec 9–11, 2021	(Croatia) 2021 CS Golden Spin of Zagreb	8	58.89	9	88.62	9	147.51
Jan 10–16, 2022	(Estonia) 2022 European Championships	20	60.36	20	83.53	20	142.89
Mar 21–27, 2022	(France) 2022 World Championships	20	63.97	19	85.07	19	149.04

Results in the 2022–23 season
Date	Event	RD		FD		Total	
Date	Event	P	Score	P	Score	P	Score
Mar 22–26, 2023	(Japan) 2023 World Championships	28	55.67	–	–	28	55.67

Results in the 2023–24 season
Date	Event	RD		FD		Total	
Date	Event	P	Score	P	Score	P	Score
Dec 6–9, 2023	(Croatia) 2023 CS Golden Spin of Zagreb	6	63.86	6	99.89	7	163.75
Dec 16–17, 2023	(Estonia) 2024 Estonian Championships	1	66.33	1	104.10	1	170.43
Mar 18–24, 2024	(Canada) 2024 World Championships	33	57.09	–	–	33	57.09

==== Junior level ====
Results in the 2021–22 season
Date	Event	RD		FD		Total	
Date	Event	P	Score	P	Score	P	Score
Aug 25–28, 2021	2021 JGP France II	5	54.23	3	84.00	3	138.23
Oct 7–9, 2021	2021 JGP Austria	11	48.81	7	82.42	9	131.23
