= 2021 CS Warsaw Cup =

- Type: ISU Challenger Series
- Date: November 17 – 20
- Season: 2021–22
- Location: Warsaw, Poland
- Host: Polish Figure Skating Association
- Venue: Arena COS Torwar

Champions
- Men's singles: (Japan) Sōta Yamamoto
- Women's singles: (Russia) Maiia Khromykh
- Pairs: (Russia) Evgenia Tarasova / Vladimir Morozov
- Ice dance: (Russia) Diana Davis / Gleb Smolkin
- Previous: 2019 CS Warsaw Cup
- Next: 2022 CS Warsaw Cup
- Previous CS: 2021 CS Cup of Austria
- Next CS: 2021 CS Golden Spin of Zagreb

The 2021 CS Warsaw Cup was held on November 17–20 in Warsaw, Poland. It was part of the 2021–22 ISU Challenger Series. Medals were awarded in the disciplines of men's singles, women's singles, pair skating, and ice dance.

== Entries ==
The International Skating Union published the full list of entries on October 18, 2021.

Country	Men	Women	Pairs	Ice dance
Armenia		Marina Asoyan		
Australia	Jordan Dodds		Campbell Young / Lachlan Lewer	
Belarus	Konstantin Milyukov		Ekaterina Yurova / Dmitry Bushlanov	Viktoria Semenjuk / Ilya Yukhimuk
Canada	Wesley Chiu; Stephen Gogolev	Gabrielle Daleman	Lori-Ann Matte / Thierry Ferland; Deanna Stellato-Dudek / Maxime Deschamps	Molly Lanaghan / Dmitre Razgulajevs
Cyprus		Marilena Kitromilis; Emilea Zingas		
Czech Republic	Georgii Reshtenko		Elizaveta Zhuk / Martin Bidař	Natálie Taschlerová / Filip Taschler
Denmark		Maia Sørensen		
Estonia		Nataly Langerbaur; Niina Petrõkina; Kristina Škuleta-Gromova		Solène Mazingue / Marko Jevgeni Gaidajenko; Aleksandra Samersova / Kevin Ojala
Finland		Emmi Peltonen; Jenni Saarinen		Yuka Orihara / Juho Pirinen
France	Yann Frechon	Julie Froetscher	Océane Piegad / Rémi Belmonte	Natacha Lagouge / Arnaud Caffa
Georgia	Irakli Maysuradze	Alina Urushadze	Anastasiia Metelkina / Daniil Parkman	
Germany	Paul Fentz; Kai Jagoda; Thomas Stoll	Kristina Isaev; Nicole Schott; Nathalie Weinzierl	Letizia Roscher / Luis Schuster	Viktoriia Lopusova / Asaf Kazimov; Lara Luft / Maximilian Pfisterer; Anne-Marie Wolf / Max Liebers
Great Britain		Natasha McKay	Anastasia Vaipan-Law / Luke Digby	
Ireland	Samuel McAllister; Conor Stakelum			
Israel	Alexei Bychenko; Mark Gorodnitsky; Nikita Kovalenko	Taylor Morris	Hailey Kops / Evgeni Krasnopolski	Mariia Nosovitskaya / Mikhail Nosovitskiy
Italy	Daniel Grassl; Nikolaj Memola; Raffaele Francesco Zich		Sara Conti / Niccolò Macii	
Japan	Koshiro Shimada; Sōta Yamamoto			Kana Muramoto / Daisuke Takahashi
Lithuania		Aleksandra Golovkina		Paulina Ramanauskaitė / Deividas Kizala
Mongolia		Maral-Erdene Gansukh		
Netherlands		Niki Wories	Daria Danilova / Michel Tsiba	Hanna Jakucs / Alessio Galli
Philippines	Edrian Paul Celestino			
Poland	Kornel Witkowski; Miłosz Witkowski	Karolina Białas; Elżbieta Gabryszak; Ekaterina Kurakova; Natalia Lerka	Anna Hernik / Michal Wozniak	Olexandra Borysova / Aaron Freeman; Anastasia Polibina / Pavel Golovishnikov
Russia	Alexey Erokhov; Petr Gumennik; Ilya Yablokov	Maiia Khromykh	Yasmina Kadyrova / Ivan Balchenko; Alina Pepeleva / Roman Pleshkov; Evgenia Tarasova / Vladimir Morozov	Diana Davis / Gleb Smolkin; Ekaterina Mironova / Evgenii Ustenko; Elizaveta Shanaeva / Devid Naryzhnyy
Slovakia	Adam Hagara			
Spain			Laura Barquero / Marco Zandron; Dorota Broda / Pedro Betegón Martín	
Sweden	Nikolaj Majorov			
Switzerland	Lukas Britschgi			Jasmine Tessari / Stéphane Walker
Ukraine	Ivan Shmuratko	Yelizaveta Babenko; Anastasia Gozhva; Anastasiia Shabotova		Maria Golubtsova / Kirill Belobrov
United States	Jimmy Ma; Eric Sjoberg	Gabriella Izzo; Lindsay Thorngren	Jessica Calalang / Brian Johnson; Emily Chan / Spencer Akira Howe; Chelsea Liu / Danny O'Shea	Caroline Green / Michael Parsons; Eva Pate / Logan Bye

=== Changes to preliminary assignments ===
Date	Discipline	Withdrew	Added	Reason/Other notes	Refs
October 19	Men	(Israel) Daniel Samohin			
October 19	Women	(Chile) Yae-Mia Neira			
October 27	Women	(Czech Republic) Ellen Slavíčková			
October 27	Women	(Israel) Alina Soupian			
October 27	Women	(Mongolia) Merilyn Otgonbayar			
October 27	Ice dance	(Hungary) Emily Monaghan / Ilias Fourati			
October 29	Men	(Armenia) Slavik Hayrapetyan			
October 29	Women	(Georgia (country)) Anastasiia Gubanova			
October 29	Women	(South Korea) Kim Min-chae			
October 29	Women	(Sweden) Matilda Algotsson			
October 29	Pairs	(Sweden) Greta Crafoord / John Crafoord			
November 3	Men	N/A	(Israel) Nikita Kovalenko		
November 3	Women	(Armenia) Valeriia Sidorova			
November 3	Ice dance	(Australia) Holly Harris / Jason Chan			
November 3	Ice dance	(Russia) Anzhelika Abachkina / Pavel Drozd			
November 4	Men	(Japan) Shoma Uno			
November 4	Pairs	(Belarus) Bogdana Lukashevich / Alexander Stepanov			
November 4	Ice dance	(New Zealand) Charlotte Lafond-Fournier / Richard Kang-in Kam			
November 5	Women	(United States) Bradie Tennell			
November 8	Men	(Estonia) Mihhail Selevko			
November 10	Men	(South Korea) Kim Han-gil			
November 10	Women	(Czech Republic) Eliška Březinová			
November 10	Women	(Japan) Yuhana Yokoi		Conflict with Internationaux de France	
November 10	Women	(South Korea) Park Yeon-jeong		Conflict with Internationaux de France	
November 11	Ice dance	(United Kingdom) Lilah Fear / Lewis Gibson			
November 15	Women	(Bulgaria) Maria Levushkina			
November 15	Women	(United Kingdom) Danielle Harrison			
November 15	Women	(United Kingdom) Karly Robertson			
November 15	Pairs	(France) Camille Kovalev / Pavel Kovalev		Conflict with Internationaux de France	
November 15	Pairs	(Georgia (country)) Karina Safina / Luka Berulava			
November 15	Ice dance	(France) Julia Wagret / Pierre Souquet-Basiege	(Russia) Ekaterina Mironova / Evgenii Ustenko		
November 16	Men	(United States) Vincent Zhou			
November 16	Women	(Philippines) Allison Krystle Perticheto			
November 16	Pairs	(Finland) Milania Väänänen / Mikhail Akulov			
November 16	Ice dance	(Georgia (country)) Maria Kazakova / Georgy Reviya		Doctor's recommendations	
November 16	Ice dance	(Japan) Misato Komatsubara / Tim Koleto			
November 17	Men	(France) Xavier Vauclin			
November 17	Women	(Greece) Alexandra Mintsidou			
November 17	Pairs	(Poland) Anna Hernik / Michal Wozniak			
November 17	Ice dance	(Latvia) Aurelija Ipolito / Luke Russell			
November 17	Ice dance	(Poland) Natalia Kaliszek / Maksym Spodyriev			

== Results ==
=== Men ===
Rank	Name	Nation	Total points	SP		FS	
1	Sōta Yamamoto	Japan	247.65	1	91.75	3	155.90
2	Daniel Grassl	Italy	242.96	4	81.74	2	161.22
3	Petr Gumennik	Russia	242.91	3	88.24	4	154.67
4	Wesley Chiu	Canada	232.39	11	70.15	1	162.24
5	Koshiro Shimada	Japan	228.77	2	90.55	9	138.22
6	Alexei Bychenko	Israel	224.40	5	79.35	5	145.05
7	Lukas Britschgi	Switzerland	213.76	6	79.34	12	134.42
8	Alexey Erokhov	Russia	212.54	7	77.41	11	135.13
9	Nikolaj Memola	Italy	211.59	12	69.59	7	142.00
10	Irakli Maysuradze	Georgia	208.80	8	76.86	13	131.94
11	Stephen Gogolev	Canada	206.17	14	67.80	8	138.37
12	Paul Fentz	Germany	205.62	22	62.05	6	143.57
13	Konstantin Milyukov	Belarus	204.28	13	68.77	10	135.51
14	Nikolaj Majorov	Sweden	198.74	15	67.02	14	131.72
15	Ilya Yablokov	Russia	198.32	9	76.41	20	121.91
16	Jimmy Ma	United States	195.09	10	71.49	19	123.60
17	Ivan Shmuratko	Ukraine	190.83	20	64.27	17	126.56
18	Raffaele Francesco Zich	Italy	189.53	23	61.96	16	127.57
19	Eric Sjoberg	United States	189.38	24	60.33	15	129.05
20	Mark Gorodnitsky	Israel	187.88	21	63.90	18	123.98
21	Georgii Reshtenko	Czech Republic	185.83	19	64.30	21	121.53
22	Edrian Paul Celestino	Philippines	177.08	17	66.58	22	110.50
23	Kai Jagoda	Germany	172.07	16	66.80	25	105.27
24	Kornel Witkowski	Poland	170.76	18	64.99	24	105.77
25	Yann Frechon	France	162.89	25	55.67	23	107.22
26	Miłosz Witkowski	Poland	154.94	27	54.01	26	100.93
27	Jordan Dodds	Australia	153.37	26	54.58	27	98.79
28	Conor Stakelum	Ireland	139.55	28	52.25	28	97.30
29	Nikita Kovalenko	Israel	125.49	30	44.95	29	80.54
WD	Thomas Stoll	Germany	withdrew	29	47.36	withdrew from competition	
WD	Samuel McAllister	Ireland	withdrew	withdrew from competition			
WD	Adam Hagara	Slovakia	withdrew	withdrew from competition			

=== Women ===
Rank	Name	Nation	Total points	SP		FS	
1	Maiia Khromykh	Russia	194.02	1	69.24	2	124.78
2	Niina Petrõkina	Estonia	188.86	3	64.92	3	123.94
3	Ekaterina Kurakova	Poland	187.80	6	61.20	1	126.60
4	Nicole Schott	Germany	186.66	4	63.03	5	123.63
5	Lindsay Thorngren	United States	184.40	8	60.75	4	123.65
6	Anastasiia Shabotova	Ukraine	177.40	9	59.95	6	117.45
7	Gabrielle Daleman	Canada	176.74	5	61.57	7	115.17
8	Emmi Peltonen	Finland	169.25	7	60.79	9	108.46
9	Jenni Saarinen	Finland	164.85	2	68.71	16	96.14
10	Kristina Isaev	Germany	161.47	15	52.11	8	109.36
11	Natasha McKay	Great Britain	160.22	10	56.44	10	103.76
12	Marilena Kitromilis	Cyprus	157.12	12	54.77	12	102.35
13	Gabriella Izzo	United States	155.78	11	55.56	14	100.22
14	Emilea Zingas	Cyprus	152.17	17	50.30	13	101.87
15	Kristina Škuleta-Gromova	Estonia	149.80	19	47.28	11	102.52
16	Niki Wories	Netherlands	147.92	13	54.32	18	93.60
17	Alina Urushadze	Georgia	147.39	14	54.11	19	93.28
18	Taylor Morris	Israel	140.77	21	44.67	17	96.10
19	Anastasia Gozhva	Ukraine	139.53	24	42.95	15	96.58
20	Aleksandra Golovkina	Lithuania	135.23	20	45.41	20	89.82
21	Yelizaveta Babenko	Ukraine	131.51	18	48.35	21	83.16
22	Elżbieta Gabryszak	Poland	125.59	22	43.59	22	82.00
23	Karolina Białas	Poland	124.31	23	43.58	23	80.73
24	Nathalie Weinzierl	Germany	122.23	16	50.90	25	71.33
25	Nataly Langerbaur	Estonia	120.10	26	42.36	24	77.74
26	Natalia Lerka	Poland	112.06	28	41.20	26	70.86
27	Maia Sørensen	Denmark	106.51	27	42.06	27	64.45
28	Julie Froetscher	France	89.84	25	42.63	29	47.21
29	Maral-Erdene Gansukh	Mongolia	81.15	29	28.17	28	52.98
WD	Marina Asoyan	Armenia	withdrew	withdrew from competition			

=== Pairs ===
Rank	Name	Nation	Total points	SP		FS	
1	Evgenia Tarasova / Vladimir Morozov	Russia	228.49	1	79.76	1	148.73
2	Jessica Calalang / Brian Johnson	United States	196.85	7	61.69	2	135.16
3	Yasmina Kadyrova / Ivan Balchenko	Russia	192.94	3	67.53	3	125.41
4	Alina Pepeleva / Roman Pleshkov	Russia	190.93	2	69.42	5	121.51
5	Anastasiia Metelkina / Daniil Parkman	Georgia	184.24	4	62.70	4	121.54
6	Deanna Stellato-Dudek / Maxime Deschamps	Canada	172.73	11	57.88	6	114.85
7	Sara Conti / Niccolò Macii	Italy	168.04	9	59.68	7	108.36
8	Laura Barquero / Marco Zandron	Spain	167.34	6	62.41	10	104.93
9	Emily Chan / Spencer Akira Howe	United States	163.39	12	56.94	8	106.45
10	Lori-Ann Matte / Thierry Ferland	Canada	161.00	10	58.64	11	102.36
11	Ekaterina Yurova / Dmitry Bushlanov	Belarus	159.93	16	53.64	9	106.29
12	Elizaveta Zhuk / Martin Bidař	Czech Republic	157.13	8	60.88	12	96.25
13	Hailey Kops / Evgeni Krasnopolski	Israel	151.54	13	56.54	14	95.00
14	Letizia Roscher / Luis Schuster	Germany	150.73	15	54.78	13	95.95
15	Daria Danilova / Michel Tsiba	Netherlands	144.73	14	55.45	15	89.28
16	Dorota Broda / Pedro Betegón Martín	Spain	134.53	17	50.73	16	83.90
17	Anastasia Vaipan-Law / Luke Digby	Great Britain	121.35	18	43.10	17	78.25
18	Campbell Young / Lachlan Lewer	Australia	96.73	20	32.36	18	64.37
19	Océane Piegad / Rémi Belmonte	France	93.42	19	34.83	19	58.59
WD	Chelsea Liu / Danny O'Shea	United States	withdrew	5	62.55	withdrew from competition	

=== Ice dance ===
Rank	Name	Nation	Total points	RD		FD	
1	Diana Davis / Gleb Smolkin	Russia	199.90	1	81.30	1	118.60
2	Kana Muramoto / Daisuke Takahashi	Japan	190.16	2	75.87	2	114.29
3	Caroline Green / Michael Parsons	United States	187.84	3	75.35	3	112.49
4	Elizaveta Shanaeva / Devid Naryzhnyy	Russia	184.43	4	73.55	4	110.88
5	Yuka Orihara / Juho Pirinen	Finland	176.77	6	71.56	5	105.21
6	Natálie Taschlerová / Filip Taschler	Czech Republic	175.48	5	73.22	8	102.26
7	Eva Pate / Logan Bye	United States	171.00	9	67.39	6	103.61
8	Molly Lanaghan / Dmitre Razgulajevs	Canada	170.19	8	67.41	7	102.78
9	Maria Golubtsova / Kirill Belobrov	Ukraine	168.91	7	68.51	9	100.40
10	Natacha Lagouge / Arnaud Caffa	France	162.09	10	66.31	11	95.78
11	Mariia Nosovitskaya / Mikhail Nosovitskiy	Israel	159.40	13	61.13	10	98.27
12	Viktoria Semenjuk / Ilya Yukhimuk	Belarus	156.38	14	60.99	12	95.39
13	Anastasia Polibina / Pavel Golovishnikov	Poland	155.99	12	63.88	13	92.11
14	Jasmine Tessari / Stéphane Walker	Switzerland	154.87	11	66.06	15	88.81
15	Solène Mazingue / Marko Jevgeni Gaidajenko	Estonia	147.54	17	57.83	14	89.71
16	Anne-Marie Wolf / Max Liebers	Germany	139.56	20	51.19	16	88.37
17	Aleksandra Samersova / Kevin Ojala	Estonia	138.80	16	58.00	18	80.80
18	Lara Luft / Maximilian Pfisterer	Germany	133.64	15	59.48	20	74.16
19	Paulina Ramanauskaitė / Deividas Kizala	Lithuania	133.03	19	53.15	19	79.88
20	Viktoriia Lopusova / Asaf Kazimov	Germany	131.67	21	47.46	17	84.21
21	Hanna Jakucs / Alessio Galli	Netherlands	127.12	18	53.51	21	73.61
22	Olexandra Borysova / Aaron Freeman	Poland	102.15	22	41.42	22	60.73
