= Romain Haguenauer =

French ice dancing coach

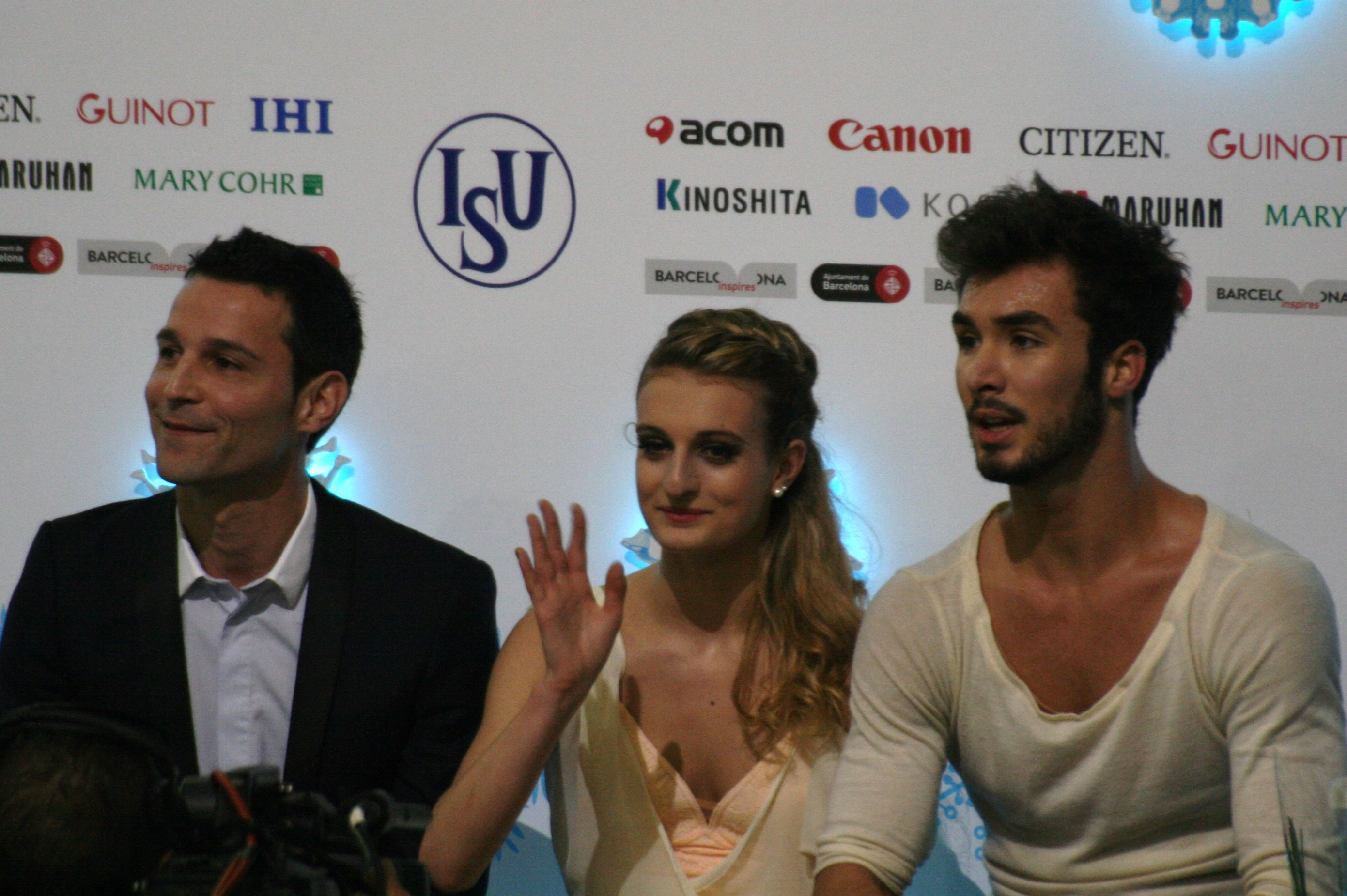
- Romain Haguenauer in 2014

Personal information
- Born: 16 July 1976 (age 50) Lyon, France

Figure skating career
- Country: France
- Retired: 1997

Romain Haguenauer (born 16 July 1976) is a French ice dancing coach, choreographer, and former competitor. He is best known for his work with the French five-time World and 2022 Olympic champions Gabriella Papadakis and Guillaume Cizeron; and with Canadian three-time World champions and two-time Olympic champions Tessa Virtue and Scott Moir. He has also coached the top-ranking American teams of Madison Hubbell and Zachary Donohue, and Madison Chock and Evan Bates.

== Personal life ==
Haguenauer was born on 16 July 1976 in Lyon, France. His mother, an elementary school teacher, and father, a lawyer, raised him in Ainay. After graduating in 1998 from Claude Bernard University Lyon 1 with a degree in sports and physical education (Capes d'éducation physique et sportive), he taught for a year at a secondary school, collège Jean-Monnet.

In 2017, Haguenauer married Jamal Othman, a former Swiss figure skater. Their son, Noam Camille Othman Haguenauer, was born in November 2022.

== Competitive career ==
Haguenauer was coached from the age of five by Muriel Boucher-Zazoui and competed with his sister, Marianne Haguenauer, for ten years. They placed eighth at the 1995 World Junior Championships in November 1994 in Budapest and won gold at the 1995 Ondrej Nepela Memorial. Due to his sister's health issues, he retired from competition at age 20. He had no regrets, as he had a strong interest in coaching.

=== Results with Marianne Haguenauer ===
GP: Champions Series (Grand Prix)

International
Event	92–93	93–94	94–95	95–96	96–97
GP Trophée de France				8th	
Karl Schäfer Memorial				4th	
Ondrej Nepela Memorial				1st	
PFSA Trophy					3rd
Skate Israel				WD	
International: Junior
World Junior Champ.			8th		
Blue Swords			3rd J		
PFSA Trophy	3rd J				
Ukrainian Souvenir	3rd J				
National
French Championships					6th
J = Junior level; WD = Withdrew

== Post-competitive career ==
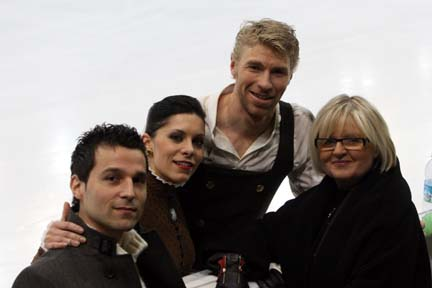
Haguenauer and Boucher-Zazoui with Isabelle Delobel and Olivier Schoenfelder in 2007

Haguenauer worked as a part-time skating coach before becoming a certified coach in 1999. He has also served as a technical executive for the Pôle de Lyon. He has co-authored a children's book about skating, Le p'tit ABC du patinage, with Alexandre Navarro.

Haguenauer was formerly based in Lyon, France, working as a coach and choreographer in collaboration with Zazoui. In July 2014, he moved to Montreal, Quebec, Canada and began coaching alongside Marie-France Dubreuil and Patrice Lauzon, at Ice Academy of Montreal.

His current students include:

- (United States) Madison Chock / Evan Bates (2022 & 2026 Olympic gold medalists (team event), 2026 Olympic silver medalists, three-time World champions, three-time Four Continents champions, seven-time US champions
- (Georgia (country)) Diana Davis / Gleb Smolkin
- (Canada) Alicia Fabbri / Marko Jevgeni Gaidajenko
- (United Kingdom) Lilah Fear / Lewis Gibson (European silver medalists, five-time British champions)
- (France) Laurence Fournier Beaudry / Guillaume Cizeron (2026 Olympic gold medalists)
- (Canada) Jamie Fournier / Everest Zhu
- (Canada) Sandrine Gauthier / Paul Ayer
- (Australia) Holly Harris / Jason Chan
- (Japan) Rika Kihira / Shingo Nishiyama
- (Canada) Marjorie Lajoie / Jean-Luc Baker
- (Canada) (France) Marie-Jade Lauriault / Romain Le Gac
- (Canada) Hannah Lim / Zachary Lagha
- (France) Evgeniia Lopareva / Geoffrey Brissaud
- (United States) Vanessa Pham / Anton Spiridonov
- (Lithuania) Allison Reed / Saulius Ambrulevičius
- (China) Shiyue Wang / Xinyu Liu
- (Spain) Olivia Smart / Tim Dieck

His former students include:

- (Canada) Emmy Bronsard / Aissa Bouaraguia
- (France) Pernelle Carron / Lloyd Jones
- (France) Pernelle Carron / Matthieu Jost
- (China) Chen Hong / Sun Zhuoming
- (France) Isabelle Delobel / Olivier Schoenfelder
- (Canada) Alicia Fabbri / Paul Ayer
- (Canada) Marie-France Dubreuil / Patrice Lauzon
- (United Kingdom) Sasha Fear / George Waddell
- (Canada) Ellie Fisher / Simon-Pierre Malette-Paquette
- (Canada) (Denmark) Laurence Fournier Beaudry / Nikolaj Sørensen
- (Japan) Rikako Fukase / Aru Tateno
- (Japan) Rikako Fukase / Oliver Zhang
- (Armenia) Tina Garabedian / Simon Proulx-Sénécal
- (Canada) Sandrine Gauthier / Quentin Thieren
- (United States) Kaitlin Hawayek / Jean-Luc Baker (Four Continents champions)
- (Ukraine) Mariia Holubtsova / Kyryl Bielobrov
- (United States) Madison Hubbell / Zachary Donohue(2022 Olympic champions (team event), 2022 Olympic bronze medalists, Four Continents champions, Grand Prix Final champions, US Ccampions)
- (Spain) Sara Hurtado / Adrián Díaz
- (Japan) Sara Kishimoto / Atsuhito Tamura
- (Japan) Misato Komatsubara / Tim Koleto (2022 Olympic silver medalists (team event))
- (South Korea) Lee Ho-jung / Richard Kang-in Kam
- (Canada) Marjorie Lajoie / Zachary Lagha (World Junior champions)
- (South Korea) Hannah Lim / Ye Quan
- (Bulgaria) Teodora Markova / Simon Daze
- (Estonia) Solène Mazingue / Marko Jevgeni Gaidajenko
- (France) Gabriella Papadakis / Guillaume Cizeron (2022 Olympic gold medalists, 2018 Olympic silver medalists, five-time European champions, five-time World Champions, three-time French champions)
- (Canada) Élisabeth Paradis / François-Xavier Ouellette
- (Canada) Alexandra Paul / Mitchell Islam
- (France) Nathalie Péchalat / Fabian Bourzat
- (Poland) Justyna Plutowska / Jérémie Flemin
- (Spain) Celia Robledo / Luis Fenero
- (Spain) Olivia Smart / Adrián Díaz
- (Canada) Carolane Soucisse / Shane Firus
- (Japan) Azusa Tanaka / Shingo Nishiyama
- (Canada) Tessa Virtue / Scott Moir (Three-time Olympic gold medalists, two-time Olympic silver medalists, three-time World champions, Grand Prix Final champions, three-time Four Continents champions, World Junior champions, Junior Grand Prix Final champions, eight-time Canadian champions, only ice dancers to achieve career Grand Slam)
- (United Kingdom) Louise Walden / Owen Edwards
- (France) Tiffany Zahorski / Alexis Miart

Haguenauer has also choreographed programs for singles skaters, such as Alban Préaubert, Sonia Lafuente, and Donovan Carrillo.
