= 2024 World Figure Skating Championships =

International figure skating competition

- Type: ISU Championship
- Date: 18 – 24 March
- Season: 2023–24
- Location: Montreal, Quebec, Canada
- Host: Skate Canada
- Venue: Bell Centre

Champions
- Men's singles: (United States) Ilia Malinin
- Women's singles: (Japan) Kaori Sakamoto
- Pairs: (Canada) Deanna Stellato-Dudek and Maxime Deschamps
- Ice dance: (United States) Madison Chock and Evan Bates
- Previous: 2023 World Championships
- Next: 2025 World Championships

The 2024 World Figure Skating Championships were held from 18 to 24 March at the Bell Centre in Montreal, Canada. Sanctioned by the International Skating Union (ISU), the World Championships are considered the most prestigious event in figure skating. Medals were awarded in men's singles, women's singles, pair skating, and ice dance. The competition determined the entry quotas for each skating federation to the 2025 World Championships. Ilia Malinin of the United States won the men's event, Kaori Sakamoto of Japan won the women's event, Deanna Stellato-Dudek and Maxime Deschamps of Canada won the pairs event, and Madison Chock and Evan Bates of the United States won the ice dance event. At age 40, Stellato-Dudek became the oldest woman to win a gold medal at the World Championships.

== Background ==
The World Figure Skating Championships are considered the most prestigious event in figure skating. The 2024 World Championships were held from 18 to 24 March at the Bell Centre in Montreal, Canada. Montreal had originally been scheduled to host the 2020 World Championships, which were cancelled due to the COVID-19 pandemic.

== Qualification ==
The number of entries from each nation for the 2024 World Championships was based on the results of the 2023 World Championships. These nations were eligible to enter more than one skater or team in the indicated disciplines. Skaters from Russia and Belarus were banned from participating "until further notice" due to the 2022 Russian invasion of Ukraine.

Number of entries per discipline
Spots	Men	Women	Pairs	Ice dance
3	Japan; South Korea; United States	Japan; South Korea	Canada; United States	Canada; United States
2	Canada; France; Italy; Switzerland	Belgium; Estonia; Germany; Switzerland; United States	Australia; Germany; Hungary; Italy	Czech Republic; Finland; France; Great Britain; Italy; Lithuania

== Changes to preliminary entries ==
The International Skating Union published the initial list of entrants on 27 February 2024.

Changes to preliminary entries
Date	Discipline	Withdrew	Added	Reason	Ref.
19 January	Men	(France); Kévin Aymoz	(France); Luc Economides	Aymoz withdrew from competition for the remainder of season.	
26 February	Women	(France); Léa Serna	(France); Lorine Schild	—N/a	
28 February	Pairs	(France); Camille Kovalev; Pavel Kovalev	—N/a	Injury	
11 March	Ice dance	(China); Wang Shiyue; Liu Xinyu	(China); Chen Xizi; Xing Jianing	—N/a	

== Required performance elements ==
=== Single skating ===
Women competing in single skating first performed their short programs on 20 March, while men performed theirs on 21 March. Lasting 2 minutes 40 seconds (+/− 10 seconds), the short program had to include the following elements:

For men: one double or triple Axel; one triple or quadruple jump; one jump combination consisting of a double jump and a triple jump, two triple jumps, or a quadruple jump and a double jump or triple jump; one flying spin; one camel spin or sit spin with a change of foot; one spin combination with a change of foot; and a step sequence using the full ice surface.

For women: one double or triple Axel; one triple jump; one jump combination consisting of a double jump and a triple jump, or two triple jumps; one flying spin; one layback spin, sideways leaning spin, camel spin, or sit spin without a change of foot; one spin combination with a change of foot; and one step sequence using the full ice surface.

The top 24 skaters after completion of their short programs moved on to the free skate. Women performed their free skates on 22 March, while men performed theirs on 23 March. Lasting 4 minutes (+/− 10 seconds), the free skate for both men and women had to include the following: seven jump elements, of which one had to be an Axel-type jump; three spins, of which one had to be a spin combination, one a flying spin, and one a spin with only one position; a step sequence; and a choreographic sequence.

=== Pair skating ===
Couples competing in pair skating also first performed their short programs on 20 March. Lasting 2 minutes 40 seconds (+/− 10 seconds), the short program had to include the following elements: one pair lift, one double or triple twist lift, one double or triple throw jump, one double or triple solo jump, one solo spin combination with a change of foot, one death spiral, and a step sequence using the full ice surface.

The top 20 couples after completion of their short programs moved on to the free skate, which was performed on 21 March. Lasting 4 minutes (+/− 10 seconds), the free skate had to include the following: three pair lifts, one twist lift, two different throw jumps, one solo jump, one jump combination or sequence, one pair spin combination, one death spiral, and a choreographic sequence.

=== Ice dance ===
Couples competing in ice dance performed their rhythm dances on 22 March. Lasting 2 minutes 50 seconds (+/− 10 seconds), the theme of the rhythm dance this season was "music and feeling of the eighties". Teams could select any music provided "it was originally released in the decade of the 1980s" and maintained "the essence of the 1980s". The rhythm dance had to include the following elements: one pattern dance step sequence, one choreographic rhythm sequence, one short dance lift, one set of sequential twizzles, and one step sequence while not touching.

The top 20 couples after the rhythm dance moved on to the free dance, which was held on 23 March. Lasting 4 minutes (+/− 10 seconds), the free dance had to include the following: three short dance lifts or one short dance lift and one combination lift, one dance spin, one set of synchronized twizzles, one step sequence in hold, one turns sequence while on one skate and not touching, and three different choreographic elements.

== Judging ==
Skaters were judged according to the required technical elements of their program (such as jumps and spins), as well as the overall presentation of their program, based on three program components (skating skills, presentation, and composition). Each technical element in a figure skating performance was assigned a predetermined base point value and scored by a panel of nine judges on a scale from −5 to +5 based on the quality of its execution. Each Grade of Execution (GOE) from −5 to +5 was assigned a value as indicated on the Scale of Values. For example, a triple Axel was worth a base value of 8.00 points, and a GOE of +5 was worth 2.40 points, so a triple Axel with a GOE of +5 earned 10.40 points. The judging panel's GOE for each element was determined by calculating the trimmed mean (the average after discarding the highest and lowest scores). The panel's scores for all elements were added together to generate a Total Elements Score. At the same time, the judges evaluated each performance based on the three aforementioned program components and assigned each a score from 0.25 to 10 in 0.25-point increments. The judging panel's final score for each program component was also determined by calculating the trimmed mean. Those scores were then multiplied by the factor shown on the chart below; the results were added together to generate a total Program Component Score.

Program component factoring
Discipline	Short program or Rhythm dance	Free skate or Free dance
Men	1.67	3.33
Women	1.33	2.67
Pairs	1.33	2.67
Ice dance	1.33	2.00

Deductions were applied for certain violations, such as time infractions or falls. The Total Elements Score and Program Component Score were then added together, minus any deductions, to generate a final performance score for each skater or team.

== Medal summary ==
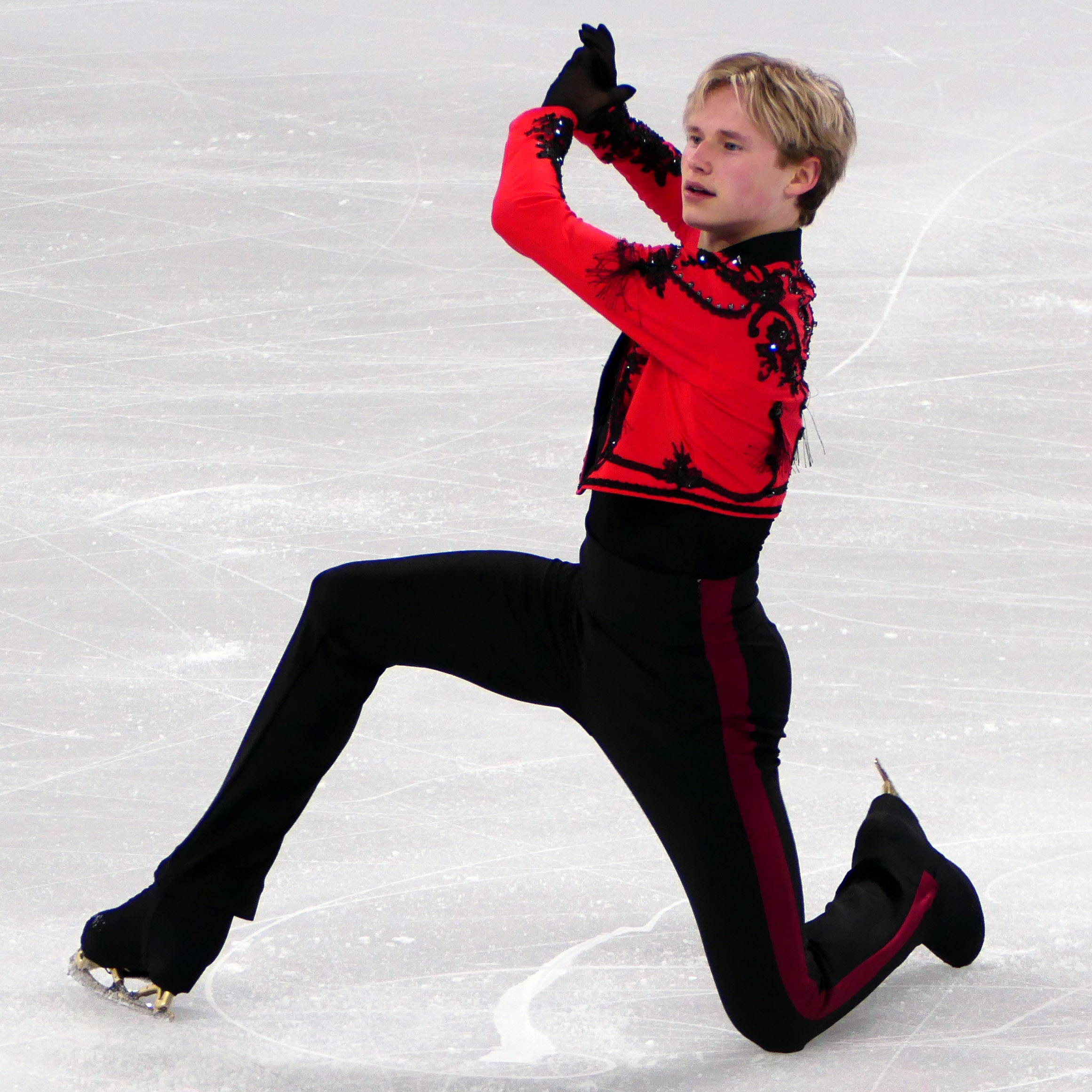
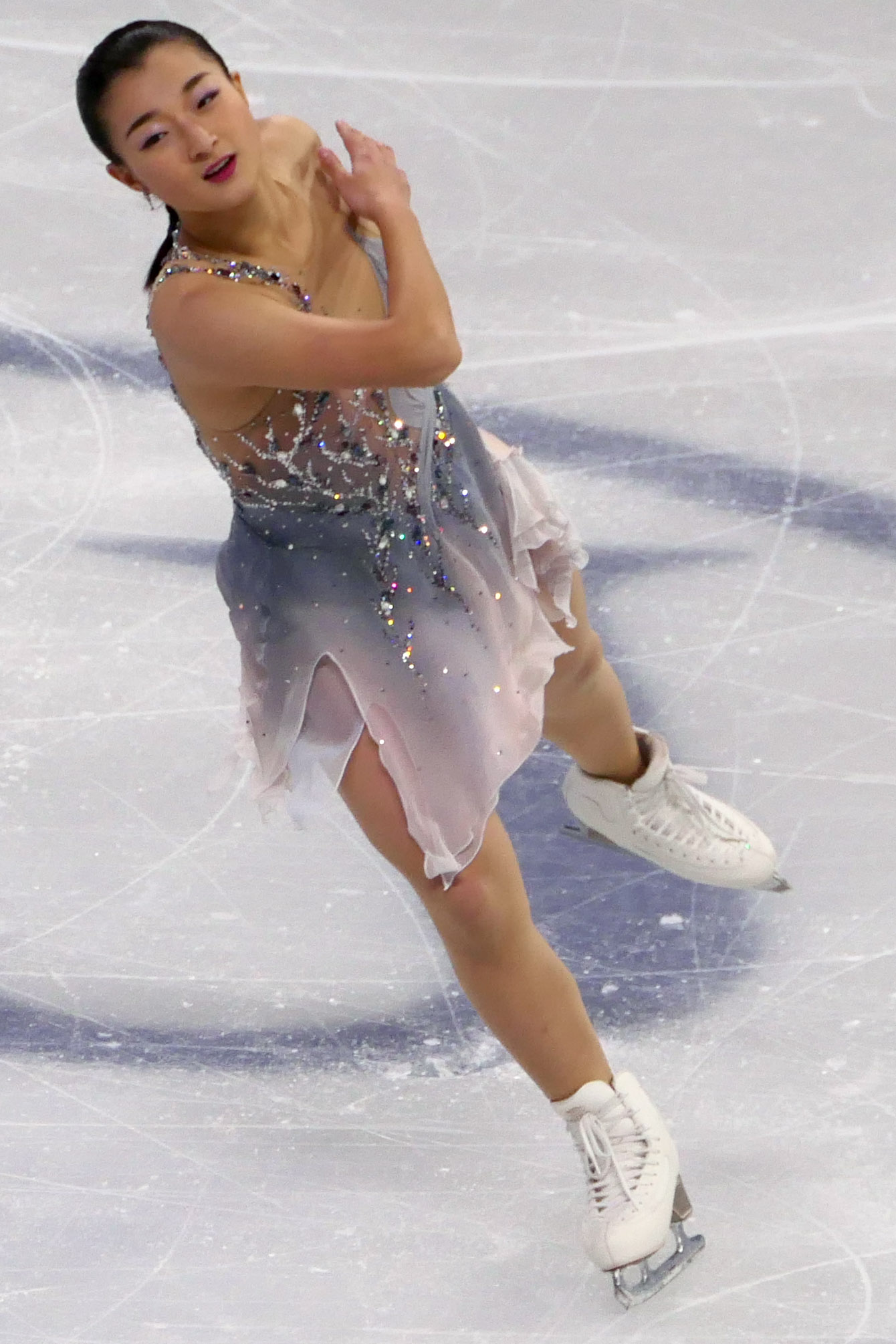
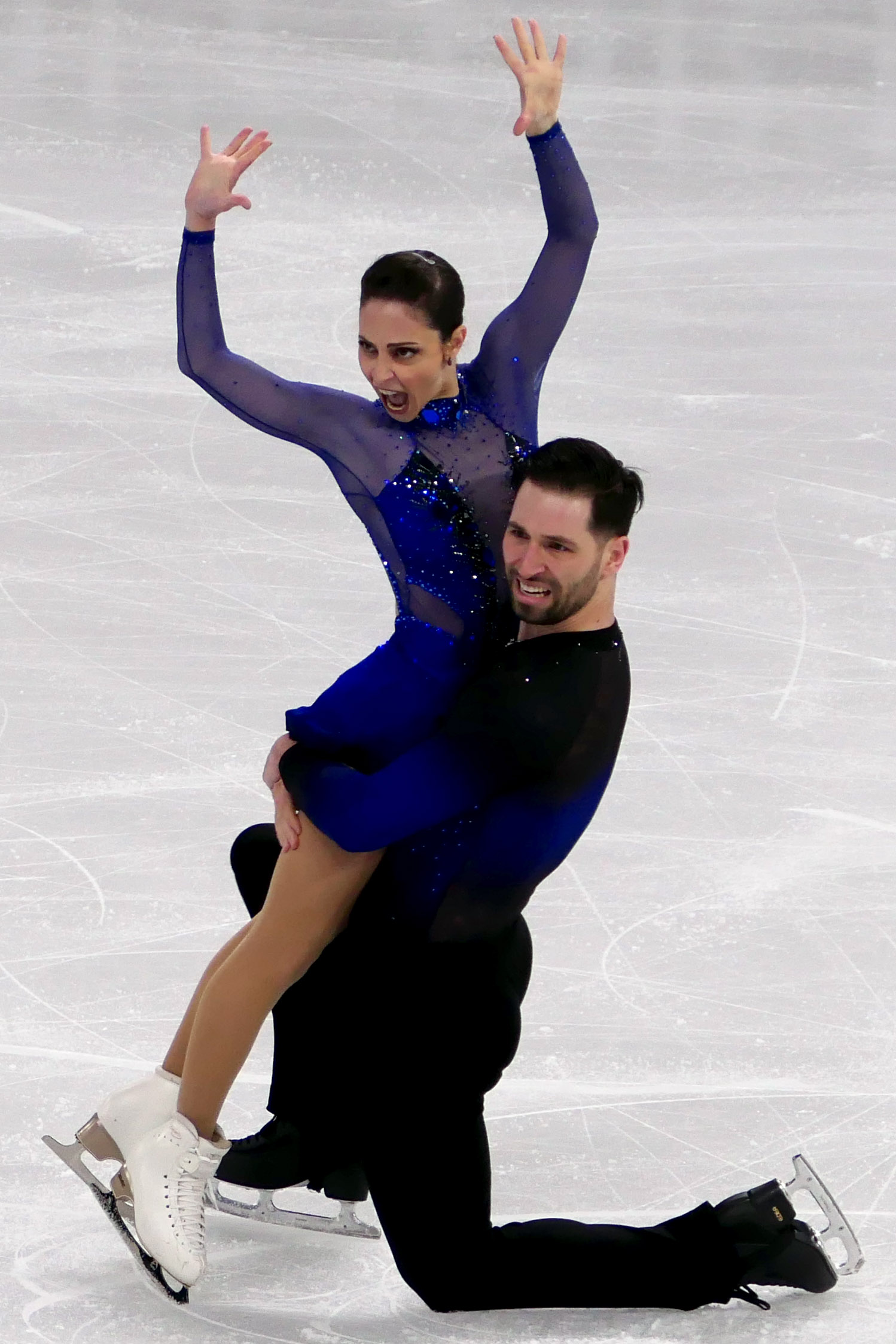
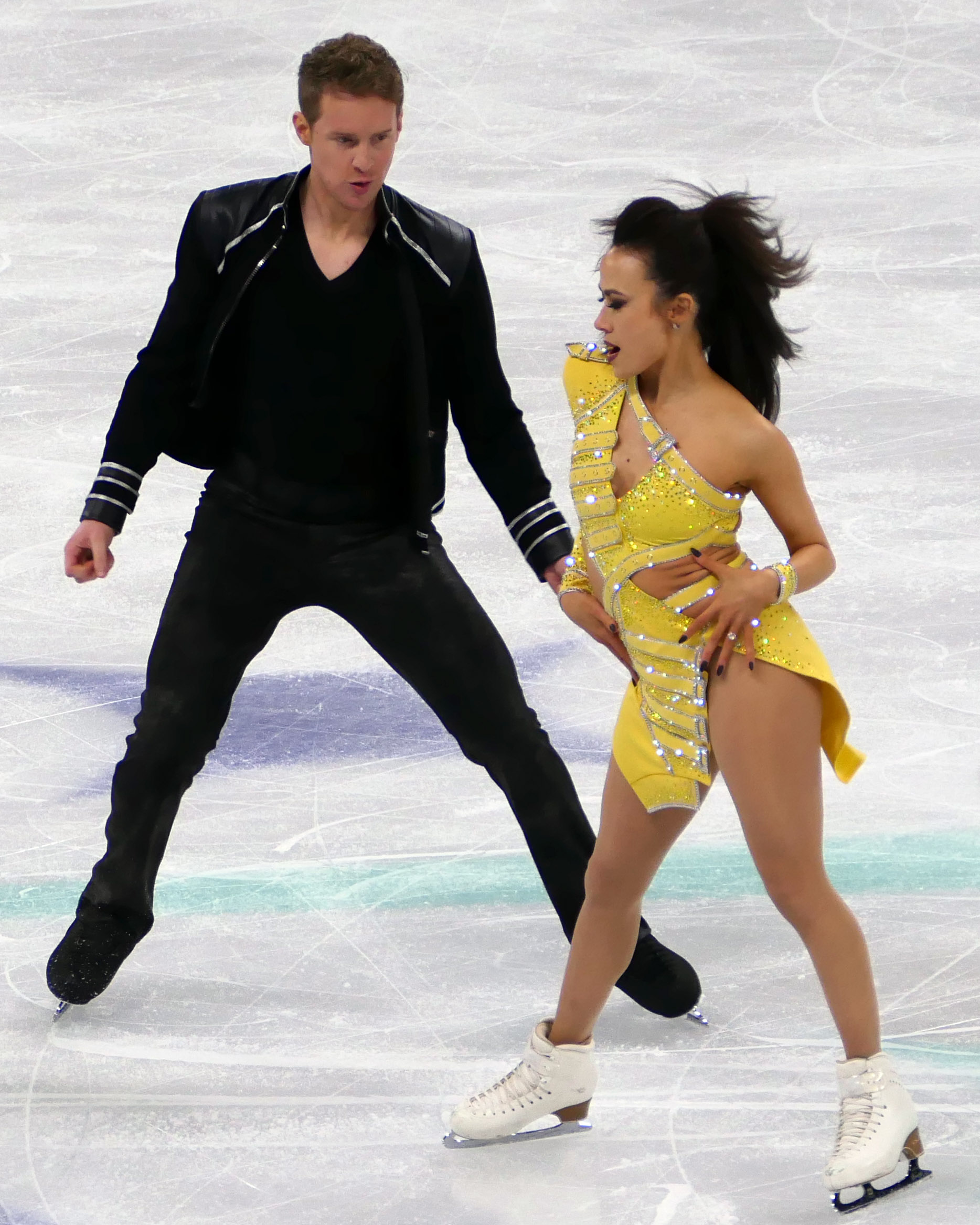
The 2024 World Champions (from left to right): Ilia Malinin of the United States (men's singles); Kaori Sakamoto of Japan (women's singles); Deanna Stellato-Dudek and Maxime Deschamps of Canada (pair skating); and Madison Chock and Evan Bates of the United States (ice dance)

=== Medalists ===
Medals were awarded to the skaters or teams who achieved the highest overall placements in each discipline.

Medal recipients
Discipline	Gold	Silver	Bronze
Men	(United States); Ilia Malinin	(Japan); Yuma Kagiyama	(France); Adam Siao Him Fa
Women	(Japan); Kaori Sakamoto	(United States); Isabeau Levito	(South Korea); Kim Chae-yeon
Pairs	(Canada); Deanna Stellato-Dudek; Maxime Deschamps	(Japan); Riku Miura; Ryuichi Kihara	(Germany); Minerva Fabienne Hase; Nikita Volodin
Ice dance	(United States); Madison Chock; Evan Bates	(Canada); Piper Gilles; Paul Poirier	(Italy); Charlène Guignard; Marco Fabbri

Small medals were awarded to the skaters or teams who achieved the highest short program or rhythm dance placements in each discipline.

Small medal recipients for highest short program or rhythm dance
Discipline	Gold	Silver	Bronze
Men	(Japan); Shoma Uno	(Japan); Yuma Kagiyama	(United States); Ilia Malinin
Women	(Belgium); Loena Hendrickx	(United States); Isabeau Levito	(South Korea); Lee Hae-in
Pairs	(Canada); Deanna Stellato-Dudek; Maxime Deschamps	(Japan); Riku Miura; Ryuichi Kihara	(Italy); Sara Conti; Niccolò Macii
Ice dance	(United States); Madison Chock; Evan Bates	(Italy); Charlène Guignard; Marco Fabbri	(Canada); Piper Gilles; Paul Poirier

Small medals were awarded to the skaters or teams who achieved the highest free skate or free dance placements in each discipline.

Small medal recipients for highest free skate or free dance
Discipline	Gold	Silver	Bronze
Men	(United States); Ilia Malinin	(France); Adam Siao Him Fa	(Japan); Yuma Kagiyama
Women	(Japan); Kaori Sakamoto	(United States); Isabeau Levito	(South Korea); Kim Chae-yeon
Pairs	(Japan); Riku Miura; Ryuichi Kihara	(Canada); Deanna Stellato-Dudek; Maxime Deschamps	(Germany); Minerva Fabienne Hase; Nikita Volodin
Ice dance	(Canada); Piper Gilles; Paul Poirier	(United States); Madison Chock; Evan Bates	(Italy); Charlène Guignard; Marco Fabbri

=== Medals by country ===
Rank	Nation	Gold	Silver	Bronze	Total
1	United States	2	1	0	3
2	Japan	1	2	0	3
3	Canada	1	1	0	2
4	France	0	0	1	1
4	Germany	0	0	1	1
4	Italy	0	0	1	1
4	South Korea	0	0	1	1
Totals (7 entries)		4	4	4	12

== Results ==
=== Men's singles ===
After a disastrous short program, where he finished in nineteenth place, Adam Siao Him Fa of France rallied back in the free skate with a performance that included four successful quadruple jumps, ultimately finishing second in the free skate and third overall. This was the largest comeback in the history of the World Championships. Meanwhile, Ilia Malinin of the United States set a new record for the highest score in the free skate. His score of 227.79 beat the previous record held by Nathan Chen, also of the United States. Malinin's free skate included six quadruple jumps, including his signature quadruple Axel.

Men's results
Rank	Skater	Nation	Total	SP		FS	
1st place, gold medalist(s)	Ilia Malinin	United States	333.76	3	105.97	1	227.79
2nd place, silver medalist(s)	Yuma Kagiyama	Japan	309.65	2	106.35	3	203.30
3rd place, bronze medalist(s)	Adam Siao Him Fa	France	284.39	19	77.49	2	206.90
4	Shoma Uno	Japan	280.85	1	107.72	6	173.13
5	Jason Brown	United States	274.33	4	93.87	5	180.46
6	Lukas Britschgi	Switzerland	274.09	5	93.41	4	180.68
7	Deniss Vasiļjevs	Latvia	257.80	8	89.42	8	168.38
8	Kao Miura	Japan	254.72	10	85.00	7	169.72
9	Nikolaj Memola	Italy	253.12	6	93.10	12	160.02
10	Cha Jun-hwan	South Korea	249.65	9	88.21	11	161.44
11	Aleksandr Selevko	Estonia	247.57	12	84.08	9	163.49
12	Mark Gorodnitsky	Israel	243.25	14	80.49	10	162.76
13	Nika Egadze	Georgia	241.55	7	92.08	15	149.47
14	Mikhail Shaidorov	Kazakhstan	234.19	16	80.02	13	154.17
15	Donovan Carrillo	Mexico	232.67	15	80.19	14	152.48
16	Gabriele Frangipani	Italy	231.38	13	82.63	17	148.75
17	Wesley Chiu	Canada	227.21	18	78.00	16	149.21
18	Kim Hyun-gyeom	South Korea	222.79	21	74.89	18	147.90
19	Roman Sadovsky	Canada	221.57	11	84.28	22	137.29
20	Camden Pulkinen	United States	219.86	17	78.85	20	141.01
21	Luc Economides	France	217.10	22	74.02	19	143.08
22	Semen Daniliants	Armenia	213.99	23	73.46	21	140.53
23	Andreas Nordebäck	Sweden	211.45	20	76.20	23	135.25
24	Lee Si-hyeong	South Korea	207.59	24	73.23	24	134.36
25	Vladimir Litvintsev	Azerbaijan	72.16	25	72.16	Did not advance to free skate	
26	Davide Lewton Brain	Monaco	71.58	26	71.58	Did not advance to free skate	
27	Maurizio Zandron	Austria	69.59	27	69.59	Did not advance to free skate	
28	Tomàs-Llorenç Guarino Sabaté	Spain	68.35	28	68.35	Did not advance to free skate	
29	Jari Kessler	Croatia	68.32	29	68.32	Did not advance to free skate	
30	Burak Demirboğa	Turkey	68.18	30	68.18	Did not advance to free skate	
31	Vladimir Samoilov	Poland	67.81	31	67.81	Did not advance to free skate	
32	Nikita Starostin	Germany	67.34	32	67.34	Did not advance to free skate	
33	Ivan Shmuratko	Ukraine	66.90	33	66.90	Did not advance to free skate	
34	Valtter Virtanen	Finland	66.55	34	66.55	Did not advance to free skate	
35	Adam Hagara	Slovakia	65.37	35	65.37	Did not advance to free skate	
36	Georgii Reshtenko	Czech Republic	65.35	36	65.35	Did not advance to free skate	
37	Alexander Zlatkov	Bulgaria	64.77	37	64.77	Did not advance to free skate	
38	Edward Appleby	Great Britain	59.51	38	59.51	Did not advance to free skate	
39	Jin Boyang	China	58.53	39	58.53	Did not advance to free skate	
40	Aleksandr Vlasenko	Hungary	51.50	40	51.50	Did not advance to free skate	

=== Women's singles ===
Women's results
Rank	Skater	Nation	Total	SP		FS	
1st place, gold medalist(s)	Kaori Sakamoto	Japan	222.96	4	73.29	1	149.67
2nd place, silver medalist(s)	Isabeau Levito	United States	212.16	2	73.73	2	138.43
3rd place, bronze medalist(s)	Kim Chae-yeon	South Korea	203.59	6	66.91	3	136.68
4	Loena Hendrickx	Belgium	200.25	1	76.98	8	123.27
5	Kimmy Repond	Switzerland	196.02	12	62.64	4	133.38
6	Lee Hae-in	South Korea	195.48	3	73.55	12	121.93
7	Mone Chiba	Japan	195.46	13	62.64	5	132.82
8	Hana Yoshida	Japan	194.93	8	64.56	6	130.37
9	Livia Kaiser	Switzerland	187.24	10	64.05	9	123.19
10	Amber Glenn	United States	186.53	9	64.53	11	122.00
11	Ekaterina Kurakova	Poland	184.76	14	62.34	10	122.42
12	You Young	South Korea	183.35	5	67.37	14	115.98
13	Anastasiia Gubanova	Georgia	182.42	20	58.66	7	123.76
14	Olga Mikutina	Austria	177.76	16	60.77	13	116.99
15	Nina Pinzarrone	Belgium	177.46	11	64.04	16	113.42
16	Niina Petrõkina	Estonia	176.53	7	66.23	18	110.30
17	Lorine Schild	France	172.90	18	59.41	15	113.49
18	Madeline Schizas	Canada	171.78	17	59.65	17	112.13
19	Josefin Taljegård	Sweden	167.47	15	61.55	20	105.92
20	Sarina Joos	Italy	167.04	19	59.39	19	107.65
21	Nataly Langerbaur	Estonia	159.55	24	53.81	21	105.74
22	Ting Tzu-Han	Chinese Taipei	157.83	22	56.32	22	101.51
23	Mia Risa Gomez	Norway	147.13	23	55.09	23	92.04
24	Nella Pelkonen	Finland	145.45	21	56.82	24	88.63
25	Nina Povey	Great Britain	53.50	25	53.50	Did not advance to free skate	
26	Alexandra Feigin	Bulgaria	53.33	26	53.33	Did not advance to free skate	
27	Julia Sauter	Romania	52.52	27	52.52	Did not advance to free skate	
28	Eliška Březinová	Czech Republic	50.90	28	50.90	Did not advance to free skate	
29	Kristina Isaev	Germany	50.07	29	50.07	Did not advance to free skate	
30	Vanesa Šelmeková	Slovakia	48.94	30	48.94	Did not advance to free skate	
31	Sofja Stepčenko	Latvia	46.74	31	46.74	Did not advance to free skate	
32	Mariia Seniuk	Israel	46.57	32	46.57	Did not advance to free skate	
33	Anastasia Gracheva	Moldova	46.12	33	46.12	Did not advance to free skate	
34	Anastasia Gozhva	Ukraine	40.28	34	40.28	Did not advance to free skate	
35	Meda Variakojytė	Lithuania	40.04	35	40.04	Did not advance to free skate	

=== Pairs ===
At age 40, Deanna Stellato-Dudek of Canada became the oldest woman to win a gold medal at the World Championships. She had competed in single skating as a teenager, winning a gold medal at the 1999 Junior Grand Prix Final and a silver medal at the 2000 World Junior Championships, before retiring in 2001 due to injury. She returned to skating as a pair skater in 2016, first with Nathan Bartholomay and competing for the United States, and then with Maxime Deschamps and competing for Canada. When speaking about her record-setting accomplishment, Stellato-Dudek stated that "it is something I take with huge pride. I hope others can be inspired to stay around a lot longer, not only in sport, but also in other aspects of life.”

Pairs' results
Rank	Team	Nation	Total	SP		FS	
1st place, gold medalist(s)	Deanna Stellato-Dudek; Maxime Deschamps	Canada	221.56	1	77.48	2	144.08
2nd place, silver medalist(s)	Riku Miura; Ryuichi Kihara	Japan	217.88	2	73.53	1	144.35
3rd place, bronze medalist(s)	Minerva Fabienne Hase; Nikita Volodin	Germany	210.40	4	72.10	3	138.30
4	Maria Pavlova; Alexei Sviatchenko	Hungary	204.60	6	68.01	4	136.59
5	Annika Hocke; Robert Kunkel	Germany	198.23	7	67.64	5	130.59
6	Sara Conti; Niccolò Macii	Italy	197.34	3	72.88	6	124.46
7	Anastasiia Metelkina; Luka Berulava	Georgia	189.30	5	72.02	10	117.28
8	Lia Pereira; Trennt Michaud	Canada	186.93	9	64.83	7	122.10
9	Lucrezia Beccari; Matteo Guarise	Italy	185.40	8	66.12	9	119.28
10	Anastasia Golubeva; Hektor Giotopoulos Moore	Australia	182.71	11	63.35	8	119.36
11	Ellie Kam; Danny O'Shea	United States	180.41	10	64.44	11	115.97
12	Emily Chan; Spencer Akira Howe	United States	175.44	12	62.86	13	112.58
13	Valentina Plazas; Maximiliano Fernandez	United States	174.15	13	61.64	14	112.51
14	Daria Danilova; Michel Tsiba	Netherlands	172.24	17	59.07	12	113.17
15	Kelly Ann Laurin; Loucas Éthier	Canada	169.48	14	60.18	15	109.30
16	Peng Cheng; Wang Lei	China	165.67	15	59.50	16	106.17
17	Sofiia Holichenko; Artem Darenskyi	Ukraine	159.39	16	59.34	18	100.05
18	Milania Väänänen; Filippo Clerici	Finland	156.02	19	55.40	17	100.62
19	Ioulia Chtchetinina; Michał Woźniak	Poland	155.91	18	56.24	19	99.67
20	Anastasia Vaipan-Law; Luke Digby	Great Britain	153.06	20	54.69	20	98.37
21	Isabella Gamez; Alexander Korovin	Philippines	49.70	21	49.70	Did not advance to free skate	
22	Sophia Schaller; Livio Mayr	Austria	49.54	22	49.54	Did not advance to free skate	
23	Greta Crafoord; John Crafoord	Sweden	49.05	23	49.05	Did not advance to free skate	
24	Federica Simioli; Alessandro Zarbo	Czech Republic	46.84	24	46.84	Did not advance to free skate	

=== Ice dance ===
Madison Chock and Evan Bates of the United States won the ice dance competition with a new season-best total score, becoming the most decorated American ice dance team in the history of the World Championships with a total of five medals. Piper Gilles and Paul Poirier of Canada finished in second place, despite receiving the highest score in the free dance. "I haven't really fully digested it yet," Gilles said afterward. "It still feels like we haven't done it, to be able to just stand there at the end and just embrace all of our friends and family that were here to experience that moment with us was just something we can only dream of." Gilles and Poirier had been in third place after the rhythm dance, but their high score in the free dance allowed them to win the silver. Charlène Guignard and Marco Fabbri of Italy finished in third place.

Ice dance results
Rank	Team	Nation	Total	RD		FD	
1st place, gold medalist(s)	Madison Chock; Evan Bates	United States	222.20	1	90.08	2	132.12
2nd place, silver medalist(s)	Piper Gilles; Paul Poirier	Canada	219.68	3	86.51	1	133.17
3rd place, bronze medalist(s)	Charlène Guignard; Marco Fabbri	Italy	216.52	2	87.52	3	129.00
4	Lilah Fear; Lewis Gibson	Great Britain	210.92	4	84.60	4	126.32
5	Marjorie Lajoie; Zachary Lagha	Canada	208.01	5	82.30	5	125.71
6	Allison Reed; Saulius Ambrulevičius	Lithuania	200.96	6	80.99	9	119.97
7	Christina Carreira; Anthony Ponomarenko	United States	200.32	8	79.26	7	121.06
8	Evgenia Lopareva; Geoffrey Brissaud	France	200.28	7	80.01	8	120.27
9	Laurence Fournier Beaudry; Nikolaj Sørensen	Canada	199.91	10	75.79	6	124.12
10	Juulia Turkkila; Matthias Versluis	Finland	192.34	9	75.89	10	116.45
11	Loïcia Demougeot; Théo le Mercier	France	190.00	11	75.74	13	114.26
12	Diana Davis; Gleb Smolkin	Georgia	188.34	12	74.46	14	113.88
13	Kateřina Mrázková; Daniel Mrázek	Czech Republic	188.28	13	73.05	11	115.23
14	Hannah Lim; Ye Quan	South Korea	186.51	14	71.89	12	114.62
15	Natálie Taschlerová; Filip Taschler	Czech Republic	180.17	18	68.25	15	111.92
16	Yuka Orihara; Juho Pirinen	Finland	175.99	17	68.66	16	107.33
17	Holly Harris; Jason Chan	Australia	174.78	16	71.44	19	103.34
18	Misato Komatsubara; Tim Koleto	Japan	173.90	20	66.92	17	106.98
19	Olivia Smart; Tim Dieck	Spain	173.53	15	71.81	20	101.72
20	Carolane Soucisse; Shane Firus	Ireland	171.67	19	68.04	18	103.63
21	Phebe Bekker; James Hernandez	Great Britain	66.39	21	66.39	Did not advance to free dance	
22	Jennifer Janse van Rensburg; Benjamin Steffan	Germany	65.86	22	65.86	Did not advance to free dance	
23	Emily Bratti; Ian Somerville	United States	65.21	23	65.21	Did not advance to free dance	
24	Mariia Ignateva; Danijil Leonyidovics Szemko	Hungary	64.59	24	64.59	Did not advance to free dance	
25	Victoria Manni; Carlo Röthlisberger	Italy	63.64	25	63.64	Did not advance to free dance	
26	Mariia Holubtsova; Kyryl Bielobrov	Ukraine	63.30	26	63.30	Did not advance to free dance	
27	Anna Šimová; Kiril Aksenov	Slovakia	62.76	27	62.76	Did not advance to free dance	
28	Milla Ruud Reitan; Nikolaj Majorov	Sweden	61.13	28	61.13	Did not advance to free dance	
29	Mariia Nosovitskaya; Mikhail Nosovitskiy	Israel	59.16	29	59.16	Did not advance to free dance	
30	Chen Xizi; Xing Jianing	China	58.80	30	58.80	Did not advance to free dance	
31	Paulina Ramanauskaitė; Deividas Kizala	Lithuania	58.52	31	58.52	Did not advance to free dance	
32	Gina Zehnder; Beda Leon Sieber	Switzerland	58.19	32	58.19	Did not advance to free dance	
33	Solène Mazingue; Marko Jevgeni Gaidajenko	Estonia	57.09	33	57.09	Did not advance to free dance	
34	Olivia Oliver; Filip Bojanowski	Poland	54.19	34	54.19	Did not advance to free dance	
35	Hanna Jakucs; Alessio Galli	Netherlands	51.99	35	51.99	Did not advance to free dance	
36	Adrienne Carhart; Oleksandr Kolosovskyi	Azerbaijan	49.56	36	49.56	Did not advance to free dance	

== Quotas for the 2025 World Championships ==
Based on the results of the 2024 World Championships, these nations would be eligible to enter more than one skater or team at the 2025 World Figure Skating Championships in the indicated disciplines.

Number of entries per discipline
Spots	Men	Women	Pairs	Ice dance
3	Japan; United States	Japan; South Korea; United States	Canada; Germany; Japan	Canada; United States
2	France; Italy; Latvia; Switzerland; South Korea	Belgium; Switzerland	Australia; Georgia; Hungary; Italy; United States	Czech Republic; Finland; France; Great Britain; Italy; Lithuania

== Records ==
The following new record high score was set during this event.

Record high scores
Date	Skater	Disc.	Segment	Score	Ref.
23 March	(United States) Ilia Malinin	Men	Free skate	227.79	

== Works cited ==
- "Special Regulations & Technical Rules – Single & Pair Skating and Ice Dance 2022". International Skating Union. Archived from the original on 13 September 2023.
