= Mare Advertencia Lirika =

Mexican musician (born 1987)

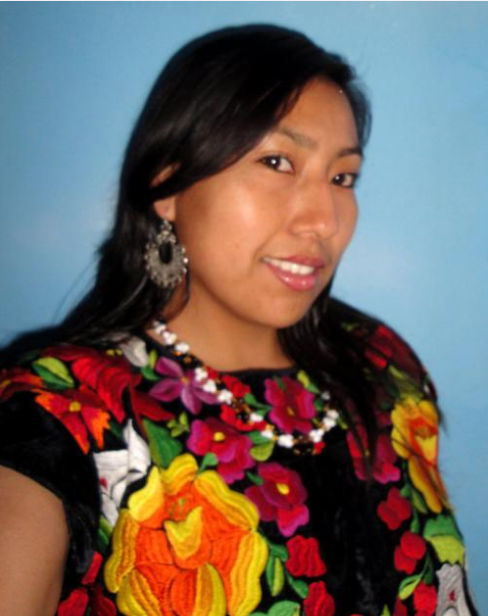

Background information
- Born: January 14, 1987 (age 39); Oaxaca, Mexico
- Genre: Hip hop
- Occupations: Singer-songwriter; rapper
- Years active: 2003–present

Mare Advertencia Lirika (born January 14, 1987) is a Mexican singer-songwriter and rapper. She is an indigenous woman of Zapotecan descent.

== Musical career ==
In 2003, Lirika's became a member of the hip-hop group Oaxside Connection, as one of two female members.

In 2004, she formed the female rap group Advertencia Lirika with other members Luna and Itza. In 2007, they released their first CD titled 3 Reinas (3 Queens). The group was active until 2009.

In 2010, Lirika released her first EP as a soloist, ¡Que mujer! (What a Woman!), a seven-song collection that focuses on injustices against indigenous women.

In 2022, the song "Árboles Bajo El Mar," performed by Lirika along with singer Vivir Quintana, was included in the soundtrack for the film Black Panther: Wakanda Forever.

== Discography ==
Release name	Date	Notes
3 Reinas	2007	As a member of Advertencia Lirika
¡Qué Mujer!	2010	As a solo artist
Experimental Prole	2013	As a solo artist
Siempreviva	2016	As a solo artist
