= Richard Kam =

New Zealander-South Korean ice dancer

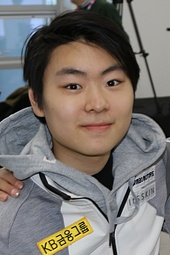

Personal information
- Native name: 감강인
- Other names: Kam Kang-in
- Born: 24 December 1996 (age 29) Christchurch, New Zealand
- Home town: Seoul
- Height: 1.75 m (5 ft 9 in)

Figure skating career
- Country: New Zealand
- Coach: Marie-France Dubreuil; Patrice Lauzon; Romain Haguenauer; Pascal Denis
- Retired: 28 July 2023

- Richard Kam
- Hangul: 감강인
- RR: Gam Gangin
- MR: Kam Kangin

Richard Kang-in Kam (born 24 December 1996) is a retired New Zealand and South Korean ice dancer who most recently competed with Charlotte Lafond-Fournier representing New Zealand.

Competing for South Korea with his former skating partner, Lee Ho-jung, he is a two-time national medalist and competed in the free dance at four ISU Championships.

== Early life ==
On 24 December 1996, Kam was born in Christchurch, New Zealand. He is the younger brother of Korean figure skater Alex Kang-chan Kam.

== Career ==
Kam began skating in 2005. He competed as a singles skater until the 2013–2014 season.

=== Ice dancing ===
In the 2014–15 season, Kam began competing in ice dancing with Lee Ho-jung. At the 2015 World Junior Championships in Tallinn, Estonia, they qualified to the final segment by placing twentieth in the short dance and went on to finish nineteenth overall.

Lee/Kam made their senior international debut in February 2016 at the Four Continents Championships in Taipei, Taiwan, where they finished tenth. In March, they placed fourteenth at the 2016 World Junior Championships in Debrecen, Hungary.

In their final season together, Lee/Kam won the silver medal at the South Korean championships and finished thirteenth at the 2017 Four Continents Championships. Lee Ho-jung announced on 3 April 2017, that their partnership has been dissolved.

After some years away from competition, Kam formed a new partnership with Canadian ice dancer Charlotte Lafond-Fournier, this time representing New Zealand. They made their Challenger series debut at the 2021 CS Autumn Classic International, where they finished in seventh. Lafond-Fournier/Kam next competed at the 2021 CS Nebelhorn Trophy, seeking to qualify a berth for a New Zealand dance team at the 2022 Winter Olympics, but finished in twelfth position, outside of qualification. Lafond-Fournier/Kam were ninth at the 2022 Four Continents Championships and twenty-fourth in their inaugural appearance at the World Championships.

== Programs ==
=== Ice dancing with Lafond-Fournier ===
| Season | Short dance | Free dance |
|---|---|---|
| 2021–2022 | Blues: Stay with Me by Sam Smith; Hip Hop: Latch by Disclosure, Sam Smith | Seven Nation Army (Grand Phabao Remix) performed by Alice Russell; Revolution by The Beatles; Seven Nation Army by The White Stripes |

=== Ice dancing with Lee ===
| Season | Short dance | Free dance |
|---|---|---|
| 2016–2017 | Blues: Creep by Radiohead covered by Postmodern Jukebox; Swing: That Man by Caro Emerald | Stairway to Heaven; Kashimir by Led Zeppelin |
| 2015–2016 | Waltz: La traviata by Giuseppe Verdi | Tango Amore by Edvin Marton; Tango de los Exilados by Vanessa-Mae |
| 2014–2015 | Rhumba: Pyramids of Pleasure; Samba: La Bomba | That's Life by Dean Kay and Kelly Gordon; The Lady Is a Tramp by Rodgers and Hart |

=== Single skating ===
| Season | Short program | Free skating |
|---|---|---|
| 2013–2014 | I'm your man by John Park | Endless Rain by X Japan |
| 2012–2013 | I'm your man by John Park | Warsaw Concerto by David Haines performed by The Paris Theatre Orchestra |
| 2011–2012 | Harry Potter and the Philosopher's Stone by John Williams | Warsaw Concerto by David Haines performed by The Paris Theatre Orchestra |
| 2010–2011 | Harry Potter and the Philosopher's Stone by John Williams | Dueling Banjos by David Garrett |

== Competitive highlights ==
=== With Lafond-Fournier for New Zealand ===
International
| Event | 21–22 | 22–23 |
|---|---|---|
| Worlds | 24th | 24th |
| Four Continents | 9th | 10th |
| CS Autumn Classic | 7th | |
| CS Golden Spin | | 10th |
| CS Ice Challenge | | 7th |
| CS Nebelhorn Trophy | 12th | |
| CS U.S. Classic | | 11th |
| Open d'Andorra | 7th | |
| Santa Claus Cup | 4th | 4th |
National
| New Zealand Champ. | | 1st |

=== With Lee for South Korea ===
International
| Event | 2014–15 | 2015–16 | 2016–17 |
|---|---|---|---|
| Four Continents | | 10th | 13th |
| Asian Games | | | 4th |
| Open d'Andorra | | | 6th |
International: Junior
| Junior Worlds | 19th | 14th | |
| JGP Slovakia | | 4th | |
| JGP USA | | 7th | |
| Tallinn Trophy | 4th J | | |
National
| South Korean | 1st J | 3rd | 2nd |
J = Junior level; JGP = Junior Grand Prix

=== Single skating for South Korea ===
| Event | 2011–12 | 2012–13 | 2013–14 |
National
| South Korean Champ. | 3rd J | 2nd J | 1st J |
J = Junior
