= Samuel Chouinard =

Canadian choreographer

Figure skating career
- Skating club: École de Patinage Montréal International Skating School

Samuel Chouinard is a Canadian choreographer from Saint-Jean-sur-Richelieu, Quebec. Chouinard has been an artistic director of École de Danse Denise Bonneau since 2005.

== Career ==
Chouinard works as a dancer, a dance teacher and a choreographer and he was trained in hip-hop, ballet, jazz and contemporary dance. He works closely with ice dance coaches Marie-France Dubreuil and Patrice Lauzon at Gadbois Centre in Montreal. Chouinard's other clients include Cirque du Soleil.

As a figure skating choreographer, Chouinard clients have included:

- (United States) Oona Brown / Gage Brown
- (United States) Nathan Chen
- (United States) Madison Chock / Evan Bates
- (Georgia (country)) Diana Davis / Gleb Smolkin
- (Denmark) (Canada) Laurence Fournier Beaudry / Nikolaj Sørensen
- (United Kingdom) Lilah Fear / Lewis Gibson
- (Japan) Rikako Fukase / Oliver Zhang
- (Australia) Holly Harris / Jason Chan
- (United States) Kaitlin Hawayek / Jean-Luc Baker
- (Ukraine) Mariia Holubtsova / Kyryl Bielobrov
- (United States) Madison Hubbell / Zachary Donohue
- (Japan) Misato Komatsubara / Tim Koleto
- (France) (Canada) Marie-Jade Lauriault / Romain Le Gac
- (South Korea) Hannah Lim / Ye Quan
- (France) Gabriella Papadakis / Guillaume Cizeron
- (Poland) Justyna Plutowska / Jérémie Flemin
- (Lithuania) Allison Reed / Saulius Ambrulevičius
- (Canada) Roman Sadovsky
- (Japan) Shun Sato
- (Spain) Olivia Smart / Adrián Díaz
- (Spain) Olivia Smart / Tim Dieck
- (United States) Andrew Torgashev
- (Canada) Tessa Virtue / Scott Moir
