= Lewis Gibson (figure skater) =

Scottish ice dancer (born 1994)

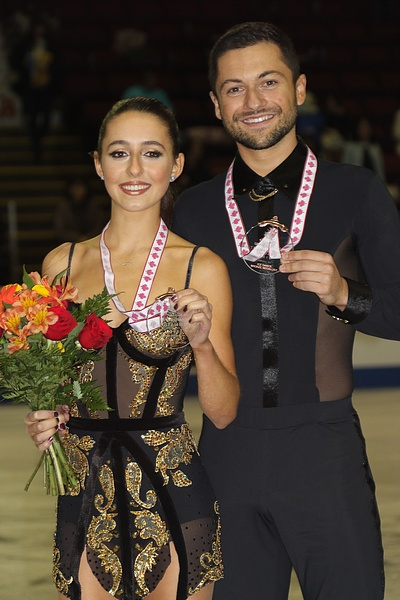
- Lilah Fear and Lewis Gibson at the 2019 Skate Canada

Personal information
- Born: 1 May 1994 (age 32) Prestwick, Scotland
- Home town: Montreal, Quebec, Canada
- Height: 1.75 m (5 ft 9 in)

Figure skating career
- Country: Great Britain
- Discipline: Ice dance (since 2016); Men's singles (2011–16)
- Partner: Lilah Fear (since 2016)
- Coach: Romain Haguenauer; Patrice Lauzon; Marie-France Dubreuil
- Skating club: Alexandra Palace London
- Began skating: 2006

Medal record
Event	Gold medal – first place	Silver medal – second place	Bronze medal – third place
World Championships	0	0	1
European Championships	0	2	2
Grand Prix Final	0	0	2
British Championships	7	2	0
Medal list
World Championships
Bronze medal – third place	2025 Boston	Ice dance
European Championships
Silver medal – second place	2023 Espoo	Ice dance
Silver medal – second place	2024 Kaunas	Ice dance
Bronze medal – third place	2025 Tallinn	Ice dance
Bronze medal – third place	2026 Sheffield	Ice dance
Grand Prix Final
Bronze medal – third place	2024–25 Grenoble	Ice dance
Bronze medal – third place	2025–26 Nagoya	Ice dance
British Championships
Gold medal – first place	2017 Sheffield	Ice dance
Gold medal – first place	2019 Sheffield	Ice dance
Gold medal – first place	2020 Sheffield	Ice dance
Gold medal – first place	2022 Sheffield	Ice dance
Gold medal – first place	2023 Sheffield	Ice dance
Gold medal – first place	2024 Sheffield	Ice dance
Gold medal – first place	2025 Sheffield	Ice dance
Silver medal – second place	2014 Sheffield	Singles
Silver medal – second place	2018 Sheffield	Ice dance

Lewis Gibson (born 1 May 1994) is a British ice dancer. With his skating partner, Lilah Fear, he is the 2025 World bronze medalist; theirs was the first World medal for Britain in 41 years. He is also a four-time European medalist, a two-time Grand Prix Final bronze medalist, an eleven-time Grand Prix medalist (including five gold), an eight-time ISU Challenger Series gold medalist, and an eight-time British national champion (2017, 2019–2020, 2022–2026). Fear and Gibson represented Great Britain at the 2022 and 2026 Winter Olympics.

== Personal life ==
Gibson was born on 1 May 1994 in Prestwick, Scotland. He was raised in Prestwick and played football before becoming interested in skating.

Gibson is gay and is married to Joshua Walsh. For some time, he was reluctant to publicly discuss his sexuality due to concerns about homophobia within the judged sport of figure skating, but subsequently said, "I can't live never sharing who I am and sharing who I love."

== Career ==
=== Early career ===
Gibson began skating in 2006 in Scotland, training at Ayr Ice Rink and Stevenston's Auchenharvie Leisure Centre. He cited the first series of Dancing on Ice, hosted by British ice dance champions Jayne Torvill and Christopher Dean, as his initial inspiration to begin skating. In addition to his career in men's singles, he competed in pairs for two seasons. In 2010–11, he and Heather Murdoch won the novice pairs title at the British Championships. They received the bronze medal the following season.

As a single skater, Gibson was coached by Jennifer Holmes at Ayr and Auchenharvie rinks before moving up to the junior international level. He then went on to train under Leanne Collins in East Kilbride, Scotland. Competing on the senior level, he won silver at the British Championships in November 2013. In the 2014–15 season, he appeared at two Challenger Series competitions, placing thirteenth at the Lombardia Trophy and Volvo Open Cup, and took the silver medal at the Hamar Trophy in Norway. He ended his singles career in December 2015.

=== 2016–2017 season: Switch to ice dance and debut of Fear/Gibson ===
Gibson began a partnership with Lilah Fear, coached by Karen Quinn at the Alexandra Palace Ice Rink in London, England, and by Romain Haguenauer in Montreal, Quebec, Canada. The duo made their international debut in late July 2016 at the Lake Placid Ice Dance International, finishing eleventh. Ranked second in both segments, they received the silver medal at a Challenger Series event, the Lombardia Trophy in September. They placed fifth at the International Cup of Nice and fourth at the Open d'Andorra. In December, they won the British national title, in the absence of longtime champions Coomes/Buckland, and silver at the Santa Claus Cup in Hungary.

In January 2017, Fear/Gibson qualified to the final segment at the European Championships in Ostrava, Czech Republic; they ranked nineteenth in the short dance, fourteenth in the free dance, and fifteenth overall. They made their World Championship debut later that season, placing twenty-second.

=== 2017–2018 season ===
Beginning their second season together, Fear/Gibson placed sixth at the International Cup of Nice and won silver medals at the Open d'Andorra and the Ice Challenge. They competed in three Challenger events that season, placing ninth at both the 2017 CS Finlandia Trophy and 2017 CS Lombardia Trophy and fourth at the 2017 CS Warsaw Cup. Competing at the British Championships, they won the silver medal, this time behind a returning Coomes/Buckland. They subsequently competed again at the Santa Claus Cup, placing fourth.

At the end of the season, they were again sent as Great Britain's representation to the 2018 World Championships, placing twenty-fourth.

=== 2018–2019 season: "Disco Brits" ===
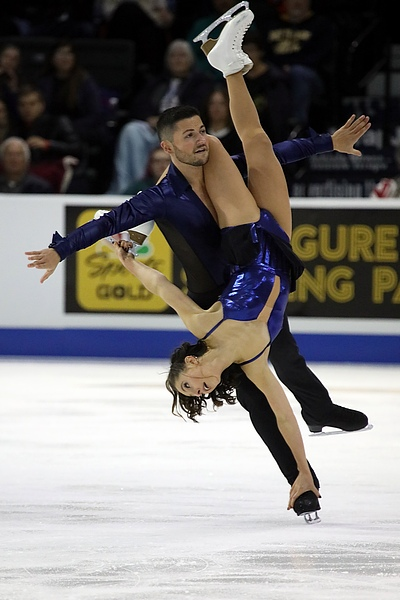
Fear & Gibson perform their trademark disco free dance at the 2018 Skate America

Wanting to challenge themselves, Fear/Gibson selected for their free dance a disco medley of songs by Donna Summer and Earth, Wind and Fire. Both professed as well to be fans of the genre. Gibson said, "A lot of the routines of recent times have been very slow and lyrical, but we wanted to do something fun and something that would stand out to help us make a name for ourselves." The free dance proved to be a huge success with audiences, facilitating what would be a dramatic rise up the international standings, and the team was nicknamed the "Disco Brits" by skating fans. Fear later credited the music selection as "a lucky choice, and from there, it completely redirected us to where we see ourselves going, what we feel is our style and what makes us unique."

Fear/Gibson began their season with two Challenger assignments, placing fourth at the 2018 CS Nebelhorn Trophy and fifth at the 2018 CS Ondrej Nepela Trophy. In October 2018, the two finished fifth at the 2018 Skate America – their Grand Prix debut. A month later, they improved their placement by finishing fourth at the 2018 NHK Trophy, achieving new personal bests in the free dance and overall score, and ranking second in the free dance.

After winning their second British national title, Fear/Gibson next competed at the 2019 European Championships, placing seventh in the rhythm dance and sixth in the free, for sixth place overall. They were pleased with the result, Gibson commenting that they "came in with the goal of a top-ten finish after we came 15th two years ago. Now we’ve managed to get two spots for Great Britain next year, which is really exciting." At the 2019 World Championships, they placed thirteenth, having made the free dance for the first time.

=== 2019–2020 season: First Grand Prix medal ===
After the success of their disco free dance the previous season, Fear and Gibson chose a Madonna medley for their new free dance, aiming to continue the momentum of past success with audience-pleasing choices. For the rhythm dance, required to be musical-themed, Gibson identified tracks from The Blues Brothers. Fear remarked that they "knew that could get the crowd on its feet, hopefully, and people would be tapping their toes."

Fear/Gibson began the season on the Challenger series, winning the silver medal at the 2019 CS Autumn Classic International after placing fifth in the rhythm dance and second in the free dance. At their second Challenger, the 2019 CS Nebelhorn Trophy, they placed sixth in the rhythm dance and third in the free, for fourth place overall. Assigned to two Grand Prix events, they began at 2019 Skate Canada International, where they placed fourth in the rhythm dance and third in the free skate, taking the bronze medal. This was the team's first Grand Prix medal and the first for a British team since 2014. Gibson remarked: "For us, this is huge. We didn't expect it." Competing again at the NHK Trophy, they were fourth in the rhythm dance, earning a perfect score on the Finnstep pattern dance for the first time. They were third in the free dance, remaining in fourth place overall.

At the 2020 British Championships, Fear/Gibson placed first in the rhythm dance even though Fear had fallen out of the twizzles and placed first in the free winning their third national title by 73.37 points. In what proved to be their final event of the season, they competed at the 2020 European Championships and placed sixth in the rhythm dance, with Fear losing a twizzle level and them getting only one of the four key points on the Finnstepp pattern dance. Fifth in the free dance, they rose to fifth place overall. They had been assigned to compete at the World Championships in Montreal, but these were cancelled as a result of the coronavirus pandemic.

=== 2020–2021 season ===
Fear/Gibson were assigned to the 2020 Skate Canada International, but this event was also cancelled due to the pandemic. As there were no British championships for the season as a result of the pandemic, on 3 December, they were named to Britain's team for the European Championships, alongside Fear's younger sister Sasha. The competition was cancelled on 10 December.

Fear/Gibson were again named to represent Britain at the 2021 World Championships in Stockholm, where they placed eighth in the rhythm dance before moving up to seventh place in the free dance, surpassing the Canadian team Fournier Beaudry/Sørensen by 0.04 points. Their results qualified a second dance berth for Great Britain at the following year's World Championships and the possibility of a second place at the 2022 Winter Olympics in Beijing.

=== 2021–2022 season: Beijing Olympics ===
For their new free dance for the season, Fear/Gibson chose Hans Zimmer's soundtrack from The Lion King, citing it as a "universal" story about "finding your inner strength." They selected a medley of Kiss songs for the rhythm dance, which Gibson attributed to "nostalgia and the want to entertain. That’s what we love to do."

Fear/Gibson began the season at the 2021 CS Finlandia Trophy, winning the bronze medal. At their first Grand Prix assignment, the 2021 Skate Canada International, Fear/Gibson made errors in both segments of the competition, ending up in an unexpectedly low seventh place. Gibson said it was "not what we wanted to do, but we felt strong and connected in the free dance." Following this, they dedicated intensive training time in the short interval before their second event, the 2021 NHK Trophy. Third in both segments there, despite a twizzle error from Gibson in the free dance, they won the bronze medal after finishing fourth in two previous appearances at the Japanese Grand Prix. Fear said, "we were really hungry to come out here to make progress, and I feel like we did that."

After winning the Open d'Andorra and their fourth British national title, Fear/Gibson were assigned to the British Olympic team. Gibson remarked, "to feel like years and years of hard work and dedication have paid off is truly one of the most satisfying things." At the 2022 European Championships, Fear/Gibson were fourth in the rhythm dance but fell to fifth place after a twizzle error from Gibson in the free dance.

Competing at the 2022 Winter Olympics in the dance event, Fear/Gibson were tenth in the rhythm dance. They were ninth in the free dance, remaining tenth overall. They finished the season at the 2022 World Championships, held with the Russian dance teams absent due to the International Skating Union banning all Russian athletes due to their country's invasion of Ukraine. They were seventh in the rhythm dance but rose to sixth with a new personal best in the free dance.

=== 2022–2023 season: European silver ===
Fear and Gibson selected for their free dance a medley of Lady Gaga songs, including "Born This Way" which Fear said, "we are really motivated by the message" of. They began the season at the inaugural edition of British Ice Skating's Britannia Cup, winning the gold medal. They appeared twice on the Challenger circuit, winning gold at both the 2022 CS U.S. Classic and the 2022 CS Nebelhorn Trophy, and setting new personal bests at the latter.

On the Grand Prix at the 2022 Skate Canada International, the team again set new personal bests on their way to a silver medal finish. Two weeks later, they were given the unique opportunity to participate in a Grand Prix event on home soil, as the British federation had stepped up to host the 2022 MK John Wilson Trophy in lieu of the Cup of China, which had been cancelled due to Chinese pandemic measures. Gibson "really didn't think a home Grand Prix would ever happen." They placed second in the rhythm dance, 0.93 points behind Italians Guignard/Fabbri. With the stands full of fans touting the Union Jack and, in one instance in support of Gibson, the Saltire, both called it a remarkable experience, Fear noting "we're used to seeing that in other countries for their home teams, so the fact that it was for us was such a surprise." In the free dance, Gibson lost control during their choreographic twizzle element, resulting in them scoring below their personal best, but they remained second in the segment overall to take their second silver medal. Their results qualified them for the Grand Prix Final. They were the first British team to qualify for the Final since Sinead and John Kerr in 2009.

Fear/Gibson won their fifth British national title at the beginning of December, with Gibson saying on the occasion, "it's always such a special honour to etch our names again onto one of the most prestigious trophies in Great Britain sports." They were fifth in the rhythm dance at the Grand Prix Final in Turin. Fear likened the experience of the Final to "a dream in Disneyland." They were fourth in the free dance and rose to fourth overall following a major error by Canadian training partners Fournier Beaudry/Sørensen, who dropped to sixth. Fear and Gibson said that they were pleased by the experience and anticipating working on their levelled elements in advance of the European Championships, where they were expected to be in medal contention.

At the 2023 European Championships in Espoo, Fear/Gibson entered hoping to challenge Guignard/Fabbri for the gold medal. They scored 84.12 in the rhythm dance, close to their personal best, finishing second in that segment behind the Italians and claiming their first European small medal. They were second in the free dance as well, winning the silver medal, their first ISU championship medal. This was the first European medal for a British team since Coomes/Buckland in 2014, and the highest placement on the podium since Torvill/Dean's gold in 1994.

Fear/Gibson concluded the season at the 2023 World Championships, where they finished a career-best fourth, 3.15 points back of bronze medalists Gilles/Poirier.

=== 2023–2024 season: European silver and first Grand Prix gold ===
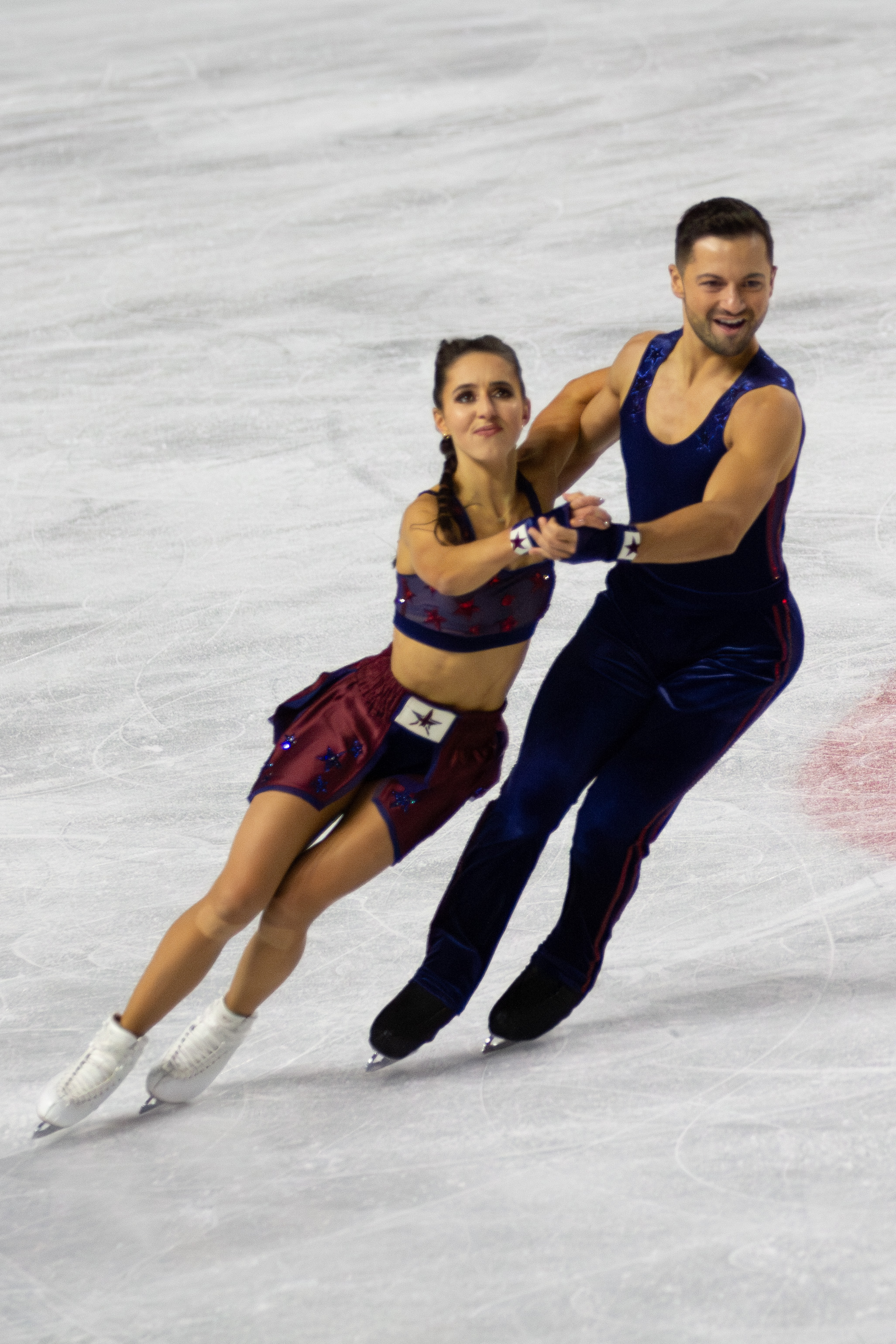
Fear/Gibson in the rhythm dance at the 2023 Skate Canada International

For their free dance, Fear and Gibson used the music of the Rocky film franchise, citing its themes of "overcoming adversity and finding strength." "It’s so well known," Fear said. "To be able to tell that story on the ice, it’s something that we connect to as humans.” In their first competition of the season, Fear/Gibson won gold at the Nebelhorn Trophy for the second consecutive season. Weeks later they won a second Challenger gold at the 2023 CS Nepela Memorial.

On the Grand Prix, the team again began at the 2023 Skate Canada International, winning the silver medal for a second consecutive year. At the 2023 NHK Trophy, Fear/Gibson finished second in the rhythm dance, only 0.34 points behind reigning World bronze medalists Guignard/Fabbri, the pre-event favourites. They won the free dance with a score of 130.26, breaking the 130-point threshold for the first time, overtaking Guignard/Fabbri in the segment by a similarly narrow 0.97 points and winning the gold medal. This was their first Grand Prix victory, and the first for a British dance team. They hailed the result as "a dream come true."

Following their success on the Grand Prix, Fear/Gibson successfully defended their British national title once again. Entering the Grand Prix Final in Beijing with hopes of building on their success at the NHK Trophy, they had serious twizzle difficulties that saw them place fourth in the rhythm dance, but nearly nine points back of third-place Canadians Gilles/Poirier. They had a strong free dance, but remained fourth overall.

At the 2024 European Championships in Kaunas, Fear/Gibson finished second in both the rhythm dance and free dance, in the latter segment having an error on their dance spin and Fear losing a twizzle level. She noted they had "a couple of little blips, but we fought till the very end, from start to finish." They won their second consecutive European silver medal. The 2024 World Championships were held in Montreal, home of the team's training base. Fear/Gibson placed fourth in both segments and fourth overall, for the second year in a row.

=== 2024–2025 season: World, European, and Grand Prix Final bronze ===
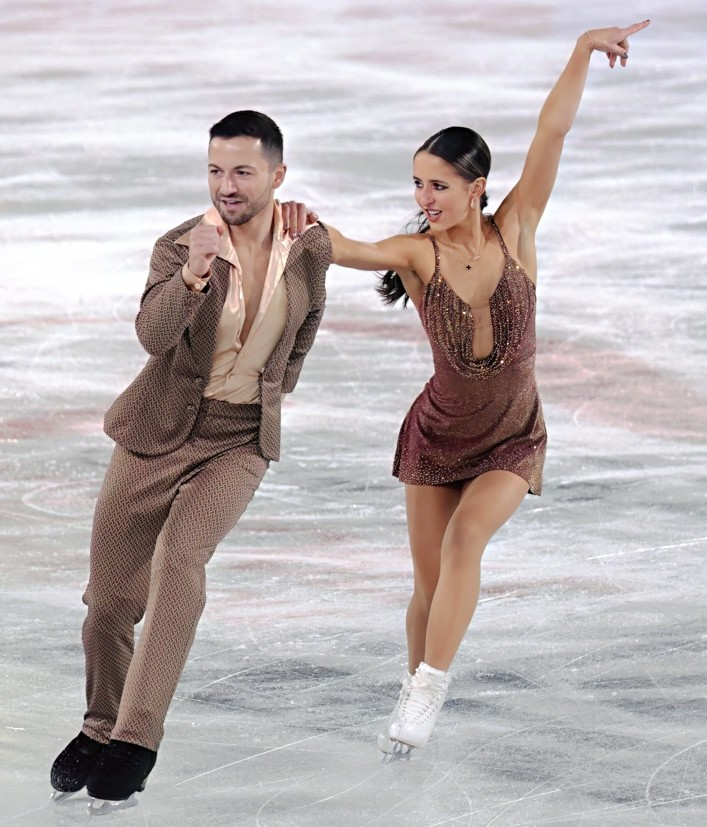
Fear/Gibson during the rhythm dance at the 2024–25 Grand Prix Final

In their first international competition of the season, Fear and Gibson won gold at the 2024 CS Nebelhorn Trophy. On the Grand Prix, they entered the Skate America in Allen, Texas as the favourites for the silver medal, behind reigning World champions Chock/Bates of the United States. However, Fear/Gibson won the rhythm dance segment after Chock fell, and enjoyed a margin of more than five points on the Americans going into the free dance. They came second in the free dance, but remained in first place by a margin of 0.75 points. They were the first non-American dance team to win Skate America since 2008. The following weekend they contested a second Challenger event, winning another gold at the CS Nepela Memorial. At their second Grand Prix assignment, the Finlandia Trophy, Fear/Gibson were again not the favourites at the outset, coming second in the rhythm dance behind reigning World silver medalists Gilles/Poirier of Canada. However, the frontrunners faltered again, with Poirier falling in the free dance, and the British claimed their second Grand Prix gold of the season.

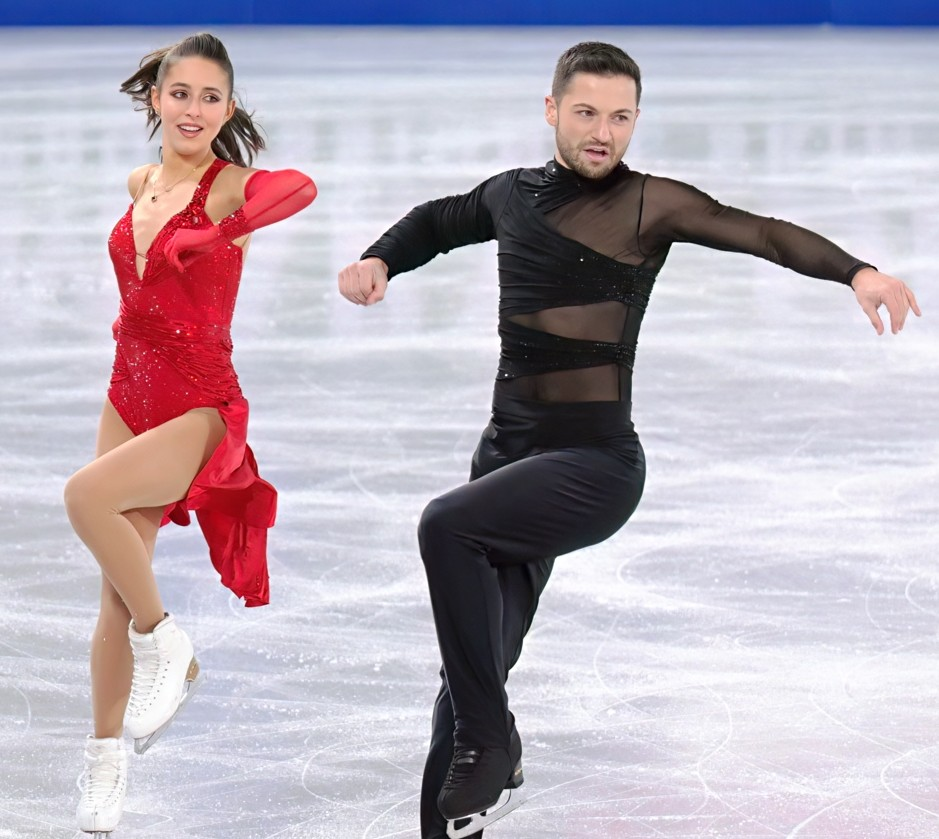
Fear/Gibson during the free dance at the 2024–25 Grand Prix Final

Following their Grand Prix events, Fear/Gibson won their seventh British national title, equaling their idols Torvill and Dean's tally. At the 2024–25 Grand Prix Final in Grenoble, Fear/Gibson finished third in the rhythm dance segment, after Gilles/Poirier finished last in the segment with another fall. Fear/Gibson were fourth in the free dance, the Canadians rebounding to come second in that segment, but the British remained in third overall and won the bronze medal. This was the first-ever British medal at the Grand Prix Final. Gibson called it "a huge achievement. It's one of those things that are in a next level to reach, and we are so pleased."

Having been silver medalists at the prior two European Championships, Fear and Gibson entered the 2025 edition in Tallinn hoping to challenge Italian reigning champions Guignard/Fabbri for the gold. However, they finished an unexpected third in the rhythm dance, behind both the Italians and the French team Lopareva/Brissaud. They rebounded somewhat in the free dance, coming second in that segment, but remained in third overall, 0.74 points behind Lopareva/Brissaud. The two expressed satisfaction in their performance in the free, Fear saying "I feel nothing but pride for ourselves."

Despite the European result, Fear and Gibson expressed optimism about their chance of reaching the World podium for the first time at the 2025 World Championships in Boston. They came third in the rhythm dance with a score of 83.86, behind Chock/Bates and Gilles/Poirier but 0.82 points ahead of Guignard/Fabbri in fourth, the Italians having struggled with their twizzle elements. The team earned a bronze small medal for the segment. Fear/Gibson had some technical issues in the free dance, including a point deduction for an extended lift, and came sixth in that segment, but their score (123.25) was sufficient to remain in third overall. This was the first World medal for a British competitor since Torvill/Dean's final gold medal in 1984. Fear called it "a dream come true," while Gibson said he hoped "that there are little kids out there in Great Britain seeing this and wanting to put their skates on as well."

=== 2025–2026 season: Milano Cortina Olympics, Worlds, Europeans, and Grand Prix Final ===
Fear and Gibson opened their season with a win at the 2025 Bolero Cup in September. A few weeks later, they took their seventh consecutive ISU Challenger Series gold at 2025 Nebelhorn Trophy. The following month, they placed a close second behind the new team of France's Laurence Fournier Beaudry and Guillaume Cizeron at 2025 Grand Prix de France. "It's been a decade of amazing memories. We've had highs and lows, and it was fun looking through our videos from all this time together," said Fear of their 10-year-partnership.

Fear/Gibson competing at the 2026 Winter Olympics – Team Event

Three weeks later, Fear and Gibson won the gold at 2025 NHK Trophy, thus qualifying for the 2025–26 Grand Prix Final. The team posted a new personal best in the free dance. "We're both very proud of the competitions that we've had so far this season," said Gibson. "Just being able to feel more like it's our training that's in the competition has been such a big step up for us this season, and something that we definitely look to build upon for the rest of the season."

In December, after winning their eighth British national title, Fear and Gibson took their second consecutive Grand Prix Final bronze medal at 2025–26 Grand Prix Final. "I think we’re both very proud of how we’ve competed so far," said Gibson. "It feels like a great achievement and I’m just really looking forward to getting back to work and our next competitions." Shortly following the event, Fear and Gibson were named in the Great Britain team for the 2026 Winter Olympics.

The following month, Fear and Gibson took the bronze at the 2026 European Championships. "Today was not ideal, definitely not what we planned," said Fear after the free dance. "So of course we’re really frustrated about that. But I’m extremely proud of how we came back after the mistake. And we did want to enjoy the rest of it, so we really made sure to flip that switch and take in the amazing opportunity of skating with the whole crowd."

On 6 February, Fear and Gibson took part in the team event at the 2026 Winter Olympics Figure Skating Team Event and got third place in the rhythm dance, scoring their personal best 86.75.

On 9 February, Fear and Gibson competed in the rhythm dance segment of the individual ice dance event, placing fourth in that segment, only 0.71 points behind third place. Two days later, Fear and Gibson competed in the free dance segment and finished in seventh place overall, earning them an Olympic diploma for a top eight finish and the highest placement in ice dance since Torvill and Dean.

The following month, Fear and Gibson competed at the 2026 World Figure Skating Championships where they finished fourth behind USA's Emilea Zingas and Vadym Kolesnik. They were in third place after the Rhythm Dance, but received a two-point deduction in the Free Dance for an "illegal movement," placing fifth in that segment. “These results do motivate us,” said Gibson. “Like Sheffield was not how we wanted to perform or skate, either. Nor the result that we wanted. The same thing at the Olympics was not what we wanted nor what we had trained. That ultimately motivated us to keep going and keep pushing and to get the performance like we did today.”

=== 2026–27 season ===
Fear/Gibson opened their season in early September at the 2026 Bolero Cup where they finished first. The team then went on to win the gold medal at 2026 Skate Canada International, bringing their Grand Prix individual medal tally to 11. “It’s very special,” Gibson said of the gold medal. “It’s our second time medaling here in Kelowna, so that’s a little extra sweet in itself. And it’s a good start to our Grand Prix Series.”

The following week, Fear/Gibson won the title at 2026 Cup of China. “In the next few weeks, we have competitions and Nationals,” said Fear. “I think we’ll take every chance we get to train, make strides, and improve on everything we’ve identified over the past two competitions. We’re just looking forward to what’s next.”

== Programs ==
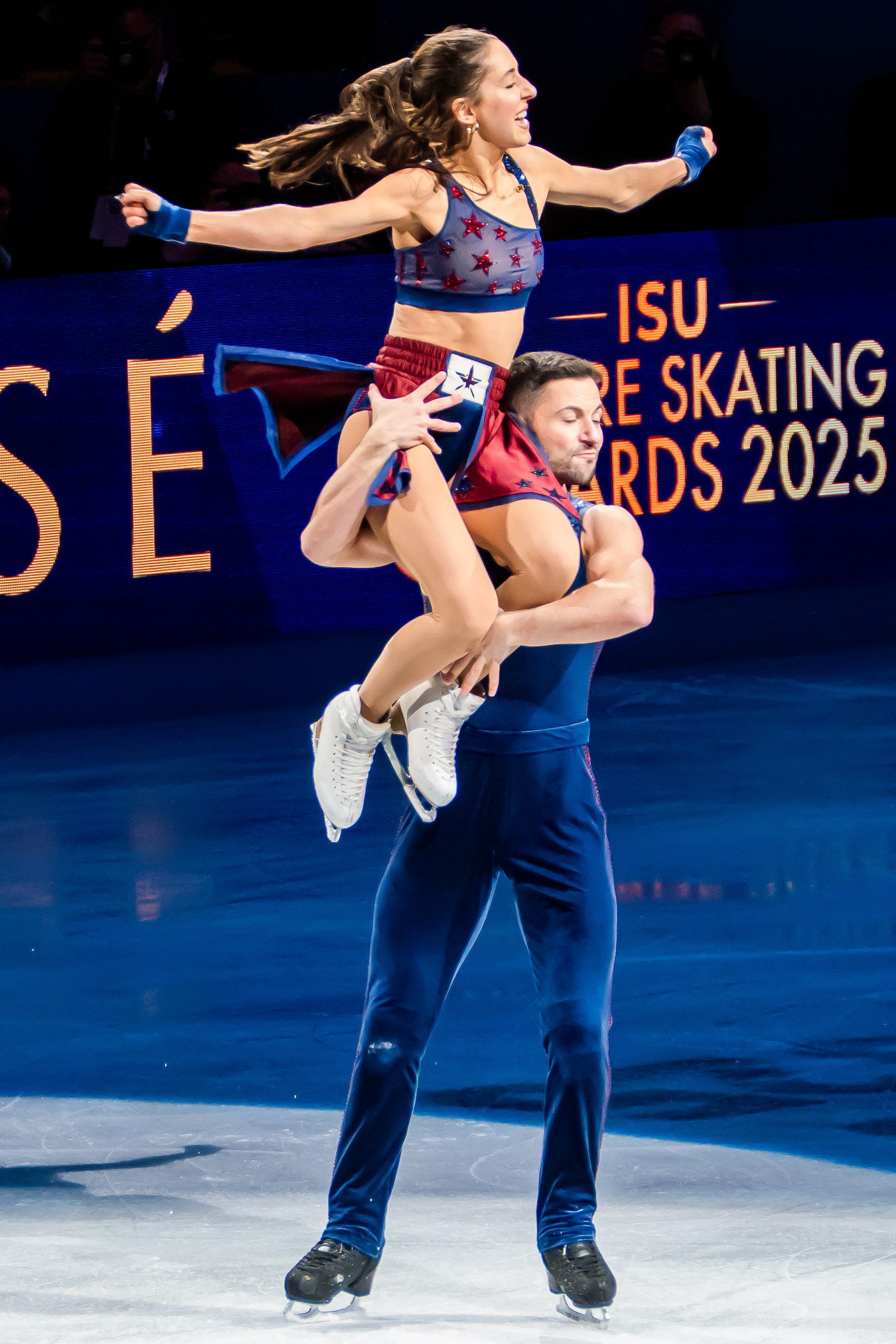
Fear and Gibson during the gala at the 2025 World Championships

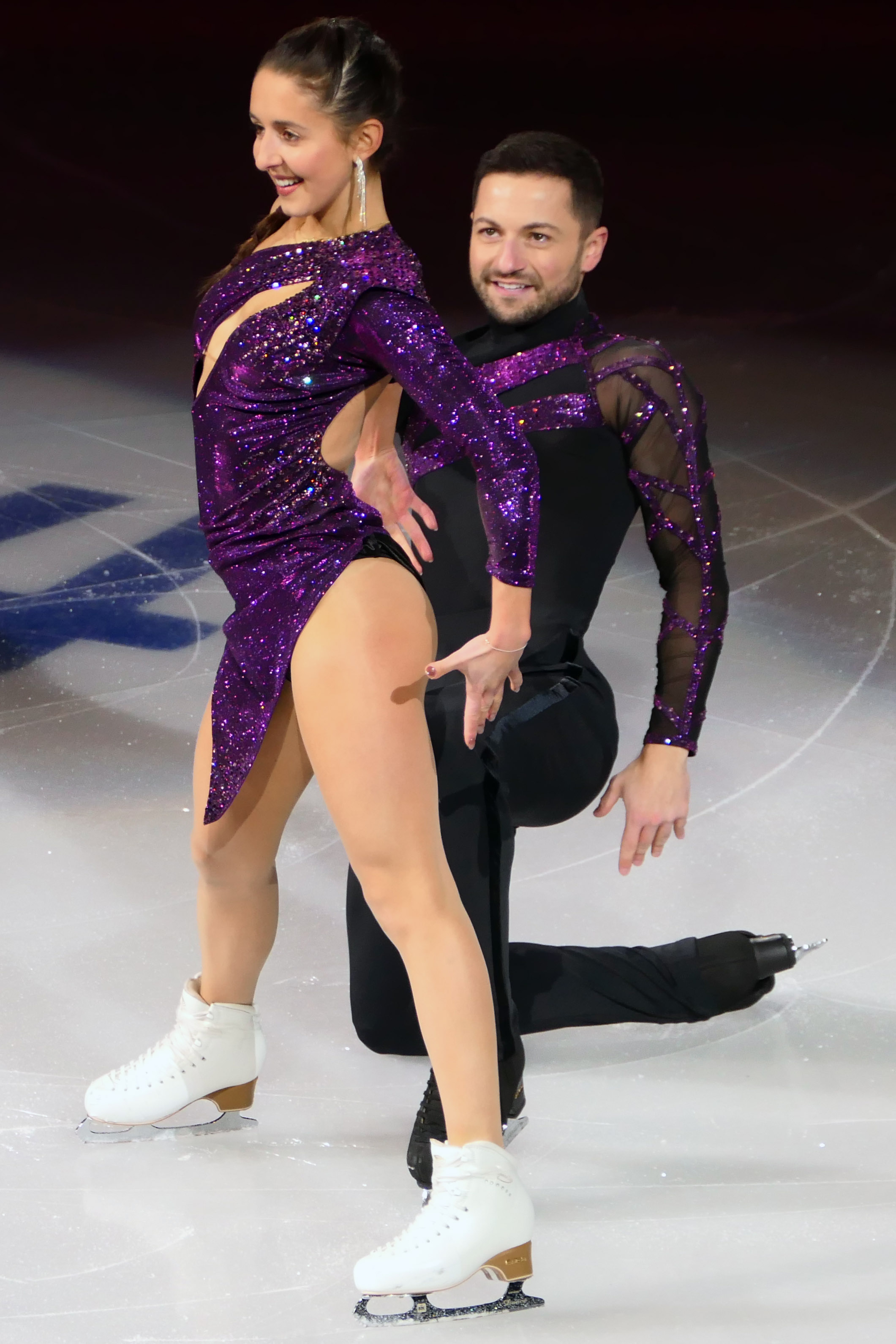
Fear and Gibson during the gala at the 2024 World Championships

=== Ice dance with Lilah Fear ===
Season	Short dance	Free dance	Exhibition
2026–2027	EL Flamenco by Mëstiza, Aaron Sevilla; Uccen - DWTS Remix by Taalbi Brothers; Bamboleo; Vamos a Bailar; Bamboleo by Gipsy Kings	The Sparkling Diamond (from "Moulin Rouge! The Musical"); Get The Party Started by Shirley Bassey	
2025–2026	Wannabe (Junior Vasquez Remix Edit) by Spice Girls & Junior Vasquez; Who Do You Think You Are by Spice Girls; Spice Up Your Life (Morales Radio Mix) by Spice Girls & David Morales choreo. by Romain Haguenauer, Samuel Chouinard, Randi Strong	The Bonnie Banks of Loch Lomond by Ella Roberts; I'm Gonna Be (500 Miles) by The Proclaimers; The Bonnie Banks of Loch Lomond by Ella Roberts; Auld Lang Syne choreo. by Romain Haguenauer, Samuel Chouinard, Randi Strong	
2025–2026	Wannabe (Junior Vasquez Remix Edit) by Spice Girls & Junior Vasquez; Viva Forever by Spice Girls; Spice Up Your Life (Morales Radio Mix) by Spice Girls & David Morales choreo. by Romain Haguenauer, Samuel Chouinard, Randi Strong	The Bonnie Banks of Loch Lomond by Ella Roberts; I'm Gonna Be (500 Miles) by The Proclaimers; The Bonnie Banks of Loch Lomond by Ella Roberts; Auld Lang Syne choreo. by Romain Haguenauer, Samuel Chouinard, Randi Strong	These Boots Are Made for Walkin' (Remix) performed by The Supremes; Ya Ya by Beyoncé; Gonna Fly Now (from Rocky) by Bill Conti; Gonna Fly Now (Variation) (from Rocky the Musical) performed by Rocky Broadway Orchestra; Eye of the Tiger performed by Tommee Profitt, Fjora; Eye of the Tiger (from Rocky III) by Survivor choreo. by Romain Haguenauer, Samuel Chouinard, Ginette Cournoyer
2024–2025	Le Freak (Dimitri from Paris Remix) by Chic; Superstition by Stevie Wonder choreo. by Romain Haguenauer, Samuel Chouinard, Ginette Cournoyer	Halo; End of Time; Crazy in Love (Homecoming Live) by Beyoncé choreo. by Romain Haguenauer, Samuel Chouinard, Ginette Cournoyer	Gonna Fly Now (from Rocky) by Bill Conti; Gonna Fly Now (Variation) (from Rocky the Musical) performed by Rocky Broadway Orchestra; Eye of the Tiger performed by Tommee Profitt, Fjora; Eye of the Tiger (from Rocky III) by Survivor choreo. by Romain Haguenauer, Samuel Chouinard, Ginette Cournoyer
2023–2024	Sweet Dreams (Are Made of This) (Hot Remix); Here Comes the Rain Again; Sweet Dreams (Are Made of This) (Steve Angello Remix) by Eurythmics choreo. by Romain Haguenauer, Samuel Chouinard, Ginette Cournoyer	Gonna Fly Now (from Rocky) by Bill Conti; Gonna Fly Now (Variation) (from Rocky the Musical) performed by Rocky Broadway Orchestra; Eye of the Tiger performed by Tommee Profitt, Fjora; Eye of the Tiger (from Rocky III) by Survivor choreo. by Romain Haguenauer, Samuel Chouinard, Ginette Cournoyer	Born This Way by Lady Gaga choreo. by Romain Haguenauer, Samuel Chouinard, Ginette Cournoyer
2022–2023	Vivir Mi Vida; Vivir Mi Vida (Version Pop) performed by Marc Anthony; No Me Ames by Marc Anthony and Jennifer Lopez choreo. by Romain Haguenauer, Samuel Chouinard, Ginette Cournoyer	Born This Way; Million Reasons by Lady Gaga choreo. by Romain Haguenauer, Samuel Chouinard, Ginette Cournoyer	Born This Way by Lady Gaga choreo. by Romain Haguenauer, Samuel Chouinard, Ginette Cournoyer; Easy on Me performed by Adele & Ben Woodward
2021–2022	Disco: I Was Made for Lovin' You; Blues: Forever; Disco: Rock and Roll All Nite by Kiss choreo. by Romain Haguenauer, Samuel Chouinard, Ginette Cournoyer	Circle of Life/Nants' Ingonyama; They Live In You; He Lives in You; Circle of Life; King of Pride Rock/Circle of Life (Reprise) (from The Lion King) by Hans Zimmer choreo. by Romain Haguenauer, Samuel Chouinard, Ginette Cournoyer	Vogue; Like a Prayer by Madonna
2019–2021	Swing: Soul Man; Quickstep: Everybody Needs Somebody to Love; Swing/Jive: Shake a Tail Feather (from The Blues Brothers) performed by The Blues Brothers choreo. by Romain Haguenauer, Samuel Chouinard, Ginette Cournoyer	Vogue; Like a Prayer by Madonna choreo. by Romain Haguenauer, Samuel Chouinard, Ginette Cournoyer	Car Wash by Rose Royce; Bad Girls; On the Radio by Donna Summer; Don't Stop 'Til You Get Enough by Michael Jackson
2018–2019	Tango: Tango Flamenco by Armik; Flamenco: Volare (Nel blu dipinto di blu) by Gipsy Kings choreo. by Romain Haguenauer	Bad Girls by Donna Summer; September by Earth, Wind & Fire; On the Radio by Donna Summer choreo. by Romain Haguenauer	
2017–2018	Run by Tiggs Da Author; Temptation by Diana Krall; Maria by Ricky Martin choreo. by Romain Haguenauer	Maria performed by Jim Bryant; Somewhere; America (from West Side Story) by Leonard Bernstein, Stephen Sondheim choreo. by Romain Haguenauer	
2016–2017	Blues: Save My Soul; Swing: Diga Diga Doo performed by Big Bad Voodoo Daddy	You Raise Me Up by Josh Groban; The New Hope Waltz by Karl Hugo; You Raise Me Up by Josh Groban	

=== Men's singles ===
Season	Short program	Free skating
2014–2015	Send In the Clowns by Stephen Sondheim performed by André Rieu	Concierto de Aranjuez by Joaquín Rodrigo performed by André Rieu

== Competitive highlights ==
- GP – Event of the ISU Grand Prix Series
- JGP – Event of the ISU Junior Grand Prix Series
- CS – Event of the ISU Challenger Series
- TBD – Assigned
- WD – Withdrew from competition
- C – Event was cancelled
- Medals at team events are awarded for the team results only. Individual placements at team events are listed in parentheses.

=== Ice dance with Lilah Fear ===
Competition placements at senior level
Season	2016–17	2017–18	2018–19	2019–20	2020–21	2021–22	2022–23	2023–24	2024–25	2025–26	2026-27
Winter Olympics						10th				7th	
Winter Olympics (Team event)										9th	
World Championships	22nd	24th	13th	C	7th	6th	4th	4th	3rd	4th	
European Championships	15th		6th	5th	C	5th	2nd	2nd	3rd	3rd	
Grand Prix Final							4th	4th	3rd	3rd	TBD
British Championships	1st	2nd	1st	1st		1st	1st	1st	1st	1st	
GP Cup of China											1st
GP Finland									1st		
GP France										2nd	
GP NHK Trophy			4th	4th		3rd		1st		1st	
GP Skate America			5th						1st		
GP Skate Canada				3rd		7th	2nd	2nd			1st
GP Wilson Trophy							2nd				
CS Autumn Classic				2nd							
CS Finlandia Trophy		9th				3rd					
CS Lombardia Trophy	2nd	9th									
CS Nebelhorn Trophy			4th	4th			1st	1st	1st	1st	WD
CS Nepela Memorial			5th					1st	1st		
CS U.S. Classic							1st				
CS Warsaw Cup		4th									
Bavarian Open		1st									
Bolero Cup										1st	1st
Britannia Cup							1st				
Ice Challenge		2nd									
Lake Placid Ice Dance	11th										
Mentor Cup		2nd									
Open d'Andorra	4th	2nd				1st					
Santa Claus Cup	2nd	4th									
Shanghai Trophy				2nd							
Trophée Métropole Nice	5th	6th									

=== Single skating ===
International
Event	11–12	12–13	13–14	14–15	15–16
CS Lombardia Trophy				13th	
CS Volvo Open Cup				13th	
Hamar Trophy				2nd	
NRW Trophy			12th		
Triglav Trophy	10th J	4th J			
National
British Champ.	5th J	4th J	2nd	4th	5th

== Detailed results ==
=== Ice dance with Lilah Fear ===
ISU personal best scores in the +5/-5 GOE System
Segment	Type	Score	Event
Total	TSS	215.19	2023 NHK Trophy
Rhythm dance	TSS	86.85	2026 Winter Olympics (Team event)
Rhythm dance	TES	50.08	2026 Winter Olympics (Team event)
Rhythm dance	PCS	37.11	2024 CS Nepela Memorial
Free dance	TSS	130.26	2023 NHK Trophy
Free dance	TES	73.98	2023 NHK Trophy
Free dance	PCS	56.28	2023 NHK Trophy

ISU personal best scores in the +3/-3 GOE System
Segment	Type	Score	Event
Total	TSS	150.46	2017 CS Warsaw Cup
Rhythm dance	TSS	60.40	2017 CS Warsaw Cup
Rhythm dance	TES	31.03	2017 CS Warsaw Cup
Rhythm dance	PCS	29.37	2017 CS Warsaw Cup
Free dance	TSS	90.06	2017 CS Warsaw Cup
Free dance	TES	48.96	2016 CS Lombardia Trophy
Free dance	PCS	44.90	2017 CS Warsaw Cup

Results in the 2016-17 season
Date	Event	SP		FS		Total	
Date	Event	P	Score	P	Score	P	Score
Jul 29-30, 2016	(United States) 2016 Lake Place Ice Dance International	12	43.78	9	71.71	11	115.49
Sept 8-11, 2016	(Italy) 2016 CS Lombardia Trophy	2	53.38	2	86.22	2	139.60
Oct 14-16, 2016	(France) 2016 Cup of Nice	5	56.60	5	82.40	5	148.04
Nov 16-20, 2016	(Spain) 2016 Open d'Andorra	4	58.30	4	89.74	4	148.04
Nov 29-Dec 4, 2016	(United Kingdom) 2017 British Championships	1	65.86	1	97.18	1	163.04
Dec 6-11, 2016	(Hungary) 2016 Santa Claus Cup	1	55.38	2	86.40	2	141.78
Jan 25-29, 2017	(Czech Republic) 2017 European Championships	19	50.75	14	86.24	15	136.99
Mar 29-Apr 2, 2017	(Finland) 2017 World Championships	22	54.82		—N/a	22	54.82

Results in the 2017-18 season
Date	Event	SP		FS		Total	
Date	Event	P	Score	P	Score	P	Score
Sept 14-17, 2017	(Italy) 2017 CS Lombardia Trophy	6	53.70	10	70.52	9	124.22
Oct 6-8, 2017	(Finland) 2017 CS Finlandia Trophy	12	50.83	6	88.78	9	139.61
Oct 11-15, 2017	(France) 2017 Cup of Nice	7	55.80	6	89.70	6	145.50
Nov 9-12, 2017	(Austria) 2017 Ice Challenge	2	55.76	2	89.93	2	145.69
Nov 16-19, 2017	(Poland) 2017 CS Warsaw Cup	4	60.40	4	90.06	4	150.46
Nov 22-26, 2017	(Spain) 2017 Open d'Andorra	5	55.45	2	93.71	2	149.16
Nov 28-Dec 4, 2017	(United Kingdom) 2018 British Championships	2	60.39	2	106.87	2	167.26
Dec 4-10, 2017	(Hungary) 2017 Santa Claus Cup	5	60.82	4	93.74	4	154.56
Jan 26-31, 2018	(Germany) 2018 Bavarian Open	2	59.08	1	95.55	1	154.63
Jan 30-Feb 4, 2018	(Poland) 2018 Mentor Toruń Cup	3	60.33	2	98.66	2	158.99
Mar 19-25, 2018	(Italy) 2018 World Championships	24	57.56	—N/a	—N/a	24	57.66

Results in the 2018-19 season
Date	Event	SP		FS		Total	
Date	Event	P	Score	P	Score	P	Score
Sept 19-22, 2018	(Slovakia) 2018 CS Nepela Trophy	8	59.34	4	99.51	5	158.85
Sept 26-29, 2018	(Germany) 2018 CS Nebelhorn Trophy	6	57.30	4	103.31	4	160.61
Oct 19-21, 2018	(United States) 2018 Skate America	5	64.71	5	105.99	5	170.70
Nov 9-11, 2018	(Japan) 2018 NHK Trophy	7	63.91	2	113.29	4	177.20
Nov 26-Dec 1, 2018	(United Kingdom) 2019 British Championships	2	61.82	1	120.07	1	181.89
Jan 21-27, 2019	(Belarus) 2019 European Championships	7	69.77	6	112.28	6	182.05
Mar 18-24, 2019	(Japan) 2019 World Championships	15	68.46	11	111.11	13	179.57

Results in the 2019-20 season
Date	Event	SP		FS		Total	
Date	Event	P	Score	P	Score	P	Score
Sept 12-14, 2019	(Canada) 2019 CS Autumn Classic	5	70.06	2	114.03	2	184.09
Sept 25-28, 2019	(Germany) 2019 CS Nebelhorn Trophy	6	74.82	3	113.43	4	188.25
Oct 3-5, 2019	(China) 2019 Shanghai Trophy	2	76.43	2	117.37	2	193.80
Oct 25-27, 2019	2019 Skate Canada	4	76.67	3	118.68	3	195.35
Nov 22-24, 2019	(Japan) 2019 NHK Trophy	4	76.09	3	116.92	4	193.01
Nov 28-Dec 1, 2019	(United Kingdom) 2020 British Championships	1	70.37	1	125.33	1	195.70
Jan 20-26, 2020	(Austria) 2020 European Championships	6	74.26	5	118.08	5	192.34

Results in the 2020-21 season
Date	Event	SP		FS		Total	
Date	Event	P	Score	P	Score	P	Score
Mar 22-28, 2021	(Sweden) 2021 World Championships	8	77.42	7	119.50	7	196.92

Results in the 2021-22 season
Date	Event	SP		FS		Total	
Date	Event	P	Score	P	Score	P	Score
Oct 7-10, 2021	(Finland) 2021 CS Finlandia Trophy	4	74.78	3	115.61	3	190.39
Oct 29-31, 2021	2021 Skate Canada	5	71.89	7	106.19	7	178.08
Nov 12-14, 2021	(Japan) 2021 NHK Trophy	3	76.43	3	115.48	3	191.91
Nov 24-28, 2021	(Spain) 2021 Open d'Andorra	1	73.93	1	116.66	1	190.59
Nov 30-Dec 5, 2021	(United Kingdom) 2022 British Championships	1	79.62	1	121.22	1	200.84
Jan 10-16, 2022	(Estonia) 2022 European Championships	4	79.97	6	116.04	5	196.01
Feb 7-20, 2022	(China) 2022 Winter Olympics	10	76.45	9	115.19	10	191.64
Mar 21-27, 2022	(France) 2022 World Championships	7	78.89	6	119.28	6	198.17

Results in the 2022-23 season
Date	Event	SP		FS		Total	
Date	Event	P	Score	P	Score	P	Score
Aug 26-28, 2022	(United Kingdom) 2022 Britannia Cup	1	78.31	1	118.23	1	196.53
Sept 12-15, 2022	(United States) 2022 CS US International Classic	1	77.22	1	113.58	1	190.80\
Sept 21-24, 2022	(Germany) 2022 CS Nebelhorn Trophy	1	85.80	1	120.80	1	206.60
Oct 28-30, 2022	2022 Skate Canada	2	83.80	2	125.38	2	209.18
Nov 11-13, 2022	(United Kingdom) 2022 MK John Wilson Trophy	2	85.37	2	120.19	2	205.56
Dec 1-4, 2022	(United Kingdom) 2023 British Championships	1	79.14	1	126.63	1	205.77
Dec 8-11, 2022	(Italy) 2022–23 Grand Prix Final	5	80.75	4	120.15	4	200.90
Jan 23-29, 2023	(Finland) 2023 European Championships	2	84.12	2	123.77	2	207.89
Mar 20-26, 2023	(Japan) 2023 World Championships	4	86.56	5	128.17	4	214.73

Results in the 2023-24 season
Date	Event	SP		FS		Total	
Date	Event	P	Score	P	Score	P	Score
Aug 23-25, 2023	(United Kingdom) GB August Qualifier	1	83.50	1	126.85	1	1210.34
Sept 20-23, 2023	(Germany) 2023 CS Nebelhorn Trophy	1	82.42	1	125.42	1	207.84
Sept 28-30, 2023	(Slovakia) 2023 CS Nepela Memorial	1	81.69	1	118.77	1	200.46
Oct 27-29, 2023	2023 Skate Canada	2	93.51	2	126.04	2	209.55
Nov 24-26, 2023	(Japan) 2023 NHK Trophy	2	94.93	1	130.26	1	215.19
Nov 27-Dec 3, 2023	(United Kingdom) 2024 British Championships	1	92.22	1	136.56	1	228.78
Dec 7-10, 2023	(China) 2023–24 Grand Prix Final	4	76.24	4	126.03	4	202.27
Jan 8-13, 2024	(Lithuania) 2024 European Championships	2	85.20	2	125.62	2	210.82
Mar 18-24, 2024	(Canada) 2024 World Championships	4	84.60	4	126.32	4	210.92

Results in the 2024–25 season
Date	Event	SP		FS		Total	
Date	Event	P	Score	P	Score	P	Score
Sep 19–21, 2024	(Germany) 2024 CS Nebelhorn Trophy	1	82.22	1	124.79	1	207.01
Oct 18–20, 2024	(United States) 2024 Skate America	1	83.56	2	122.82	1	206.38
Oct 25–27, 2024	(Slovakia) 2024 CS Nepela Memorial	1	85.10	1	125.55	1	210.65
Nov 15–17, 2024	(Finland) 2024 Finlandia Trophy	2	82.03	1	121.19	1	203.22
Nov 27 – Dec 1, 2024	(United Kingdom) 2025 British Championships	1	92.48	1	134.94	1	227.42
Dec 5–8, 2024	(France) 2024–25 Grand Prix Final	3	82.31	4	122.87	3	205.18
Jan 28 – Feb 2, 2025	(Estonia) 2025 European Championships	3	81.57	2	124.45	3	206.02
Mar 25–30, 2025	(United States) 2025 World Championships	3	83.86	6	123.25	3	207.11

Results in the 2025–26 season
Date	Event	SP		FS		Total	
Date	Event	P	Score	P	Score	P	Score
Sep 5–6, 2025	(United Kingdom) 2025 Bolero Cup	1	81.30	2	118.51	1	199.81
Sep 25-27, 2025	(Germany) 2025 CS Nebelhorn Trophy	1	78.87	1	122.64	1	201.51
Oct 17–19, 2025	2025 Grand Prix de France	1	84.38	2	125.86	2	210.24
Nov 7-9, 2025	(Japan) 2025 NHK Trophy	1	81.57	1	124.31	1	205.88
Nov 26–30, 2025	(United Kingdom) 2026 British Championships	1	86.24	1	124.86	1	211.10
Dec 4–7, 2025	(Japan) 2025–26 Grand Prix Final	4	82.55	3	126.26	3	208.81
Jan 13–18, 2026	(United Kingdom) 2026 European Championships	2	85.47	3	124.04	3	209.51
Feb 6–8, 2026	(Italy) 2026 Winter Olympics – Team event	3	86.85	-	-	9	-
Feb 6–19, 2026	(Italy) 2026 Winter Olympics	4	85.47	12	118.85	7	204.32
Mar 24–29, 2026	(Czech Republic) 2026 World Championships	3	85.09	5	123.89	4	208.98

Results in the 2026-27 season
Date	Event	SP		FS		Total	
Date	Event	P	Score	P	Score	P	Score
Sep 3–4, 2026	(United Kingdom) Bolero Cup	1	79.91	1	110.29	1	190.20
Oct 30 - Nov 1, 2026	2026 Skate Canada International	1	81.37	1	119.80	1	201.17
Nov 6–8, 2026	2026 Cup of China	1	80.00	1	114.93	1	194.93
