= Nikolaj Sørensen =

Danish-Canadian ice dancer

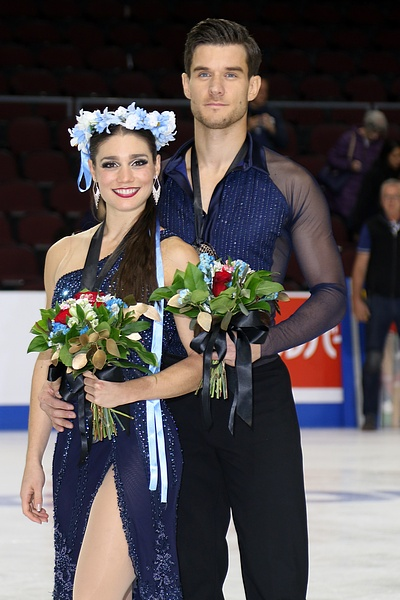
- Fournier Beaudry and Sørensen at the 2019 Skate America

Personal information
- Full name: Nikolaj Sørensen
- Other names: Soerensen
- Born: February 18, 1989 (age 37) Copenhagen, Denmark
- Home town: Montreal, Quebec
- Height: 1.84 m (6 ft 0 in)

Figure skating career
- Country: Canada (since 2018); Denmark (2004–18)
- Discipline: Ice Dance
- Partner: Laurence Fournier Beaudry (2013–24); Katelyn Good (2009–11); Barbora Heroldová (2007–08); Anne Thomsen (2004–07)
- Coach: Marie-France Dubreuil; Patrice Lauzon; Romain Haguenauer
- Skating club: Town of Mount Royal Figure Skating Club, Montreal
- Began skating: 1996
- Highest WS: 7th (2021–22)
Representing Canada
Four Continents Championships
Silver medal – second place	2023 Colorado Springs	Ice dance
Silver medal – second place	2024 Shanghai	Ice dance
Canadian Championships
Gold medal – first place	2023 Oshawa	Ice dance
Silver medal – second place	2022 Ottawa	Ice dance
Bronze medal – third place	2019 Saint John	Ice dance
Representing Denmark
Danish Championships
Gold medal – first place	2010 Rødovre	Ice dance
Gold medal – first place	2014 Herlev	Ice dance
Gold medal – first place	2015 Herning	Ice dance
Gold medal – first place	2018 Hørsholm	Ice dance

Nikolaj Sørensen (born February 18, 1989) is a Danish-Canadian ice dancer. Most recently competing for Canada with Laurence Fournier Beaudry, he is a two-time Four Continents silver medalist, an eight-time Grand Prix medallist (including gold at the 2022 NHK Trophy), a five-time Challenger medallist (including gold at the 2019 CS Nebelhorn Trophy and 2022 CS Finlandia Trophy), and the 2023 Canadian national champion. Fournier Beaudry and Sørensen represented Canada at the 2022 Winter Olympics.

Fournier Beaudry and Sørensen previously competed for Denmark, winning six ISU Challenger Series medals and representing Denmark at the World and European championships. In March 2018, Denmark released them to compete for Canada after Laurence was unable to obtain Danish citizenship to compete at the 2018 Winter Olympics.

In the autumn of 2023, Sørensen was investigated for the alleged sexual assault of an American figure skating coach and former skater in 2012 in the United States. In October 2024, Skate Canada gave him an indefinite ban of at least six years for "sexual maltreatment" as a result of the findings of the Office of the Sport Integrity Commissioner. This was overturned on appeal in June 2025 on jurisdictional grounds.

== Personal life ==
Sørensen was born on February 18, 1989, in Copenhagen, Denmark.

He became a Canadian citizen in September 2021. Sørensen is fluent in Danish, English, and French.

He is in a relationship with his former ice dance partner, Laurence Fournier Beaudry.

== Early career ==
Sørensen began learning to skate in 1996 at his father's instigation. He competed internationally with Anne Thomsen beginning in 2003. They placed twenty-fourth at the 2006 World Junior Championships.

In 2007, Sørensen teamed up with Czech skater Barbora Heroldová to compete for Denmark. They competed one season together, placing twenty-first at the 2008 World Junior Championships.

In 2009, Sørensen began competing with Canadian skater Katelyn Good for Denmark. In their first season together, they won the Danish senior national title, placed seventeenth at 2010 World Junior Championships, twenty-first at the 2010 European Championships, and twenty-fourth at the 2010 World Championships. The following season, they decided to move from training in the United States under Mathew Gates to Montreal to be near Good's mother. On Gates' recommendation, they began training under Marie-France Dubreuil and Patrice Lauzon, whose just-opened ice dance academy had only four teams at the time. Shortly after the move, Good's mother died. Sørensen and Good placed twenty-ninth at the 2011 World Championships in their final performance together, as Good chose to retire due to injury.

In 2012, Sørensen began skating with Canadian skater Vanessa Crone, but she decided not to compete with him.

== Partnership with Fournier Beaudry ==
Sørensen had a tryout with another Canadian, Laurence Fournier Beaudry of Quebec, in February 2012. He decided to team up with Crone but called Fournier Beaudry five months later, shortly after Crone's decision not to compete with him. Fournier Beaudry and Sørensen decided to represent Denmark while continuing to train in Canada under Dubreuil and Lauzon.

=== 2013–2014 season ===
Making their international competition debut in the fall of 2013, they won gold at the 2013 Pavel Roman Memorial, silver at the 2013 Ice Challenge, and bronze at the Toruń Cup. At the 2014 Danish Championships, they were the only competitors in ice dance.

In their ISU Championship debut, they placed thirteenth at the 2014 European Championships and concluded the season placing twenty-ninth at the 2014 World Championships in Saitama.

=== 2014–2015 season ===
The duo competed in three ISU Challenger Series events at the beginning of the season, placing fourth at the Volvo Open Cup, repeating as silver medallists at the Ice Challenge, and earning a bronze medal at the 2014 Autumn Classic. They were again the only competitors at the Danish Championships' ice dance event.

They placed ninth at their second European Championships. At the 2015 World Championships in Shanghai, they placed eleventh.

=== 2015–2016 season ===
Beginning the season again on the Challenger Series, Fournier Beaudry and Sørensen won the silver medal at the 2015 U.S. International Classic and the bronze medal at the Finlandia Trophy. Making their Grand Prix debut, they placed seventh at the 2015 Skate Canada International.

Fournier Beaudry and Sørensen placed ninth at Europeans for the second consecutive year and finished with a thirteenth-place finish at the 2016 World Championships in Boston.

=== 2016–2017 season ===
On the Challenger Series, Fournier Beaudry and Sørensen won their second bronze medal at the Autumn Classic International, and placed fourth at the Finlandia Trophy. Given two Grand Prix assignments, they placed seventh at both Skate Canada International and the Rostelecom Cup.

The duo placed seventh at Europeans. They went on to place thirteenth at the 2017 World Championships in Helsinki, Finland. Due to their result, Denmark qualified a spot in the ice dancing event at the 2018 Winter Olympics in Pyeongchang, South Korea.

=== 2017–2018 season ===
They took part in three Challenger Series events, placing fourth at the 2015 U.S. International Classic, seventh at the Autumn Classic International, and winning a second bronze medal at the Finlandia Trophy. At their sole Grand Prix event for the season, the 2017 NHK Trophy, Fournier Beaudry and Sørensen placed fifth. Appearing at their third and final Danish Championships, they were again the only competitors in senior ice dance.

Fournier Beaudry's citizenship status had dogged the team for much of the preceding years, as Danish law required seven years' residency for naturalization, and ultimately no allowance could be made. As a result, they could not participate in the Olympics despite having qualified for a spot there. Following the 2018 European Championships, where they placed ninth, the two reassessed their options and decided to switch countries and compete for Canada. In March 2018, Denmark released them for that purpose. Speaking of the challenges later, Sørensen remarked that they had been welcomed by the Canadian federation and that the Danish federation had always been supportive of his years of training in Canada had already made him as much Canadian as Danish and stated that he hoped to acquire Canadian citizenship by 2020.

=== 2018–2019 season ===
Fournier Beaudry chose Adiós Nonino for the rhythm dance, creating a cut of different instrumental and lyrical versions. She and Sørensen opted to retain their free program from the previous season, revised for the ISU's new rules. Sørensen remarked that it "is a transitional year with a lot of new feelings and a lot of new challenges, so it was natural to keep something familiar around." ISU rules required that a team switching countries sit out international competition for a year from their last international appearance, meaning they were ineligible for the Challenger and Grand Prix series.

In their first competition of the season, the 2019 Skate Canada Challenge, the duo placed first in both programs, qualifying for the 2019 Canadian Championships. At the Canadian Championships, they placed third and were named to the team for the 2019 Four Continents Championships and 2019 World Championships. They placed sixth at Four Continents, and tenth at the World Championships.

=== 2019–2020 season ===
Fournier Beaudry/Sørensen won the silver medal for their first event of the season at the Lombardia Trophy. They followed this with a gold medal at the Nebelhorn Trophy, their first Challenger title, increasing their personal best score by over ten points. Returning to the Grand Prix after a season away, they placed third in the rhythm dance at the 2019 Skate America, becoming one of the first teams to earn a perfect Level 4 on the Finnstep pattern dance. They also placed third in the free dance, winning the bronze medal. Sørensen called their first Grand Prix medal "something that we've dreamed about since we started skating together." At their second event, the 2019 Cup of China, they were again third in the rhythm dance and the only team at the event to earn a Level 4 on the Finnstep. Third as well in the free dance, despite some minor issues resulting in a lower score than at previous events, they won their second Grand Prix bronze. Sørensen explained afterwards that a knee injury had caused him to miss a week of training in between events.

Fournier Beaudry/Sørensen did not compete at the 2020 Canadian Championships due to the latter undergoing a cartilage graft and a meniscectomy to repair his knee. On February 13, 2020, Skate Canada announced that they had been assigned to compete at the 2020 World Championships. On March 6, 2020, they withdrew from the World Championships due to Sørensen's incomplete recovery; the championships themselves were cancelled five days later.

=== 2020–2021 season ===
Fournier Beaudry/Sørensen were assigned to the 2020 Skate Canada International, but the event was cancelled as a result of the coronavirus pandemic.

With the pandemic continuing to make in-person competitions difficult, Fournier Beaudry/Sørensen competed at virtual domestic competitions, winning the Quebec Sectionals and then taking the silver medal at the 2021 Skate Canada Challenge. The 2021 Canadian Championships were subsequently cancelled.

On February 21, Fournier Beaudry and Sørensen were announced as part of the Canadian team to the 2021 World Championships in Stockholm. They placed seventh in the rhythm dance despite getting only one of the four key points on the Finnstep pattern. In the free dance, they dropped to eighth place behind the British team Fear/Gibson by 0.04 points. Sørensen acknowledged afterwards having "left a couple of points on the table." Their placement combined with Gilles/Poirier's bronze medal win qualified three berths for Canadian dance teams at the 2022 Winter Olympics.

=== 2021–2022 season ===
The team began the season at the 2021 CS Lombardia Trophy, winning the silver medal for the second time. Sørensen commented afterwards that it was "not the best free dance today" following twizzle errors from both, but that "we are just going to build from here." Going onto their first Grand Prix assignment of the year, 2021 Skate America, they placed third in the rhythm dance. Fourth in the free dance, dropping behind Spaniards Smart/Díaz in that segment, they remained in the bronze medal position overall by 0.44 points. Reflecting on "our third grand prix for Canada with a bronze medal", Fournier Beaudry called it "so nice to be back after two years of struggle and feeling like the machine is rolling and the bodies are rolling again." After winning another Challenger silver at the 2021 CS Cup of Austria, the following week, they won another bronze medal at their second Grand Prix assignment, the 2021 Rostelecom Cup.

At the 2022 Canadian Championships, held without an audience in Ottawa due to the pandemic, Fournier Beaudry/Sørensen placed second in both segments of the competition to take the silver medal. They debuted a new free dance rechoreographed to Hans Zimmer and Lisa Gerrard's score to Gladiator, a decision made three weeks prior. Sørensen said the original program "was an idea we came up with when we were off the ice, and we were trying to navigate the beginning of this pandemic. So you know, feelings change, and what we thought we needed changed during this season." The following day, they were named to the Canadian Olympic team. Speaking on the occasion to Danish TV 2, Sørensen reflected "it's a shame that we could not compete for Denmark, because we have never been to the Olympics in ice dancing. I often think the small countries are underrepresented in a sport like ice dancing."

Competing at the dance event at the 2022 Winter Olympics, Fournier Beaudry/Sørensen placed eighth in the rhythm dance. A twizzle error by Sørensen caused them to place eleventh in the free dance, dropping them to ninth overall. They went on to finish the season at the 2022 World Championships in Montpellier, held with the Russian dance teams absent due to the International Skating Union banning all Russian athletes due to their country's invasion of Ukraine. Sørensen struggled with a back injury during the competition, which caused problems in the free dance when their closing lift was aborted, dropping them from eighth to ninth place. He said, "it's unfortunate, but it happens."

=== 2022–2023 season ===
For their free dance in the new season, Fournier Beaudry and Sørensen conceived of a program utilizing two styles of flamenco, inspired by pieces of Ennio Morricone's music used in the soundtrack for Kill Bill. The idea was said to have come to their coach, Marie-France Dubreuil, in the process of doing her laundry. They opened the season with a win at the 2022 CS Finlandia Trophy, their second ever Challenger gold medal. Sørensen said that their focus in training had been on "redeeming ourselves after how we finished last season," calling this a positive step in that direction. They set new personal bests at the event, breaking the 120-point mark in the free dance for the first time.

On the Grand Prix, the team was first assigned to the 2022 Grand Prix de France, where they won the silver medal, their first of that colour on the circuit. They set a new personal best in the rhythm dance for the second consecutive event. Fournier Beaudry said that "we have high aspirations, and we want to go to the Grand Prix Final, so we are one step closer to our goal for this season." The team's second event was the 2022 NHK Trophy in Sapporo, where they went in considered likely to repeat their silver medal result. However, they finished first in the rhythm dance with a new personal best score of 85.66, 0.66 points ahead of pre-event favourites and training partners Chock/Bates of the United States. They won the free dance as well, setting another set of personal bests, to take the gold medal over Chock/Bates and qualify for the Grand Prix Final. Fournier Beaudry called it "a dream come true and something we have worked for for a very long time," while Sørensen added, "thinking back and getting to where we are right now is just amazing."

Fournier Beaudry/Sørensen finished fourth in the rhythm dance at the Grand Prix Final in Turin, 1.39 points back of third-place Guignard/Fabbri of Italy. However, they made a major error in the free dance, falling out of their curve in the process of altering the position, resulting in the element being graded at only base level and two points lost in fall deductions. They finished sixth of six teams in that segment and dropped narrowly to sixth overall. Sørensen attributed the mistake to "lack of concentration."

With reigning Canadian national (and Grand Prix Final) champions Gilles/Poirier absent from the 2023 Canadian Championships due to Gilles requiring an appendectomy, Fournier Beaudry/Sørensen entered the event as the title favourites. They finished first in the rhythm dance despite a twizzle error from Sørensen, 2.15 points ahead of training partners Lajoie/Lagha. In the free dance, Fournier Beaudry tripped on her skirt in the midst of their choreographic slide move at the end of the program, costing them that element. They finished second in the free dance, but remained first overall by 0.60 points and won the gold medal. He called the championships "a really good time," despite the error.

Fournier Beaudry/Sørensen were the top Canadian dance team assigned to the 2023 Four Continents Championships, with Gilles/Poirier still absent. Fournier Beaudry sustained an MCL tear the week before the event, but with careful management they were able to attend the event. They placed second in the rhythm dance with a personal best 86.28, unexpectedly close to Chock/Bates in first with 87.67. In the free dance they set another new personal best of 127.80, finishing second in that segment as well and winning the silver medal. Sørensen said they were "so pleased winning our first championship medal of our entire career. It is our eleventh year skating together."

At the 2023 World Championships in Saitama, Fournier Beaudry/Sørensen were fifth in the rhythm dance. They placed fourth in the free dance, but remained in fifth place overall, 0.69 points behind Britons Fear/Gibson. Sørensen remarked that "we couldn't have asked for anything more."

=== 2023–2024 season ===
With the World Championships being held in Montreal, in replacement for the cancelled 2020 edition, Fournier Beaudry and Sørensen opted for a free dance to the Franco-Canadian musical Notre-Dame de Paris, citing the involvement of prominent Quebecois Luc Plamondon and Gilles Maheu. For the 1980s-themed rhythm dance, they took the opportunity to do a Top Gun program, a concept they had been contemplating for some time.

Fournier Beaudry/Sørensen began the season at the 2023 CS Finlandia Trophy, seeking to defend their gold medal from the prior season. Seventh in the rhythm dance after Fournier Beaudry fell, they won the free dance and rose to the bronze medal position. Returning to the Grand Prix de France to start the Grand Prix, they won the silver medal. The podium of gold medalists Guignard/Fabbri, silver medalists Fournier Beaudry/Sørensen, and bronze medalists Lopareva/Brissaud was the same as the previous year. They won another silver medal at the 2023 Grand Prix of Espoo. They finished fifth at the Grand Prix Final.

Days before the 2024 Canadian Championships, American journalist Christine Brennan reported in USA Today that Sørensen was under investigation by the Canada's Sport Integrity Commissioner following an allegation that he had sexually assaulted an American skater on April 21, 2012. Amidst this controversy, Fournier Beaudry and Sørensen withdrew from the championships. He released a statement saying that the "allegations are false, and I intend to strongly defend myself and my reputation."

Despite the controversy, the pair competed as previously scheduled at the 2024 Four Continents Championships in Shanghai, winning their second consecutive silver medal. They were also assigned to the home 2024 World Championships, which attracted further media attention in light of the allegations. Sørensen declared "we're here today because we feel like we deserve to be here." They encountered difficulties in the rhythm dance after Fournier Beaudry had a twizzle error, and came tenth in the segment. They finished sixth in the free dance, but rose only to ninth overall. Fournier Beaudry called the crowd reception "really fantastic."

=== Suspension by Skate Canada ===
Fournier Beaudry/Sørensen were assigned to compete at the 2024 Skate America and 2024 NHK Trophy ahead of the 2024–25 season, and planned to open their season at the 2024 Shanghai Trophy in October. However, on 2 October 2024, it was announced that Sørensen had been banned by Skate Canada for a minimum of six years due to "sexual maltreatment" following an Office of the Sport Integrity Commissioner investigation into the allegations lodged against him earlier that year. The alleged assault took place after a party in 2012 in Hartford, Connecticut, when the victim was 22 and Sørensen was 23.

On 19 June 2025, the suspension was overturned by the Sport Dispute Resolution Centre of Canada on jurisdictional grounds and Skate Canada lifted its sanctions. Sørensen argued that since he was neither a Canadian citizen nor a skater for Canada at the time of the incident, he did not consent to be retroactively bound by the Canadian code of conduct for sports. An arbiter ruled that the Director of Sanctions and Outcomes, the authority to impose sanctions on athletes, did not have the jurisdiction to investigate the alleged attack. The allegation has still not been tested in a formal court of law. In May 2026, Ashley Foy, a former ice dancer and current coach in the Netherlands, came out publicly as the victim stating, "I don't care care what professional retaliation I face anymore. I can't bear to face another person talking about this case to me not knowing I'm the victim." The decision is still being argued by the Sport Dispute Resolution Centre of Canada as of May 2026. On August 7, 2026 Skate Canada placed Sorensen under Interim Suspension. The end of the suspension is not determined yet as of September 20, 2026.

== Programs ==
Season	Short dance	Free dance	Exhibition
2023–2024	Top Gun Anthem by Harold Faltermeyer, Steve Stevens; Playing with the Boys by Kenny Loggins; Take My Breath Away by Berlin; Hot Summer Nights by Miami Sound Machine; Danger Zone by Kenny Loggins (from Top Gun) choreo. by Marie-France Dubreuil, Romain Haguenauer, Ginette Cournoyer, Samuel Chouinard	Danse mon Esmeralda (from Notre-Dame de Paris) performed by Mario Pelchat; Final Angelus Bells by Monks Of The Abbey Of Notre Dame; Ave Maria Paien performed by Noa; Les Sans-Papiers performed by Cirque du Soleil, Jean-Phi Goncalves, Marie-Josée Lord; Danse mon Esmeralda performed by Garou (from Notre-Dame de Paris) by Luc Plamondon, Riccardo Cocciante choreo. by Marie-France Dubreuil, Romain Haguenauer, Ginette Cournoyer, Samuel Chouinard	Il mercenario; L'arena; Libertà (from Il mercenario); The Verdict (Dopo la condanna) (from The Big Gundown) by Ennio Morricone; El Mariachi; Guitar Town (from Once Upon a Time in Mexico) by Robert Rodriguez; Malagueña Salerosa by Marco de Lahuén, Chingon choreo. by Marie-France Dubreuil, Ginette Cournoyer, Samuel Chouinard
2022–2023	Rhumba: Con Los Años Que Me Quedan; Rhumba: Rhythm Is Gonna Get You; Rhumba: Conga by Gloria Estefan choreo. by Marie-France Dubreuil, Ginette Cournoyer, Samuel Chouinard	Il mercenario; L'arena; Libertà (from Il mercenario); The Verdict (Dopo la condanna) (from The Big Gundown) by Ennio Morricone; El Mariachi; Guitar Town (from Once Upon a Time in Mexico) by Robert Rodriguez; Malagueña Salerosa by Marco de Lahuén, Chingon choreo. by Marie-France Dubreuil, Ginette Cournoyer, Samuel Chouinard	Amsterdam: The Pact/The Murder by Daniel Pemberton; Time by Giveon
2021–2022	Blues: Careless Whisper; Funk: I Want Your Sex; Funk: Freedom! '90 by George Michael; Funk: Freedom! '90 by The Hyannis Sound choreo. by Marie-France Dubreuil, Ginette Cournoyer, Samuel Chouinard	The Wheat; The Battle; Homecoming; Elysium; Now We Are Free (from Gladiator) by Hans Zimmer, Lisa Gerrard choreo. by Marie-France Dubreuil, Ginette Cournoyer, Scott Moir; A Call to Prayer by Zola Dubnikova (Estas Tonne & One Heart Family); The Last Kingdom by Eivør Pálsdóttir, John Lunn; Skogsraah by Glen Gabriel; ROOTS - The Return to the Inner Temple by Zola Dubnikova & Estas Tonne; My England by John Lunn, Eivør choreo. by Scott Moir, Marie-France Dubreuil, Ginette Cournoyer	You Are the Reason by Calum Scott, Leona Lewis
2020–2021	Slow Foxtrot: Bonnie; Quickstep: This World Will Remember Us (from Bonnie & Clyde) by Frank Wildhorn, Don Black performed by Jeremy Jordan, Laura Osnes choreo. by Marie-France Dubreuil, Patrice Lauzon, Samuel Chouinard	A Call to Prayer by Zola Dubnikova (Estas Tonne & One Heart Family); The Last Kingdom by Eivør Pálsdóttir, John Lunn; Skogsraah by Glen Gabriel; ROOTS - The Return to the Inner Temple by Zola Dubnikova & Estas Tonne choreo. by Scott Moir, Marie-France Dubreuil, Ginette Cournoyer	
2019–2020	Blues: Raise A Little Hell; Slow Foxtrot: Bonnie; Quickstep: This World Will Remember Us (from Bonnie & Clyde) by Frank Wildhorn, Don Black performed by Jeremy Jordan, Laura Osnes choreo. by Marie-France Dubreuil, Patrice Lauzon, Samuel Chouinard	Summertime by George Gershwin, DuBose Heyward, Ira Gershwin performed by Chris Botti, David Foster; Georgia on My Mind by Hoagy Carmichael, Stuart Gorrell; Cry Me A River by Arthur Hamilton performed by Michael Bublé choreo. by Marie-France Dubreuil, Patrice Lauzon, Samuel Chouinard	
2018–2019	Tango: Balada para mi muerte; Tango: Adiós Nonino by Astor Piazzolla	Spanish Caravan by The Doors; Hush; Asturias performed by Marcin Patrzalek	You Are the Reason by Calum Scott, Leona Lewis
2017–2018	Slow Rhumba: Search for Vulcan from Thunderball by John Barry; Cha Cha: Whatever Lola Wants performed by Carmen McRae; Rhumba: Whatever Lola Wants performed by Les Baxter; Mambo: Peter Gunn Mambo by Jack Costanzo	Spanish Caravan by The Doors; Hush; Asturias performed by Marcin Patrzalek	
2016–2017	You're the Boss performed by Elvis Presley, Ann-Margret; A Little Less Conversation performed by Elvis Presley	La Vie en rose by Édith Piaf	Lay Me Down by Sam Smith
2015–2016	Waltz: Never Tear Us Apart by INXS; March: Karl van de Kerckhove music	Woman by Shawn Phillips	
2014–2015	Flamenco: Malagueña performed by Montana Skies; Paso doble: Malagueña performed by Klaus Hallen Dance Orchestra	The Summer Knows by Frank Sinatra; Summer of '42 (special composition) by Karl Hugo van Kerckhove; Summer Me, Winter Me by Frank Sinatra	
2013–2014	Foxtrot: All Of Me; Quickstep: I Never Knew; Foxtrot: All Of Me by Frank Sinatra	Wall Flower; In Your Eyes by Peter Gabriel	

=== With Good ===
Season	Short dance	Free dance
2010–2011	Padam Padam by Édith Piaf; C'est si bon by Eartha Kitt	La Del Ruso; Amor Perteno; Peligro; Differente by Gotan Project
2009–2010	Danish folk dance: Waltz; Polka	Les Misérables by Claude-Michel Schönberg

=== With Heroldová ===
Season	Original dance	Free dance
2007–2008	Danish folk dance: Mikalas Vals (from Lige for Tiden 2) by Janet Vahl; Dug-Kalo (from Lige for Tiden) by H. Haugaard, J. V. Petersen	St. Patrick (Angelus); The Vikings; Celtic Kittens by Ronan Hardiman

=== With Thomsen ===
Season	Original dance	Free dance
2006–2007	Felino (from Electrocutang) by Sverre Indris Jones; Santa Maria (from Shall We Dance) by Gotan Project	The Addams Family by Marc Shaiman
2005–2006	Cha cha: Sway (from Shall We Dance?); Rhumba: Perfidia (from Shall We Dance?); Cha cha: Mujer Latina (The Latin Challenge)	Harem by Frederico de Brito
2004–2005	Slow foxtrot: Do Nothin' Till you Hear from Me by Duke Ellington, Bob Russel; Charleston: The Muppet Show Theme	Dance with Me; Eres Todo En Mi; Echa Pa' Lante; Tres Deseos

== Competitive highlights ==
- GP – Event of the ISU Grand Prix Series
- JGP – Event of the ISU Junior Grand Prix Series
- CS – Event of the ISU Challenger Series
- WD – Withdrew from competition
- C – Event was cancelled

=== Ice dance with Laurence Fournier Beaudry (for Canada) ===
Competition placements at senior level
Season	2018–19	2019–20	2020–21	2021–22	2022–23	2023–24
Winter Olympics				9th		
World Championships	10th		8th	9th	5th	9th
Four Continents Championships	6th				2nd	2nd
Grand Prix Final					6th	5th
Canadian Championships	3rd			2nd	1st	
GP Cup of China		3rd				
GP Finland						2nd
GP France					2nd	2nd
GP NHK Trophy					1st	
GP Rostelecom Cup				3rd		
GP Skate America		3rd		3rd		
CS Cup of Austria				2nd		
CS Finlandia Trophy					1st	3rd
CS Lombardia Trophy		2nd		2nd		
CS Nebelhorn Trophy		1st				
Skate Canada Challenge	1st		2nd			

=== Ice dance with Laurence Fournier Beaudry (for Denmark) ===
Competition placements at senior level
Season	2013–14	2014–15	2015–16	2016–17	2017–18
World Championships	29th	11th	13th	13th	
European Championships	18th	9th	9th	7th	9th
Danish Championships	1st	1st			1st
GP France			5th		
GP NHK Trophy					5th
GP Rostelecom Cup				7th	
GP Skate Canada			7th	7th	
CS Autumn Classic		3rd		3rd	7th
CS Finlandia Trophy			3rd	4th	3rd
CS Ice Challenge	2nd	2nd			
CS U.S. Classic			2nd		4th
CS Volvo Open Cup		4th			
Mentor Toruń Cup	3rd				
Pavel Roman Memorial	1st				

=== Ice dance with Katelyn Good (for Denmark) ===
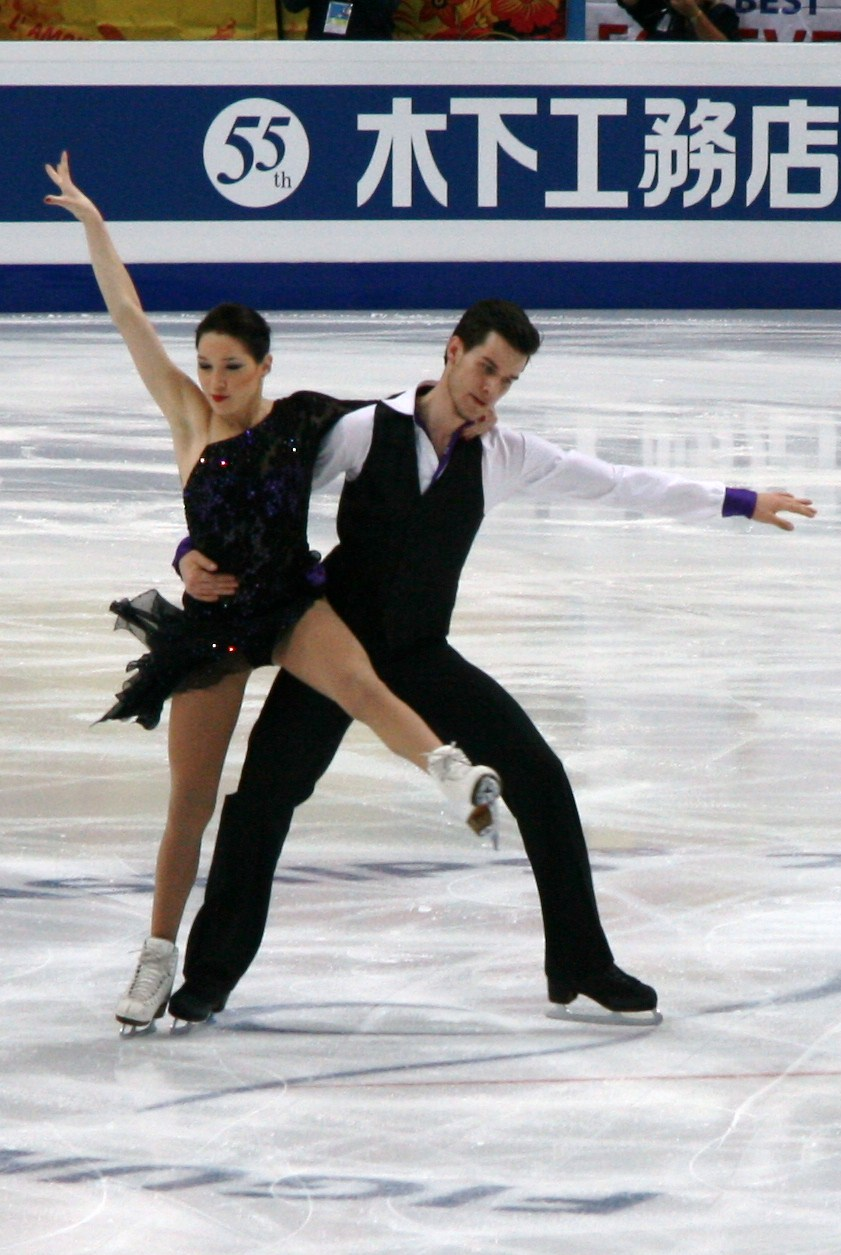
Good and Sørensen at the 2011 World Championships

Competition placements at senior level
Season	2009–10	2010–11
World Championships	24th	26th
European Championships	21st	
Danish Championships	1st	
Cup of Nice	WD	
Finlandia Trophy		9th
Nebelhorn Trophy		14th

Competition placements at junior level
Season	2009–10
World Junior Championships	17th
JGP Turkey	12th
JGP United States	9th

=== Ice dance with Barbora Heroldová (for Denmark) ===
Competition placements at junior level
Season	2007–08
World Junior Championships	21st
Danish Championships	1st
JGP Austria	14th
JGP Great Britain	17th
Pavel Roman Memorial	11th

=== Ice dance with Anna Thomsen (for Denmark) ===
Competition placements at junior level
Season	2004–05	2005–06	2006–07
World Junior Championships		24th	
JGP Bulgaria		14th	
JGP Czech Republic			13th
JGP Germany	15th		
JGP Poland		15th	
Nordic Championships		1st	
Pavel Roman Memorial	8th	9th	

== Detailed results ==
=== With Fournier Beaudry for Canada ===
Small medals for short and free programs awarded only at ISU Championships. At team events, medals awarded for team results only. Current ISU personal bests highlighted in bold.

**2023–2024 season**
Date	Event	RD	FD	Total
March 18–24, 2024	2024 World Championships	10; 75.79	6; 124.12	9; 199.91
Jan. 30 – Feb. 4, 2024	2024 Four Continents Championships	2; 82.02	2; 125.52	2; 207.54
December 7–10, 2023	2023–24 Grand Prix Final	5; 74.82	5; 120.75	5; 195.57
November 17–19, 2023	2023 Grand Prix of Espoo	2; 82.62	2; 123.70	2; 206.32
November 3–5, 2023	2023 Grand Prix de France	2; 80.98	2; 124.17	2; 205.15
October 4–8, 2023	2023 CS Finlandia Trophy	7; 67.67	1; 120.89	3; 188.56
**2022–23 season**
Date	Event	RD	FD	Total
March 22–26, 2023	2023 World Championships	5; 85.59	4; **128.45**	5; 214.04
February 7–12, 2023	2023 Four Continents Championships	2; **86.28**	2; 127.80	2; **214.08**
January 9–15, 2023	2023 Canadian Championships	1; 87.06	2; 125.34	1; 212.40
December 8–11, 2022	2022–23 Grand Prix Final	4; 83.16	6; 112.99	6; 196.15
November 18–20, 2022	2022 NHK Trophy	1; 85.66	1; 124.75	1; 210.41
November 4–6, 2022	2022 Grand Prix de France	2; 82.38	2; 119.55	2; 201.93
October 4–9, 2022	2022 CS Finlandia Trophy	1; 81.83	1; 121.93	1; 203.76
**2021–22 season**
Date	Event	RD	FD	Total
March 21–27, 2022	2022 World Championships	8; 78.29	9; 110.25	9; 188.54
February 12–14, 2022	2022 Winter Olympics	8; 78.54	11; 113.81	9; 192.35
January 6–12, 2022	2022 Canadian Championships	2; 81.04	2; 125.61	2; 206.65
November 26–28, 2021	2021 Rostelecom Cup	3; 76.39	3; 115.01	3; 191.40
November 11–14, 2021	2021 CS Cup of Austria	3; 77.38	2; 117.29	2; 194.67
October 22–24, 2021	2021 Skate America	3; 75.33	4; 114.80	3; 190.13
September 10–12, 2021	2021 CS Lombardia Trophy	2; 76.64	2; 108.62	2; 185.26
**2020–21 season**
Date	Event	RD	FD	Total
March 22–28, 2021	2021 World Championships	7; 77.87	8; 119.01	8; 196.88
January 8–17, 2021	2021 Skate Canada Challenge	2; 86.55	2; 120.36	2; 206.91
2019–20 season
Date	Event	RD	FD	Total
November 8–10, 2019	2019 Cup of China	3; 78.41	3; 112.33	3; 190.74
October 18–20, 2019	2019 Skate America	3; 79.17	3; 118.36	3; 197.53
September 25–28, 2019	2019 CS Nebelhorn Trophy	1; 81.16	1; 119.84	1; 201.00
September 13–15, 2019	2019 CS Lombardia Trophy	2; 79.11	2; 110.25	2; 189.36
2018–19 season
Date	Event	RD	FD	Total
March 18–24, 2019	2019 World Championships	10; 74.76	9; 113.34	10; 188.10
February 7–10, 2019	2019 Four Continents Championships	6; 73.70	6; 113.61	6; 186.91
January 13–20, 2019	2019 Canadian Championships	3; 79.41	3; 119.00	3; 198.41
