= Laurence Fournier Beaudry =

Canadian and French ice dancer (born 1992)

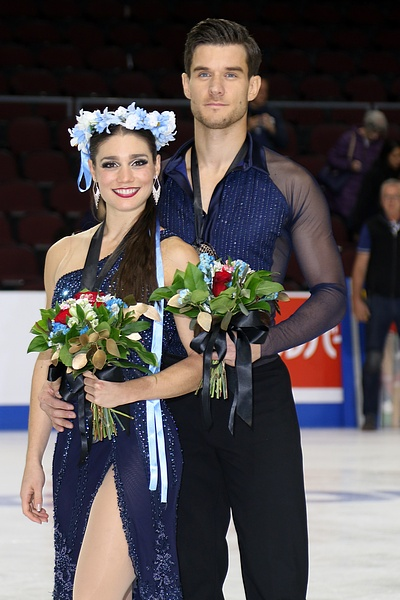
- Laurence Fournier Beaudry and Nikolaj Sørensen at the 2019 Skate America

Personal information
- Born: July 18, 1992 (age 34) Montreal, Quebec, Canada
- Height: 1.65 m (5 ft 5 in)

Figure skating career
- Country: France (2025–); Canada (2008–12; 2018–24); Denmark (2013–18)
- Discipline: Ice dance
- Partner: Guillaume Cizeron (since 2025); Nikolaj Sørensen (2013–24); Yoan Breton (2010–12); Anthony Quintal (2008–09)
- Coach: Marie-France Dubreuil; Patrice Lauzon; Romain Haguenauer
- Skating club: Town of Mount Royal Figure Skating Club, Montreal
- Began skating: 2001
- Highest WS: 7th (2021–22)
Event	Gold medal – first place	Silver medal – second place	Bronze medal – third place
Olympic Games	1	0	0
World Championships	1	0	0
European Championships	1	0	0
Four Continents Championships	0	2	0
Grand Prix Final	0	1	0
French Championships	1	0	0
Canadian Championships	1	1	1
Danish Championships	3	0	0
Medal list
representing France
Olympic Games
Gold medal – first place	2026 Milano Cortina	Ice dance
World Championships
Gold medal – first place	2026 Prague	Ice dance
European Championships
Gold medal – first place	2026 Sheffield	Ice dance
Grand Prix Final
Silver medal – second place	2025–26 Nagoya	Ice dance
French Championships
Gold medal – first place	2026 Briancon	Ice dance
Medal list
representing Canada
Four Continents Championships
Silver medal – second place	2023 Colorado Spring	Ice dance
Silver medal – second place	2024 Shanghai	Ice dance
Canadian Championships
Gold medal – first place	2023 Oshawa	Ice dance
Silver medal – second place	2022 Ottawa	Ice dance
Bronze medal – third place	2019 Saint John	Ice dance
Medal list
representing Denmark
Danish Championships
Gold medal – first place	2014 Herlev	Ice dance
Gold medal – first place	2015 Herning	Ice dance
Gold medal – first place	2018 Hørsholm	Ice dance

Laurence Fournier Beaudry (French pronunciation: [lɔʁɑ̃s fuʁnje boːdʁi]; born July 18, 1992) is a Canadian and French ice dancer. Representing France with partner Guillaume Cizeron, she is the 2026 Olympic champion, the 2026 World champion, the 2026 European champion, the 2025–26 Grand Prix Final silver medalist, a three-time Grand Prix champion, and the 2026 French national champion.

With former skating partner Nikolaj Sørensen, she is a two-time Four Continents silver medalist, an eight-time Grand Prix medallist (including gold at the 2022 NHK Trophy), a five-time Challenger medallist (including gold at the 2019 CS Nebelhorn Trophy and 2022 CS Finlandia Trophy), and the 2023 Canadian national champion. Fournier Beaudry and Sørensen represented Canada at the 2022 Winter Olympics.

Fournier Beaudry and Sørensen previously competed for Denmark, winning six ISU Challenger Series medals and representing Denmark at the World and European championships. In March 2018, Denmark released them to represent Canada after she was unable to obtain Danish citizenship to compete at the 2018 Winter Olympics.

== Personal life ==
Fournier Beaudry was born on July 18, 1992, in Montreal, Quebec. She is the daughter of Pierre Beaudry, bass trombonist at the Orchestre Symphonique de Montréal (OSM), and Anik Fournier. She is fluent in both English and French, and can also speak some Danish.

She is in a relationship with her former ice dance partner, Nikolaj Sørensen.

Fournier Beaudry's figure skating idol is Tessa Virtue.

== Career ==
=== Early career ===
Fournier Beaudry initially focused on gymnastics and began skating in 2001 at the age of nine after the urging of her parents, who were recreational skaters. Early in her career, she competed with Anthony Quintal. Together with Yoan Breton, she appeared on the ISU Junior Grand Prix series in 2011. Following that, Breton retired, having achieved his goal of competing internationally.

=== Partnership with Sørensen ===
Fournier Beaudry had a tryout with Danish ice dancer Nikolaj Sørensen in February 2012. He decided to team up with Vanessa Crone but called Fournier Beaudry five months later, shortly after Crone's decision not to compete with him.

Fournier Beaudry and Sørensen decided to represent Denmark while continuing to train under Marie-France Dubreuil and Patrice Lauzon in Montreal, Quebec.

==== 2013–2014 season: First Danish national title ====
Making their international competition debut in the fall of 2013, they won gold at the 2013 Pavel Roman Memorial, silver at the 2013 Ice Challenge, and bronze at the Toruń Cup. At the 2014 Danish Championships, they were the only competitors in ice dance.

In their ISU Championship debut, they placed thirteenth at the 2014 European Championships and concluded the season placing twenty-ninth at the 2014 World Championships in Saitama.

==== 2014–2015 season: Second Danish national title ====
The duo competed in three ISU Challenger Series events at the beginning of the season, placing fourth at the Volvo Open Cup, repeating as silver medallists at the Ice Challenge, and earning a bronze medal at the 2014 Autumn Classic. They were again the only competitors at the Danish Championships' ice dance event.

They placed ninth at their second European Championships. At the 2015 World Championships in Shanghai, they placed eleventh.

==== 2015–2016 season ====
Beginning the season again on the Challenger Series, Fournier Beaudry and Sørensen won the silver medal at the 2015 U.S. International Classic and the bronze medal at the Finlandia Trophy. Making their Grand Prix debut, they placed seventh at the 2015 Skate Canada International.

Fournier Beaudry and Sørensen placed ninth at Europeans for the second consecutive year and finished with a thirteenth-place finish at the 2016 World Championships in Boston.

==== 2016–2017 season ====
On the Challenger Series, Fournier Beaudry and Sørensen won their second bronze medal at the Autumn Classic International, and placed fourth at the Finlandia Trophy. Given two Grand Prix assignments, they placed seventh at both Skate Canada International and the Rostelecom Cup.

The duo placed seventh at Europeans. They went on to place thirteenth at the 2017 World Championships in Helsinki, Finland. Due to their result, Denmark qualified a spot in the ice dancing event at the 2018 Winter Olympics in Pyeongchang, South Korea.

==== 2017–2018 season: Third Danish national title ====
They took part in three Challenger Series events, placing fourth at the 2017 U.S. International Classic, seventh at the Autumn Classic International, and winning a second bronze medal at the Finlandia Trophy. At their sole Grand Prix event for the season, the 2017 NHK Trophy, Fournier Beaudry and Sørensen placed fifth. Appearing at their third and final Danish Championships, they were again the only competitors in senior ice dance.

Fournier Beaudry's citizenship status had dogged the team for much of the preceding years, as Danish law required seven years' residency for naturalization, and ultimately no allowance could be made. As a result, they could not participate in the Olympics despite having qualified for a spot there. Following the 2018 European Championships, where they placed ninth, the two reassessed their options and decided to switch countries and compete for Canada. In March 2018, Denmark released them for that purpose. Speaking of the challenges later, Fournier Beaudry remarked that they had been welcomed by Skate Canada and that the Danish federation had always been supportive.

==== 2018–2019 season: Switch to Canada ====
Fournier Beaudry chose Adiós Nonino for the rhythm dance, creating a cut of different instrumental and lyrical versions. She and Sørensen opted to retain their free program from the previous season, revised for the ISU's new rules because she felt "so much in love with that program. We felt it was growing so much, and we did not have the time to get it where we wanted it to be." ISU rules required that a team switching countries sit out international competition for a year from their last international appearance, meaning they were ineligible for the Challenger and Grand Prix series.

In their first competition of the season, the 2019 Skate Canada Challenge, the duo placed first in both programs, qualifying for the 2019 Canadian Championships. At the Canadian Championships, they placed third and were named to the team for the 2019 Four Continents Championships and 2019 World Championships. They placed sixth at Four Continents, and tenth at the World Championships.

==== 2019–2020 season: Grand Prix bronze medals ====
Fournier Beaudry/Sørensen won the silver medal for their first event of the season at the Lombardia Trophy. They followed this with a gold medal at the Nebelhorn Trophy, their first Challenger title, increasing their personal best score by over ten points. Returning to the Grand Prix after a season away, they placed third in the rhythm dance at the 2019 Skate America, becoming one of the first teams to earn a perfect Level 4 on the Finnstep pattern dance. They also placed third in the free dance, winning the bronze medal. Fournier Beaudry remarked on the occasion, "stepping onto that podium is everybody's dream, so to finally be able to do it in our first Grand Prix skating for Canada after not being on the circuit last year is just very exciting." At their second event, the 2019 Cup of China, they were again third in the rhythm dance and the only team at the event to earn a Level 4 on the Finnstep. Third as well in the free dance, despite some minor issues resulting in a lower score than at previous events, they won their second Grand Prix bronze. Sørensen explained afterwards that a knee injury had caused him to miss a week of training in between events.

Fournier Beaudry/Sørensen did not compete at the 2020 Canadian Championships due to the latter undergoing a cartilage graft and a meniscectomy to repair his knee. On February 13, 2020, Skate Canada announced that they had been assigned to compete at the 2020 World Championships. On March 6, 2020, they withdrew from the World Championships due to Sørensen's incomplete recovery; the championships themselves were cancelled five days later.

==== 2020–2021 season ====
Fournier Beaudry/Sørensen were assigned to the 2020 Skate Canada International, but the event was cancelled as a result of the coronavirus pandemic.

With the pandemic continuing to make in-person competitions difficult, Fournier Beaudry/Sørensen competed at virtual domestic competitions, winning the Quebec Sectionals and then taking the silver medal at the 2021 Skate Canada Challenge. The 2021 Canadian Championships were subsequently cancelled.

On February 25, Fournier Beaudry and Sørensen were announced as part of the Canadian team to the 2021 World Championships in Stockholm. They placed seventh in the rhythm dance despite getting only one of the four key points on the Finnstep pattern. In the free dance, they dropped to eighth place behind the British team Fear/Gibson by 0.04 points. Sørensen acknowledged afterwards having "left a couple of points on the table." Their placement combined with Gilles/Poirier's bronze medal win qualified three berths for Canadian dance teams at the 2022 Winter Olympics.

==== 2021–2022 season: Grand Prix bronze medals ====
The team began the season at the 2021 CS Lombardia Trophy, winning the silver medal for the second time. Going onto their first Grand Prix assignment of the year, 2021 Skate America, they placed third in the rhythm dance. Fourth in the free dance, dropping behind Spaniards Smart/Díaz in that segment, they remained in the bronze medal position overall by 0.44 points. After winning another Challenger silver at the 2021 CS Cup of Austria, the following week, they won another bronze medal at their second Grand Prix assignment, the 2021 Rostelecom Cup.

At the 2022 Canadian Championships, held without an audience in Ottawa due to the pandemic, Fournier Beaudry/Sørensen placed second in both segments of the competition to take the silver medal. They debuted a new free dance rechoreographed to Hans Zimmer and Lisa Gerrard's score to Gladiator, a decision made three weeks prior. The following day, they were named to the Canadian Olympic team.

Competing at the dance event at the 2022 Winter Olympics, Fournier Beaudry/Sørensen placed eighth in the rhythm dance. A twizzle error by Sørensen caused them to place eleventh in the free dance, dropping them to ninth overall. They went on to finish the season at the 2022 World Championships in Montpellier, held with the Russian dance teams absent due to the International Skating Union banning all Russian athletes due to their country's invasion of Ukraine.

==== 2022–2023 season: Canadian national title and Four Continents silver ====
For their free dance in the new season, Fournier Beaudry and Sørensen conceived of a program utilizing two styles of flamenco, inspired by pieces of Ennio Morricone's music used in the soundtrack for Kill Bill. The idea was said to have come to their coach, Marie-France Dubreuil, in the process of doing her laundry. They opened the season with a win at the 2022 CS Finlandia Trophy, their second ever Challenger gold medal. Sørensen said that their focus in training had been on "redeeming ourselves after how we finished last season," calling this a positive step in that direction. They set new personal bests at the event, breaking the 120-point mark in the free dance for the first time.

On the Grand Prix, the team was first assigned to the 2022 Grand Prix de France, where they won the silver medal, their first of that colour on the circuit. They set a new personal best in the rhythm dance for the second consecutive event. Fournier Beaudry said that "we have high aspirations, and we want to go to the Grand Prix Final, so we are one step closer to our goal for this season." The team's second event was the 2022 NHK Trophy in Sapporo, where they went in considered likely to repeat their silver medal result. However, they finished first in the rhythm dance with a new personal best score of 85.66, 0.66 points ahead of pre-event favourites and training partners Chock/Bates of the United States. They won the free dance as well, setting another set of personal bests, to take the gold medal over Chock/Bates and qualify for the Grand Prix Final. Fournier Beaudry called it "a dream come true and something we have worked for for a very long time," while Sørensen added, "thinking back and getting to where we are right now is just amazing."

Fournier Beaudry/Sørensen finished fourth in the rhythm dance at the Grand Prix Final in Turin, 1.39 points back of third-place Guignard/Fabbri of Italy. However, they made a major error in the free dance, falling out of their curve in the process of altering the position, resulting in the element being graded at only base level and two points lost in fall deductions. They finished sixth of six teams in that segment and dropped narrowly to sixth overall. Sørensen attributed the mistake to "lack of concentration."

With reigning Canadian national (and Grand Prix Final) champions Gilles/Poirier absent from the 2023 Canadian Championships due to Gilles requiring an appendectomy, Fournier Beaudry/Sørensen entered the event as the title favourites. They finished first in the rhythm dance despite a twizzle error from Sørensen, 2.15 points ahead of training partners Lajoie/Lagha. In the free dance, Fournier Beaudry tripped on her skirt in the midst of their choreographic slide move at the end of the program, costing them that element. They finished second in the free dance, but remained first overall by 0.60 points and won the gold medal. He called the championships "a really good time," despite the error.

Fournier Beaudry/Sørenson were the top Canadian dance team assigned to the 2023 Four Continents Championships, with Gilles/Poirier still absent. Fournier Beaudry sustained an MCL tear the week before the event, but with careful management they were able to attend the event. They placed second in the rhythm dance with a personal best 86.28, unexpectedly close to Chock/Bates in first with 87.67. In the free dance they set another new personal best of 127.80, finishing second in that segment as well and winning the silver medal. Sørensen said they were "so pleased winning our first championship medal of our entire career. It is our eleventh year skating together."

At the 2023 World Championships in Saitama, Fournier Beaudry/Sørensen were fifth in the rhythm dance. They placed fourth in the free dance, but remained in fifth place overall, 0.69 points behind Britons Fear/Gibson. Sørensen remarked that "we couldn't have asked for anything more."

==== 2023–2024 season: Four Continents silver ====
With the World Championships being held in Montreal, in replacement for the cancelled 2020 edition, Fournier Beaudry and Sørensen opted for a free dance to the Franco-Canadian musical Notre-Dame de Paris, citing the involvement of prominent Quebecois Luc Plamondon and Gilles Maheu. For the 1980s-themed rhythm dance, they took the opportunity to do a Top Gun program, a concept they had been contemplating for some time.

Fournier Beaudry/Sørensen began the season at the 2023 CS Finlandia Trophy, seeking to defend their gold medal from the prior season. Seventh in the rhythm dance after Fournier Beaudry fell, they won the free dance and rose to the bronze medal position. Returning to the Grand Prix de France to start the Grand Prix, they won the silver medal. The podium of gold medalists Guignard/Fabbri, silver medalists Fournier Beaudry/Sørensen, and bronze medalists Lopareva/Brissaud was the same as the previous year. They won another silver medal at the 2023 Grand Prix of Espoo. They finished fifth at the Grand Prix Final.

Days before the 2024 Canadian Championships, American journalist Christine Brennan reported in USA Today that Sørensen was under investigation by Canada's Sport Integrity Commissioner for an alleged sexual assault on an American skater in April 2012. Amidst the controversy, the team announced that they would withdraw from the championships, with Sørensen vowing to defend himself. Fournier Beaudry issued a statement calling him "a man of integrity, respect and kindness."

Despite the controversy, the pair competed as previously scheduled at the 2024 Four Continents Championships in Shanghai, winning their second consecutive silver medal. They were also assigned to the home 2024 World Championships, which attracted further media attention in light of the allegations. Sørensen declared "we're here today because we feel like we deserve to be here." They encountered difficulties in the rhythm dance after Fournier Beaudry had a twizzle error, and came tenth in the segment. They finished sixth in the free dance, but rose only to ninth overall. Fournier Beaudry called the crowd reception "really fantastic."

==== Suspension of Sørensen by Skate Canada ====
Fournier Beaudry/Sørensen were assigned to compete at the 2024 Skate America and 2024 NHK Trophy ahead of the 2024–25 season, and planned to open their season at the 2024 Shanghai Trophy in October. However, on 2 October 2024, it was announced that Sørensen had been banned by Skate Canada for a minimum of six years due to "sexual maltreatment" following an Office of the Sport Integrity Commissioner investigation into the allegations lodged against him earlier that year.

=== Partnership with Cizeron ===
==== 2025–2026 season: Olympic, World and European champions ====
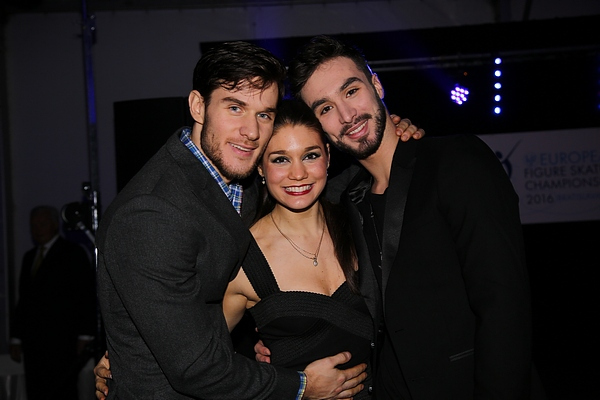
Sørensen, Fournier Beaudry, and Cizeron at the 2016 European Championships

In March 2025, Fournier Beaudry announced she would return to competition with new ice dance partner, 2022 Olympic champion Guillaume Cizeron, and that they would be representing France. In May 2025, in an interview with the Canadian press, the new partnership publicly supported Nikolaj Sørensen despite Sørensen receiving a minimum ban of 6 years for "sexual abuse."

The couple made their competitive debut in August 2025, winning gold at the French competition Masters de Villard-de-Lans. They withdrew from 2025 CS Nebelhorn Trophy, scheduled for late September, due to a change in their rhythm dance music that required adjustments to the program. Fournier Beaudry and Cizeron debuted their new rhythm dance, along with their free dance, at their first international competition, 2025 Grand Prix de France. They secured gold, edging out their competitors Fear/Gibson.

The following month, Fournier Beaudry was granted French citizenship, making her eligible for the 2026 Olympics. Later that month Fournier Beaudry and Cizeron took their second consecutive Grand Prix gold at 2025 Finlandia Trophy after placing first in both the Rhythm and Free Dance. In December, Fournier Beaudry and Cizeron took the silver at the 2025-26 Grand Prix Final behind Madison Chock and Evan Bates in their debut as a team at this event. They placed second in both the Rhythm Dance and Free Dance, picking up a new personal best in the latter. The following month, Fournier Beaudry and Cizeron won the title at the 2026 European Figure Skating Championships with over 12 points to spare.

On February 6, Fournier Beaudry and Cizeron placed second with a new personal best score of 89.98 in the Rhythm Dance at the 2026 Winter Olympics Figure Skating Team Event. That same day, the woman who accused Sørensen of sexual assault referenced Fournier Beaudry and Cizeron in a statement to The Canadian Press: "The comments of the reigning Olympic champion and a team in contention for the upcoming Olympic title carry weight, and using their voices to publicly undermine a survivor's truths further enforces the culture of silence in figure skating."

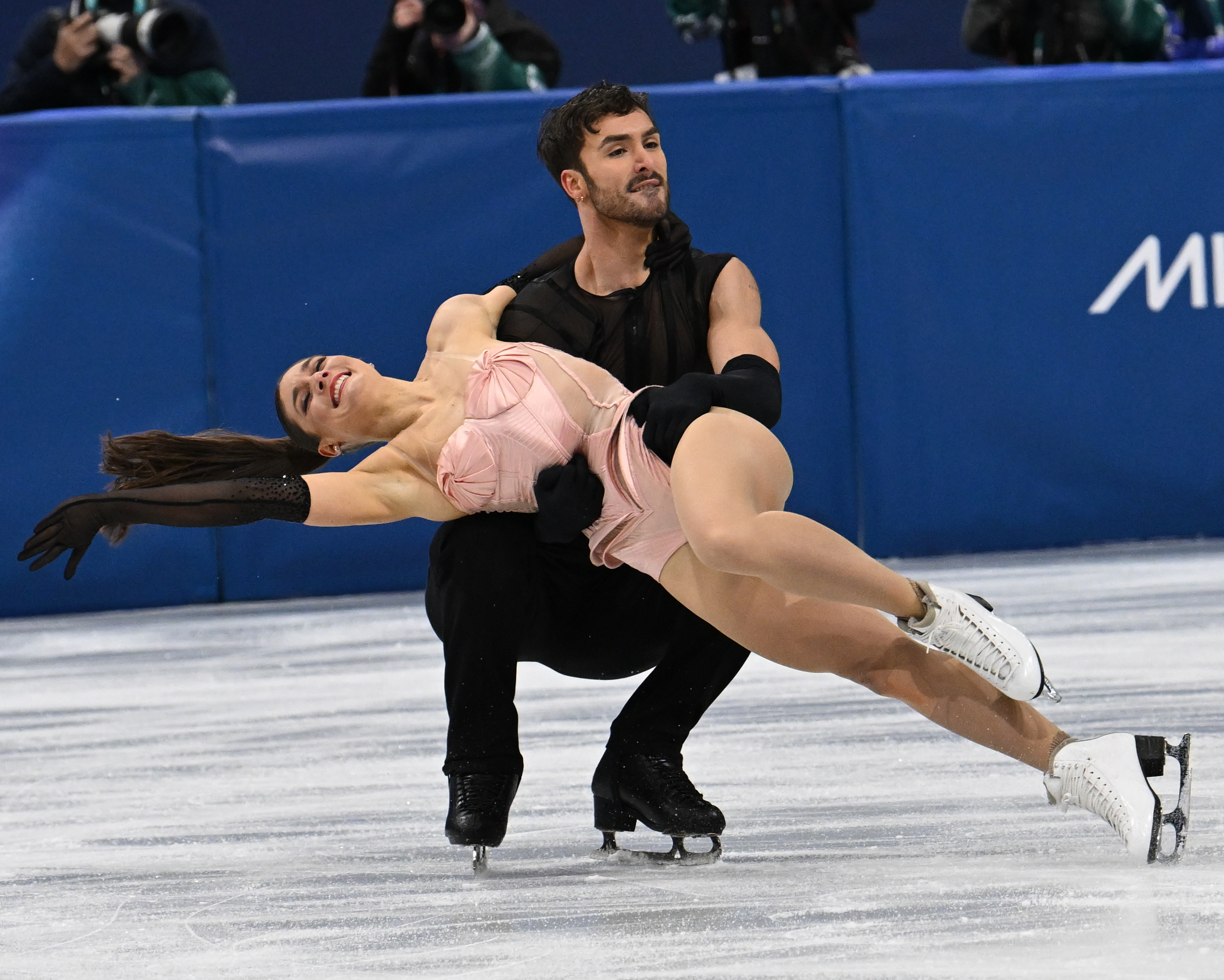
Fournier Beaudry and Cizeron performing their rhythm dance at the 2026 Winter Olympics

Five days later, Fournier Beaudry and Cizeron won the gold in the 2026 Winter Olympic Ice Dance event after placing first in both segments, edging out gold medal favourites Madison Chock and Evan Bates.

This final ice dance result sparked widespread controversy with several media outlets expressing outrage. Many noted that the French judge, Jézabel Dabouis, scored Chock and Bates lower than any other evaluator, nearly eight points lower than Fournier Beaudry and Cizeron in the free dance segment. She was also the only evaluator to give Chock and Bates a score lower than 130 points and one that was over 5.20 points below the average score posted by the remaining eight judges.

In response to the backlash, an ISU spokesperson said, "It is normal for there to be a range of scores given by different judges in any panel and a number of mechanisms are used to mitigate these variations. The ISU has full confidence in the scores given and remains completely committed to fairness." USA Today sports columnist Christine Brennan said Fournier Beaudry and Cizeron's win sent "an awful message [...] to sexual abuse survivors and victims, and parents who want their children to participate in a safe sport," citing that the reason the French ice dance team was formed was because of the investigation and subsequent suspension of Fournier Beaudry former ice dance partner and boyfriend, Sørensen, for allegedly sexually assaulting another figure skater. Despite this, Fournier Beaudry and Cizeron have consistently and publicly supported Sørensen with him even attending the Olympic ice dance event to support the team.

In March 2026, Fournier Beaudry and Cizeron competed in the 2026 World Figure Skating Championships. They placed first in the Rhythm Dance with a personal best score of 92.74, putting them in the lead by just over 5 points going into the Free Dance. “After the Olympics, we had a lot of media in Paris, so we spent some time there,” said Cizeron. “We came back home, rested a little…we were a bit sick for a week. Then we started training again, went to Lithuania for a show, and really enjoyed it there. It was a very good preparation. And then we trained at home for Worlds.” Two days later, they earned two more up another personal best scores in both the Free Dance and Total Score (138.07/230.81) to win the event. “We really had a good time tonight,” said Fournier Beaudry. “It was a really magical moment. We really felt the energy of the crowd. They were really warm and it felt like a celebration of a long and beautiful season for us. We are just really grateful.”

==== 2026–27 season ====
Fournier Beaudry and Cizeron opened their season with a win at 2026 Grand Prix de France. Cizeron had commented that last season "flew by." “We only had a little taste of our partnership. We wanted more, so we decided to keep going,” he confirmed. “We had a great first season, and we want to continue sharing the ice and having fun together.”

The following month, Fournier Beaudry and Cizeron took their second consecutive Grand Prix gold of the season at 2026 Finlandia Trophy. As a result the team qualified for the 2026–27 Grand Prix of Figure Skating Final. “We’re heading home for two days off to recover and reset before starting some intensive training for the Grand Prix Final,” said Fournier Beaudry. “It’s coming up very soon. From there, we’ll go straight to Elite de France, our national championships.”

== Programs ==
=== With Guillaume Cizeron ===
Season	Rhythm dance	Free dance	Exhibition
2026–2027	Malamente; El Redentor; De Madruga; La rumba del Perdon by Rosalia	They Will Shade Us with Their Wings; This Bitter Earth by Dinah Washington, Max Richter	Metamorphosis; Mad Rush composed by Philip Glass
2025–2026	Vogue (Bette Davis Dub); Rescue Me (Houseboat Vocal Mix); Vogue (Strike-A-Pose Dub); Vogue by Madonna & Shep Pettibone choreo. by Marie-France Dubreuil, Romain Haguenauer; Enjoy the Silence (The 12” Singles); Personal Jesus (Alex Metric Remix) by Depeche Mode choreo. by Marie-France Dubreuil, Romain Haguenauer, Samuel Chouinard, Ginette Cournoyer	The Whale; Opening; Rigging; Deep Water; Safe Return by Hugh Brunt & Rob Simonsen choreo. by Marie-France Dubreuil, Romain Haguenauer, Stéphane Lambiel	Metamorphosis; Mad Rush composed by Philip Glass

=== Ice dance with Nikolaj Sørensen ===
Season	Short dance	Free dance	Exhibition
2023–2024	Top Gun Anthem by Harold Faltermeyer, Steve Stevens; Playing with the Boys by Kenny Loggins; Take My Breath Away by Berlin; Hot Summer Nights by Miami Sound Machine; Danger Zone by Kenny Loggins (from Top Gun) choreo. by Marie-France Dubreuil, Romain Haguenauer, Ginette Cournoyer, Samuel Chouinard	Danse mon Esmeralda (from Notre-Dame de Paris) performed by Mario Pelchat; Final Angelus Bells by Monks Of The Abbey Of Notre Dame; Ave Maria Paien performed by Noa; Les Sans-Papiers performed by Cirque du Soleil, Jean-Phi Goncalves, Marie-Josée Lord; Danse mon Esmeralda performed by Garou (from Notre-Dame de Paris) by Luc Plamondon, Riccardo Cocciante choreo. by Marie-France Dubreuil, Romain Haguenauer, Ginette Cournoyer, Samuel Chouinard	Il mercenario; L'arena; Libertà (from Il mercenario); The Verdict (Dopo la condanna) (from The Big Gundown) by Ennio Morricone; El Mariachi; Guitar Town (from Once Upon a Time in Mexico) by Robert Rodriguez; Malagueña Salerosa by Marco de Lahuén, Chingon choreo. by Marie-France Dubreuil, Ginette Cournoyer, Samuel Chouinard
2022–2023	Rhumba: Con Los Años Que Me Quedan; Rhumba: Rhythm Is Gonna Get You; Rhumba: Conga by Gloria Estefan choreo. by Marie-France Dubreuil, Ginette Cournoyer, Samuel Chouinard	Il mercenario; L'arena; Libertà (from Il mercenario); The Verdict (Dopo la condanna) (from The Big Gundown) by Ennio Morricone; El Mariachi; Guitar Town (from Once Upon a Time in Mexico) by Robert Rodriguez; Malagueña Salerosa by Marco de Lahuén, Chingon choreo. by Marie-France Dubreuil, Ginette Cournoyer, Samuel Chouinard	Amsterdam: The Pact/The Murder by Daniel Pemberton; Time by Giveon
2021–2022	Blues: Careless Whisper; Funk: I Want Your Sex; Funk: Freedom! '90 by George Michael; Funk: Freedom! '90 by The Hyannis Sound choreo. by Marie-France Dubreuil, Ginette Cournoyer, Samuel Chouinard	The Wheat; The Battle; Homecoming; Elysium; Now We Are Free (from Gladiator) by Hans Zimmer, Lisa Gerrard choreo. by Marie-France Dubreuil, Ginette Cournoyer, Scott Moir; A Call to Prayer by Zola Dubnikova (Estas Tonne & One Heart Family); The Last Kingdom by Eivør Pálsdóttir, John Lunn; Skogsraah by Glen Gabriel; ROOTS - The Return to the Inner Temple by Zola Dubnikova & Estas Tonne; My England by John Lunn, Eivør choreo. by Scott Moir, Marie-France Dubreuil, Ginette Cournoyer	You Are the Reason by Calum Scott, Leona Lewis
2020–2021	Slow Foxtrot: Bonnie; Quickstep: This World Will Remember Us (from Bonnie & Clyde) by Frank Wildhorn, Don Black performed by Jeremy Jordan, Laura Osnes choreo. by Marie-France Dubreuil, Patrice Lauzon, Samuel Chouinard	A Call to Prayer by Zola Dubnikova (Estas Tonne & One Heart Family); The Last Kingdom by Eivør Pálsdóttir, John Lunn; Skogsraah by Glen Gabriel; ROOTS - The Return to the Inner Temple by Zola Dubnikova & Estas Tonne choreo. by Scott Moir, Marie-France Dubreuil, Ginette Cournoyer	
2019–2020	Blues: Raise A Little Hell; Slow Foxtrot: Bonnie; Quickstep: This World Will Remember Us (from Bonnie & Clyde) by Frank Wildhorn, Don Black performed by Jeremy Jordan, Laura Osnes choreo. by Marie-France Dubreuil, Patrice Lauzon, Samuel Chouinard	Summertime by George Gershwin, DuBose Heyward, Ira Gershwin performed by Chris Botti, David Foster; Georgia on My Mind by Hoagy Carmichael, Stuart Gorrell; Cry Me A River by Arthur Hamilton performed by Michael Bublé choreo. by Marie-France Dubreuil, Patrice Lauzon, Samuel Chouinard	
2018–2019	Tango: Balada para mi muerte; Tango: Adiós Nonino by Astor Piazzolla	Spanish Caravan by The Doors; Hush; Asturias performed by Marcin Patrzalek	You Are the Reason by Calum Scott, Leona Lewis
2017–2018	Slow Rhumba: Search for Vulcan from Thunderball by John Barry; Cha Cha: Whatever Lola Wants performed by Carmen McRae; Rhumba: Whatever Lola Wants performed by Les Baxter; Mambo: Peter Gunn Mambo by Jack Costanzo	Spanish Caravan by The Doors; Hush; Asturias performed by Marcin Patrzalek	
2016–2017	You're the Boss performed by Elvis Presley, Ann-Margret; A Little Less Conversation performed by Elvis Presley	La Vie en rose by Édith Piaf	Lay Me Down by Sam Smith
2015–2016	Waltz: Never Tear Us Apart by INXS; March: Karl van de Kerckhove music	Woman by Shawn Phillips	
2014–2015	Flamenco: Malagueña performed by Montana Skies; Paso doble: Malagueña performed by Klaus Hallen Dance Orchestra	The Summer Knows by Frank Sinatra; Summer of '42 (special composition) by Karl Hugo van Kerckhove; Summer Me, Winter Me by Frank Sinatra	
2013–2014	Foxtrot: All Of Me; Quickstep: I Never Knew; Foxtrot: All Of Me by Frank Sinatra	Wall Flower; In Your Eyes by Peter Gabriel	

== Competitive highlights ==
- GP – Event of the ISU Grand Prix Series
- CS – Event of the ISU Challenger Series
- JGP – Event of the ISU Junior Grand Prix Series
- Medals at team events are awarded for the team results only. Individual placements at team events are listed in parentheses.

=== Ice dance with Guillaume Cizeron (for France) ===
Competition placements at senior level
Season	2025–26	2026-27
Winter Olympics	1st	
Winter Olympics (Team event)	6th	
World Championships	1st	
European Championships	1st	
French Championships	1st	
Grand Prix Final	2nd	TBD
GP Finland	1st	1st
GP France	1st	1st
Master's de Patinage	1st	

=== Ice dance with Nikolaj Sørensen (for Canada) ===
Competition placements at senior level
Season	2018–19	2019–20	2020–21	2021–22	2022–23	2023–24
Winter Olympics				9th		
World Championships	10th		8th	9th	5th	9th
Four Continents Championships	6th				2nd	2nd
Grand Prix Final					6th	5th
Canadian Championships	3rd			2nd	1st	
GP Cup of China		3rd				
GP Finland						2nd
GP France					2nd	2nd
GP NHK Trophy					1st	
GP Rostelecom Cup				3rd		
GP Skate America		3rd		3rd		
CS Cup of Austria				2nd		
CS Finlandia Trophy					1st	3rd
CS Lombardia Trophy		2nd		2nd		
CS Nebelhorn Trophy		1st				
Skate Canada Challenge	1st		2nd			

=== Ice dance with Nikolaj Sørensen (for Denmark) ===
Competition placements at senior level
Season	2013–14	2014–15	2015–16	2016–17	2017–18
World Championships	29th	11th	13th	13th	
European Championships	18th	9th	9th	7th	9th
Danish Championships	1st	1st			1st
GP France			5th		
GP NHK Trophy					5th
GP Rostelecom Cup				7th	
GP Skate Canada			7th	7th	
CS Autumn Classic		3rd		3rd	7th
CS Finlandia Trophy			3rd	4th	3rd
CS Ice Challenge	2nd	2nd			
CS U.S. Classic			2nd		4th
CS Volvo Open Cup		4th			
Mentor Toruń Cup	3rd				
Pavel Roman Memorial	1st				

=== Ice dance with Yoan Breton (for Canada) ===
Competition placements at junior level
Season	2010–11	2011–12
Canadian Championships	6th	12th
JGP Romania		11th

=== Ice dance with Anthony Quintal (for Canada) ===
Competition placements at junior level
Season	2008–09
Canadian Championships	16th

== Detailed results ==
=== Ice dance with Guillaume Cizeron (for France) ===
ISU personal best scores in the +5/-5 GOE System
Segment	Type	Score	Event
Total	**TSS**	**230.81**	2026 World Championships
Rhythm dance	**TSS**	**92.74**	2026 World Championships
Rhythm dance	TES	54.12	2026 World Championships
Rhythm dance	PCS	38.62	2026 World Championships
Free dance	**TSS**	**138.07**	2026 World Championships
Free dance	TES	78.85	2026 World Championships
Free dance	PCS	59.22	2026 World Championships

Results in the 2025-26 season
Date	Event	RD		FD		Total	
Date	Event	P	Score	P	Score	P	Score
Aug 28-30, 2025	(France) 2025 Master's de Patinage	1	88.54	1	130.53	1	219.07
Oct 17-19, 2025	2025 Grand Prix de France	3	78.00	1	133.02	1	211.02
Nov 21-22, 2025	(Finland) 2025 Finlandia Trophy	1	79.89	1	124.29	1	204.18
Dec 4–7, 2025	(Japan) 2025–26 Grand Prix Final	2	87.56	2	126.69	2	214.25
Dec 18-20, 2025	(France) 2026 French Championships	1	94.31	1	139.39	1	233.70
Jan 13-18, 2026	(United Kingdom) 2026 European Championships	1	86.93	1	135.50	1	222.43
Feb 6–8, 2026	(Italy) 2026 Winter Olympics – Team event	2	89.98	—N/a	—N/a	6	—N/a
Feb 6–19, 2026	(Italy) 2026 Winter Olympics	1	90.18	1	135.64	1	225.82
Mar 24–29, 2026	(Czech Republic) 2026 World Championships	1	**92.74**	1	**138.07**	1	**230.81**

Results in the 2026-27 season
Date	Event	RD		FD		Total	
Date	Event	P	Score	P	Score	P	Score
Oct 23-25, 2026	2026 Grand Prix de France	1	82.56	1	125.01	1	207.57

=== Ice dance with Nikolaj Sørensen (for Canada) ===
Small medals for short and free programs awarded only at ISU Championships. At team events, medals awarded for team results only. Current ISU personal bests highlighted in bold.

**2023–2024 season**
Date	Event	RD	FD	Total
March 18–24, 2024	2024 World Championships	10; 75.79	6; 124.12	9; 199.91
Jan. 30 – Feb. 4, 2024	2024 Four Continents Championships	2; 82.02	2; 125.52	2; 207.54
December 7–10, 2023	2023–24 Grand Prix Final	5; 74.82	5; 120.75	5; 195.57
November 17–19, 2023	2023 Grand Prix of Espoo	2; 82.62	2; 123.70	2; 206.32
November 3–5, 2023	2023 Grand Prix de France	2; 80.98	2; 124.17	2; 205.15
October 4–8, 2023	2023 CS Finlandia Trophy	7; 67.67	1; 120.89	3; 188.56
**2022–23 season**
Date	Event	RD	FD	Total
March 22–26, 2023	2023 World Championships	5; 85.59	4; **128.45**	5; 214.04
February 7–12, 2023	2023 Four Continents Championships	2; **86.28**	2; 127.80	2; **214.08**
January 9–15, 2023	2023 Canadian Championships	1; 87.06	2; 125.34	1; 212.40
December 8–11, 2022	2022–23 Grand Prix Final	4; 83.16	6; 112.99	6; 196.15
November 18–20, 2022	2022 NHK Trophy	1; 85.66	1; 124.75	1; 210.41
November 4–6, 2022	2022 Grand Prix de France	2; 82.38	2; 119.55	2; 201.93
October 4–9, 2022	2022 CS Finlandia Trophy	1; 81.83	1; 121.93	1; 203.76
**2021–22 season**
Date	Event	RD	FD	Total
March 21–27, 2022	2022 World Championships	8; 78.29	9; 110.25	9; 188.54
February 12–14, 2022	2022 Winter Olympics	8; 78.54	11; 113.81	9; 192.35
January 6–12, 2022	2022 Canadian Championships	2; 81.04	2; 125.61	2; 206.65
November 26–28, 2021	2021 Rostelecom Cup	3; 76.39	3; 115.01	3; 191.40
November 11–14, 2021	2021 CS Cup of Austria	3; 77.38	2; 117.29	2; 194.67
October 22–24, 2021	2021 Skate America	3; 75.33	4; 114.80	3; 190.13
September 10–12, 2021	2021 CS Lombardia Trophy	2; 76.64	2; 108.62	2; 185.26
**2020–21 season**
Date	Event	RD	FD	Total
March 22–28, 2021	2021 World Championships	7; 77.87	8; 119.01	8; 196.88
January 8–17, 2021	2021 Skate Canada Challenge	2; 86.55	2; 120.36	2; 206.91
2019–20 season
Date	Event	RD	FD	Total
November 8–10, 2019	2019 Cup of China	3; 78.41	3; 112.33	3; 190.74
October 18–20, 2019	2019 Skate America	3; 79.17	3; 118.36	3; 197.53
September 25–28, 2019	2019 CS Nebelhorn Trophy	1; 81.16	1; 119.84	1; 201.00
September 13–15, 2019	2019 CS Lombardia Trophy	2; 79.11	2; 110.25	2; 189.36
2018–19 season
Date	Event	RD	FD	Total
March 18–24, 2019	2019 World Championships	10; 74.76	9; 113.34	10; 188.10
February 7–10, 2019	2019 Four Continents Championships	6; 73.70	6; 113.61	6; 186.91
January 13–20, 2019	2019 Canadian Championships	3; 79.41	3; 119.00	3; 198.41
