= Del Castillo (band) =

American Latin rock band

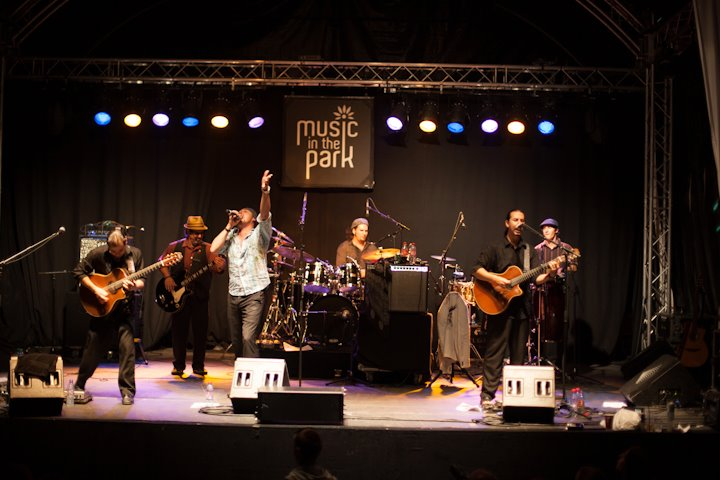
- Performing at the Montreux Jazz Festival

Background information
- Origin: Austin, TX United States
- Genres: Nuevo americano, Rock, Latin, Blues, Instrumental, World music, Latin rock
- Years active: 2000–present
- Label: Smilin' Castle
- Members: Rick del Castillo; Mark del Castillo; Danny Ortiz; Albert Besteiro; Mike Zeoli; Jason Murdy
- Past members: Rick Holeman; David Alejandro Ruiz; Carmelo Torres; Noah Mosgofian; Cecilio Ruiz III
- Website: Del Castillo Official Website

Del Castillo is a Latin rock band, based in Austin, Texas.

== History ==
Del Castillo began as a Latin music style project between two brothers, Rick and Mark del Castillo in the fall of 2000. The brothers, who had always played electric guitar in many different rock bands, had never played together and for the first time ever they began collaborating on songs on nylon string, acoustic guitars. So Rick and Mark decided to record some music together that their family could enjoy and culturally relate to. Their musical friend, Alex Ruiz, began adding lyrics to the brothers' instrumentals, and soon after, the other band members joined them. Rick recruited his friend Albert Besteiro, Jr., on bass and friend Cecilio Ruiz III on percussion and vocals, and Mark invited drummer Mike Zeoli, from their other joint project, Milhouse. After receiving very positive and most encouraging responses from everyone who heard the music they created, the project naturally began to evolve into a real band. They began playing regularly around the Austin area. The intensity of the band's live performance centers around the two brothers playing guitar. Although not traditionally trained flamenco players, the two have rivaled the Gipsy Kings, Strunz and Farah, and Santana in speed and accuracy, backed by a strong and swift rhythm section.

With the original line-up complete, Del Castillo began writing material, fusing styles and influences, while retaining a solid Latin element. The band released their debut CD Brothers of the Castle in 2001, which met with rave reviews from critics and music fans alike.

Following the release of their second album, Vida, Del Castillo received invitation to appear on the soundtrack of director Robert Rodríguez's Once Upon a Time in Mexico and the honor of winning "Best Austin Band of the Year" along with six other major awards at the 2002-2003 Austin Music Awards.

The Del Castillo Live DVD, filmed and edited by Robert Rodríguez, was released in early 2004. Filmed at the famous Steamboat on 6th Street in Austin, it captured the fire and intensity of their live performances. Also that year, Quentin Tarantino used a Del Castillo song in Kill Bill Vol. 2, performed by Chingon, Robert Rodríguez's musical collective of some of his closest musical compadres, including members of Del Castillo. Del Castillo, with Robert, performed as Chingon at the premier of the film in Los Angeles.

In the Spring of 2006, Del Castillo released their third CD, Brotherhood, which was immediately acclaimed by the media across the board.

In late 2006, Rick Holeman retired from the band, and the group found a new percussionist, Carmelo Torres from Austin. Carmelo was eventually replaced by Jason Murdy in 2010. Jason has toured extensively with Del Castillo and is now contributing new music for the band.

Del Castillo collaborated with the Grammy award-winning lead vocalist Danny Ortiz from Grupo Mazz in 2004, who performed live with Del Castillo. Del Castillo were featured on the ABC crime/drama show Killer Women with their instrumental single, "Las Seis Cuerdas de Tony Montuno".

== Members ==
- Rick del Castillo – Guitar and vocals

"Ever since I can remember, music has filled my heart and soul. From my humble beginnings of banging on trash cans at the age of six to touring across the country all through my twenties, music was my one constant companion. I've delved in many genres but playing Spanish/ flamenco music on a nylon guitar with my brother and four other dear friends seems to fuel my muse to infinite measures. All I've learned through my 24 years of playing, touring, producing and engineering has led me to this point." – Rick del Castillo

- Mark del Castillo – Guitar and vocals

Mark del Castillo grew up in the Rio Grande Valley city of Brownsville, Texas, surrounded by the many musical influences of his family. Inspired by the talent and success of his older brother Rick del Castillo, he began to immerse himself in the study of guitar at age 14. Mark was a self-taught guitarist until he became a Music Major at the University of Texas at Brownsville in 1990. At that time he studied Music Theory, Ear Training, and Applied Guitar as well as joining the University Latin/Jazz band. In 1991, at the age of 19, he joined a cover band called Kickstart and began to build a reputation for himself as a guitarist. After playing with Kickstart for over three years, Mark moved away to pursue further education in Biomedical Science at Texas A&M University. While a student there, he and some friends formed a cover band called Vivid. After graduating in 1996, Mark and Vivid relocated to Austin, Texas and began to play regularly on the 6th Street Circuit, various other cities in Texas, and in Europe. While playing in Vivid, he joined his first original rock band called Milhouse. This was his first collaboration with Mike Zeoli (Del Castillo's drummer). On the first Milhouse CD, which his brother Rick recorded and produced, Mark recorded an instrumental Latin track entitled “Para Mija Linda” showcasing his Spanish style guitar playing. This song became a huge inspiration for him to return to his roots and write more Spanish guitar music. After composing several instrumentals, Mark began working to add lyrics to some of the songs. Mark presented these songs to his brother Rick, who, realizing that they had never worked together, suggested that the Del Castillo brothers combine their creative forces and talents. Mark realized that this is the music that is true to his heart, in his soul, and will always live within him.

- Danny Ortiz – Lead vocals and percussion
- Albert Besteiro – Bass and vocals

Born in the barrio, "raised on Budweiser and Blues!"

- Mike Zeoli – Drums, percussion and vocals.

As a child, Zeoli was fascinated by the entrancing power of rhythm. He was known to entertain his neighborhood friends with daily performances full of dancing and drumming. Every night before falling asleep, he would lie in his bed and dream of playing thunderous, polyrhythmic beats that traveled on magic sound waves into outer space and into heaven. "The beats and rhythms I play are like my prayers and gifts to the multi (uni)verse." - he once mentioned. Mike has a diverse background in music and rhythm. He has performed with Ahmad Aladeen, Bobby Shoe, Clark Terry and Louis Bellson. He studied music at S.M.S.U. in Springfield, Missouri and also studied privately with John Cushon (Oleta Adams) and Gary Chaffee (independent).

- Jason Murdy – Percussion and vocals (joined the band in 2010)

Frequent visits to Mexico as a child helped to inspire his rhythmic interests to explore more of a worldly perspective. He latched on to the Latin sound, for its ability to be easily applied to popular music.

== Discography ==
=== Albums ===
==== Brothers of the Castle (2001) ====
- 01 Mi Cariño
- 02 Spanish Castle Tango
- 03 Dias de Los Angeles
- 04 Song For Jordan
- 05 29/11
- 06 La Luz a Mi Paso
- 07 Mexican Lounge Lizard
- 08 Barrio Blues
- 09 Suenos de Ti
- 10 El Camino menos Transitado

==== Vida (2002) ====
- 01 Don Nicolás
- 02 Vida
- 03 Sueños Madrigales
- 04 Para mi Sobrina
- 05 Mi Gitana
- 06 Los Caballos
- 07 Dame un Momento
- 08 Yiddish March
- 09 ¿Por Qué?
- 10 Back From the Grave + *Barrio Blues (live) [Bonus Hidden Track]

==== Brotherhood (2006) ====
- 01 Arena Al Viento
- 02 Brotherhood
- 03 Este Amor
- 04 Ganate El Mundo
- 05 Quiereme
- 06 Rios Misticos
- 07 Maria
- 08 Talkin' To Ya
- 09 Perdoname
- 10 I Never Cared For You [feat. Willie Nelson]
- 11 Vida Latina
- 12 Que Dolor
- 13 Si, Mi Amor
- 14 El Corrido de Don Lulai

==== Del Castillo (self-titled) 2009 ====
- 01 Boricua del Cielo
- 02 Everlasting
- 03 Castles
- 04 Noche Brava
- 05 Cafe Sin Leche
- 06 Amor Dolor
- 07 Anybody Wanna?
- 08 Entre Flores y La Luna
- 09 Little Angel
- 10 Corazon Loco
- 11 Light
- 12 Home
- 13 Anybody Wanna? (Radio Edit)

==== Infinitas Rapsodias 2012 (CD & Live DVD) ====
- 01 Lumbres de Babylon (Live)
- 02 Fuego Egipcio (feat. Monte Montgomery)
- 03 Mujer Angel
- 04 Canta de Alma
- 05 Brotherhood (feat. Malford Milligan & Leeann Atherton)
- 06 Rios Misticos (Dance Mix)
- 07 Para Mi Sobrina (feat. Carl Thiel)
- 08 Vida (feat. Phoebe Hunt)
- 09 Maria (Italian Version)
- 10 Perdóname (feat. Carl Thiel & Erik Hokkanen)
- 11 Mi Cariño (2012 Version)
- 12 Porque (feat. Erik Hokkanen)
- 13 Amor Venme a Buscar (Duet with Anna Maria Kaufmann)
- 14 Listen to the Music (Live)
- 15 What a Wonderful World (Live)
- 16 While My Guitar Gently Weeps (Live)

=== Miscellaneous & Unreleased Songs ===
- Silent Night (briefly available on the official Del Castillo website)
- Something Pure (an English version of their song “Qué Dolor”)
- The Chuco Went Down To Texas (briefly featured on the official Del Castillo Myspace page)
- The Chant (officially untitled song, beginning with the words "No eres el cuerpo, Eres todo..." that was playing on the official Del Castillo website's home page until Apr 7 2009)
- Consumido (available on iTunes)
- El Gran Fandango

=== Chingon ===
- Mexican Spaghetti Western (2004)
- 01 Se Me Paró
- 02 Malaguena Salerosa [La Malaguena]
- 03 Fideo Del Oeste [Mexican Spaghetti Western]
- 04 Severina
- 05 Alacran y Pistolero
- 06 Bajo Sexto [Six Below]
- 07 Cielito Lindo
- 08 Mexican Sausage Link
- 09 Siente Mi Amor [featuring Salma Hayek]
- 10 Cuka Rocka [Extended]

=== Compilations ===
- "Voices of a Grateful Nation, Vol 1 - Texas Rock, Blues & Folk" CD (2008)

Volume 1 of the series features the Del Castillo songs "Letter Home" and "La Letra".

=== Soundtracks ===
- The Cry - La Llorona (2007)
- “La Llorona” with Patricia Vonne (opening and end credits).
- “Talkin’ To Ya” (from Brotherhood CD), “Don Nicolas” and “Sueños Madrigales” (from Vida CD)

This film was never released. It's rumored that it went straight to video.

- Kill Bill Vol. 2 Soundtrack (2004)
- “Malaguena Salerosa [La Malaguena]” (Rick and Mark del Castillo/guitar, Alex Ruiz/vocals, Rick Holeman/percussion)
- Mexico and Mariachis (2004)
- “Alacran y Pistolero” (Rick and Mark del Castillo/guitar, Alex Ruiz/backing vocals, Rick Holeman/percussion)
- “Severina” (Rick and Mark del Castillo/guitar)
- “Theme from El Mariachi” (Rick del Castillo/guitar, Rick Holeman/percussion)
- “Back To The House That Love Built” (Acoustic) (Rick del Castillo/guitar, Rick Holeman/percussion)
- “Spanish Castle Tango” (Written, Performed, and Produced by Del Castillo)

The track on this soundtrack is a slightly different edit of the track from their album Brothers of the Castle.

- “Once Upon A Time in Mexico” (Main Titles) (Rick and Mark del Castillo/guitar, Rick Holeman/percussion)
- Once Upon a Time in Mexico Soundtrack (2003)
- “Eye Patch” (Rick del Castillo/guitar, percussion; Alex Ruiz/vocals)
- “Guitar Town” (Rick del Castillo/guitar)
- “Church Shootout” (Rick del Castillo/guitar, drums)
- “Dias de los Angeles” (written, performed, produced by Del Castillo). The track on this soundtrack is a slightly different edit of the track from their Live DVD.
- “Mariachi vs. Marquez” (Rick del Castillo/guitar)
- “Coup De Etat” (Rick del Castillo/guitar)
- “El Mariachi” (Rick del Castillo/guitar)
- “Siente Mi Amor” (Rick del Castillo/guitar)
- “Cuka Rocka” (Rick and Mark del Castillo/guitar)
- Spy Kids 3D: Game Over (2003)
- “Game Over” (Rick del Castillo/guitar)
- “Isle Of Dreams” (Rick del Castillo/guitar)

== DVD ==
- Del Castillo Live DVD (2004)
- 01 Dias de los Angeles
- 02 Sueños Madrigales
- 03 El Camino Menos Transitado
- 04 Vida
- 05 Mi Cariño
- 06 Para mi Sobrina

== Videography ==
- Maria
- Perdoname

Produced by Martina Amende with her company Sapo de Oro in New Mexico. Martina and her videographer Carl Thiel filmed Del Castillo in Geneva, Switzerland for Cartier in 2006.

== Awards ==
Killing Snakes - A short film show in Cannes - 2007, Co-written with very dear and special friend Martina Amende, won a Gold award for best score at Park City, Utah 2008.

- Album of the Year –“BROTHERHOOD” – Austin Music Awards/South By Southwest (2007)
- Best Latin Traditional Band - Austin Music Awards/South By Southwest (2007)
- Best Latin Traditional Band – Austin Music Awards/South By Southwest (2006)
- Best Independent Group of the Year - ASCAP Latin Music Awards (2005)
- Best Latin Traditional Band - Austin Music Awards / South By Southwest (2005)
- #1 Best Live Act by Austin Music Pundits - AMP Awards (2004)
- Best Latin Contemporary Band - Austin Music Awards / South By Southwest (2004)
- Best Latin Music Video 2003 for "Suenos Madrigales" from "DEL CASTILLO LIVE" DVD - Austin Music Network Music Video Awards
- 7 major awards at Austin Music Awards / South By Southwest (2003):
- AUSTIN BAND OF THE YEAR
- BEST ALBUM OF THE YEAR: "VIDA"
- BEST DRUMS: Mike Zeoli
- AUSTIN SINGLE OF THE YEAR: "VIDA"
- BEST COVER ART: "VIDA"
- RECORD PRODUCER: Rick del Castillo - "VIDA"
- MEXICAN TRADITIONAL - DEL CASTILLO
- Best World Music Band and Best Mexican/Traditional Latino Band - Austin Music Awards / South By Southwest (2002)
- Best World Music Band and Best Mexican/Traditional Latino Band - Austin Music Awards / South By Southwest (2002)
- Honored by the Austin Latin Music Association. Live performance filmed for "Sonidos del Barrios" TV series. (2002)
- Best Latin Rock Band - “Primetime Tejano” TV/Austin (2002)

== Special Performances/Media ==
- Gibson Dark Fire Guitar Launch with Rick and Mark del Castillo - Austin (Dec 15th, 2008)
- Outlaw Trail Concert - Paramount Theatre, Austin (2008)
- Dan Rather Reports: Latino Invasions On Hdnet (2007)
- Austin City Limits Music Festival – Austin (2006)
- Wakarusa Music and Camping Festival – Lawrence, Ks (2006) · Headlined Kgsr T-Shirt Party – Austin (2006)
- Latin Nation TV (2006)
- Willie Nelson’s 4th Of July Picnic – 2 Nights: Carl’s Corner/Ft. Worth (2006)
- George Lopez / ABC-TV (2005) - featuring Rick, Mark, and Alex
- Black Tie and Boots Ball - Washington, DC during Inauguration week (2005)
- American/Latino TV (2004)
- Willie Nelson’s 4th of July Picnic - Ft. Worth (2004)
- Eric Clapton's Crossroads Guitar Festival - Dallas (2004)
- Kill Bill, Vol 2 Premier. Performed in Chingon with Robert Rodriguez - Los Angeles (2004)
- House of Blues with special guest appearance by Robert Rodriguez - Los Angeles (2004)
- Headlined KGSR’s Spring T-Party - Austin (2004)
- “Chingon” Evening with Robert Rodriguez and Bruce Willis & The Accelerators - Austin (2004)
- Willie Nelson’s 4 July Picnic - Ft. Worth (2003)
- Once Upon a Time in Mexico Premier. Robert Rodriguez, Antonio Banderas and Cheech Marin performed with the band - New York (2003)
- Spy Kids 3-D: Game Over World Premier. Robert Rodriguez performed with the band - Austin (2003)
- LATV, in conjunction with debut Los Angeles showcase performances at the Roxy and Conga Room (2003)
- 2003 Convention of the National Council of La Raza - Austin (2003)

== National Touring ==
2009-2012

Extensive US and EU promotional touring clubs, festivals, theaters, etc. Began working with premiere German booking agency, ASS. Collaborating creatively on new songs in the studio with Los Lonely Boys.

2007–2008

National touring throughout the U.S. and in Europe, including many major music festivals such as the Sierra Nevada Music Fest, California Worldfest, and Great Woods Music Fest (Canada).

2006

National tour: shows with Los Lonely Boys/Indigenous/Styx/deSol/Don Henley. Performed at corporate event for Cartier in Geneva, Switzerland. Set attendance records at The Glenn and Antone’s in Austin.

2005

Headlined at the Mexico Now! Festival in New York and at the Open House Arts Festival at Kennedy Center in Washington, DC celebrating the Center’s 34th Anniversary. National headline tour, including Las Vegas/Kansas City/St. Louis/Nashville/Virginia Beach/Syracuse/Santa Fe/ Albuquerque. Shows with the Neville Brothers in Austin, and with Buddy Guy in Des Moines.

2004

Headline shows in New York/Atlanta/Memphis. Shows with Ozomatli in Tucson/New Orleans/ Orlando/Washington, DC/Detroit/Chicago/Minneapolis/Albuquerque/Santa Fe; with Los Lobos in Des Moines/Dallas/Austin/San Antonio/El Paso.
