= Mark del Castillo =

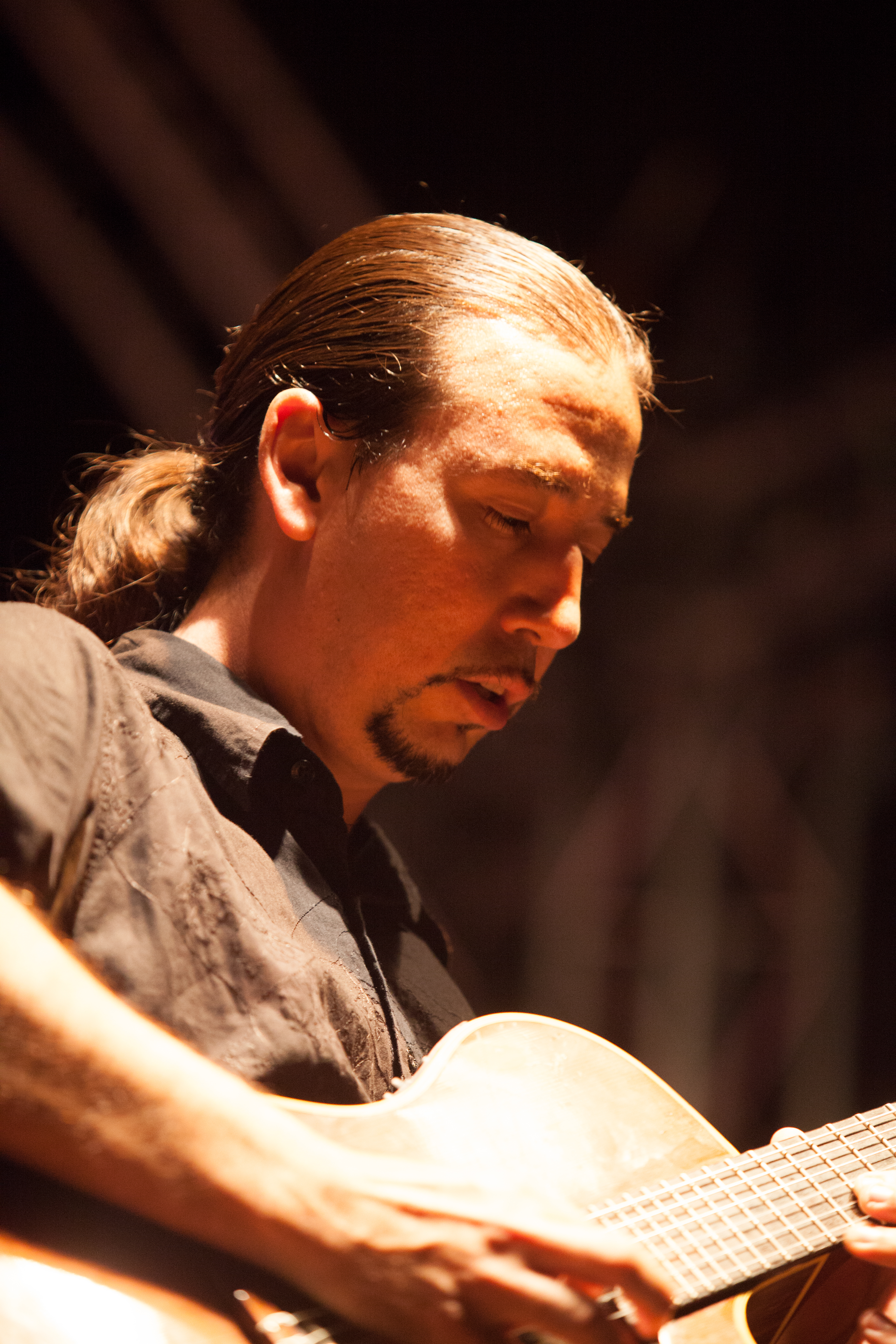
- Mark del Castillo performing with Del Castillo at Montreux Jazz Festival

Background information
- Origin: Brownsville, Texas, United States
- Genres: Guitar Virtuoso / Nuevo Flamenco / Rock / Latin / Blues / World Music
- Occupation(s): Musician, Songwriter, Composer
- Instrument(s): Guitar, backing vocals

Mark del Castillo is a guitarist, vocalist, composer and songwriter.

== Early life and education ==
Mark del Castillo was born in Brownsville, Texas, United States. Raised in a family with many musical influences, he started learning guitar at age 14, following after his talented older brother Rick del Castillo. For some time Mark studied guitar by himself; then in year 1990 he entered the University of Texas at Brownsville and became a Music Major. There Mark studied Music Theory, Ear Training, and Applied Guitar and played in University Latin/Jazz band.

== Career ==
In 1991, Mark started to play with a cover band called Kickstart as a guitarist and spent over three years with them. He left Kickstart, and went to Texas A&M University to study in the College of Biomedical Science. There Mark and several his student friends came together to play as a band called Vivid. They graduated in 1996 and moved to Austin, Texas, where they started to perform on the famous 6th Street circuit. As Vivid they played in other cities in Texas and even had some show trips to Europe.

At that time Mark del Castillo also joined the rock band called Milhouse, where he for the first time met Mike Zeoli (drummer of Del Castillo). Mark's brother Rick recorded and produced the first Milhouse CD, for which Mark wrote and performed an instrumental Latin-flamenco track named “Para Mija Linda”. Written for his future wife, this song inspired him very much, and he started to write more guitar music in different Spanish styles. Mark created a few instrumentals and then began collaboration with Alex Ruiz, who wrote lyrics to several of songs. Mark offered these songs to his brother Rick del Castillo. Rick liked them very much. The brothers realized that they had never worked together before and decided to start writing and playing music together.

Mark now plays guitar and sings in the Del Castillo band he founded together with his brother Rick. Along with the other members of Del Castillo Mark also plays in Robert Rodríguez's Chingon band.

Mark and Rick del Castillo were honored of being two of only about six musicians worldwide to launch the Gibson Dark Fire guitar. The Del Castillo Brothers presented the Dark Fire at Antone's club in Austin, Texas, on December 15, 2008.

Equipment list

- Takamine Classical Nylon customized by Peter Mark
- Yamaha APX10NA Classical Guitar customized by Peter Mark (main performance guitar)
- Genz Benz Shen Pro Acoustic Amplifier
- RMC Poly Drive IV Pickup System
- Ernie Ball Volume Pedal
- Boss DD-3 Digital Delay Pedal
- BOSS 7-Band Graphic EQ Pedal
- Boss Tuner Pedal
- Electro-Harmonix "Black Finger" Compressor Pedal
- Jim Dunlop "Mark del Castillo Signature" Tortex Picks (black/gold)
- D'Addario Hard Tension Nylon Strings

== Discography ==
=== Milhouse ===
- Milhouse (self-titled debut) (1999)

=== Del Castillo ===
- Brothers of the Castle (2001)
- Vida (2002)
- Del Castillo Live DVD (2004)
- Brotherhood (2006)
- Del Castillo (self-titled) (2009)

=== Chingon ===
- Mexican Spaghetti Western (2004)
