= Mexican Spaghetti Western =

Studio album by Chingon
- Released: 2004
- Genres: Tex-Mex, rock
- Length: 45:09
- Label: Rocket Racing Rebels

Mexican Spaghetti Western is a studio album by Robert Rodriguez's band, Chingon. Originally released in 2004 exclusively on the band's website, it became available in stores on April 10, 2007. The original non-digi-pak release of the album did not include the song "Cielito Lindo".

== Track listing ==
1. "Se Me Paró" – 3:27
2. "Malagueña Salerosa" (La Malaguena) – 4:07
3. "Fideo Del Oeste" – 5:33
4. "Severina" (co-written and sung by Patricia Vonne) – 3:01
5. "Alacrán y Pistolero" (written and performed by Tito Larriva) – 3:36
6. "El Rey De Los Chingones" – 4:49
7. "Bajo Sexto" – 3:29
8. "Cielito Lindo" – 3:27
9. "Mexican Sausage Link" – 3:06
10. "Siente Mi Amor" – 4:26 (performed by Salma Hayek)
11. "Cuka Rocka" [extended] – 6:08

== Appearances in Rodriguez' films ==
"Malagueña Salerosa" is a re-arrangement of the classic mariachi standard, which Robert Rodriguez originally arranged for Desperado. It made its first appearance on this album, and also featured in Kill Bill: Volume 2. Rodriguez was credited in Kill Bill for his original guitar pieces in the film as well as part of Chingon.

"Siente Mi Amor" was featured on the soundtrack Once Upon a Time in Mexico, a film "shot, chopped and scored" by Robert Rodriguez, a follow-up to Desperado.

A shortened version of "Cuka Rocka" was also featured on the Once Upon a Time in Mexico soundtrack.

== Bonus tracks ==
Some versions of the album feature, as a bonus track, "Sin City Theme (Chingonized)", another Rodriguez piece from a film he also directed.

The bonus edition additionally includes four tracks from the Machete soundtrack and the chingonized "Grindhouse Theme".

== Chingón ==
- Alex Ruiz - Vocals
- Robert Rodríguez – Guitar, vocals on "Cucka Rocka", backing vocals
- Carl Thiel - Computer, loop programming, organ, whistle, percussion, trumpet, backing vocals
- Rafael Gayol - Drums on "Se Me Paró", "Bajo Sexto", "Cielito Lindo", "Mexican Sausage Link"
- Mark Del Castillo - Guitars on "Fideo del Oeste", "Severina", "El Rey de los Chingones", "Bajo Sexto", "Cielito Lindo", "Mexican Sausage Link", "Cucka Rocka"
- Rick Del Castillo - Guitars on "Fideo del Oeste", "Severina", "El Rey de los Chingones", "Cielito Lindo", "Siente Mi Amor", "Cucka Rocka"

== Session Musicians ==
- Rick "Rey" Holeman - Percussion on "Malagueña Salerosa", "Alacrán y Pistolero"
- Alex Ramírez - Trumpet on "Malagueña Salerosa"
- Gilbert Elorreaga - Trumpet on "Fideo del Oeste"
- Cecilio Ruiz III - Drums on "Malagueña Salerosa", "Alacrán y Pistolero"
- Dony Winn - Drums on "Severina"
- Robert Laroche - Acoustic guitar on "Severina"
- George Reiff - Bass on "Severina"
- Sunny Sauceda - Bajo sexto on "Bajo Sexto"
- Michael Blake - Acoustic rhythm guitar on "Siente Mi Amor"
- Steve Hufsteter - Electric guitar on "Siente Mi Amor"
- Chris Maresh - Bass on "Siente Mi Amor"
- Diego Simmons - Percussion on "Siente Mi Amor"
- Dwight Baker - Drums on "Siente Mi Amor"

== Special Guests ==
- Tito Larriva - Vocals and guitar on "Alacrán y Pistolero"
- Salma Hayek – Vocals on "Siente Mi Amor"
- Patricia Vonne – Vocals on "Severina"

== Other credits ==
- Album art by: George Yepes
