= Chingon (band) =

Latin rock band

- Origin: Austin, Texas, United States
- Genres: Rock, Latin, blues, Latin Rock, mariachi, ranchera, Tex-Mex
- Years active: 2003–present
- Label: Rocket Racing Rebels
- Members: Robert Rodriguez; Rick del Castillo; Mark del Castillo; Danny Ortiz; Albert Besteiro; Mike Zeoli; Jason Murdy
- Past members: Carmelo Torres

Chingon is a band from Austin, Texas. Their sound is heavily influenced by Mexican rock, mariachi, ranchera, and Texan rock 'n roll music.

== History ==
Chingon was formed by film director Robert Rodriguez to record songs for his 2003 film Once Upon a Time in Mexico. They contributed to Mexico and Mariachis, a compilation album from Rodriguez' Mariachi Trilogy, and released their debut album, Mexican Spaghetti Western, in 2007. The band's name comes from a Mexican slang term, chingón, loosely but closely enough meaning "badass" and/or "the shit".

Chingon also contributed the song "Malagueña Salerosa" to Quentin Tarantino's Kill Bill: Volume 2 — which Rodriguez scored — and a live performance by the band was included on the film's DVD release. They also contributed to the soundtrack for his next film, a collaboration with Tarantino, Grindhouse, doing a cover of the film's opening theme, re-titling it "Cherry's Dance of Death". Rodríguez plays guitar in the band. The band has also made an appearance on "George Buys a Vow", an episode of the US sitcom George Lopez.

On December 12, 2015, Chingon performed as the house band for Lucha Underground during a Season Two taping. Rodriguez is an Executive Producer for the series and it airs on his network, El Rey Network.

== Band members ==
- Robert Rodriguez – guitar
- Alex Ruiz – vocals
- Mark del Castillo – guitar, vocals
- Rick del Castillo – guitar, vocals
- Albert Besteiro – bass guitar
- Carmelo Torres – percussion
- Mike Zeoli – drums

When playing without Robert Rodriguez, the band is known as Del Castillo.

Guest artists include:

- Patricia Vonne (Rodriguez's sister co-wrote and performed on "Severina")
- Salma Hayek (performed "Siente Mi Amor")
- Tito Larriva (wrote and performed "Alacran y Pistolero")
- Nataly Pena

== Discography ==
=== Albums ===
- Mexican Spaghetti Western (2004)

=== Soundtrack appearances ===
- Once Upon a Time in Mexico (2003)
- Mexico and Mariachis (2004)
- Kill Bill Vol. 2 (2004)
- Grindhouse: Planet Terror (2007)
- Hell Ride (2008)
- Machete (2010)
