= Carmelo Torres =

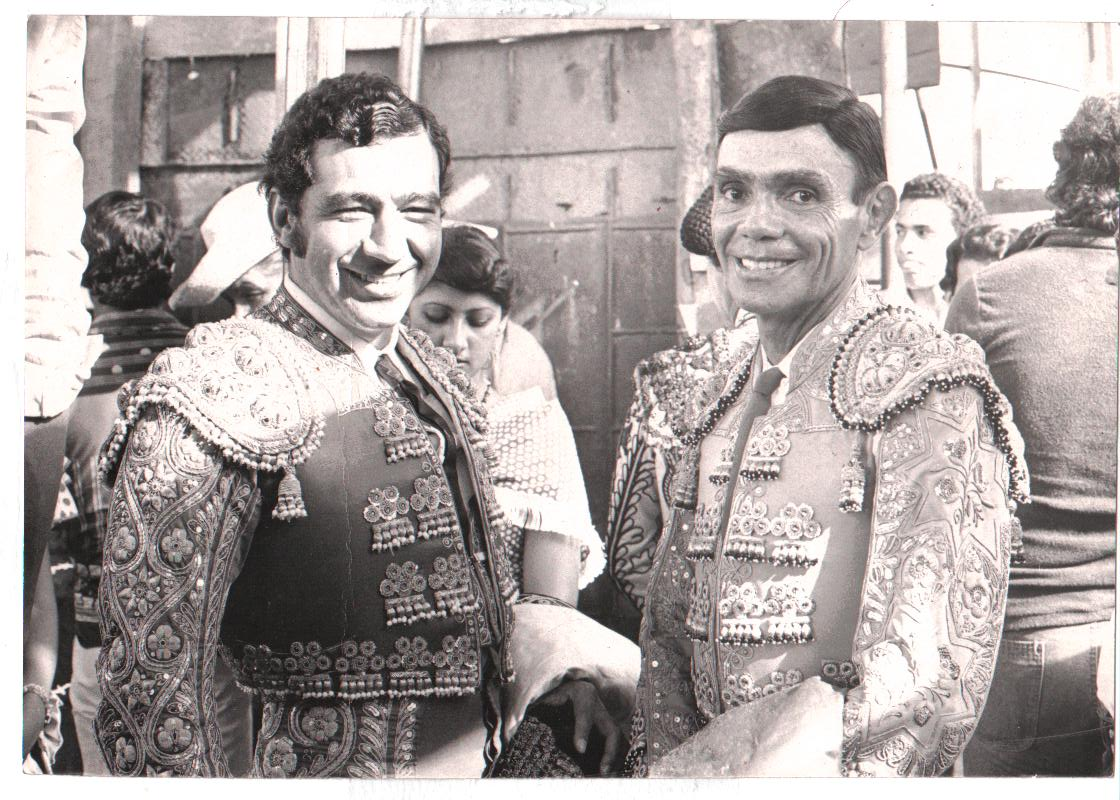
Carmelo Torres, right, with matador Manolo Martinez Xico, Veracruz, 1981, Photo Cat Fletcher

Bernardo del Carmen Fregoso Cázares, who worked and lived under the name Carmelo Torres Fregoso (July 16, 1927 in La Barca, Jalisco, Mexico – January 29, 2003 in Caracas, Venezuela), was a matador, businessman, journalist, author and TV producer. He lived in Venezuela from 1952. His first bullfight as "matador" was in Barranquilla, Colombia, in 1949 and last in Nezahualcóyotl City, Mexico, in 1986. With 37 years of uninterrupted activity this was one of the world's longest careers as a matador. Only son CAT Fletcher known as Carlos Alfredo Torres Fletcher. Son of Carmelo Torres and Miriam Fletcher.

== Business career ==
He was the founder of "Lucy Venetian Blinds" (1952–1982) and manager for Levolor-Lorentzen in South America (1969–1982). He introduced the concept of miniblinds into the South American market with the "Magic Wand"'

== Manager of bullfighters and stockbreeders ==
From 1960 to 1982 he managed and represented many figures of the world of bullfighting including Luis Miguel Dominguín, Manolo Martínez, Eloy Cavazos, Palomo Linares, Cesar Girón, Ortega Cano, Pepe Cáceres, Ernesto San Román and represented Mexican stockbreeders in Venezuela; Los Martínez, Javier Garfias, San Martin and The Glory. For this work and his friendship with Mexican president José López Portillo and Venezuelan presidents Rafael Caldera and Carlos Andrés Pérez he was also known as "The Bullfighting Diplomat". In 1959 Miguel Aceves Mejía plays the role of a bullfighter named Carmelo Torres in the Mexican hit movie Stray Bullet (Bala Perdida). This shows his fame as a manager of bullfighters. He also was a pioneer on worldwide advertising for bullfighters, in 1966 Carmelo Torres travelled in his first around the world tour loaded with his swords and suits been interviewed in many of his stops ending that travel in Spain, that was the year of the Soccer World Cup in England. During that trip, the slogan for the advertising campaign in the "Dígame" madrilean magazine was "Carmelo Torres, a world tour to fight in Spain".

== Journalism and television ==
Torres founded in 1979 with his son Cat Fletcher, Video Bullfighting System, the first business specializing in recording bullfights in Venezuela. They were the official cameramen of the most important figures in bullfighting of that time. Their business changed its name to International Television Studios (México-Miami-Atlanta-Caracas) in 1982 to reflect its diversification into other fields of broadcasting.

He was bullfighting correspondent of Venezuelan Television in 1979 and 1980 and for the Mexican Channel 13 XHDF from 1979 to 1982. With Felo Gimenez he co-produced bullfighting programs for Sports Venevisión. He was executive producer of the documentary Sport in Mexico City and its Function in the Social Development of the Population which won the UNESCO Prize in 1982. From 1982 to 1985 he contributed to the program Bulls and Bullfighters XEIPN-TV, Once-TV channel 11 Mexico (1982–1985). His last production was The Bulls in the World (2002).

As bullfighting columnist for the newspaper El Universal from 1970 to 1973 he wrote under the penname Cartof. He was also a correspondent for the Mexican paper El Redondel and the Spanish Digame.

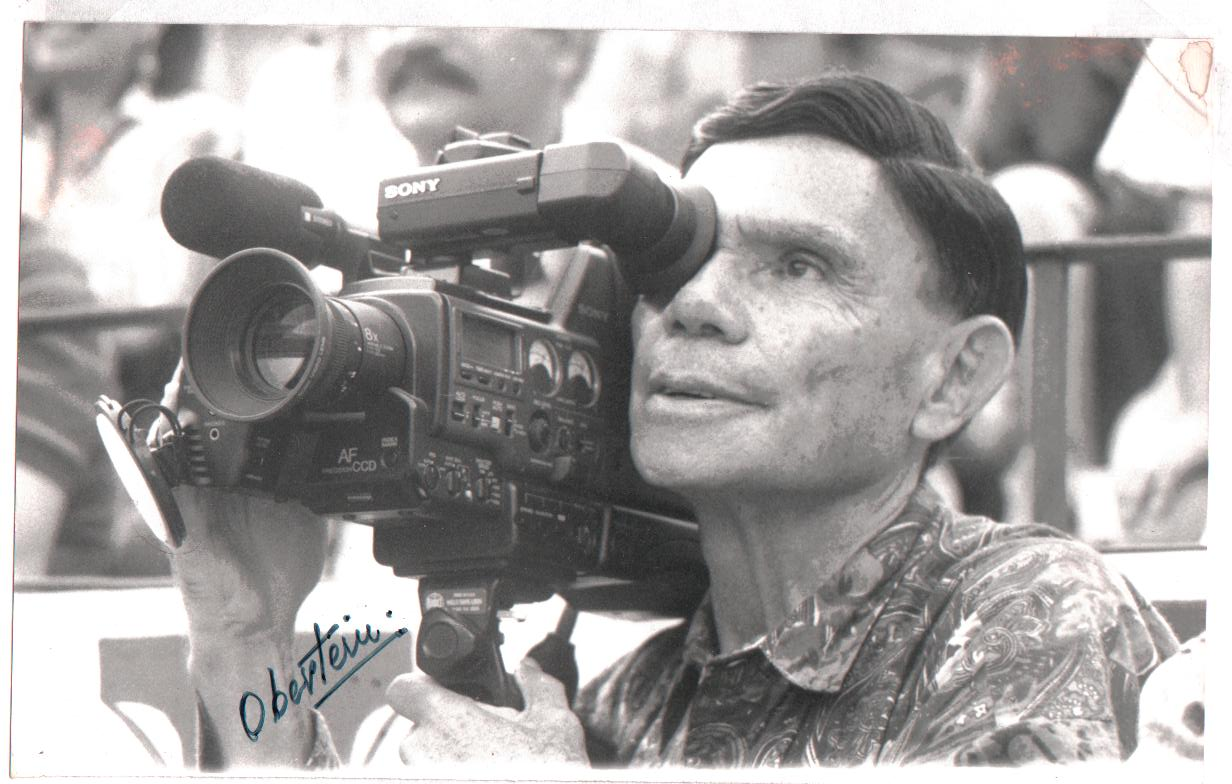
Carmelo Torres as cameraman, photo César Obertein collection Cat Fletcher

== Literary career ==
Carmelo Torres' first unpublished work was called "Broken Illusion", a novel, which he did not finish writing.

In Mexico he wrote under the nickname "Granero", a famous matador killed by a bull named "Pocapena" (Little ashame). Carmelo Torres says of this: "- Granero was killed by "little shame" and I have very little shame to be a writer.

Dr Pepe Cabello published "Redondel de Ilusiones" based on the chronicles that, written as Cartof, were in the newspaper "El Universal" of Caracas. Carmelo Torres co-wrote with Dr Pepe Cabello a book called Illusions Ring.

In 1991 "Boldness" (Audacia) is published, Carmelo Torres being the author, under the seal of International Television Studios. This was his third work and his second to be printed.

== Family ==
His only son was TV producer CAT Fletcher (Carlos Alfredo Torres Fletcher) and his brother was the composer Teddy Fregoso and the American singer Nathaniel from the rock band The Blood Arm was a nephew.

== Death ==
He died from complications caused by Parkinson's disease, caused by an old cerebral wound due to a bullfight.
