= Montana Skies =

Former cello and guitar duo

- Years active: 2004 - 2016
- Members: Jonathan and Jennifer

Montana Skies is cello-and-guitar musician duo from Georgia.

Their name is a metaphor for musical freedom, and they follow their creative instincts beyond traditional boundaries. In concert, they play music from Pink Floyd and Rush to Vivaldi and "The House of the Rising Sun, as well as original works that have been featured on NPR and Travel Channel. Montana Skies has toured across the United States as well as Canada, Asia, and Russia. Their music combines elements of classical technique, jazz improv, and rock n' roll. Member Jonathan plays the guitar, and member Jennifer plays the electric cello.

== History of the band ==
Jonathan and Jennifer met while studying music at the University of Georgia. A shared devotion to their music inspired them to work together. Unable to discover much classical cello guitar music, they formed Montana Skies, creating a unique style of music that would garner instant recognition and praise. Jonathan explains: "The fact that 'ready-made' repertoire is not available for our combination of instruments is really what pushes us to be more creative with our music. We love composing and arranging, and appreciate the opportunity to present old favorites, and newer music, to our audiences."

== Today ==
Montana Skies maintains an active touring schedule. They have performed at the Moscow International Auto Show in Russia, the Seoul Arts Center (2,500 seats) in South Korea, Great Falls Civic Auditorium (1,800 seats) in Montana, the Tanner Amphitheater in Mt. Zion, Utah, and the Morrison Center in Boise, Idaho (Backstage series).

Jonathan's full length instructional book and CD, "Getting Into Fingerstyle Guitar" was published in 2002 by Mel-Bay Publications. Jennifer is an NS Design artist and has been featured in the NS electric cello ad campaigns.

The group disbanded near the end of 2016.

== See also ==
- List of ambient music artists
