= The Hyannis Sound =

American a cappella group

Hyannis Sound
- Origin: Hyannis, Massachusetts
- Genres: A cappella, pop, R&B
- Years active: 1994–present
- Members: Bailey Reese (Indiana University '26); Jack Eyles (William and Mary '26); Earl McBride (UNC '24); Corey Bast (University of Maryland '26 & '27); Graham Carlson (University of Illinois Urbana-Champaign '28); Jaylan Garcia (JMU '27); Anthony Yeh (University of Texas at Austin '27); James Rasser (University of Nebraska-Lincoln '27); Charlie Tavolato (University of St Andrews '27); Roman Newhouse (UMich '26)
- Website: www.hyannissound.org

The Hyannis Sound is an a cappella group from the United States.

Founded in 1994, Hyannis Sound has received recognition from the Recorded A Cappella Review Board and the Contemporary A Cappella Society. The group performs regularly and has become a part of the Cape Cod music scene.

During the COVID-19 pandemic in 2020, Hyannis Sound gained a wider audience through TikTok. They have since partnered with brands like Nerds and were featured in Glamour's You Sang. My Song series featuring Alicia Keys, after their cover of "Fallin'," received over 12 million views on TikTok.

== History ==
Hyannis Sound was founded in 1994 by Townsend Belisle. Inspired by the success of the Vineyard Sound, (Note: Vineyard Sound: https://www.vineyardsound.org/) which he also founded and produced, Belisle formed a similar group on Cape Cod. The group rented a house in Hyannis where they lived together. After years of performances, the group became a performing ensemble on the Cape.

The group currently holds four weekly concerts in areas extending from Falmouth to Chatham and is a registered non-profit corporation in Massachusetts.

In 2020, the COVID-19 pandemic threatened the group's ability to perform. The nine members of Hyannis Sound quarantined together at their Cape Cod home and launched a virtual concert series. Over the summer, the group gained nearly 700,000 followers across Facebook, Instagram, and TikTok.

== Recordings ==
The group has recorded sixteen albums to date. In 2003, the group also began releasing an annual CD titled, Bootleg, with songs recorded mid-summer from one show and released later in the year.

Hyannis Sound has performed the National Anthem at Fenway Park and various Cape Cod League games. They have been featured in publications including The Boston Globe, Glamour, Cape Cod Times, and Martha Stewart Weddings.

On August 1, 2020, Hyannis Sound released a recording and video of "O-o-h Child" by the Five Stairsteps featuring over 60 alumni, including members from the group's founding lineup.

Studio Album	Year released	Singers featured
Back to Back	2023	Matt Chiu, Xavier Cornell, Logan Dawson, Jimmy Fitzgibbons, Savidu Geevaratne, Jarell Green, Jacob Lamb, Chad Marge, Max Pinson, Cristian Ramos, Jordan Rubenstein, Eric Tarlin, Colin Watts
Detour	2021	Cahleb Derry, Jimmy Fitzgibbons, Cristian Ramos, Jacob Lamb, Savidu Geevaratne, Jarell Green, Jordan Rubenstein, Colin Watts, Ben Vance, Brendan Jacob Smith, Beckett Azevedo, Peter Carboni, Nolan Roche, Matt Goldstein, Will Wolz
Always / Sometimes	2019	Ben Vance, Brendan Jacob Smith, Beckett Azevedo, Matt Goldstein, Peter Carboni, Nolan Roche, Will Wolz, Mark Farnum, Anthony Rodriguez, Jason Berk, Jared Graveley, Ryan LaForest, Grayson Kilgo
Boys of Summer	2017	Mark Farnum, Anthony Rodriguez, Avi Montanez, Jason Berk, Jared Graveley, Ryan LaForest, Grayson Kilgo, Jon Smith, Nick Oberlies, Alex Spears, Nick Cipriano, Mike Leona, Sean Switzer
H2O	2015	Alex Spears, Chris Pucci, Jon Smith, Mike Leona, Nick Cafero, Nick Cipriano, Nick Oberlies, Devon Barley, Jackson Thea, Sean Switzer, Noah Berg, Jared Suresky, Liam Fennecken, Dan Spector, Andy Degan, Brandon Borror-Chappell, Marc Whittington
Over The Bridge	2013	Noah Berg, Jared Suresky, Liam Fennecken, Dan Spector, Andy Degan, Mike Hubbard, Mike Hilliker, Brandon Borror-Chappell, Marc Whittington, Jim Hogan, Colin Egan, Kevin Pidgeon, Joe Whitney, Brendan Mason
High Tide	2011	Colin Egan, Kevin Pidgeon, Joe Whitney, Brendan Mason, Alfredo Austin, Nate Tao, Seth Ohrn, Phil Landry, Brian O'Shaugnessy, Jeff Eames, Dave Snell
On The Clock	2009	Alfredo Austin, Nate Tao, Seth Ohrn, Patrick Lundquist, Phil Landry, Brian O'Shaugnessy, Jeff Eames, Dave Snell, Tyler Trepp, Andy Delong, Rob Powers, Cooper Cerulo, Tim Bongiovanni, Micah Christian
Shirt! Tie! Khaki!	2007	Tyler Trepp, Andy Delong, Rob Powers, Matt Labak, Doug Frasier, Cooper Cerulo, Tim Bongiovanni, Paul Toms, Joey Akl, Arjun Jaikumar, Micah Christian
Route 6	2005	Micah Christian, Ed Boyer, Collins Ward, Mark Manley, Greg Binstock, Victor Sandman, Aithan Shapira, James Harrington, Eric Fosbury, Dylan McDonald
Cape Standard Time	2003	Mark Manley, Greg Binstock, Victor Sandman, Aithan Shapira, James Harrington, Rupak Ahuja, Eric Fosbury, Dylan McDonald, Darrel Belch, Mark Hannah, Jason Taylor, Matt Henderson, Matt Wrobel, Samrat Chakrabarti
110	2001	Rupak Ahuja, Eric Fosbury, Dylan McDonald, Darrel Belch, Mark Hannah, Jason Taylor, Matt Henderson, Matt Wrobel, Dave Petrelli, Samrat Chakrabarti, James Caran, Bill Caleo, Mike LeBlanc
