= Estas Tonne =

International guitarist (born 1975)

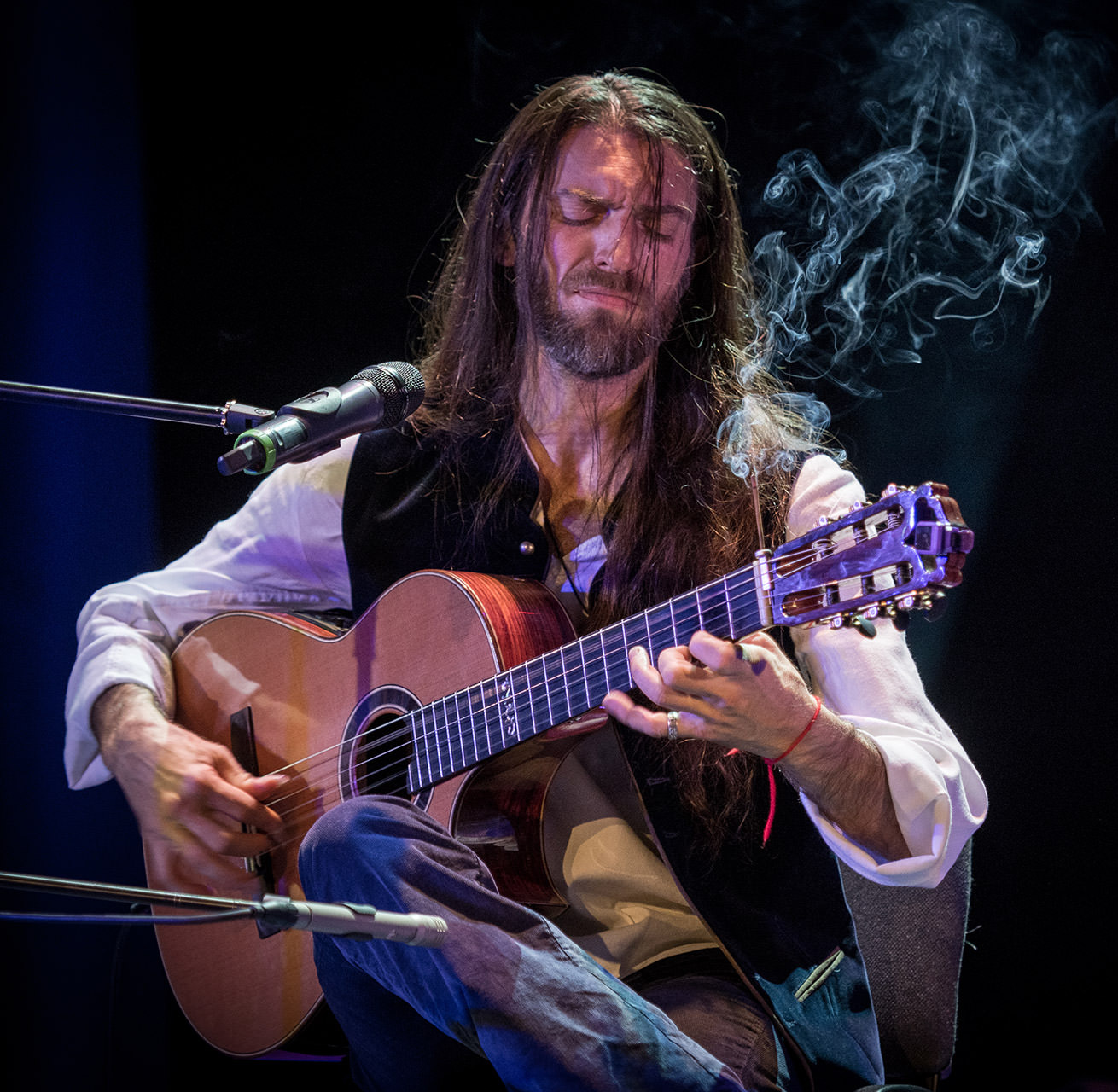
- Tonne in 2017

Background information
- Born: Stanislav Tonne; 24 April 1975 (age 50); Zaporizhzhia, Ukrainian SSR, Soviet Union
- Genres: Classical guitar; Romani music; fingerstyle guitar
- Occupation: Musician
- Instruments: Guitar; flute
- Years active: 2002–present
- Website: estastonne.com

Estas Tonne (born 24 April 1975) is a musician who describes himself as a "modern-day troubadour".

== Biography ==
Born Stanislav Tonne in 1975 in the Ukrainian Soviet Socialist Republic, he is of Jewish and German ancestry. He took up the guitar at the age of eight and started to study classical music at the local music school. After his family moved to Israel in 1990, Tonne stopped playing for eleven years. In September 2001, he moved to New York City and resumed playing the guitar in a duo with violinist and street musician Michael Shulman. He eventually began to travel as a solo musician and has since performed around the world, as well as playing at street, yoga, art, or other festivals.

Throughout his musical career, Tonne has collaborated with a number of notable musicians, including Michael Shrieve. He has performed at numerous distinguished venues, including the Royal Theater Carré in Amsterdam, the BMCC Tribeca Performing Arts Center in New York City, Union Chapel in London, and the Palace of Fine Arts in San Francisco.

== Trivia ==
Tonne makes a brief appearance in the 2017 Claude Lelouch comedy film Everyone's Life as a street busker.

== Discography ==
Studio albums

- Black and White World – with Michael Shulman (2002)
- Dragon of Delight, Vol. II (2004)
- 13 Songs of Truth (2008)
- Bohemian Skies (2009)
- Place of the Gods (2011)
- Internal Flight (2013)
- Mother of Souls – Soundscape of Life – featuring Cosmic Family (2016)
- Time of the Sixth Sun: Sacred Transmissions (Remixed) – original documentary soundtrack, with Tobias (2021)
- Anthology, Vol. III (Acoustic) (2023)
- Old Style (2025)

Live albums

- The Inside Movie (2012)
- Live in Odeon (2012)
- Internal Flight – Live at Garavasara Festival (2013)
- Live in ULM – Outer ◦ Inner – double album (2018)
- Space Creation (feat. Jonatan Bar Rashi – Live in Zurich) (2021)
- Anthology, Vol. I & Vol. II (2021)
