= Patricia Vonne =

American singer

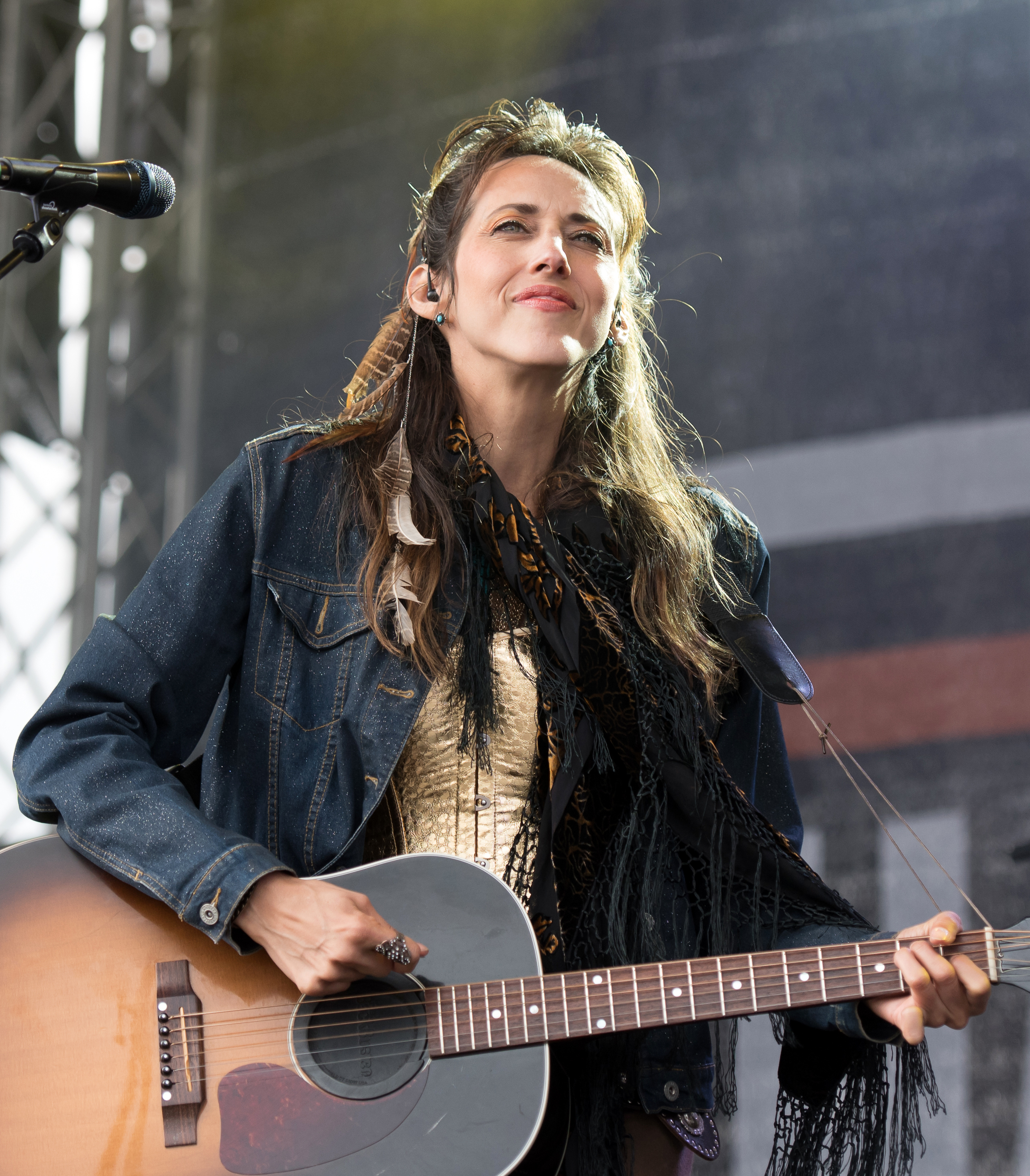
- Vonne performing in 2017

Background information
- Born: Patricia Vonne Rodriguez; December 19, 1969 (age 56); San Antonio, Texas, U.S.
- Genres: Roots rock; Latin; country
- Occupations: Singer, actress, songwriter, animator
- Years active: 1990–present
- Website: patriciavonne.com

Patricia Vonne (née Rodriguez; born December 19, 1969) is an American singer and actress.

== Biography ==
A native of San Antonio, Texas, Vonne is the sister of filmmaker Robert Rodriguez and moved to New York City in 1990–2001 to pursue her artistic ambitions. She worked in Europe and the U.S., featured in the 2005 film Sin City as Dallas (aka Zorro Girl), Spy Kids, Desperado, Machete Kills, Four Rooms, and appeared in national/international commercials and other film work. She formed a band, which performed on the New York circuit from 1998 to 2001. She then relocated to her native Texas, from where she tours in the U.S., Mexico and Europe including the World Expo in Japan, Montreux Jazz Festival in Switzerland, Kennedy Center in Washington D.C., Grand Ole Opry and United Nations in NYC for Artists United to help stop human trafficking.

In 2020, she released The Texicana Mamas, a debut album in collaboration with Tish Hinojosa and Stephanie Urbina Jones.

In 2021, she released her eighth studio album My Favorite Holiday on her own Bandolera Records, with a cast including Rubén Blades, David Grissom, Rosie Flores, Stephen Ferrone (Tom Petty), Carmine Rojas (David Bowie), Thommy Price (Billy Idol), Scott Plunkett on piano, Rowland Salley on bass (Chris Isaak) and Johnny Reno on saxophone.

She toured as a member of Tito & Tarantula, the band featured in the film From Dusk till Dawn in 2002. Her song "Traeme Paz" was featured in the film Once Upon a Time in Mexico.

In 2026 Vonne won the prestigious Lennon Award for “Will You Ever Know” featured on her upcoming 10th album (2026)“My Heart’s Got a Mind of Its Own”. The title track is a co-write with her longtime heroes Chris Isaak and Johnny Reno.

== Discography ==
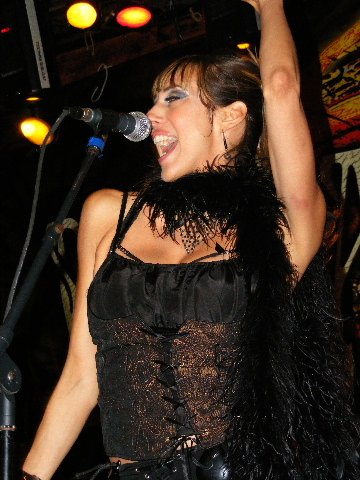
Vonne at Antone's, Austin, Texas, 2009

=== Self ===
- Patricia Vonne (2003)
- Guitars And Castanets (2005)
- Firebird (2007)
- Worth It (2010)
- Rattle My Cage (2013)
- Viva Bandolera (2015)
- Top of the Mountain (2018)
- My Favorite Holiday (2021)
- Live From Austin Texas (2024)
- My Heart’s Got A Mind Of Its Own (2026)

=== The Texicana Mamas (Patricia Vonne, Tish Hinojosa, Stephanie Urbina Jones) ===
- The Texicana Mamas (2020, self-released, internet only)
- LAS VALENTINAS- (2019) released by Rivertale Productions Italy

== Filmography ==
=== Actress ===
- Desperado (1995) as Bar Girl
- Four Rooms (1995) (as Patricia Vonne Rodriguez) as Corpse (segment "The Misbehavers")
- Spy Kids (2001) as Spy Bridesmaid
- El Segundo (2004) as Maribel
- Sin City (2005) as Dallas
- Heavenly Beauties (2005) as Spanish Dancer
- Sin City: A Dame to Kill For (2014) as Dallas
- Spy Kids: Armageddon (2023) as ATM woman

=== Miscellaneous crew ===
- Spy Kids 2: The Island of Lost Dreams (2002) (ballet choreographer)

=== Self ===
- Patricia Vonne: Concierto Teatro de la Ciudad (2005) (TV) as Herself
