= Emily Bratti =

American ice dancer (born 2002)

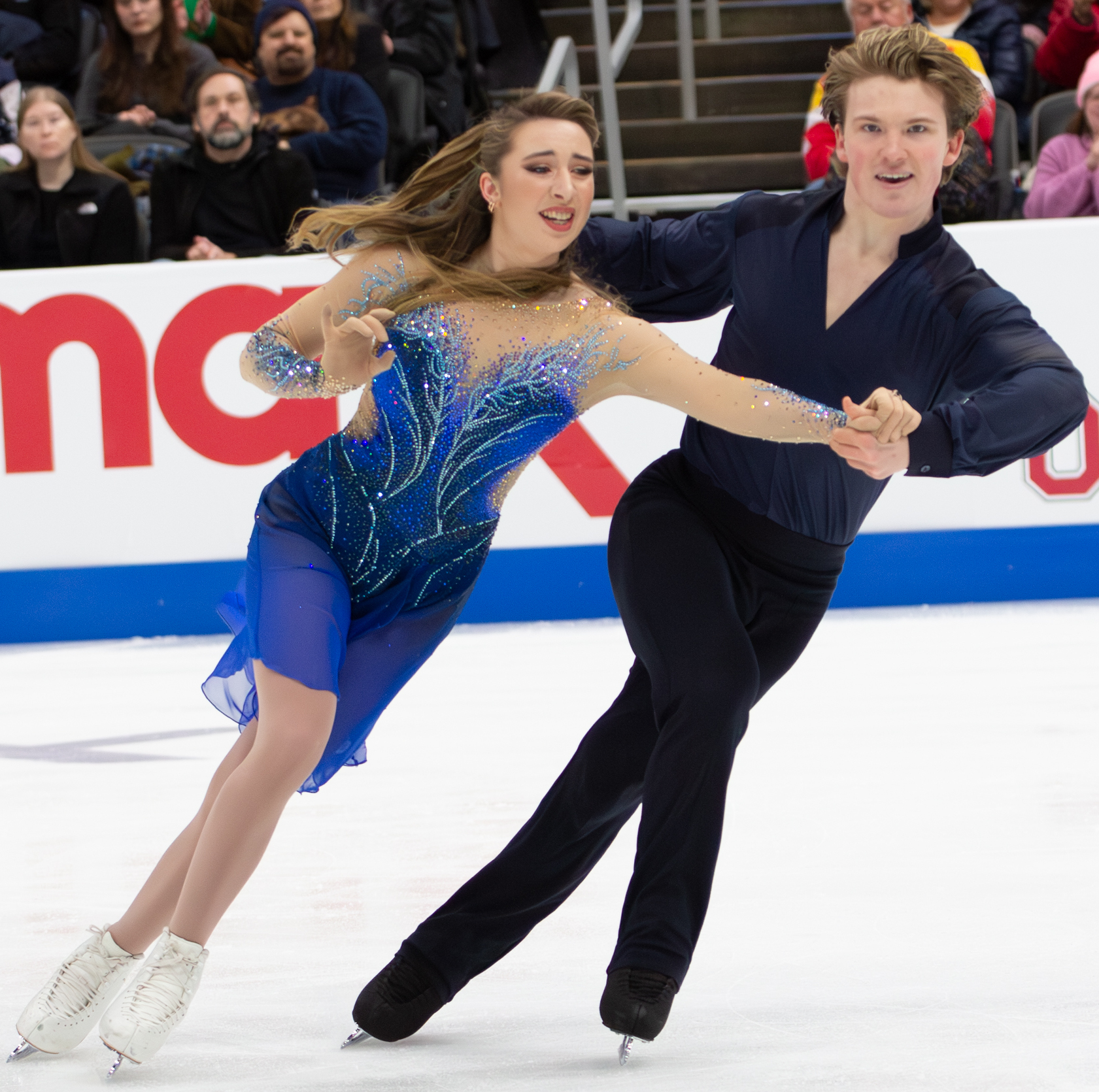
- Bratti and Somerville at the 2026 U.S. Championships

Personal information
- Born: June 11, 2002 (age 24) Washington, D.C., U.S.
- Home town: Canton, Michigan, U.S.
- Height: 5 ft 5 in (1.65 m)

Figure skating career
- Country: United States (since 2021); France (2019–20)
- Discipline: Ice dance
- Partner: Ian Somerville (since 2021); Mathieu Couyras (2019–20)
- Coach: Greg Zuerlein; Tanith White; Brooke O'Keefe; Tony Frazier
- Skating club: Washington FSC
- Began skating: 2007

Medal record
Representing United States
U.S. Championships
Bronze medal – third place	2024 Columbus	Ice dance

Emily Bratti (born June 11, 2002) is an American ice dancer. With her skating partner, Ian Somerville, she is the 2024 U.S. national bronze medalist and 2024 Grand Prix de France bronze medalist.

Bratti previously represented France internationally with her former skating partner, Mathieu Couyras.

== Personal life ==
Bratti was born on June 11, 2002, in Georgetown, Washington, D.C. to Virginia and Michael Bratti. She has a brother named Peter. Bratti graduated from Georgetown Visitation Preparatory School in 2020 and is a student at the University of Michigan as of 2022. She was previously a competitive diver.

== Career ==
=== Early career and partnership with Couyras ===
Bratti began skating in 2007. She competed one season in 2019–20 with Mathieu Couyras for France, including at two Junior Grand Prix events.

==== 2021–22 season ====
In the summer of 2021, Bratti teamed up with Ian Somerville, who she had known for three years while he trained at the same facility with a different partner. They moved to train with Charlie White and Greg Zuerlein at the newly opened Michigan Ice Dance Academy in Canton, Michigan.

Bratti/Somerville made their international debut on the Challenger series at the 2021 CS Cup of Austria, finishing eighth. They went on to place fifth at the 2021 CS Golden Spin of Zagreb. At their senior national debut at the 2022 U.S. Championships, Bratti/Somerville were fifth. This placement earned them an assignment to the 2022 Four Continents Championships in Tallinn, where they also finished fifth. Somerville said he looked forward to the off-season and having more time to improve the partnership.

==== 2022–23 season ====
Bratti and Somerville's summer training was disrupted in June after a fall in a lift resulted in Bratti fracturing a bone in her face and requiring three root canal surgeries to repair damage to her teeth. Eventually they resumed training, though they did not attempt lifts again for over a month afterward.

Bratti/Somerville began the season at the Lake Placid Ice Dance International, coming in fourth. They were fourth as well at the 2022 CS Lombardia Trophy. Invited to make their Grand Prix debut at the 2022 Skate Canada International, the team finished in sixth place. They won the gold medal at the 2022 CS Ice Challenge, their first Challenger title.

Finishing the season at the 2023 U.S. Championships, Bratti/Somerville placed fifth for the second consecutive year.

==== 2023–24 season ====
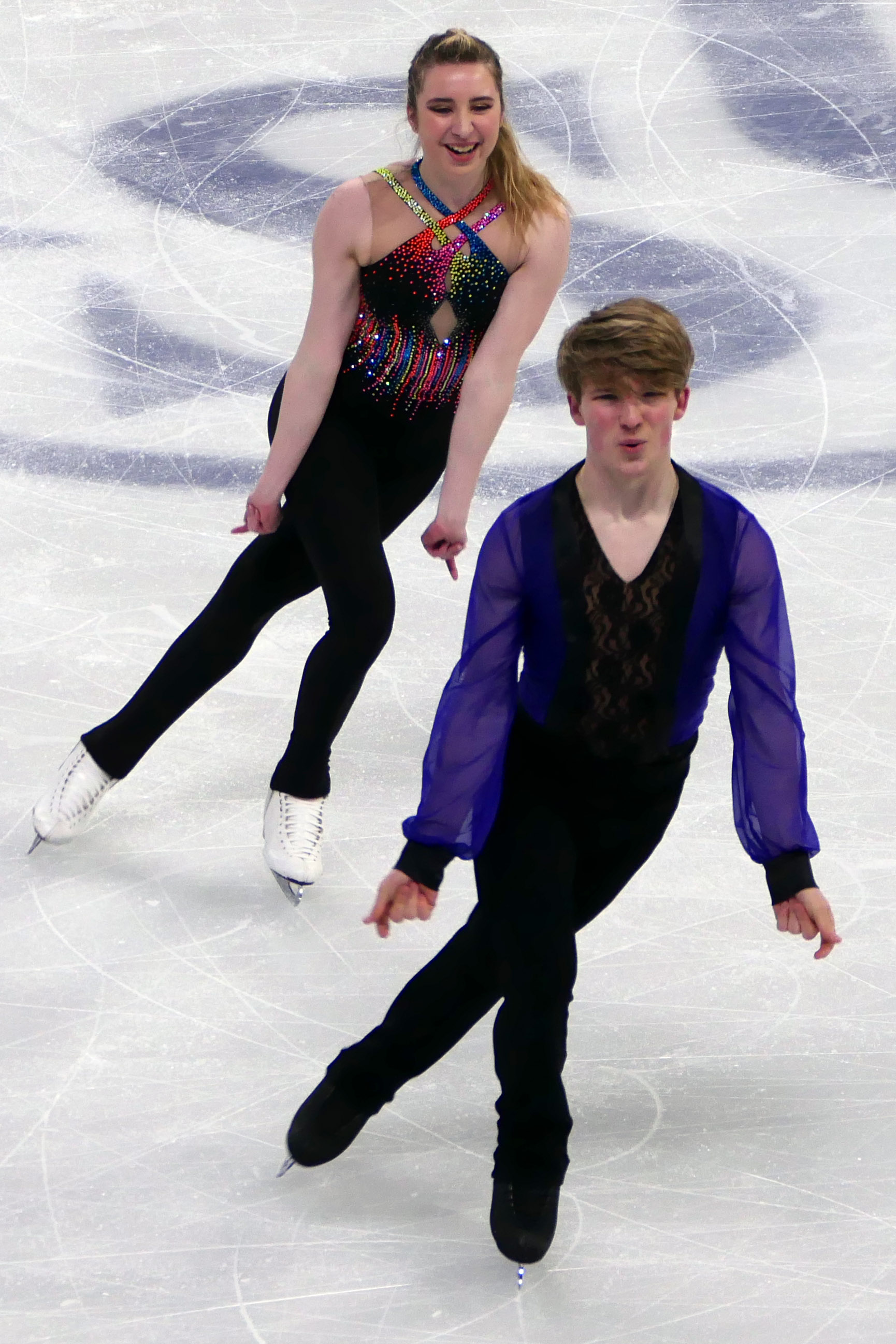
Bratti and Somerville at the 2024 World Championships

On the Challenger circuit, Bratti/Somerville came fourth at the 2023 CS Lombardia Trophy. On the Grand Prix, they were sixth at the 2023 Cup of China. They were sixth as well at the 2023 NHK Trophy, with new personal bests in both the free dance and overall.

In advance of the 2024 U.S. Championships, U.S. Figure Skating opted to name the team for the Four Continents Championships in advance, as they were to be held the week following the national championships. Bratti/Somerville were not included among the entries or as alternates. They would later admit to having found this "pretty disappointing." At the national championship in Columbus, they came fourth in the rhythm dance. Bratti/Somerville then surprised by placing third in the free dance, aided by errors by Green/Parsons, who had been ahead of them after the first segment. This result moved them up to third overall and they received the bronze medal. They had the second-best technical mark in the free dance. Both said they were "in shock" as to the result.

Following their unexpected third-place at the national championship, Bratti/Somerville were named to the American team for the 2024 World Championships in Montreal. Bratti said that their goal was "to show that we belong there and that we should be belonging there in the future, too," while Somerville hoped to "show the joy and energy and excitement of our programs, and show the maturity of the free dance and how far we’ve come as artists." In the rhythm dance in Montreal, the team had a fall at the end of their program, as a result of which they placed twenty-third in the segment, missing qualification to the free dance. Bratti said she was "extremely disappointed" with the error, but otherwise that she felt the program was "the best we've ever skated, and we'll definitely take this as a learning experience going forward."

==== 2024–25 season: First Grand Prix medal ====
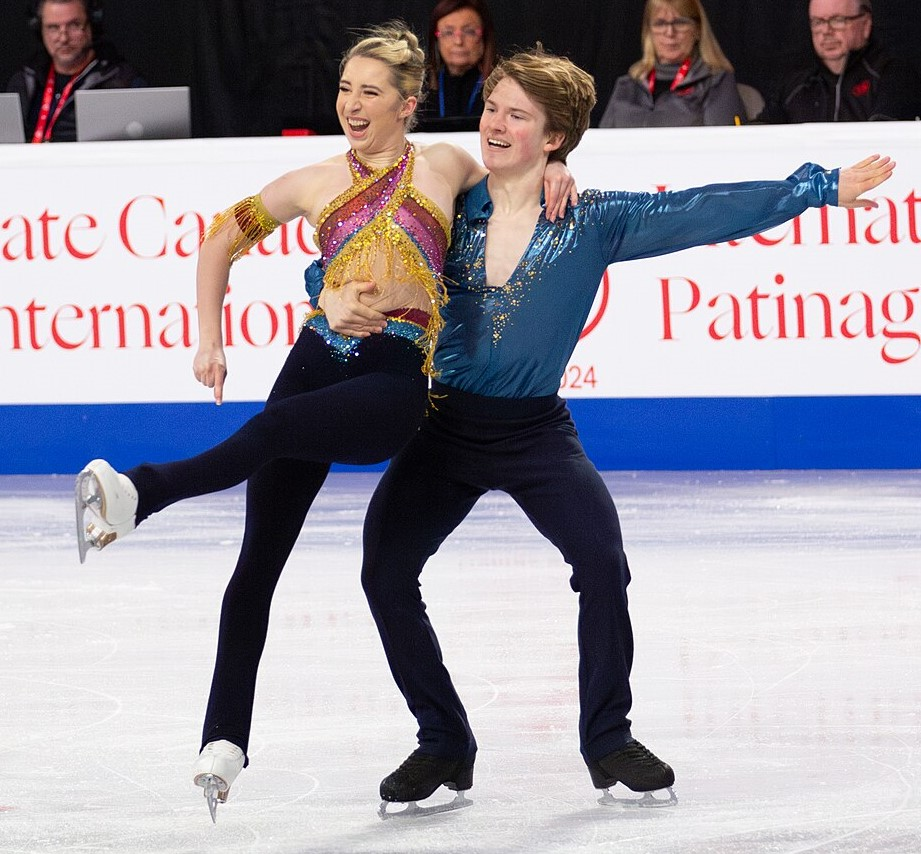
Bratti and Sommerville during their rhythm dance at 2024 Skate Canada International

Bratti/Somerville started the season by winning silver at the 2024 CS Budapest Trophy. They then went on to compete on the 2024–25 Grand Prix circuit, finishing ninth at 2024 Skate Canada International. One week later, Bratti/Somerville won their first Grand Prix medal, a bronze at the 2024 Grand Prix de France. "Wow, I cannot believe it!" said Bratti. "The feelings couldn't be more different than after the last event. We skated more with the mindset that we didn't have anything to lose."

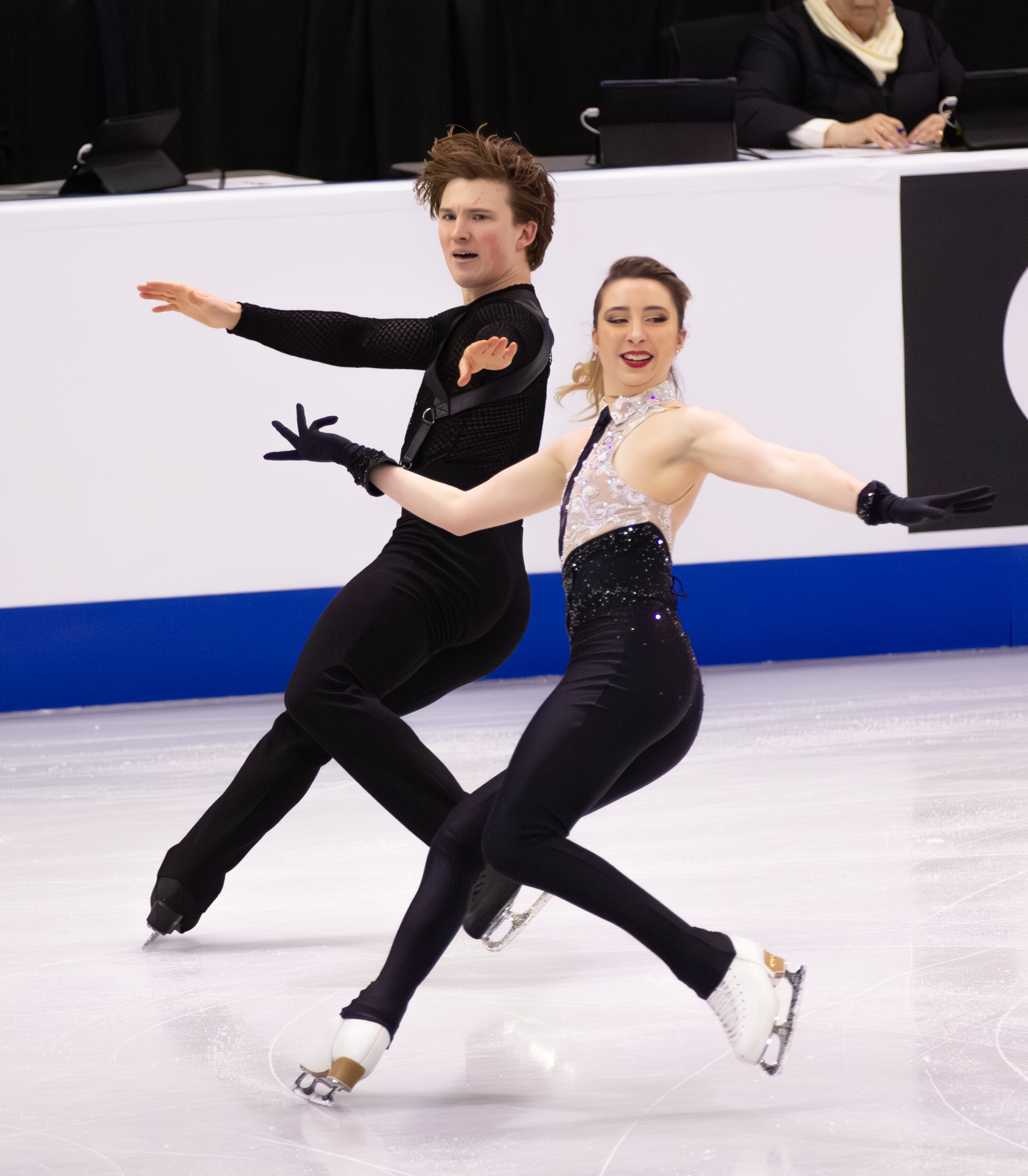
Bratti and Sommerville during their rhythm dance at 2025 Skate Canada International

The team placed sixth overall at the 2025 U.S. Championships.

==== 2025–26 season ====
Bratti/Somerville opened the season by competing on the 2025–26 Grand Prix series, finishing eighth at the 2025 Grand Prix de France and ninth at 2025 Skate Canada International. They followed this up by finishing fourth at the 2025 CS Warsaw Cup and winning gold at the 2025 Santa Claus Cup.

In January, Bratti/Somerville finished fifth at the 2026 U.S. Championships.“We’re really happy with how it went,” Bratti said after the free skate. “It was honestly really hard. I think we really gave everything all weekend, even practices, and we felt at least, I think we both felt, like, very tired from early on."

==== 2026–27 season ====
Bratti/Somerville opened the season by winning the bronze medal at the 2026 CS Lombardia Trophy.

== Programs ==
=== Ice dance with Ian Somerville (for the United States) ===
Season	Rhythm dance	Free dance	Exhibition
2025–2026	Vogue by Madonna; Walk 4 Me Tronco Traxx & Ralphi Rosario choreo. by Greg Zuerlein, Charlie White, Tanith Belbin White, Jean-Luc Baker	Nureyev (from The White Crow) by Ilan Eshkeri performed by Lisa Batiashvili & Dudana Mazmanishvili choreo. by Greg Zuerlein, Charlie White, Tanith Belbin White, Jean-Luc Baker	
2024–2025	Brick House by Commodores; Daddy Cool by Boney M.; Daddy Cool (Lizot remix) by Boney M. & Lizot choreo. by Charlie White, Greg Zuerlein, Tanith Belbin White, Jean-Luc Baker	Ne me quitte pas by Celine Dion & Jacques Brel; Composition by Karl Hugo choreo. by Charlie White, Greg Zuerlein, Tanith Belbin White	When Doves Cry; Let's Go Crazy by Prince choreo. by Charlie White, Greg Zuerlein, Tanith Belbin White; Never Enough (from The Greatest Showman) by Benj Pasek and Justin Paul performed by Loren Allred
2023–2024	When Doves Cry; Let's Go Crazy by Prince choreo. by Charlie White, Greg Zuerlein, Tanith Belbin White	Ne me quitte pas by Celine Dion & Jacques Brel; Composition by Karl Hugo choreo. by Charlie White, Greg Zuerlein, Tanith Belbin White	Goodbye Yellow Brick Road (from Rocketman) performed by Taron Egerton, Jamie Bell; Your Song by Elton John; I'm Still Standing (from Rocketman) performed by Taron Egerton
2022–2023	Samba: Gadda Rio by Club des Belugas, Maxim Illion; Rhumba: Con mi Sombra by S-Tone Inc.; Samba: Hip Hip Chin Chin by Club des Belugas, Maxim Illion choreo. by Charlie White	La La Land; Another Day of Sun; A Lovely Night; Someone in the Crowd by Justin Hurwitz choreo. by Charlie White	
2021–2022	Genius by LSD; Sax by Fleur East	Goodbye Yellow Brick Road (from Rocketman) performed by Taron Egerton, Jamie Bell; Your Song by Elton John; I'm Still Standing (from Rocketman) performed by Taron Egerton	

== Competitive highlights ==
- GP – Event of the ISU Grand Prix Series
- JGP – Event of the ISU Junior Grand Prix Series
- CS – Event of the ISU Challenger Series
- TBD – Assigned
- WD – Withdrew from competition

=== Ice dance with Ian Somerville (for the United States) ===
Competition placements at senior level
Season	2021–22	2022–23	2023–24	2024–25	2025–26	2026–27
World Championships			23rd			
Four Continents Championships	5th					
U.S. Championships	5th	5th	3rd	6th	5th	
GP Cup of China			6th			6th
GP Finland						9th
GP France				3rd	8th	
GP NHK Trophy			6th			
GP Skate Canada		6th		9th	9th	
CS Budapest Trophy				2nd		9th
CS Golden Spin of Zagreb	5th					
CS Ice Challenge	8th	1st				
CS Lombardia Trophy		4th	4th			3rd
CS Tallinn Trophy				2nd		
CS Warsaw Cup					4th	
Lake Placid Ice Dance		4th				
Santa Claus Cup					1st	

=== Ice dance with Mathieu Couyras (for France) ===
Competition placements at junior level
Season	2019–20
French Championships	5th
JGP Croatia	14th
JGP United States	10th
Lake Placid Ice Dance	7th

== Detailed results ==
=== Ice dance with Ian Somerville (for the United States) ===
ISU personal best scores in the +5/-5 GOE System
Segment	Type	Score	Event
Total	TSS	189.91	2024 CS Budapest Trophy
Rhythm dance	TSS	75.37	2024 CS Tallinn Trophy
Rhythm dance	TES	43.31	2024 CS Tallinn Trophy
Rhythm dance	PCS	33.06	2024 CS Budapest Trophy
Free dance	TSS	114.99	2024 CS Budapest Trophy
Free dance	TES	64.39	2024 CS Budapest Trophy
Free dance	PCS	50.60	2024 CS Budapest Trophy

Results in the 2021–22 season
Date	Event	RD		FD		Total	
Date	Event	P	Score	P	Score	P	Score
Nov 11–14, 2021	2021 CS Cup of Austria	7	67.18	9	99.65	8	166.83
Dec 7–11, 2021	(Croatia) 2021 CS Golden Spin of Zagreb	5	68.90	5	103.34	5	172.24
Jan 3–9, 2022	(United States) 2022 U.S. Championships	6	76.70	6	111.28	5	187.98
Jan 18–23, 2022	(Estonia) 2022 Four Continents Championships	6	67.72	5	101.82	5	169.54

Results in the 2022–23 season
Date	Event	RD		FD		Total	
Date	Event	P	Score	P	Score	P	Score
Jul 26–29, 2022	(United States) 2022 Lake Placid Ice Dance International	4	68.63	3	104.72	4	173.35
Sep 16–19, 2022	(Italy) 2022 CS Lombardia Trophy	4	67.79	5	102.75	4	170.54
Oct 28–30, 2022	2022 Skate Canada International	6	70.85	6	108.29	6	179.14
Nov 9–13, 2022	(Austria) 2022 CS Ice Challenge	1	71.61	1	107.46	1	179.07
Jan 23–29, 2023	(United States) 2023 U.S. Championships	6	75.91	6	113.93	5	189.84

Results in the 2023–24 season
Date	Event	RD		FD		Total	
Date	Event	P	Score	P	Score	P	Score
Sep 8–10, 2023	(Italy) 2023 CS Lombardia Trophy	5	68.19	5	109.47	4	177.66
Nov 10–12, 2023	2023 Cup of China	5	71.17	7	108.22	6	179.39
Nov 24–26, 2023	(Japan) 2023 NHK Trophy	6	71.47	6	111.96	6	183.43
Jan 22–28, 2024	(United States) 2024 U.S. Championships	4	78.14	3	118.80	3	196.94
Mar 18–24, 2024	(Canada) 2024 World Championships	23	65.21	–	–	23	65.21

Results in the 2024–25 season
Date	Event	RD		FD		Total	
Date	Event	P	Score	P	Score	P	Score
Oct 11–13, 2024	(Hungary) 2024 CS Budapest Trophy	2	74.92	3	114.99	2	189.91
Oct 25–27, 2024	2024 Skate Canada International	7	71.48	9	101.60	9	173.08
Nov 1–3, 2024	2024 Grand Prix de France	4	72.81	2	113.07	3	185.88
Nov 12–17, 2024	(Estonia) 2024 CS Tallinn Trophy	2	75.37	2	115.49	2	190.86
Jan 20–26, 2025	(United States) 2025 U.S. Championships	7	75.25	5	118.03	6	193.28

Results in the 2025–26 season
Date	Event	RD		FD		Total	
Date	Event	P	Score	P	Score	P	Score
Oct 17–19, 2025	2025 Grand Prix de France	9	65.09	7	107.71	8	172.80
Oct 31 – Nov 2, 2025	2025 Skate Canada International	10	63.22	9	103.10	9	166.32
Nov 19–23, 2025	(Poland) 2025 CS Warsaw Cup	4	72.91	2	114.94	4	187.85
Nov 26–30, 2025	(Hungary) 2025 Santa Claus Cup	1	73.66	2	108.12	1	181.78
Jan 4–11, 2026	(United States) 2026 U.S. Championships	5	79.43	6	117.86	5	197.29

Results in the 2026–27 season
Date	Event	RD		FD		Total	
Date	Event	P	Score	P	Score	P	Score
Sep 17–20, 2026	(Italy) 2026 CS Lombardia Trophy	4	71.24	3	106.79	3	178.03
Oct 16–18, 2026	(Hungary) 2026 CS Budapest Trophy	5	70.58	12	95.39	9	165.97
Nov 6–8, 2026	2026 Cup of China	6	65.04	6	102.93	6	167.97
Nov 20–21, 2026	(Finland) 2026 Finlandia Trophy	8	70.55	9	96.87	9	167.42
