= Ian Somerville =

American ice dancer (born 2000)

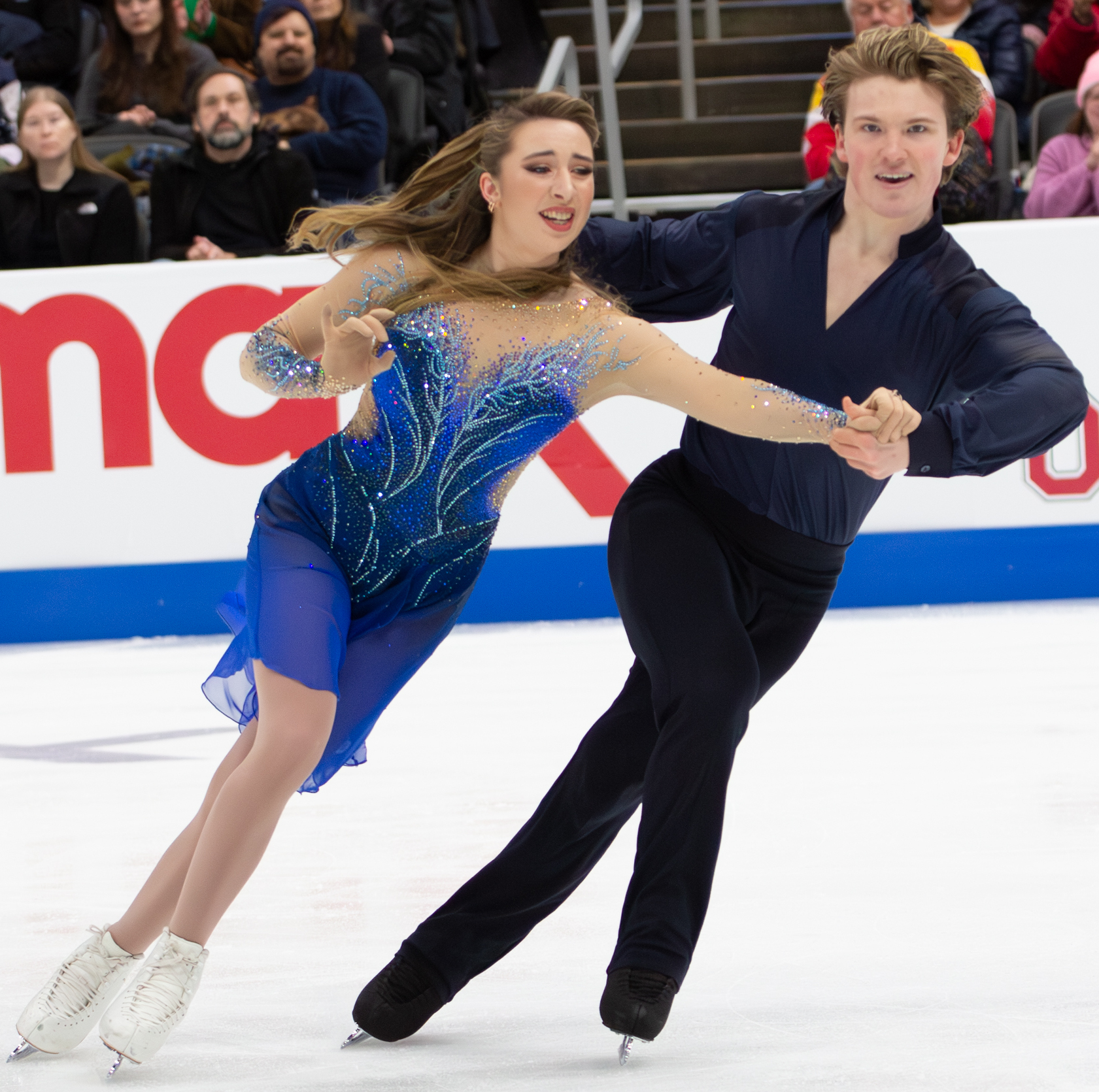
- Bratti and Somerville at the 2026 U.S. Championships

Personal information
- Born: September 1, 2000 (age 26) Washington, D.C., U.S.
- Home town: Cabin John, Maryland, U.S.
- Height: 5 ft 8 in (1.72 m)

Figure skating career
- Country: United States
- Discipline: Ice dance
- Partner: Emily Bratti (since 2021); Katarina DelCamp (2019–21); Eliana Gropman (2008–19)
- Coach: Greg Zuerlein; Tanith White; Brooke O'Keefe; Tony Frazier
- Skating club: Washington Figure Skating Club
- Began skating: 2007

Medal record
U.S. Championships
Bronze medal – third place	2024 Columbus	Ice dance

Ian Somerville (born September 1, 2000) is an American ice dancer. With his skating partner, Emily Bratti, he is the 2024 U.S. national bronze medalist and 2024 Grand Prix de France bronze medalist.

With his former skating partner, Katarina DelCamp, he is the 2021 U.S. junior national bronze medalist. With his former skating partner, Eliana Gropman, he is the 2019 U.S. national junior bronze medalist and the 2018 JGP Slovakia bronze medalist. They placed in the top twelve at the 2019 World Junior Championships.

== Personal life ==
Ian Somerville was born September 1, 2000, in Washington, D.C. to real estate appraisers Catherine and Scott Somerville. He has an older sister named Lauren. Somerville graduated from Walt Whitman High School in Bethesda, Maryland. He is fluent in French and has attended bilingual English/French schools since preschool. Somerville is a fan of the Washington Football Team and owns two Wheaten Terriers named Divi and Margot.

== Career ==
=== Early years and partnership with Gropman ===
Somerville began skating at age four as a recreational activity.

Gropman/Somerville announced their partnership in June 2008. They did not compete during the 2010–11 season after Somerville and his family moved to France for nine months. Together, they are the 2012 U.S. national juvenile and 2013 U.S. national intermediate champions, as well as the 2014 U.S. national novice silver medalists. They did not advance to the 2015 U.S. Championships, after placing fifth at 2015 Eastern Sectionals.

==== 2015–16 season ====
Gropman/Somerville received their first ISU Junior Grand Prix assignment, placing tenth at 2015 JGP United States in Colorado Springs, Colorado. They won bronze at Midwestern Sectionals and finished seventh at the 2016 U.S. Championships. Gropman/Somerville then competed at the 2016 Bavarian Open, where they won silver behind Shevchenko/Eremenko of Russia.

==== 2016–17 season ====
Gropman/Somerville opened their season with the bronze medal at 2016 Lake Placid Ice Dance International behind U.S. teammates Parsons/Parsons and Lewis/Bye. They finished ninth at 2016 JGP France and fifth at 2016 NRW Trophy. Gropman/Somerville won bronze at Eastern Sectionals and finished sixth at the 2016 U.S. Championships.

==== 2017–18 season ====
Gropman/Somerville began the season with a pair of fourth-place finishes at 2017 JGP Australia and 2017 JGP Croatia. They won silver at Eastern Sectionals and earned their first junior national medal, pewter, at the 2017 U.S. Championships.

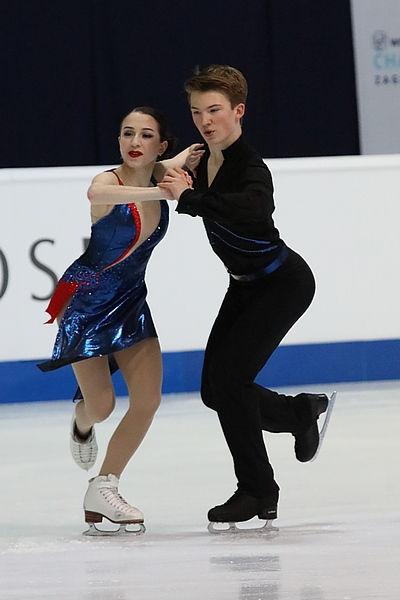
Gropman and Somerville at the 2019 World Junior Championships

==== 2018–19 season: First Junior Grand Prix medal ====
Gropman/Somerville won their first JGP medal, a bronze, at 2018 JGP Slovakia behind Russians Khudaiberdieva/Nazarov and Shanaeva/Naryzhnyy. They placed fifth at 2018 JGP Canada. Gropman/Somerville won gold at Midwestern Sectionals and bronze at the 2019 U.S. Championships. With their result, they were named to the team for the 2019 World Junior Championships for the first time, alongside Green/Green and Nguyen/Kolesnik.

At the 2019 Junior Worlds, Gropman/Somerville were ninth after the rhythm dance but fell to twelfth overall following a thirteenth-place free dance. Somerville and Gropman dissolved the partnership at the end of the season.

=== Partnership with DelCamp ===
==== 2019–20 season ====
Somerville teamed up with Katarina DelCamp in 2019. They placed tenth at 2019 JGP Croatia and fourth at 2019 JGP Italy. DelCamp/Somerville won the bronze medal at the inaugural U.S. Ice Dance Final behind Wolfkostin/Chen and Cesanek/Yehorov. They then finished fifth at the 2020 U.S. Championships and, as a result, were assigned to Egna Dance Trophy. DelCamp/Somerville won their first international medal, silver, at Egna Trophy behind teammates Cesanek/Yehorov.

==== 2020–21 season ====
In their lone event of the pandemic-shortened season, DelCamp/Somerville won the bronze medal at the 2021 U.S. junior championships. Somerville dissolved the partnership afterward.

=== Partnership with Bratti ===
==== 2021–22 season ====
After ending his partnership with DelCamp, Somerville formed a new partnership with Emily Bratti, who he had known for three years while she trained at the same facility with a different partner. They moved to train with Charlie White and Greg Zuerlein at the newly-opened Michigan Ice Dance Academy in Canton, Michigan.

Bratti/Somerville made their international debut on the Challenger series at the 2021 CS Cup of Austria, finishing eighth. They went on to place fifth at the 2021 CS Golden Spin of Zagreb. At their senior national debut at the 2022 U.S. Championships, Bratti/Somerville were fifth. This placement earned them an assignment to the 2022 Four Continents Championships in Tallinn, where they also finished fifth. Somerville said he looked forward to the off-season and having more time to improve the partnership.

==== 2022–23 season ====
Bratti and Somerville's summer training was disrupted in June after a fall in a lift resulted in Bratti fracturing a bone in her face and requiring three root canal surgeries to repair damage to her teeth. Eventually they resumed training, though they did not attempt lifts again for over a month afterward.

Bratti/Somerville began the season at the Lake Placid Ice Dance International, coming in fourth. They were fourth as well at the 2022 CS Lombardia Trophy. Invited to make their Grand Prix debut at the 2022 Skate Canada International, the team finished in sixth place. They won the gold medal at the 2022 CS Ice Challenge, their first Challenger title.

Finishing the season at the 2023 U.S. Championships, Bratti/Somerville placed fifth for the second consecutive year.

==== 2023–24 season ====
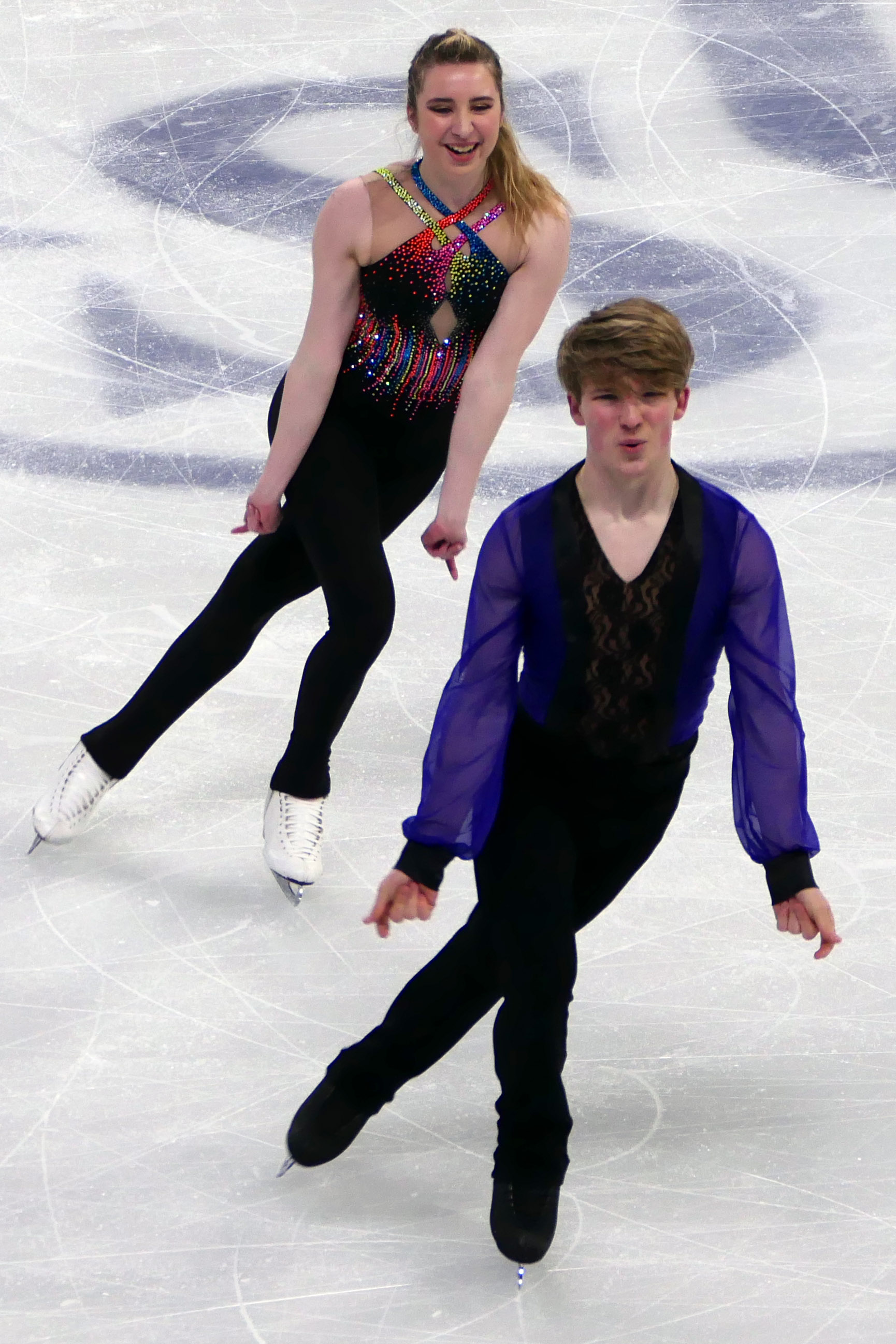
Bratti and Somerville at the 2024 World Championships

On the Challenger circuit, Bratti/Somerville came fourth at the 2023 CS Lombardia Trophy. On the Grand Prix, they were sixth at the 2023 Cup of China. They were sixth as well at the 2023 NHK Trophy, with new personal bests in both the free dance and overall.

In advance of the 2024 U.S. Championships, U.S. Figure Skating opted to name the team for the Four Continents Championships in advance, as they were to be held the week following the national championships. Bratti/Somerville were not included among the entries or as alternates. They would later admit to having found this "pretty disappointing." At the national championship in Columbus, they came fourth in the rhythm dance. Bratti/Somerville then surprised by placing third in the free dance, aided by errors by Green/Parsons, who had been ahead of them after the first segment. This result moved them up to third overall and they received the bronze medal. They had the second-best technical mark in the free dance. Both said they were "in shock" as to the result.

Following their unexpected third-place at the national championship, Bratti/Somerville were named to the American team for the 2024 World Championships in Montreal. Bratti said that their goal was "to show that we belong there and that we should be belonging there in the future, too," while Somerville hoped to "show the joy and energy and excitement of our programs, and show the maturity of the free dance and how far we’ve come as artists." In the rhythm dance in Montreal, the team had a fall at the end of their program, as a result of which they placed twenty-third in the segment, missing qualification to the free dance. Bratti said she was "extremely disappointed" with the error, but otherwise that she felt the program was "the best we've ever skated, and we'll definitely take this as a learning experience going forward."

==== 2024–25 season: First Grand Prix medal ====
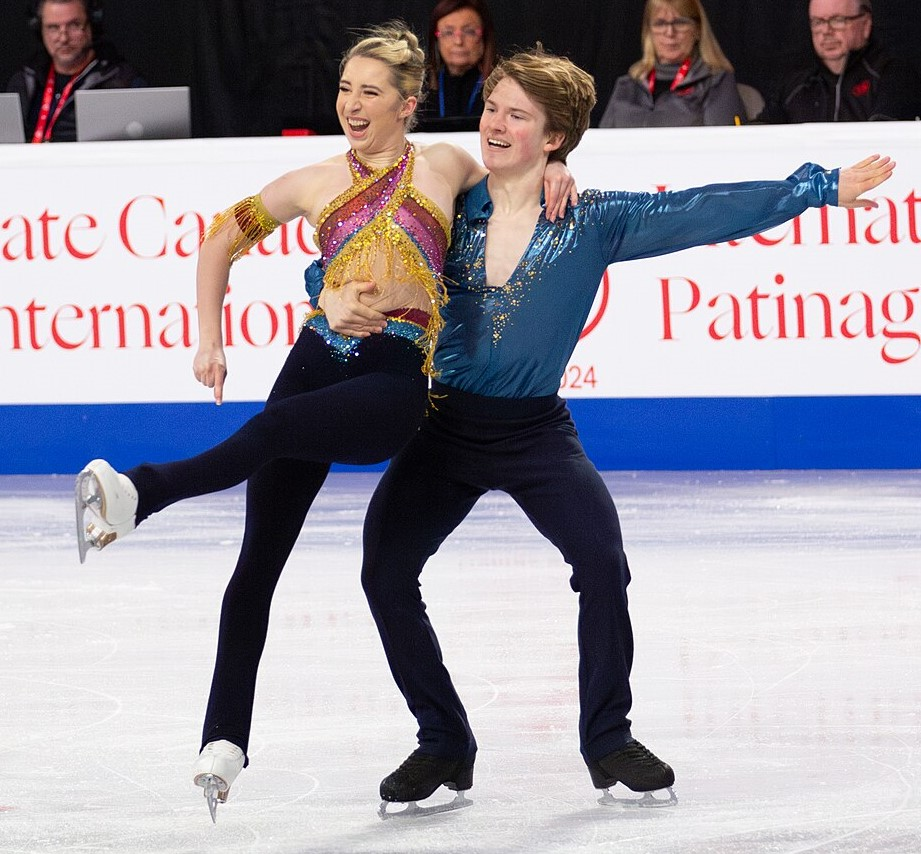
Bratti and Sommerville during their rhythm dance at 2024 Skate Canada International

Bratti/Somerville started the season by winning silver at the 2024 CS Budapest Trophy. They then went on to compete on the 2024–25 Grand Prix circuit, finishing ninth at 2024 Skate Canada International. One week later, Bratti/Somerville won their first Grand Prix medal, a bronze at the 2024 Grand Prix de France. “It feels amazing. I feel like ‘oh my God!'” said Somerville. “I want to remember what our mindset was going into this event because I want to apply it for all our events."

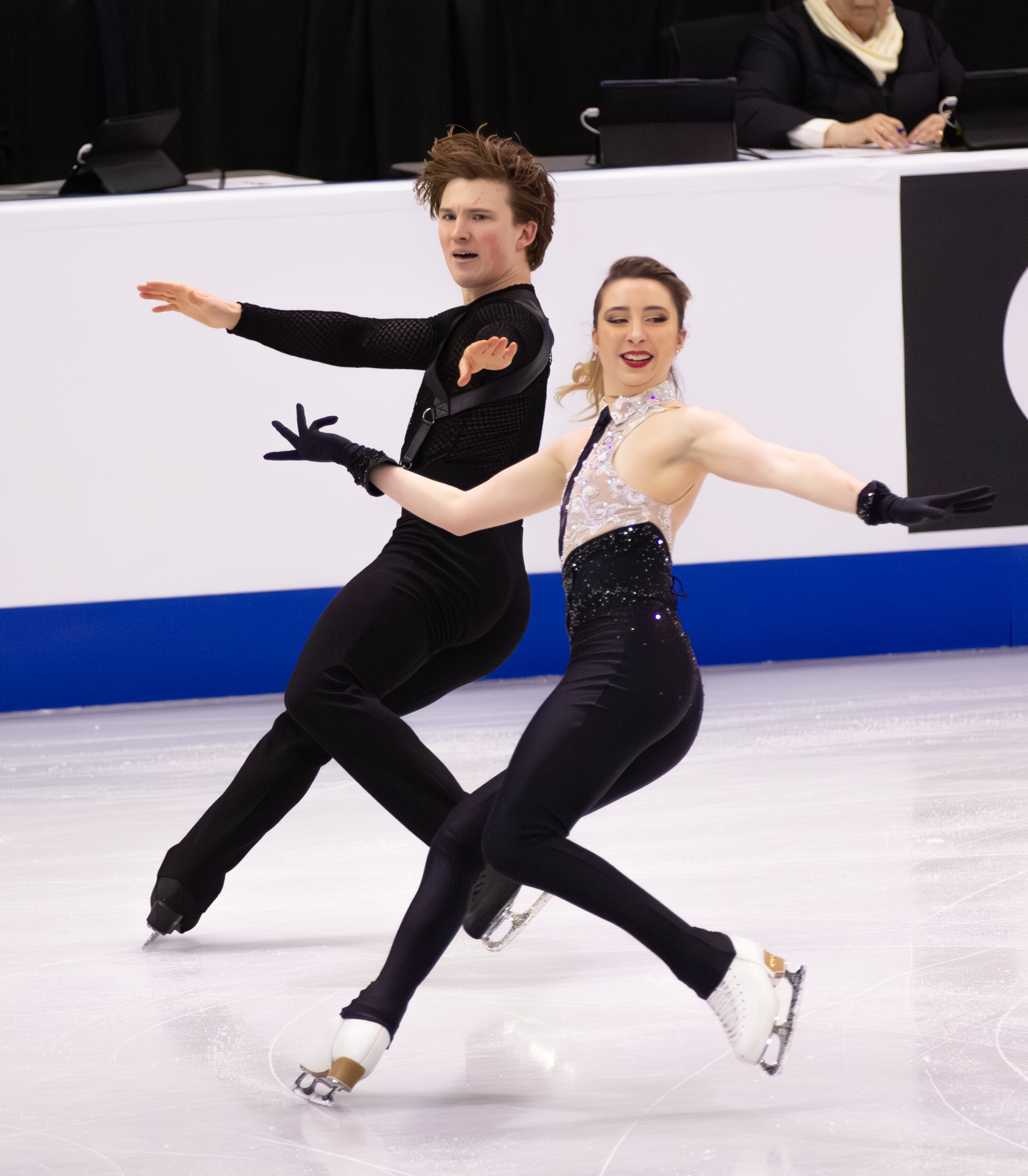
Bratti and Sommerville during their rhythm dance at 2025 Skate Canada International

The team placed sixth overall at the 2025 U.S. Championships.

==== 2025–26 season ====
Bratti/Somerville opened the season by competing on the 2025–26 Grand Prix series, finishing eighth at the 2025 Grand Prix de France and ninth at 2025 Skate Canada International. They followed this up by finishing fourth at the 2025 CS Warsaw Cup and winning gold at the 2025 Santa Claus Cup.

In January, Bratti/Somerville finished fifth at the 2026 U.S. Championships.“We’re really happy with how it went,” Bratti said after the free skate. “It was honestly really hard. I think we really gave everything all weekend, even practices, and we felt at least, I think we both felt, like, very tired from early on."

==== 2026–27 season ====
Bratti and Somerville opened the season by winning the bronze medal at the 2026 CS Lombardia Trophy.

== Programs ==
=== Ice dance with Emily Bratti ===
Season	Rhythm dance	Free dance	Exhibition
2025–2026	Vogue by Madonna; Walk 4 Me Tronco Traxx & Ralphi Rosario choreo. by Greg Zuerlein, Charlie White, Tanith Belbin White, Jean-Luc Baker	Nureyev (from The White Crow) by Ilan Eshkeri performed by Lisa Batiashvili & Dudana Mazmanishvili choreo. by Greg Zuerlein, Charlie White, Tanith Belbin White, Jean-Luc Baker	
2024–2025	Brick House by Commodores; Daddy Cool by Boney M.; Daddy Cool (Lizot remix) by Boney M. & Lizot choreo. by Charlie White, Greg Zuerlein, Tanith Belbin White, Jean-Luc Baker	Ne me quitte pas by Celine Dion & Jacques Brel; Composition by Karl Hugo choreo. by Charlie White, Greg Zuerlein, Tanith Belbin White	When Doves Cry; Let's Go Crazy by Prince choreo. by Charlie White, Greg Zuerlein, Tanith Belbin White; Never Enough (from The Greatest Showman) by Benj Pasek and Justin Paul performed by Loren Allred
2023–2024	When Doves Cry; Let's Go Crazy by Prince choreo. by Charlie White, Greg Zuerlein, Tanith Belbin White	Ne me quitte pas by Celine Dion & Jacques Brel; Composition by Karl Hugo choreo. by Charlie White, Greg Zuerlein, Tanith Belbin White	Goodbye Yellow Brick Road (from Rocketman) performed by Taron Egerton, Jamie Bell; Your Song by Elton John; I'm Still Standing (from Rocketman) performed by Taron Egerton
2022–2023	Samba: Gadda Rio by Club des Belugas, Maxim Illion; Rhumba: Con mi Sombra by S-Tone Inc.; Samba: Hip Hip Chin Chin by Club des Belugas, Maxim Illion choreo. by Charlie White	La La Land; Another Day of Sun; A Lovely Night; Someone in the Crowd by Justin Hurwitz choreo. by Charlie White	
2021–2022	Genius by LSD; Sax by Fleur East	Goodbye Yellow Brick Road (from Rocketman) performed by Taron Egerton, Jamie Bell; Your Song by Elton John; I'm Still Standing (from Rocketman) performed by Taron Egerton	

=== With DelCamp ===
Season	Rhythm dance	Free dance
2019–2020	Foxtrot: City of Stars; Waltz: Planetarium from La La Land by Justin Hurwitz	Rewrite the Stars by The Piano Guys; You Are the Reason by Calum Scott, Corey Sanders, Jon Maguire

=== With Gropman ===
Season	Rhythm dance	Free dance
2018–2019	Tango: Nuevo Tango by Cuarteto Nuevo Tango; Argentine tango: La Cascada by Seoan feat. Kathy; Tango: Nuevo Tango by Cuarteto Nuevo Tango	Bim Bam Boum; Le Bien Qui Fait Mal from Mozart, l'opéra rock by Dove Attia, François Castello, Rodrigue Janois
	Short dance	Free dance
2017–2018	Rhumba: Mas Que Suerte by Beatriz Luengo; Cha-cha: De Hombre A Mujer by Donato & Estéfano; Samba: Samba Hey by El General	Zavedi Me by Hari Mata Hare; Nyah (from Mission: Impossible 2) by Heitor Pereira, Hans Zimmer; No Ronees Mas Conmigo - Tango de la Repompa by Susi
2016–2017	Hip hop: Looking like Danger; Blues: Back to Life by New Kids on the Block; Hip hop: Everybody (Backstreet's Back) by Backstreet Boys	Getting on With It; Equation; Escape (from Le Petit Prince) by Richard Harvey, Hans Zimmer
2015–2016	Waltz: The Story of an Unknown Actor IV. Waltz of Farewell by Alfred Schnittke	Ice Queen by Dinletir; Rebirth 2 by Solace; Ice Queen by Dinletir
2014–2015	Mi Chica by Sarbel; Gitti Gideli by Tarkan	The Reel; Nocturne; Elan by Secret Garden

== Competitive highlights ==
- GP – Event of the ISU Grand Prix Series
- JGP – Event of the ISU Junior Grand Prix Series
- CS – Event of the ISU Challenger Series
- TBD – Assigned
- WD – Withdrew from competition

=== Ice dance with Emily Bratti ===
Competition placements at senior level
Season	2021–22	2022–23	2023–24	2024–25	2025–26	2026–27
World Championships			23rd			
Four Continents Championships	5th					
U.S. Championships	5th	5th	3rd	6th	5th	
GP Cup of China			6th			6th
GP Finland						9th
GP France				3rd	8th	
GP NHK Trophy			6th			
GP Skate Canada		6th		9th	9th	
CS Budapest Trophy				2nd		9th
CS Golden Spin of Zagreb	5th					
CS Ice Challenge	8th	1st				
CS Lombardia Trophy		4th	4th			3rd
CS Tallinn Trophy				2nd		
CS Warsaw Cup					4th	
Lake Placid Ice Dance		4th				
Santa Claus Cup					1st	

=== Ice dance with Katarina Del Camp ===
Competition placements at junior level
Season	2019–20	2020–21
U.S. Championships	5th	3rd
JGP Croatia	10th	
JGP Italy	4th	
Egna Dance Trophy	2nd	

=== Ice dance with Eliana Gropman ===
Competition placements at junior level
Season	2015–16	2016–17	2017–18	2018–19
Worlds Junior Championships				12th
U.S. Championships	7th	6th	4th	3rd
JGP Australia			4th	
JGP Canada				5th
JGP Croatia			4th	
JGP France		9th		
JGP Slovakia				3rd
JGP United States	10th			
Bavarian Open	2nd			
Lake Placid International		3rd		
NRW Trophy		5th		

== Detailed results ==
=== Ice dance with Emily Bratti ===
ISU personal best scores in the +5/-5 GOE System
Segment	Type	Score	Event
Total	TSS	189.91	2024 CS Budapest Trophy
Rhythm dance	TSS	75.37	2024 CS Tallinn Trophy
Rhythm dance	TES	43.31	2024 CS Tallinn Trophy
Rhythm dance	PCS	33.06	2024 CS Budapest Trophy
Free dance	TSS	114.99	2024 CS Budapest Trophy
Free dance	TES	64.39	2024 CS Budapest Trophy
Free dance	PCS	50.60	2024 CS Budapest Trophy

Results in the 2021–22 season
Date	Event	RD		FD		Total	
Date	Event	P	Score	P	Score	P	Score
Nov 11–14, 2021	2021 CS Cup of Austria	7	67.18	9	99.65	8	166.83
Dec 7–11, 2021	(Croatia) 2021 CS Golden Spin of Zagreb	5	68.90	5	103.34	5	172.24
Jan 3–9, 2022	(United States) 2022 U.S. Championships	6	76.70	6	111.28	5	187.98
Jan 18–23, 2022	(Estonia) 2022 Four Continents Championships	6	67.72	5	101.82	5	169.54

Results in the 2022–23 season
Date	Event	RD		FD		Total	
Date	Event	P	Score	P	Score	P	Score
Jul 26–29, 2022	(United States) 2022 Lake Placid Ice Dance International	4	68.63	3	104.72	4	173.35
Sep 16–19, 2022	(Italy) 2022 CS Lombardia Trophy	4	67.79	5	102.75	4	170.54
Oct 28–30, 2022	2022 Skate Canada International	6	70.85	6	108.29	6	179.14
Nov 9–13, 2022	(Austria) 2022 CS Ice Challenge	1	71.61	1	107.46	1	179.07
Jan 23–29, 2023	(United States) 2023 U.S. Championships	6	75.91	6	113.93	5	189.84

Results in the 2023–24 season
Date	Event	RD		FD		Total	
Date	Event	P	Score	P	Score	P	Score
Sep 8–10, 2023	(Italy) 2023 CS Lombardia Trophy	5	68.19	5	109.47	4	177.66
Nov 10–12, 2023	2023 Cup of China	5	71.17	7	108.22	6	179.39
Nov 24–26, 2023	(Japan) 2023 NHK Trophy	6	71.47	6	111.96	6	183.43
Jan 22–28, 2024	(United States) 2024 U.S. Championships	4	78.14	3	118.80	3	196.94
Mar 18–24, 2024	(Canada) 2024 World Championships	23	65.21	—N/a	—N/a	23	65.21

Results in the 2024–25 season
Date	Event	RD		FD		Total	
Date	Event	P	Score	P	Score	P	Score
Oct 11–13, 2024	(Hungary) 2024 CS Budapest Trophy	2	74.92	3	114.99	2	189.91
Oct 25–27, 2024	2024 Skate Canada International	7	71.48	9	101.60	9	173.08
Nov 1–3, 2024	2024 Grand Prix de France	4	72.81	2	113.07	3	185.88
Nov 12–17, 2024	(Estonia) 2024 CS Tallinn Trophy	2	75.37	2	115.49	2	190.86
Jan 20–26, 2025	(United States) 2025 U.S. Championships	7	75.25	5	118.03	6	193.28

Results in the 2025–26 season
Date	Event	RD		FD		Total	
Date	Event	P	Score	P	Score	P	Score
Oct 17–19, 2025	2025 Grand Prix de France	9	65.09	7	107.71	8	172.80
Oct 31 – Nov 2, 2025	2025 Skate Canada International	10	63.22	9	103.10	9	166.32
Nov 19–23, 2025	(Poland) 2025 CS Warsaw Cup	4	72.91	2	114.94	4	187.85
Nov 26–30, 2025	(Hungary) 2025 Santa Claus Cup	1	73.66	2	108.12	1	181.78
Jan 4–11, 2026	(United States) 2026 U.S. Championships	5	79.43	6	117.86	5	197.29

Results in the 2026–27 season
Date	Event	RD		FD		Total	
Date	Event	P	Score	P	Score	P	Score
Sep 17–20, 2026	(Italy) 2026 CS Lombardia Trophy	4	71.24	3	106.79	3	178.03
Oct 16–18, 2026	(Hungary) 2026 CS Budapest Trophy	5	70.58	12	95.39	9	165.97
Nov 6–8, 2026	2026 Cup of China	6	65.04	6	102.93	6	167.97
Nov 20–21, 2026	(Finland) 2026 Finlandia Trophy	8	70.55	9	96.87	9	167.42

=== Ice dance with Katarina Del Camp ===
ISU personal best scores in the +5/-5 GOE System
Segment	Type	Score	Event
Total	TSS	147.05	2019 JGP Italy
Rhythm dance	TSS	58.06	2019 JGP Italy
Rhythm dance	TES	32.86	2019 JGP Italy
Rhythm dance	PCS	25.88	2019 JGP Croatia
Free dance	TSS	88.99	2019 JGP Italy
Free dance	TES	47.67	2019 JGP Italy
Free dance	PCS	41.32	2019 JGP Italy

=== Ice dance with Eliana Gropman ===
ISU personal best scores in the +5/-5 GOE System
Segment	Type	Score	Event
Total	TSS	148.51	2018 JGP Slovakia
Rhythm dance	TSS	59.92	2018 JGP Slovakia
Rhythm dance	TES	33.25	2018 JGP Slovakia
Rhythm dance	PCS	27.11	2019 World Junior Championships
Free dance	TSS	88.59	2018 JGP Slovakia
Free dance	TES	47.52	2018 JGP Slovakia
Free dance	PCS	41.07	2018 JGP Slovakia
