= Jean-Luc Baker =

American ice dancer (born 1993)

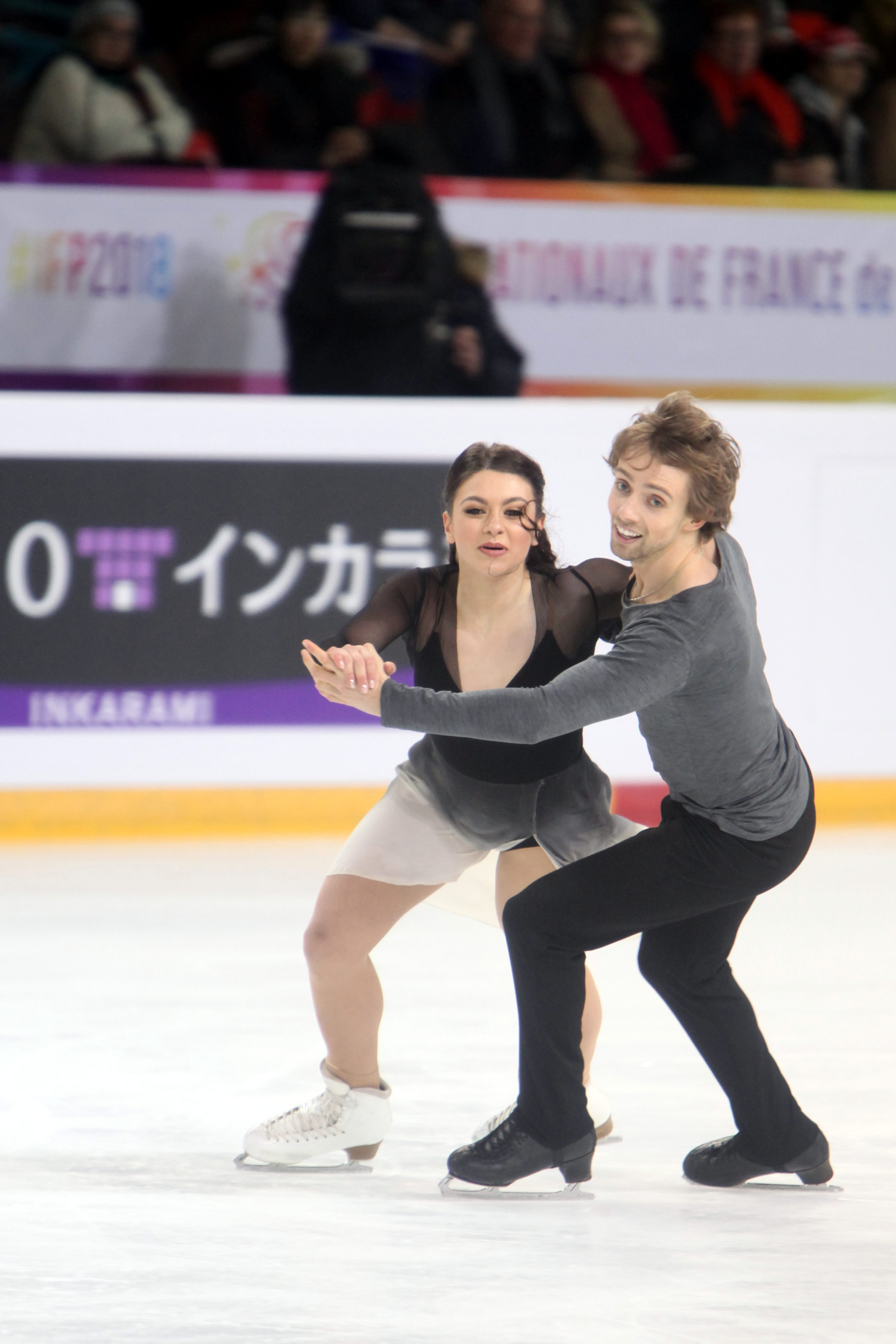
- Kaitlin Hawayek and Jean-Luc Baker at the 2018 Internationaux de France

Personal information
- Born: October 7, 1993 (age 33) Burnley, England, United Kingdom
- Home town: Montreal, Canada
- Height: 1.70 m (5 ft 7 in)

Figure skating career
- Country: Canada (since 2026); United States (until 2023)
- Discipline: Ice dance
- Partner: Marjorie Lajoie (since 2026); Kaitlin Hawayek (2012–23); Joylyn Yang (2006–11)
- Coach: Marie-France Dubreuil; Patrice Lauzon
- Skating club: Seattle Skating Club
- Began skating: 1995

Medal record
Representing United States
Four Continents Championships
Gold medal – first place	2018 Taipei	Ice dance
U.S. Championships
Bronze medal – third place	2019 Detroit	Ice dance
Bronze medal – third place	2020 Greensboro	Ice dance
Bronze medal – third place	2021 Las Vegas	Ice dance
Bronze medal – third place	2022 Nashville	Ice dance
World Team Trophy
Silver medal – second place	2021 Osaka	Team
World Junior Championships
Gold medal – first place	2014 Sofia	Ice dance
Junior Grand Prix Final
Silver medal – second place	2013–14 Fukuoka	Ice dance

Jean-Luc Baker (born October 7, 1993) is a British-American ice dancer that currently competes for Canada with Marjorie Lajoie.

With his former skating partner, Kaitlin Hawayek, he is the 2018 Four Continents champion, the 2018 NHK Trophy champion, and a four-time U.S. national bronze medalist (2019–22).

Earlier in their career, he and Hawayek became the 2014 World Junior champions, the 2013 Junior Grand Prix Final silver medalists, and the 2014 U.S. national junior champions.

== Personal life ==
Jean-Luc Baker was born in Burnley, England. He is the son of Sharon Jones Baker, who represented the United Kingdom in ice dancing at the 1988 Winter Olympics, and Stephen Baker, who competed for the U.K. in pair skating at the 1976 World Junior Championships. His first name was inspired by the fictional character Captain Jean-Luc Picard of Star Trek: The Next Generation.

Baker was born with a club foot. When he was four, he moved to the United States with his family. He attended Harbour Pointe Middle School and Kamiak High School in Mukilteo, Washington. After graduation, he moved to Detroit, Michigan to pursue his career. He has a black belt in taekwondo.

Since 2024, he has been in a relationship with British ice dancer, Olivia Smart. The pair announced their engagement via Instagram on Valentine's Day while at the 2026 Winter Olympics in Milan, Italy.

== Career as a competitive ice dancer ==
=== Early years ===
Jean-Luc Baker was introduced to ice skating by his parents in 1995. He was inspired to switch from singles to ice dancing by his mother. He teamed up with Joylyn Yang in the summer of 2006, with his parents coaching the duo. They won U.S. national titles on the juvenile and intermediate levels and took the novice bronze medal at the 2010 U.S. Championships. The following season, Yang/Baker were assigned to two ISU Junior Grand Prix events, finishing seventh in Japan and tenth in the Czech Republic. They were sixth on the junior level at the 2011 U.S. Championships.

=== Partnership with Kaitlin Hawayek for the United States ===
==== 2012–2013 season: Debut of Hawayek/Baker ====
Baker teamed up with Kaitlin Hawayek in June 2012. They were sent to two JGP events and won the silver medal in Germany. Hawayek/Baker took the junior silver medal at the 2013 U.S. Championships and were assigned to the 2013 World Junior Championships in Milan where they finished seventh.

==== 2013–2014 season: World Junior title ====
During the 2013–14 ISU Junior Grand Prix, Hawayek/Baker won the gold medal in their JGP events at the JGP Mexico and the JGP Poland. Their results qualified them to the JGP Final in Fukuoka, Japan, where they won the silver medal. They then won the gold medal at the 2014 World Junior Championships, setting a new Junior World record for the overall score with a total of 157.12 points.

==== 2014–2015 season: First Grand Prix medal ====
Hawayek/Baker began their season at an ISU Challenger Series event, the 2014 Nebelhorn Trophy. They finished fourth after placing fourth in the short and third in the free dance. Their Grand Prix assignments were the 2014 Rostelecom Cup and 2014 NHK Trophy, winning the bronze medal at the latter.

==== 2015–2016 season ====
Baker sustained a concussion when Hawayek accidentally struck him with her arm in September 2015, just before the Labor Day weekend. He returned to limited training after two weeks and full training a week later.

Hawayek/Baker finished fourth at the 2015 Skate America. Due to food poisoning, Hawayek vomited eight times in four hours during the night before the short dance at the 2015 Cup of China. After competing in the first segment, the duo decided to withdraw. They placed fifth at the 2016 U.S. Championships.

==== 2016–2017 season ====
Hawayek/Baker won the silver medal at the 2016 CS Autumn Classic International. Competing on the Grand Prix series, they finished sixth at the 2016 Skate Canada International and fourth at the 2016 NHK Trophy.

=== 2017–2018 season: Four Continents title ===
Beginning the season at the 2017 CS U.S. Classic, Hawayek/Baker won the silver medal. Their Grand Prix assignments were the 2018 Skate Canada International, where they placed fourth, and the 2018 Skate America, where they placed fifth. Following the Grand Prix, they competed in a second Challenger event, the 2017 CS Golden Spin of Zagreb, winning the bronze medal.

Hawayek/Baker won the pewter medal at the 2018 U.S. Championships and were assigned to the 2018 Four Continents Championships, as the top three teams were sent to the 2018 Winter Olympics. They won the gold medal at Four Continents, finishing 9.33 points ahead of silver medalists Carolane Soucisse / Shane Firus. Baker remarked, "it was really awesome; it was a new experience for us. We’ve medaled at junior events and sporadically at senior events in Grand Prixs or senior Bs. It was a really cool experience, and we hope to do it more often in the future."

Following the withdrawal of Maia and Alex Shibutani, they were named to the US team for the 2018 World Championships in Milan, where they placed tenth. On April 20, 2018, they announced that in the summer, they would begin training under Marie-France Dubreuil and Patrice Lauzon in Montreal, Quebec, Canada.

==== 2018–2019 season: Grand Prix gold, national bronze ====
Baker sustained a concussion during training in August 2018, and as a result, they withdrew from the 2018 CS Finlandia Trophy. At their first Grand Prix assignment, the 2018 NHK Trophy, the withdrawal of Gabriella Papadakis / Guillaume Cizeron due to injury left several teams competing for the gold medal. Hawayek/Baker came second in the rhythm dance, behind Tiffany Zahorski / Jonathan Guerreiro, but narrowly placed first in the free dance, winning the title overall. Hawayek called it "just such a pleasure and honor to be here performing" and was especially pleased with their results, given they "had just three weeks of training fully recovered" prior. They placed only fourth at the 2018 Internationaux de France, but their results qualified them for the Grand Prix Final in Vancouver, where they placed sixth.

At the 2019 U.S. Championships, Hawayker/Baker won the bronze medal. Reflecting on their move to Montreal, Hawayek called it "a great training center that we’re happy to be a part of. It makes us feel able to skate more openly and freely, and I think we’ll continue that for the next few years." They were assigned to the 2019 Four Continents Championships, where they finished fifth, and the 2019 World Championships, where they placed ninth.

==== 2019–2020 season ====
Beginning the season at the 2019 CS Nebelhorn Trophy, Hawayek/Baker placed fourth in the rhythm dance but took the silver medal overall after coming second in the free dance.

For their first Grand Prix assignment, they competed at 2019 Skate Canada International, where they were third after the rhythm dance. In the free dance, they dropped behind the British team Fear/Gibson. Competing at the 2019 Cup of China, Hawayek/Baker placed fifth in the rhythm dance after struggling on the Finnstep pattern dance. Several errors in the free dance kept them in fifth in that segment as well, and overall.

Hawayek/Baker placed third in the rhythm dance at the 2020 U.S. Championships and praised the crowd reception of their Saturday Night Fever program. Third in the free dance, they also won their second national bronze medal.

At the 2020 Four Continents Championships in Seoul, they placed seventh in the rhythm dance after a double fall out of their dance lift, which Hawayek described as "a fluke thing that happened." Fifth in the free dance, they rose to sixth place overall. They were assigned to compete at the World Championships in Montreal, but these were canceled as a result of the coronavirus pandemic.

==== 2020–2021 season ====
With the pandemic ongoing, Hawayek and Baker opted to return to live with Hawayek's parents in Buffalo, New York for the early months and were able to do some on-ice training when the rink in Buffalo was reopened as an essential workers' daycare, communicating with their coaches over Zoom. After quarantine, they returned to Montreal in June and rejoined their coaches at the Ice Academy of Montreal in July. With the Grand Prix assigned based mainly on training location, Hawayek/Baker nevertheless were assigned to the 2020 Skate America in Las Vegas and crossed the border again to attend. They won the silver medal.

Returning to the United States again for the 2021 U.S. Championships, also held in Las Vegas, Hawayek/Baker placed third in the rhythm dance. They were also third in the free dance, taking their third consecutive bronze medal. They were assigned to the American team for the 2021 World Championships in Stockholm. They placed eleventh in the rhythm dance and rose to ninth overall after the free dance.

Hawayek/Baker were chosen as America's dance entry in the 2021 World Team Trophy and finished third in both segments, while Team USA won the silver medal.

==== 2021–2022 season: Beijing Olympics ====
For the Olympic season, the duo opted for a free program to Frédéric Chopin's Prelude in E minor and Nocturne in E minor, music that Hawayek said she had long dreamed of skating to, saying that "there is a lot of maturity and depth in this music. There is nostalgia, hopefulness, and happiness. I envisioned something that was not too heavy but also not too youthful."

Hawayek sustained a concussion and received stitches to her head after a fall while practicing a lift in early July 2021. As a result, Hawayek/Baker withdrew from both the 2021 U.S. Classic and their first Grand Prix assignment, the 2021 NHK Trophy. They competed for the first time at the 2021 Rostelecom Cup, finishing in fifth place. They also competed on the Challenger series at the 2021 CS Golden Spin of Zagreb, winning the gold medal.

Hawayek/Baker entered the 2022 U.S. Championships seeking to make up ground on the previous year's pewter medalists, Green/Parsons, who had enjoyed a strong fall season while Hawayek/Baker were absent and recovering. Both teams made twizzle errors in the rhythm dance, with Hawayek/Baker in fourth place, 1.46 points behind Green/Parsons. Delivering a strong free dance, they were third in that segment and took their fourth consecutive bronze medal. She said afterward that "this means so much to us. It has not been a straight journey to this for us whatsoever over the last four years, especially over the last six months." The following day, they were named to their first American Olympic team.

Competing at the 2022 Winter Olympics in the dance event, Hawayek/Baker placed eleventh in the rhythm dance. For Hawayek, it was "an absolute joy to perform out there." They were tenth in the free dance, remaining in eleventh overall. For the Olympic gala, Baker choreographed Alysa Liu's program using the Itzy song "Loco," which was praised by both the musical group and its fans.

Hawayek and Baker concluded the season at the 2022 World Championships, held in Montpellier, France. Russian skaters were banned from the event by the International Skating Union due to their country's invasion of Ukraine. The team placed ninth in the rhythm dance, eighth in the free dance, and eighth overall.

==== 2022–2023 season ====
Hawayek and Baker enlisted Italian choreographer Massimo Scali to work on their rhythm dance for the new season, a program of Desi Arnaz's music inspired by Arnaz's dynamic with Lucille Ball. For the free dance, they chose music by Norwegian singer Askjell, citing his "very modern-day take on the essence of classical music."

The team made their season debut at the 2022 CS Finlandia Trophy, where they finished second behind Canadian training partners Fournier Beaudry/Sørensen. Hawayek/Baker then began the Grand Prix at the 2022 Skate America, winning the silver medal and notably finishing first in the free dance due to technical errors by American gold medalists Chock/Bates. They finished 0.73 points behind Chock/Bates overall. At their second assignment, the 2022 Grand Prix of Espoo, Hawayek and Baker finished second in the rhythm dance, clearing the 80-point threshold for the first time with a score of 80.93. They finished second in the free dance as well, taking their second Grand Prix silver medal and qualifying to the Grand Prix Final.

Appearing at the Final in Turin, they were sixth of the six teams in the rhythm dance but rose to fifth place after Fournier Beaudry/Sørensen dropped following a fall in the free dance. Baker said they were "thrilled" with their performance but disappointed with their marks, vowing to "continue to build for our next events."

On January 17, Hawayek/Baker announced that they were withdrawing from the 2023 U.S. Championships, saying that they had been dealing with "significant physical injuries that have led to challenges in our mental health and we feel it is in our best interest to prioritize this currently." They said that they would petition to be included on the World Championship team on the strength of their results that season and in years prior. Following the U.S. Championships, U.S. Figure Skating approved their petition, and they were announced as part of the World team on January 29. However, on February 24 it was announced that they had withdrawn to further prioritize "their healing and mental health." They were replaced by Christina Carreira and Anthony Ponomarenko.

==== 2023–2024 season ====
Hawayek and Baker were assigned to the 2023 Grand Prix de France and 2023 NHK Trophy. However, they withdrew from those events on October 23 and October 25 due to Baker suffering a concussion.

On January 15, Hawayek announced that they had "made the tough decision to take a step back from competing for the remainder of the season and reevaluate our options for future seasons."

=== Partnership with Marjorie Lajoie for Canada ===
==== 2026–27 season: Return to competition ====
In June 2026, it was announced that Baker had teamed up with Canadian ice dancer, Marjorie Lajoie, with plans to return to competitive ice dance. It was also stated that the team would represent Canada and train at the Ice Academy of Montreal.

== Career as a choreographer ==
Following the announcement of Hawayek and Baker's break from competitive ice dancing, Baker began working as a figure skating choreographer. His clients have included:

- (United States) Emily Bratti / Ian Somerville
- (France) Loïcia Demougeot / Théo le Mercier
- (Italy) Rebecca Ghilardi / Filippo Ambrosini
- (United States) Caroline Green / Michael Parsons
- (Australia) Holly Harris / Jason Chan
- (Japan) Marin Honda / Shoma Uno
- (United States) Alysa Liu
- (Canada) Lia Pereira / Trennt Michaud
- (Estonia) Aleksandr Selevko
- (China) Zhao Qihan

== Programs ==
=== Ice dance with Kaitlin Hawayek ===
Season	Short dance	Free dance	Exhibition
2023–2024	With or Without You by U2 choreo. by Marie-France Dubreuil, Kaitlin Hawayek, & Jean-Luc Baker	Kyle (Northern Line) by Fred Again; AUS23 (1:1) by Charles Leclerc; Kyle (Northern Line) by Fred Again choreo. by Marie-France Dubreuil, Kaitlin Hawayek, & Jean-Luc Baker	
2022–2023	Samba: Cuban Pete by Joseph Norman performed by the Desi Arnaz Orchestra; Rhumba: Perhaps, Perhaps, Perhaps (Quizás, Quizás, Quizás) by Osvaldo Farrés & Joe Davis performed by the Desi Arnaz Orchestra; Samba: El Cumbanchero by Rafael Hernández Marín performed by the Desi Arnaz Orchestra, Xavier Cugat choreo. by Marie-France Dubreuil, Massimo Scali, Kaitlin Hawayek. & Jean-Luc Baker	Requiem by Askjell; Sofia by Askjell, Aurora & Iris choreo. by Marie-France Dubreuil, Massimo Scali, Kaitlin Hawayek, & Jean-Luc Baker	Black and Gold by Sam Sparro
2021–2022	Blues: Love to Love You Baby (Giorgio Moroder Remix); Disco: Bad Girls (Gigamesh Remix) by Donna Summer choreo. by Romain Haguenauer, Marie-France Dubreuil, Samuel Chouinard, Gigi Cournoyer, Kaitlin Hawayek, & Jean-Luc Baker	Prelude in E minor, Op. 28, No 4; Nocturne in E minor, Op. 72, No. 1 by Frédéric Chopin choreo. by Romain Haguenauer, Marie-France Dubreuil, Samuel Chouinard, Gigi Cournoyer, Kaitlin Hawayek, & Jean-Luc Baker	
2020–2021	Swing: Stayin' Alive; Swing: Night Fever by Bee Gees; Swing: Boogie Shoes by KC and the Sunshine Band; Swing: You Should Be Dancing by various artists choreo. by Marie-France Dubreuil, Samuel Chouinard, & Romain Haguenauer	Heart of Glass by Philip Glass and Blondie; First Movement by Philip Glass choreo. by Romain Haguenauer, Marie-France Dubreuil, Samuel Chouinard, Gigi Cournoyer, Kaitlin Hawayek, & Jean-Luc Baker	Swan Lake Comedy
2019–2020	Disco: Stayin' Alive; Foxtrot: How Deep Is Your Love by Bee Gees; Disco: You Should Be Dancing by various artists choreo. by Marie-France Dubreuil, Samuel Chouinard, & Romain Haguenauer	Symphony No. 5 by Ludwig van Beethoven performed by Marcin Patrzalek; Caprice No. 24 by Marcin Patrzalek choreo. by Marie-France Dubreuil, Samuel Chouinard, & Romain Haguenauer	Swan Lake Comedy
2018–2019	Tango: Vuelo al Sur by Juan Carlos Cáceres; Tango: A los Amigo by Forever Tango choreo. by Marie-France Dubreuil & Romain Haguenauer	Trampoline Theme; In This Shirt by The Irrepressibles choreo. by Marie-France Dubreuil & Romain Haguenauer	Austin Powers medley: Shining Star by Maurice White, Larry Dunn, Philip Bailey; Let's Get It On by Marvin Gaye, Ed Townsend; Soul Bossa Nova by Quincy Jones
2017–2018	Samba: Get Busy by Sean Paul; Rhumba: Soha Mil Paso by Isabelle & Felicien; Samba: Fireball by Pitbull choreo. by Pasquale Camerlengo	Liebesträume by Franz Liszt choreo. by Pasquale Camerlengo	Austin Powers medley: Shining Star by Maurice White, Larry Dunn, Philip Bailey; Let's Get It On by Marvin Gaye, Ed Townsend; Soul Bossa Nova by Quincy Jones
2016–2017	Blues: Feeling Good by Michael Bublé; Hip Hop: How I Feel remix by Flo Rida choreo. by Pasquale Camerlengo	Liebesträume by Franz Liszt choreo. by Pasquale Camerlengo	Earned It by The Weeknd
2015–2016	The Nutcracker by Pyotr Ilyich Tchaikovsky; Waltz: Waltz of the Flowers; Polka: (The Nutcracker) March; Waltz: Waltz of the Flowers choreo. by Anjelika Krylova, Kaitlin Hawayek, & Jean-Luc Baker	The Theory of Everything by Jóhann Jóhannsson choreo. by Pasquale Camerlengo	Take Me to Church by Hozier
2014–2015	Flamenco: Malagueña by Ernesto Lecuona; Paso Doble; Flamenco	Romeo & Juliet by Abel Korzeniowski; Wedding Vows; The Cheek of Night; Come, Gentle Night; Forbidden Love	Wicked Game by Chris Isaak
2013–2014	Happy Feet; It Had To Be You by Harry Connick; Sing, Sing, Sing	Amélie by Yann Tiersen; J'y suis jamais allé; Comptine d'un autre été : L'après-midi; La noyée; Sur le fil	Dreaming with a Broken Heart by John Mayer
2012–2013	Minnie the Moocher performed by Big Bad Voodoo Daddy; Gimme Some Rhythm Daddy performed by The Brian Setzer Orchestra	Singin' in the Rain by Nacio Herb Brown & Arthur Freed	

=== With Yang ===
Season	Short dance	Free dance
2010–2011	Chudat Medoni by Oleg Fesov	The Windmills of Your Mind (from Thomas Crown Affair) by Vic Damone; The Windmills of Your Mind by Parenthetical Girls
2009–2010		Titanic by James Horner
2008–2009		Kingdom of Heaven by Harry Gregson-Williams
2007–2008		Harem by Sarah Brightman

== Competitive highlights ==
=== Ice dance with Marjorie Lajoie for Canada ===
- GP – Event of the ISU Grand Prix Series
- JGP – Event of the ISU Junior Grand Prix Series
- CS – Event of the ISU Challenger Series
- TBD – Assigned
- WD – Withdrew from competition
- C – Event was cancelled

Competition placements at senior level
Season	2026–27
GP Finland	TBD
GP NHK Trophy	TBD

=== Ice dance with Kaitlin Hawayek for the United States ===
Competition placements at senior level
Season	2014–15	2015–16	2016–17	2017–18	2018–19	2019–20	2020–21	2021–22	2022–23
Winter Olympics								11th	
World Championships				10th	9th	C	9th	8th	
Four Continents Championships	5th			1st	5th	6th			
Grand Prix Final					6th				5th
U.S. Championships	4th	5th	5th	4th	3rd	3rd	3rd	3rd	
World Team Trophy							2nd (3rd)		
GP Cup of China		WD				5th			
GP Finland									2nd
GP France					4th				
GP NHK Trophy	3rd		4th		1st				
GP Rostelecom Cup	6th							5th	
GP Skate America		4th		5th			2nd		2nd
GP Skate Canada			6th	4th		4th			
CS Autumn Classic			2nd						
CS Finlandia Trophy		4th							2nd
CS Golden Spin of Zagreb		2nd	2nd	3rd				1st	
CS Nebelhorn Trophy	4th					2nd			
CS U.S. Classic				2nd					

Competition placements at junior level
Season	2012–13	2013–14
World Junior Championships	7th	1st
Junior Grand Prix Final		2nd
U.S. Championships	2nd	1st
JGP Germany	2nd	
JGP Mexico		1st
JGP Poland		1st
JGP Turkey	5th	

=== Ice dance with Joylyn Yang for the United States ===
Competition placements at junior level
Season	2010–11
U.S. Championships	6th
JGP Czech Republic	10th
JGP Japan	7th

== Detailed results ==
=== Ice dance with Kaitlin Hawayek ===
ISU personal best scores in the +5/-5 GOE System
Segment	Type	Score	Event
Total	TSS	202.46	2022 Grand Prix of Espoo
Rhythm dance	TSS	80.93	2022 Grand Prix of Espoo
Rhythm dance	TES	45.68	2022 Grand Prix of Espoo
Rhythm dance	PCS	35.25	2022 Grand Prix of Espoo
Free dance	TSS	122.95	2022 Skate America
Free dance	TES	69.39	2022 Skate America
Free dance	PCS	54.02	2022 Grand Prix of Espoo

ISU personal bests in the +3/-3 GOE System (from 2010–11)
Segment	Type	Score	Event
Total	TSS	177.36	2016 CS Golden Spin of Zagreb
Short dance	TSS	70.12	2016 CS Golden Spin of Zagreb
Short dance	TES	37.16	2016 CS Golden Spin of Zagreb
Short dance	PCS	32.96	2016 CS Golden Spin of Zagreb
Free dance	TSS	107.24	2016 CS Golden Spin of Zagreb
Free dance	TES	54.74	2016 CS Golden Spin of Zagreb
Free dance	PCS	52.50	2016 CS Golden Spin of Zagreb

- Small medals for the short program and free skating are only awarded at ISU Championships.
- Medals at team events are awarded for the team result only. The individual placements at team events are listed in parentheses.

==== Senior level ====
Results in the 2014–15 season
Date	Event	SD		FD		Total	
Date	Event	P	Score	P	Score	P	Score
Sep 24–27, 2014	(Germany) 2014 CS Nebelhorn Trophy	4	53.11	3	89.20	4	142.31
Nov 14–16, 2014	(Russia) 2014 Rostelecom Cup	7	52.86	6	83.47	6	136.33
Nov 28–30, 2014	(Japan) 2014 NHK Trophy	4	58.50	3	87.91	3	146.41
Jan 18–25, 2015	(United States) 2015 U.S. Championships	4	63.95	4	98.50	4	162.45
Feb 9–15, 2015	(South Korea) 2015 Four Continents Championships	6	58.31	5	91.67	5	149.98

Results in the 2015–16 season
Date	Event	SD		FD		Total	
Date	Event	P	Score	P	Score	P	Score
Oct 9–11, 2015	(Finland) 2015 CS Finlandia Trophy	4	55.60	7	77.26	4	132.86
Oct 23–25, 2015	(United States) 2015 Skate America	4	56.54	4	94.15	4	150.69
Nov 6–8, 2015	2015 Cup of China	4	58.35	–	–	–	WD
Dec 2–5, 2015	(Croatia) 2015 CS Golden Spin of Zagreb	2	58.76	2	94.30	2	153.06
Jan 15–24, 2016	(United States) 2016 U.S. Championships	5	63.02	5	95.84	5	158.86

Results in the 2016–17 season
Date	Event	SD		FD		Total	
Date	Event	P	Score	P	Score	P	Score
Sep 29 – Oct 1, 2016	(Canada) 2016 CS Autumn Classic International	3	62.70	2	97.80	2	160.50
Oct 28–30, 2016	2016 Skate Canada International	6	65.01	6	97.18	6	162.19
Nov 28–30, 2016	(Japan) 2016 NHK Trophy	5	65.41	4	104.34	4	169.75
Dec 7–10, 2016	(Croatia) 2016 CS Golden Spin of Zagreb	2	70.12	2	107.24	2	177.36
Jan 14–22, 2017	(United States) 2017 U.S. Championships	4	72.60	8	87.46	5	160.06

Results in the 2017–18 season
Date	Event	SD		FD		Total	
Date	Event	P	Score	P	Score	P	Score
Sep 13–17, 2017	(United States) 2017 CS U.S. International Classic	3	56.65	2	96.90	2	153.55
Oct 27–29, 2017	2017 Skate Canada International	5	63.10	4	102.10	4	165.20
Nov 24–26, 2017	(United States) 2017 Skate America	7	62.15	5	101.38	5	163.53
Dec 6–9, 2017	(Croatia) 2017 CS Golden Spin of Zagreb	4	63.58	3	100.30	3	163.88
Jan 5–7, 2018	(United States) 2018 U.S. Championships	4	73.18	4	114.43	4	187.61
Jan 22–27, 2018	(Taiwan) 2018 Four Continents Championships	1	69.08	1	105.21	1	174.29
Mar 21–24, 2018	(Italy) 2018 World Championships	15	63.48	10	101.80	10	165.28

Results in the 2018–19 season
Date	Event	RD		FD		Total	
Date	Event	P	Score	P	Score	P	Score
Nov 9–11, 2018	(Japan) 2018 NHK Trophy	2	70.71	1	113.92	1	184.63
Nov 23–25, 2018	2018 Internationaux de France	4	69.85	4	111.62	4	181.47
Dec 6–9, 2018	(Canada) 2018–19 Grand Prix Final	6	71.33	5	112.71	6	184.04
Jan 19–27, 2019	(United States) 2019 U.S. Championships	3	76.77	3	120.18	3	196.95
Feb 7–10, 2019	(United States) 2019 Four Continents Championships	5	74.42	5	115.45	5	189.87
Mar 18–24, 2019	(Japan) 2019 World Championships	9	75.90	10	113.16	9	189.06

Results in the 2019–20 season
Date	Event	RD		FD		Total	
Date	Event	P	Score	P	Score	P	Score
Sep 25–28, 2019	(Germany) 2019 CS Nebelhorn Trophy	4	75.77	2	116.70	2	192.47
Oct 25–27, 2019	2019 Skate Canada International	3	79.52	4	115.25	4	194.77
Nov 8–10, 2019	2019 Cup of China	5	74.70	5	105.26	5	179.96
Jan 21–26, 2020	(United States) 2020 U.S. Championships	3	82.59	3	118.57	3	201.16
Feb 4–9, 2020	(South Korea) 2020 Four Continents Championships	7	71.93	5	116.56	6	188.49

Results in the 2020–21 season
Date	Event	RD		FD		Total	
Date	Event	P	Score	P	Score	P	Score
Oct 23–24, 2020	(United States) 2020 Skate America	2	81.15	2	121.32	2	202.47
Jan 11–21, 2021	(United States) 2021 U.S. Championships	3	85.28	3	127.27	3	212.55
Mar 22–28, 2021	(Sweden) 2021 World Championships	11	75.08	9	113.43	9	188.51
Apr 15–18, 2021	(Japan) 2021 World Team Trophy	3	76.79	3	110.16	2 (3)	186.95

Results in the 2021–22 season
Date	Event	RD		FD		Total	
Date	Event	P	Score	P	Score	P	Score
Nov 25–28, 2021	(Russia) 2021 Rostelecom Cup	5	73.72	5	113.90	5	187.62
Dec 9–11, 2021	(Croatia) 2021 CS Golden Spin of Zagreb	2	74.60	1	116.72	1	191.32
Jan 3–9, 2022	(United States) 2022 U.S. Championships	4	79.39	3	126.29	3	205.68
Feb 12–14, 2022	(China) 2022 Winter Olympics	11	74.58	10	115.16	11	189.74
Mar 21–27, 2022	(France) 2022 World Championships	9	76.56	8	115.05	8	191.61

Results in the 2022–23 season
Date	Event	RD		FD		Total	
Date	Event	P	Score	P	Score	P	Score
Oct 4–9, 2022	(Finland) 2022 CS Finlandia Trophy	2	78.90	2	118.55	2	197.45
Oct 21–23, 2022	(United States) 2022 Skate America	2	79.12	1	122.95	2	202.07
Nov 25–27, 2022	(Finland) 2022 Grand Prix of Espoo	2	80.93	2	121.53	2	202.46
Dec 8–11, 2022	(Italy) 2022–23 Grand Prix Final	6	79.50	5	118.56	5	198.06

==== Junior level ====
Results in the 2012–13 season
Date	Event	SD		FD		Total	
Date	Event	P	Score	P	Score	P	Score
Sep 19–22, 2012	2012 JGP Turkey	3	54.56	6	73.43	5	127.99
Oct 10–13, 2012	2012 JGP Germany	2	58.66	2	79.95	2	138.61
Jan 20–27, 2013	(United States) 2015 U.S. Junior Championships	3	60.72	2	89.02	2	149.74
Feb 25 – Mar 3, 2013	(Italy) 2013 World Junior Championships	11	49.63	6	74.72	7	124.35

Results in the 2013–14 season
Date	Event	SD		FD		Total	
Date	Event	P	Score	P	Score	P	Score
Sep 4–7, 2013	2013 JGP Mexico	1	56.11	2	80.34	1	136.45
Sep 18–21, 2013	2013 JGP Poland	1	62.58	1	82.26	1	144.84
Dec 5–8, 2013	(Japan) 2013–14 JGP Final	2	58.05	2	81.37	2	139.42
Jan 5–12, 2014	(United States) 2014 U.S. Junior Championships	1	65.30	1	86.96	1	152.26
Mar 10–16, 2014	(Bulgaria) 2014 World Junior Championships	1	66.73	2	90.39	1	157.12
