= 2021 CS Golden Spin of Zagreb =

Figure skating competition

- Type: ISU Challenger Series
- Date: December 7 – 11
- Season: 2021–22
- Location: Sisak, Croatia
- Host: Croatian Skating Federation
- Venue: Ledena dvorana Zibel

Champions
- Men's singles: (Canada) Keegan Messing
- Women's singles: (Georgia (country)) Anastasiia Gubanova
- Pairs: (United States) Audrey Lu / Misha Mitrofanov
- Ice dance: (United States) Kaitlin Hawayek / Jean-Luc Baker
- Previous: 2019 CS Golden Spin of Zagreb
- Next: 2022 CS Golden Spin of Zagreb
- Previous CS: 2021 CS Warsaw Cup

The 2021 CS Golden Spin of Zagreb was held on December 7–11, 2021 in Sisak, Croatia. It was part of the 2021–22 ISU Challenger Series. Medals were awarded in the disciplines of men's singles, women's singles, pair skating, and ice dance.

The non-Challenger portion of the event for juniors was cancelled.

== Entries ==
The International Skating Union published the list of entries on November 15, 2021.

Country	Men	Women	Pairs	Ice dance
Armenia				Tina Garabedian / Simon Proulx-Sénécal
Australia	Brendan Kerry	Victoria Alcantara; Kailani Craine	Maria Chernyshova / Harley Windsor; Anastasia Golubeva / Hektor Giotopoulos Moore; Campbell Young / Lachlan Lewer	Holly Harris / Jason Chan; India Nette / Eron Westwood
Bulgaria		Ivelina Baycheva; Kristina Grigorova; Maria Levushkina		
Canada	Keegan Messing; Conrad Orzel; Joseph Phan		Vanessa James / Eric Radford; Kirsten Moore-Towers / Michael Marinaro; Evelyn Walsh / Trennt Michaud	
Croatia	Charles Henry Katanović; Jari Kessler		Lana Petranović / Antonio Souza-Kordeiru	
Cyprus		Marilena Kitromilis		
Czech Republic	Georgii Reshtenko	Eliška Březinová; Ellen Slavíčková		
Estonia	Aleksandr Selevko; Mihhail Selevko	Gerli Liinamäe; Niina Petrõkina; Kristina Škuleta-Gromova		Solène Mazingue / Marko Jevgeni Gaidajenko
Finland	Makar Suntsev		Milania Väänänen / Mikhail Akulov	
France	Kévin Aymoz	Maïa Mazzara		
Georgia	Nika Egadze; Morisi Kvitelashvili	Anastasiia Gubanova	Anastasiia Metelkina / Daniil Parkman; Karina Safina / Luka Berulava	
Great Britain		Elena Komova		
Hungary			Maria Pavlova / Balázs Nagy	
Israel	Alexei Bychenko; Mark Gorodnitsky; Daniel Samohin	Taylor Morris	Hailey Kops / Evgeni Krasnopolski	Mariia Nosovitskaya / Mikhail Nosovitskiy
Italy	Alessandro Fadini; Raffaele Francesco Zich		Irma Caldara / Riccardo Maglio	
Kazakhstan	Dias Jirenbayev			Gaukhar Nauryzova / Boyisangur Datiev
Latvia	Deniss Vasiļjevs			Aurelija Ipolito / Luke Russell
Lithuania				Allison Reed / Saulius Ambrulevičius
Mexico		Andrea Montesinos Cantú		
Netherlands		Niki Wories		Hanna Jakucs / Alessio Galli; Chelsea Verhaegh / Sherim van Geffen
Poland	Vladimir Samoilov			
Russia	Andrei Mozalev		Iuliia Artemeva / Mikhail Nazarychev	Elizaveta Shanaeva / Devid Naryzhnyy
Serbia		Antonina Dubinina		
Slovenia		Daša Grm		
Sweden		Josefin Taljegård		
Turkey	Burak Demirboğa; Başar Oktar; Alp Eren Özkan			
United States	Jimmy Ma; Eric Sjoberg	Amber Glenn; Hanna Harrell; Gabriella Izzo	Jessica Calalang / Brian Johnson; Alexa Knierim / Brandon Frazier; Audrey Lu / Misha Mitrofanov	Emily Bratti / Ian Somerville; Molly Cesanek / Yehor Yehorov; Kaitlin Hawayek / Jean-Luc Baker

=== Changes to preliminary assignments ===
Date	Discipline	Withdrew	Added	Reason/Other notes	Refs
November 16	Men	(Italy) Nikolaj Memola			
November 16	Women	(Philippines) Alisson Krystle Perticheto	(Bulgaria) Maria Levushkina		
November 16	Ice dance	(Italy) Charlène Guignard / Marco Fabbri			
November 22	Women	(United States) Bradie Tennell	(United States) Gabriella Izzo		
November 23	Men	(Mexico) Donovan Carrillo	(Finland) Makar Suntsev		
November 23	Women	(Israel) Alina Iushchenkova			
November 23	Women	(Turkey) Sinem Pekder			
November 23	Women	(Turkey) Yasemin Zeki			
November 23	Pairs	(Italy) Rebecca Ghilardi / Filippo Ambrosini			
November 23	Ice dance	(Belarus) Ekaterina Andreeva / Ivan Desyatov			
November 23	Ice dance	(Belarus) Viktoria Semenjuk / Ilya Yukhimuk			
November 24	Men	(Georgia (country)) Irakli Maysuradze	(Georgia (country)) Morisi Kvitelashvili		
November 29	Women	(United States) Mariah Bell	(United States) Amber Glenn		
November 30	Men	(France) Adam Siao Him Fa	(Poland) Vladimir Samoilov		
November 30	Men	(France) Romain Ponsart			
November 30	Men	(Russia) Artur Danielian			
November 30	Women	(Finland) Linnea Ceder			
November 30	Women	(France) Julie Froetscher			
November 30	Women	(South Korea) You Young			
November 30	Women	(Latvia) Anete Lāce			
November 30	Women	(Russia) Kseniia Sinitsyna			
November 30	Pairs	(Belarus) Ekaterina Yurova / Dmitry Bushlanov			
November 30	Pairs	(France) Camille Kovalev / Pavel Kovalev			
November 30	Pairs	(France) Coline Keriven / Noël-Antoine Pierre			
November 30	Pairs	(France) Océane Piegad / Rémi Belmonte			
November 30	Pairs	(Netherlands) Nika Osipova / Dmitry Epstein			
November 30	Pairs	(Russia) Karina Akopova / Nikita Rakhmanin	(Russia) Polina Kostiukovich / Aleksei Briukhanov		
November 30	Ice dance	(United Kingdom) Lilah Fear / Lewis Gibson			
November 30	Ice dance	(Russia) Diana Davis / Gleb Smolkin			
December 1	Men	N/A	(Georgia (country)) Nika Egadze		
December 3	Men	(South Korea) Cha Jun-hwan			
December 3	Men	(United States) Jason Brown			
December 3	Pairs	(Russia) Polina Kostiukovich / Aleksei Briukhanov			
December 3	Pairs	(Russia) Alina Pepeleva / Roman Pleshkov			
December 6	Men	(Kazakhstan) Rakhat Bralin			
December 6	Women	(Croatia) Hana Cvijanović			
December 6	Women	(Israel) Mariia Seniuk			
December 6	Women	(Italy) Roberta Rodeghiero			
December 6	Women	(Netherlands) Lindsay van Zundert			
December 6	Pairs	(Netherlands) Daria Danilova / Michel Tsiba			
December 6	Ice dance	(Israel) Elizabeth Bernardini / Ronald Zilberberg			
December 7	Men	(Russia) Petr Gumennik			
December 7	Men	(Switzerland) Nicola Todeschini			
December 7	Women	(Italy) Lara Naki Gutmann			
December 8	Men	(United Kingdom) Edward Appleby			
December 8	Men	(Kazakhstan) Mikhail Shaidorov			
December 8	Men	(Sweden) Nikolaj Majorov			
December 8	Women	(Sweden) Anita Östlund			
December 8	Pairs	(Czech Republic) Elizaveta Zhuk / Martin Bidař			
December 8	Ice dance	(Georgia (country)) Maria Kazakova / Georgy Reviya			
December 8	Ice dance	(Italy) Carolina Moscheni / Francesco Fioretti			
December 8	Ice dance	(Russia) Annabelle Morozov / Andrei Bagin			

== Results ==
=== Men ===
Rank	Name	Nation	Total points	SP		FS	
1	Keegan Messing	Canada	255.07	1	90.26	5	164.81
2	Andrei Mozalev	Russia	252.15	6	80.71	1	171.44
3	Jimmy Ma	United States	250.97	5	80.84	2	170.13
4	Deniss Vasiļjevs	Latvia	250.07	2	84.46	4	165.61
5	Aleksandr Selevko	Estonia	238.42	7	80.54	7	157.88
6	Brendan Kerry	Australia	231.36	3	84.36	9	147.00
7	Kévin Aymoz	France	229.42	14	70.35	6	159.07
8	Morisi Kvitelashvili	Georgia	226.61	22	58.53	3	168.08
9	Georgii Reshtenko	Czech Republic	224.48	11	72.58	8	151.90
10	Conrad Orzel	Canada	219.20	8	78.85	11	140.35
11	Nika Egadze	Georgia	214.64	9	73.56	10	141.08
12	Eric Sjoberg	United States	212.77	10	73.48	12	139.29
13	Alexei Bychenko	Israel	211.55	4	82.88	16	128.67
14	Mihhail Selevko	Estonia	209.08	12	70.84	14	138.24
15	Mark Gorodnitsky	Israel	204.62	16	66.66	15	137.96
16	Joseph Phan	Canada	194.65	24	56.01	13	138.64
17	Burak Demirboğa	Turkey	193.58	18	64.96	17	128.62
18	Vladimir Samoilov	Poland	190.35	15	68.19	21	122.16
19	Jari Kessler	Croatia	190.23	17	65.01	19	125.22
20	Makar Suntsev	Finland	185.84	21	60.97	20	124.87
21	Raffaele Francesco Zich	Italy	185.18	19	64.21	22	120.97
22	Başar Oktar	Turkey	183.97	13	70.35	24	113.58
23	Daniel Samohin	Israel	182.97	23	56.85	18	126.12
24	Alessandro Fadini	Italy	177.74	20	63.67	23	114.07
25	Alp Eren Özkan	Turkey	163.81	25	55.38	25	108.43
26	Charles Henry Katanović	Croatia	149.41	26	53.60	26	95.81
WD	Dias Jirenbayev	Kazakhstan	withdrew from competition				

=== Women ===
Rank	Name	Nation	Total points	SP		FS	
1	Anastasiia Gubanova	Georgia	184.29	1	65.68	3	118.61
2	Amber Glenn	United States	183.36	2	64.45	2	118.91
3	Niina Petrõkina	Estonia	182.57	4	61.35	1	121.22
4	Gabriella Izzo	United States	167.96	3	62.91	8	105.05
5	Marilena Kitromilis	Cyprus	166.95	5	58.71	5	108.24
6	Maïa Mazzara	France	162.79	13	50.39	4	112.40
7	Hanna Harrell	United States	158.89	6	57.30	9	101.59
8	Kailani Craine	Australia	158.65	10	53.22	7	105.43
9	Kristina Škuleta-Gromova	Estonia	157.08	12	51.56	6	105.85
10	Gerli Liinamäe	Estonia	152.01	8	54.03	10	97.98
11	Eliška Březinová	Czech Republic	150.83	7	55.27	11	95.56
12	Josefin Taljegård	Sweden	143.02	11	53.04	14	89.98
13	Taylor Morris	Israel	139.24	15	45.14	12	94.10
14	Ellen Slavíčková	Czech Republic	138.04	14	46.90	13	91.14
15	Andrea Montesinos Cantú	Mexico	131.85	19	42.78	15	89.07
16	Daša Grm	Slovenia	131.26	9	53.56	22	77.70
17	Maria Levushkina	Bulgaria	129.95	17	44.23	17	85.72
18	Ivelina Baycheva	Bulgaria	128.71	21	42.52	16	86.19
19	Elena Komova	Great Britain	126.66	20	42.58	18	84.08
20	Niki Wories	Netherlands	125.24	18	42.85	19	82.39
21	Antonina Dubinina	Serbia	123.17	23	42.19	20	80.98
22	Victoria Alcantara	Australia	122.63	16	44.38	21	78.25
23	Kristina Grigorova	Bulgaria	115.71	22	42.26	23	73.45

=== Pairs ===
Rank	Name	Nation	Total points	SP		FS	
1	Audrey Lu / Misha Mitrofanov	United States	195.32	3	66.41	2	128.91
2	Anastasiia Metelkina / Daniil Parkman	Georgia	189.60	4	65.97	4	123.63
3	Iuliia Artemeva / Mikhail Nazarychev	Russia	189.29	7	61.18	3	128.11
4	Vanessa James / Eric Radford	Canada	187.57	9	56.74	1	130.83
5	Alexa Knierim / Brandon Frazier	United States	186.69	2	66.44	5	120.25
6	Jessica Calalang / Brian Johnson	United States	180.49	5	61.74	6	118.75
7	Karina Safina / Luka Berulava	Georgia	179.33	1	66.95	8	112.38
8	Kirsten Moore-Towers / Michael Marinaro	Canada	176.97	6	61.51	7	115.46
9	Evelyn Walsh / Trennt Michaud	Canada	168.87	8	59.31	10	109.56
10	Anastasia Golubeva / Hektor Giotopoulos Moore	Australia	163.57	13	53.41	9	110.16
11	Lana Petranović / Antonio Souza-Kordeiru	Croatia	163.29	10	56.40	11	106.89
12	Hailey Kops / Evgeni Krasnopolski	Israel	159.51	12	53.79	12	105.72
13	Maria Pavlova / Balázs Nagy	Hungary	151.53	11	55.61	14	95.92
14	Irma Caldara / Riccardo Maglio	Italy	147.29	14	51.18	13	96.11
15	Maria Chernyshova / Harley Windsor	Australia	139.61	15	49.02	15	90.59
16	Milania Väänänen / Mikhail Akulov	Finland	135.34	16	48.99	16	86.35
17	Campbell Young / Lachlan Lewer	Australia	103.78	17	35.17	17	68.61

=== Ice dance ===
Rank	Name	Nation	Total points	RD		FD	
1	Kaitlin Hawayek / Jean-Luc Baker	United States	191.32	2	74.60	1	116.72
2	Allison Reed / Saulius Ambrulevičius	Lithuania	180.15	1	75.81	4	104.34
3	Elizaveta Shanaeva / Devid Naryzhnyy	Russia	177.83	3	70.59	2	107.24
4	Tina Garabedian / Simon Proulx-Sénécal	Armenia	175.18	4	70.57	3	104.61
5	Emily Bratti / Ian Somerville	United States	172.24	5	68.90	5	103.34
6	Molly Cesanek / Yehor Yehorov	United States	166.61	7	65.23	6	101.38
7	Holly Harris / Jason Chan	Australia	163.48	6	65.54	7	97.94
8	Mariia Nosovitskaya / Mikhail Nosovitskiy	Israel	150.23	9	57.45	8	92.78
9	Solène Mazingue / Marko Jevgeni Gaidajenko	Estonia	147.51	8	58.89	9	88.62
10	Aurelija Ipolito / Luke Russell	Latvia	133.66	10	50.85	10	82.81
11	India Nette / Eron Westwood	Australia	123.53	13	46.88	11	76.65
12	Hanna Jakucs / Alessio Galli	Netherlands	119.71	12	47.17	12	72.54
13	Gaukhar Nauryzova / Boyisangur Datiev	Kazakhstan	112.64	14	46.45	13	66.19
14	Chelsea Verhaegh / Sherim van Geffen	Netherlands	107.23	11	48.98	14	58.25
