= 2026 CS Lombardia Trophy =

Figure skating competition in Bergamo, Italy

- Type: ISU Challenger Series
- Date: 17 – 20 September
- Season: 2026–27
- Location: Bergamo, Italy
- Host: Italian Ice Sports Federation
- Venue: IceLab Arena

Champions
- Men's singles: (Estonia) Mihhail Selevko
- Women's singles: (Estonia) Niina Petrõkina
- Ice dance: (Czech Republic) Kateřina Mrázková and Daniel Mrázek
- Previous: 2025 CS Lombardia Trophy
- Previous CS: 2026 CS John Nicks International Pairs Competition
- Next CS: 2026 CS Nebelhorn Trophy

The 2026 Lombardia Trophy is a figure skating competition sanctioned by the International Skating Union (ISU), organized and hosted by the Italian Ice Sports Federation (Italian: Federazione Italiana Sport del Ghiaccio), and the fourth event of the 2026–27 ISU Challenger Series. It was held at the IceLab Arena in Bergamo, Italy, from 18 to 20 September 2026. Medals were awarded in men's singles, women's singles, and ice dance, and skaters earned ISU World Standing points based on their results. Mihhail Selevko and Niina Petrõkina, both of Estonia, won the men's and women's events, respectively, while Kateřina Mrázková and Daniel Mrázek of the Czech Republic won the ice dance event.

== Background ==
The ISU Challenger Series was introduced in 2014. It is a series of international figure skating competitions sanctioned by the International Skating Union (ISU) and organized by ISU member nations. The objective was to ensure consistent organization and structure within a series of international competitions linked together, providing opportunities for senior-level skaters to compete at the international level and also earn ISU World Standing points. The 2026–27 Challenger Series consists of thirteen events, of which the Lombardia Trophy was the fourth.

== Changes to preliminary assignments ==
The International Skating Union published the preliminary list of entrants on 20 August 2026.

Date	Discipline	Withdrew	Ref.
7 September	Men	(Individual Neutral Athletes); Nikolai Ugozhaev	
7 September	Men	(Sweden); Hugo Bostedt	
7 September	Women	(Finland); Iida Karhunen	
7 September	Women	(South Africa); Gian-Quen Isaacs	
7 September	Women	(United States); Sarah Everhardt	
7 September	Ice dance	(Individual Neutral Athletes); Viktoryia Plaskonnaya; Uladzislau Sytsik	
14 September	Ice dance	(Israel); Shira Ichilov; Mikhail Nosovitskiy	
14 September	Ice dance	(Italy); Victoria Manni; Carlo Röthlisberger	

== Required performance elements ==
=== Single skating ===
Men and women competing in single skating first perform their short programs. Lasting no more than 2 minutes 40 seconds, the short program has to include the following elements:

For men: one double or triple Axel; one triple or quadruple jump; one jump combination consisting of a double jump and a triple jump, two triple jumps, or a quadruple jump and a double jump or triple jump; one flying spin; one camel spin or sit spin with a change of foot; one spin combination with a change of foot; and one step sequence using the full ice surface.

For women: one double or triple Axel; one triple jump; one jump combination consisting of a double jump and a triple jump, or two triple jumps; one flying spin; one layback spin, sideways leaning spin, camel spin, or sit spin without a change of foot; one spin combination with a change of foot; and one step sequence using the full ice surface.

Men and women then perform their free skates. The free skate can last no more than 4 minutes, and has to include the following: six jump elements, of which one has to be an Axel-type jump; three spins, of which one has to be a spin combination, one a flying spin, and one a choreographic spin; one step sequence; and a choreographic sequence.

=== Ice dance ===
Couples competing in ice dance first perform their rhythm dances. Lasting no more than 2 minutes 50 seconds, the theme of the rhythm dance this season is "Rhythm and Waltz". The rhythm dance has to include the following elements: one section of the Golden Waltz pattern dance, one creative dance element, one dance lift, one set of sequential twizzles, and one step sequence while not touching.

Couples then perform their free dances. The free dance can last no longer than 4 minutes, and has to include the following: three dance lifts or one short lift and one combination lift; one dance spin; one step sequence in hold; one set of synchronized twizzles, one one-foot turns sequence in hold, and two choreographic elements.

== Judging ==
Skaters are judged according to the required technical elements of their program (such as jumps and spins), as well as the overall presentation of their program, based on three program components (skating skills, presentation, and composition). Each technical element in a figure skating performance is assigned a predetermined base point value and scored by a panel of nine judges on a scale from −5 to +5 based on the quality of its execution. Each Grade of Execution (GOE) from –5 to +5 is assigned a value as indicated on the Scale of Values. For example, a triple Axel is worth a base value of 8.00 points, and a GOE of +3 is worth 2.40 points, so a triple Axel with a GOE of +3 earns 10.40 points. The judging panel's GOE for each element is determined by calculating the trimmed mean (the average after discarding the highest and lowest scores). The panel's scores for all elements are added together to generate a Total Elements Score. At the same time, the judges evaluate each performance based on the five aforementioned program components and assign each a score from 0.25 to 10 in 0.25-point increments. The judging panel's final score for each program component is also determined by calculating the trimmed mean. Those scores are then multiplied by the factor shown on the chart below; the results are added together to generate a total Program Component Score.

Program component factoring
Discipline	Short program or rhythm dance	Free skate or free dance
Men	1.67	3.33
Women	1.33	2.67
Ice dance	1.33	2.00

Deductions are applied for certain violations, such as time infractions, stops and restarts, or falls. The Total Elements Score and Program Component Score are then added together, minus any deductions, to generate a final performance score for each skater or team.

== Medal summary ==
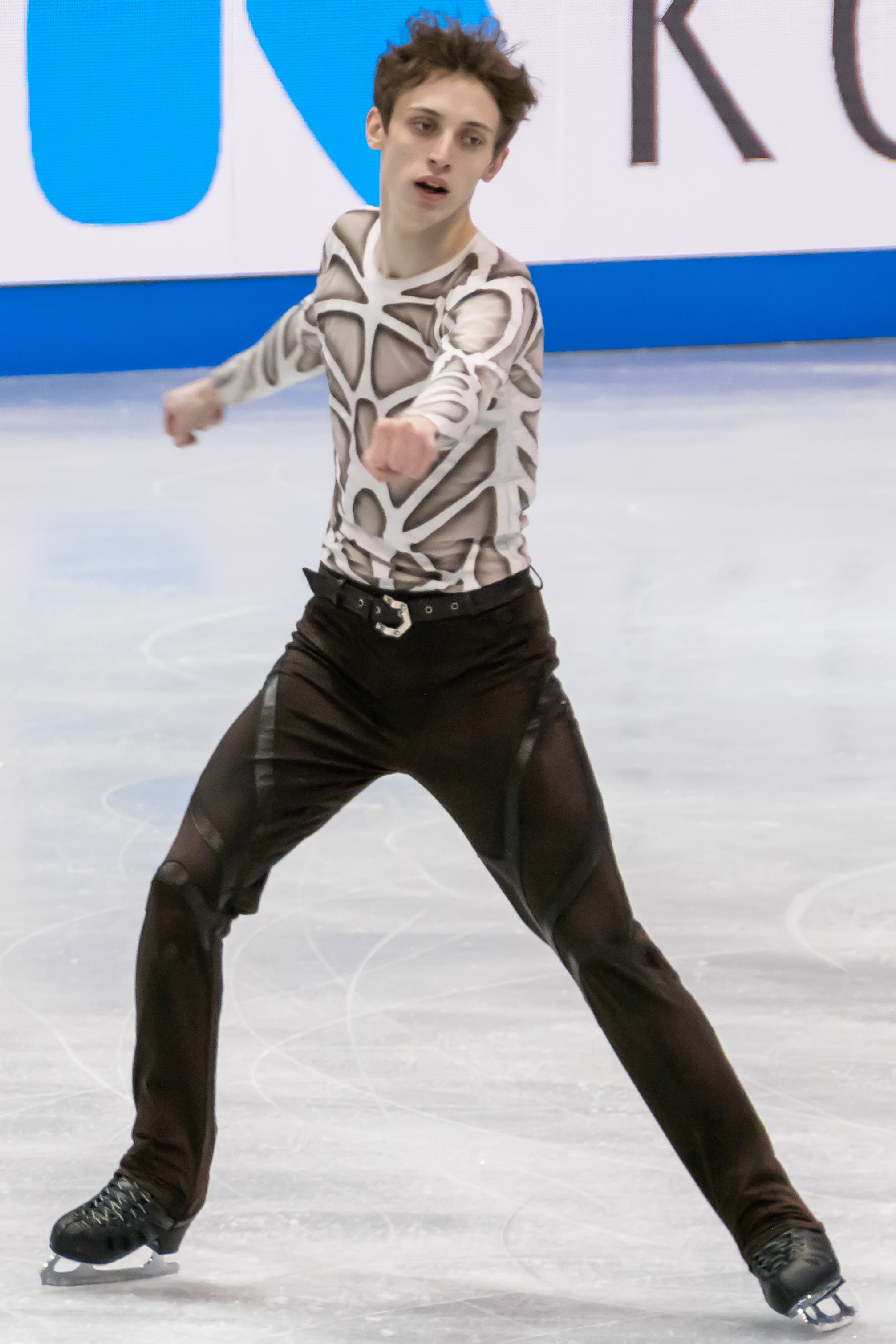
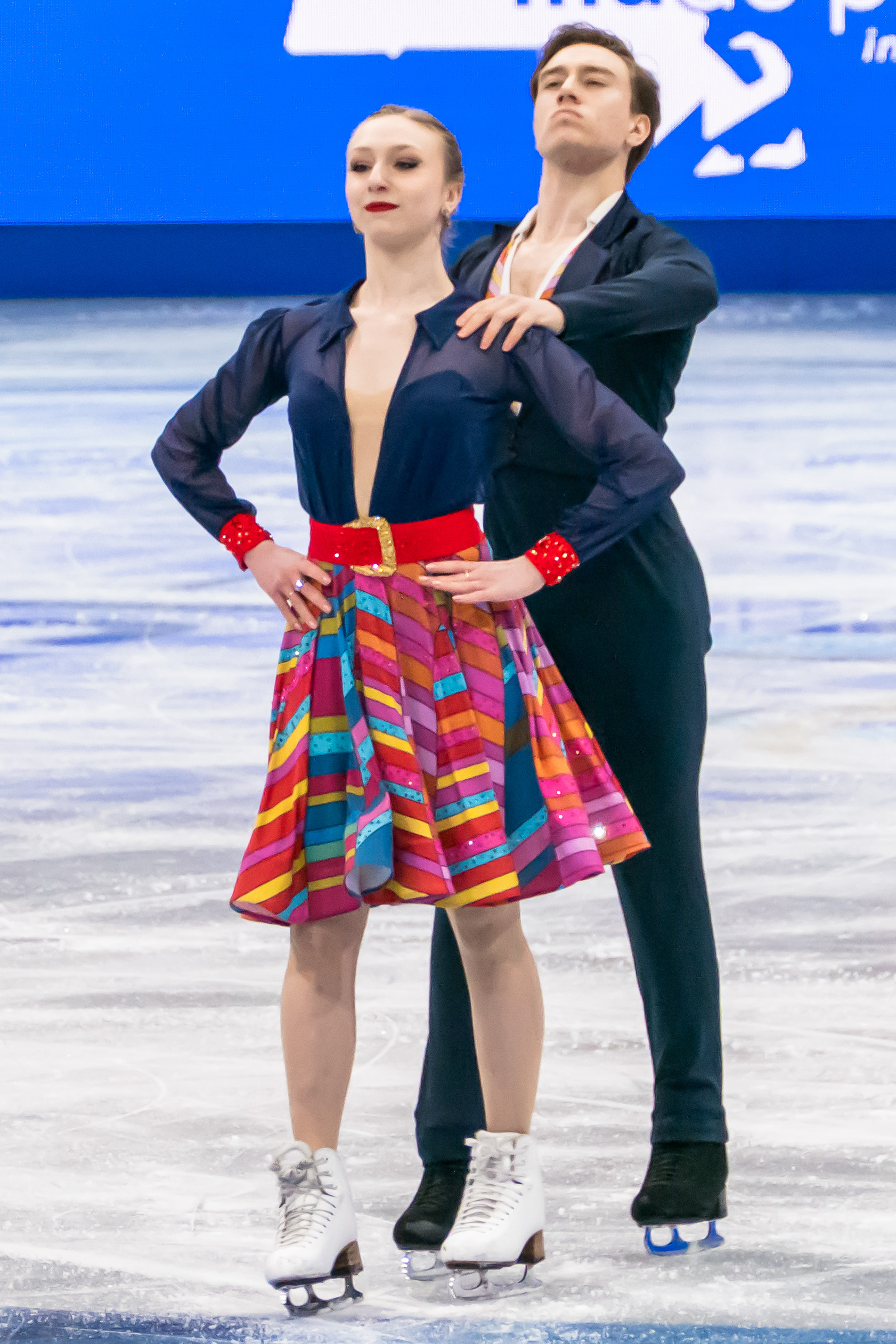
The 2026 Lombardia Trophy champions (from left to right): Mihhail Selevko of Estonia (men's singles); Niina Petrokina of Estonia (women's singles); and Kateřina Mrázková and Daniel Mrázek of the Czech Republic (ice dance)

Medalists
Discipline	Gold	Silver	Bronze
Men	(Estonia) Mihhail Selevko	(Individual Neutral Athletes) Matvei Vetlugin	(France) Corentin Spinar
Women	(Estonia) Niina Petrõkina	(South Korea) Shin Ji-a	(Italy) Lara Naki Gutmann
Ice dance	(Czech Republic); Kateřina Mrázková; Daniel Mrázek	(France); Evgeniia Lopareva; Geoffrey Brissaud	(United States); Emily Bratti; Ian Somerville

== Results ==
=== Men's singles ===
Men's results
Rank	Skater	Nation	Total points	SP		FS	
1st place, gold medalist(s)	Mihhail Selevko	Estonia	260.87	1	91.09	1	169.78
2nd place, silver medalist(s)	Matvei Vetlugin	(Individual Neutral Athletes) Individual Neutral Athlete	254.53	2	90.02	2	164.51
3rd place, bronze medalist(s)	Corentin Spinar	France	247.66	3	89.08	4	158.58
4	Kyrylo Marsak	Ukraine	237.53	6	78.16	3	159.37
5	Daniel Martynov	United States	223.14	7	75.37	5	147.77
6	Taira Shinohara	United States	219.14	5	79.38	6	139.76
7	Gabriele Frangipani	Italy	210.51	4	86.37	7	124.14
8	Fedirs Kuļišs	Latvia	191.44	8	74.84	8	116.60
9	Kirils Korkačs	Latvia	145.14	9	49.81	9	95.33
10	Dillon Judge	Ireland	120.59	10	43.50	10	77.09

=== Women's singles ===
Women's results
Rank	Skater	Nation	Total points	SP		FS	
1st place, gold medalist(s)	Niina Petrõkina	Estonia	210.41	1	77.20	2	133.21
2nd place, silver medalist(s)	Shin Ji-a	South Korea	209.26	2	74.93	1	134.33
3rd place, bronze medalist(s)	Lara Naki Gutmann	Italy	202.74	3	70.60	3	132.14
4	Yun Ah-sun	South Korea	188.51	5	60.60	4	127.91
5	Sarina Joos	Italy	174.13	7	57.89	5	116.24
6	Nina Pinzarrone	Belgium	170.92	10	56.05	6	114.87
7	Gioia Fiori	Italy	170.02	8	56.67	7	113.35
8	Anita Östlund	Sweden	157.89	9	56.14	8	101.75
9	Maria Eliise Kaljuvere	Estonia	157.84	4	63.52	10	94.32
10	Olivia Lisko	Finland	157.75	6	58.65	9	99.10
11	Barbora Tykalová	Czech Republic	146.19	13	54.16	12	92.03
12	Sara Franzi	Switzerland	144.35	15	51.56	11	92.79
13	Evelina Stavickytė	Lithuania	140.18	14	52.69	13	87.49
14	Anastasija Konga	Latvia	135.70	11	55.23	15	80.47
15	Elizabet Gervits	Israel	134.94	12	54.65	16	80.29
16	Michaela Vrašťáková	Czech Republic	133.09	16	51.36	14	81.73
17	Chiara Minighini	Italy	118.59	17	48.23	18	70.36
18	Marietta Atkins	Poland	113.13	18	42.39	17	70.74

=== Ice dance ===
Ice dance results
Rank	Team	Nation	Total points	RD		FD	
1st place, gold medalist(s)	Kateřina Mrázková; Daniel Mrázek	Czech Republic	188.61	2	75.75	1	112.86
2nd place, silver medalist(s)	Evgeniia Lopareva; Geoffrey Brissaud	France	187.35	1	79.21	2	108.14
3rd place, bronze medalist(s)	Emily Bratti; Ian Somerville	United States	178.03	4	71.24	3	106.79
4	Yuka Orihara; Juho Pirinen	Finland	175.04	3	71.93	4	103.11
5	Noemi Maria Tali; Noah Lafornara	Italy	164.11	7	63.88	5	100.89
6	Natacha Lagouge; Arnaud Caffa	France	162.06	6	64.63	7	97.43
7	Celina Fradji; Jean-Hans Fourneaux	France	161.56	5	65.85	8	95.71
8	Amy Cui; Jonathan Rogers	United States	159.48	9	60.47	6	99.01
9	Giulia Isabella Paolino; Andrea Tuba	Italy	149.24	8	62.19	11	87.05
10	Caroline Mullen; Brendan Mullen	United States	148.31	13	55.09	9	93.25
11	Chelsea Verhaegh; Sherim van Geffen	Netherlands	145.72	10	58.02	10	87.70
12	Emese Csiszér; Mark Shapiro	Hungary	134.90	11	57.95	12	76.95
13	Daniela Ivanitskiy; Matthew Sperry	Finland	115.88	14	49.73	14	66.15
14	Sophia Awny Farajallah; Maksym Spodyriev	Egypt	114.68	15	47.70	13	66.98
15	Denisa Cimlova; Stefano Frasca	Italy	110.59	12	55.81	15	54.78

== Works cited ==
- "Sports Rules – Single & Pair Skating and Ice Dance" (PDF). International Skating Union. Archived (PDF) from the original on 24 May 2026.
