= Robbie Tronco =

American club DJ from the Philadelphia

Robbie Tronco is an American club DJ from the Philadelphia, Pennsylvania area. Tronco has produced "Walk 4 Me" and "Runway as a house" along with "Fright Train". According to Louis Capet XXVI Recordings, the current publisher affiliate of Tronco's new releases, "Fright Train" stayed on the Billboard Dance Music Charts for 42 weeks and charted highest at #9 in January 1999. He also founded the TroncoDelphia record label in July 2007.
