= S-Tone Inc. =

- Also known as: S-Tone Inc., Arketipo, Cosmorama, Spacenuts
- Born: Stefano Tirone
- Origin: Milan, Italy
- Genres: multi-instrumentalist jazz, House, Jazz, Electronic, Future Jazz, Bossa Nova

S-Tone Inc. is Italian multi-instrumentalist jazz musician Stefano Tirone's main musical project. Originating from Milan, Italy, Tirone has been a professional musician for over twenty years. The first official S-Tone Inc. recording was released in 1992 during the acid jazz era, a formative time for Tirone, who was heavily influenced by the combination of soul, jazz and Latin rhythms of the period.

== Biography ==
=== Early years ===
He started playing music in the early 1980s during the new wave period. He graduated in architecture from Politecnico di Milano university and currently alternates between the two professions of architect and musician, though he has reportedly given priority to the latter in more recent years.

He has studied guitar and later piano for a certain period with Sonny Taylor (Mayafra Combo) and Antonio Zambrini, two pianists who have opened his mind towards new harmonic horizons. The activity as a producer starts in 1990 together with the dj Valenti with whom he has released the track "What's up" under the name Baby Doll House with the label Irma. From 1992 to 1994 he has collaborated with dj Don Carlos with whom he has created two projects, Montego Bay and Antigua Managua, which were based on 1970s disco samples with a house feel. In 1993 he participates to the compilation "Totally Wired Italia" released by the English label Acid Jazz with a track under the name Square Circle. Since 1994 he works for the labels of Luciano Cantone and Davide Rosa, the founders of Schema records, first with Milano 2000 and then with Schema from 2001.

=== Recordings ===
The first S-Tone Inc. album was released in 1996 with the name Love Unlimited and it contains in particular the track "Ainda Sonhar", which has been chosen for dozens of compilations all over the world. In 1997, with the name Cosmorama he released a monothematic album inspired by drum&bass, yet jazzy and soulful. In 1999, he released the second S-Tone Inc. album, Free Spirit. But it's with the album Sobrenatural released in 2002 that Stefano Tirone proved to have established his own style, made of various influences that go from Brazilian music, to jazz, funk, and soul, without forgetting his experience in house music. In 2003, he produced a 12" with Stefano Ghittoni, of The Dining Rooms, under the name Vuca. One of these tracks, "Bossafrica", has been later re-recorded during the sessions of the fourth S-Tone Inc. album.

In 2004, he produced the album Instalaçao do Samba for the Brazilian songwriter Tomaz Di Cunto who has chosen the name Toco for his project. During 2003 and 2004 he wrote and produced the tracks of his fourth album "Luz y Sombra", that has a more acoustic vein and features many musicians from the Milan jazz scene, plus five Brazilians. In particular the vocal guests are Laura Fedele, Toco, Manuela Ravaglioli, Adi Souza, Angie Brown and Luciana Cury from São Paulo. It also features a string quartet in two tracks. In November 2005, he has produced in Rio de Janeiro the second album of Toco titled Outro Lugar, with the participation of Roberto Menescal (bossa nova pioneer with Jobim and Gilberto) on guitar and some of the best Brazilian sidemen. The recordings were completed in Milan during spring/summer 2006 and was released on Schema records in February 2007. In April 2009, Schema Records released his fifth album Moon in Libra, which included new and old collaborations and a more intense approach to songwriting and producing. The album includes two cover versions, one of the popular "Stormy" revisited in a bossa nova mood and "My Only Man" by Italian composer Piero Umiliani and formerly sung by Helen Merrill.

Occasionally S-Tone Inc. have played live with various guests. He also has selected records in radio programs and clubs.

== Discography ==
- 1996 - Love Unlimited
- 1999 - Free Spirit
- 2002 - Sobrenatural
- 2005 - Luz Y Sombra
- 2009 - Moon In Libra
- 2013 - Lost & Found
- 2017 - Onda
- 2020 - Body & Soul
