= Eteri Tutberidze =

Russian-Georgian figure skating coach (born 1974)

- Tutberidze at the 2025 Skate Canada International

Personal information
- Native name: ეთერი გიორგის ასული თუთბერიძე / Этери Гогиевна Тутберидзе
- Full name: Eteri Georgievna Tutberidze
- Born: 24 February 1974 (age 52) Moscow, Russian SFSR, Soviet Union

Figure skating career
- Skating club: Sambo 70 (SDUSSHOR 37)
- Began skating: c. 1978

Eteri Georgievna Tutberidze (Georgian: ეთერი გიორგის ასული თუთბერიძე; Russian: Этери Георгиевна Тутберидзе; born 24 February 1974) is a Georgian-Russian figure skating coach who works mainly with female single skaters. She is head coach at the Sambo 70 (Khrustalni; Russian: Хрустальный) club in Moscow. She has coached several Russian skaters to success in international competitions, including 2022 Olympic and 2021 World champion Anna Shcherbakova, 2022 Olympic silver medalist and two-time Junior World champion Alexandra Trusova, 2020 Junior World champion Kamila Valieva, 2020 European Champion Alena Kostornaia, 2018 Olympic and 2019 World champion Alina Zagitova, two-time World champion and 2018 Olympic silver medalist Evgenia Medvedeva, and 2014 Olympic Team champion Yulia Lipnitskaya, as well as the Georgian skater and 2026 European champion Nika Egadze.

== Early life ==
Eteri Georgievna Tutberidze was born 24 February 1974 in Moscow, Russian SFSR, Soviet Union. Her father was Georgian, while her mother was of mixed Russian-Armenian heritage. She was the youngest of five children. Her mother was a senior engineer at the Ministry of Agricultural Construction and her father worked at the Likhachev plant's foundry and as a taxi driver. Growing up in Moscow, Tutberidze has stated that she was singled out in school for being a "Georgian girl" and had to work harder than others. Tutberidze studied at the Academy of Physical Education in Malakhovka and has received a degree in choreography from the Institute of Contemporary Art.

== Skating career ==
Tutberidze began skating at the age of four and a half, guided by Evgenia Zelikova and then Edouard Pliner. After sustaining a spinal fracture and growing 22 cm, she switched from singles to ice dancing. She was coached by Lidia Kabanova for two years and then joined Elena Tchaikovskaya, who paired her with Vyacheslav Chichekin. After briefly training under Natalia Linichuk, Tutberidze switched to Gennady Akkerman, her coach for the next three years. She skated with Alexei Kiliakov until he emigrated to the United States.

During the 1991–1992 season, Tutberidze trained under Tatiana Tarasova before deciding to perform in ice shows. Appearing as an adagio pair skater with Nikolai Apter, she toured with Ice Capades for several years.

Following the collapse of the Soviet Union, Tutberidze moved to the United States. There, she skated in ice shows for six years in the 1990s, including in Oklahoma at the time of the 1995 Oklahoma City bombing, for which she received compensation as a survivor. During her six years in the United States, she lived in Oklahoma City, Cincinnati, Los Angeles, and San Antonio.

== Coaching ==
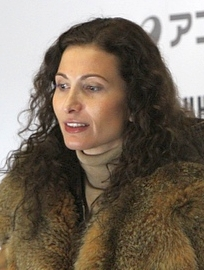
Tutberidze at the Junior Grand Prix Final in December 2010

Tutberidze began coaching in San Antonio, Texas. After returning to Russia, she coached at several Moscow rinks, including a hockey rink Serebrianyi, where ice time was limited for figure skaters. She then moved to Sambo 70 (SDUSSHOR 37) in Moscow, where she collaborates with Sergei Dudakov and Daniil Gleikhengauz.

External videos
- Assorted VK videos of Eteri Tutberidze students

=== Seniors ===
Skater	Country	Time Coached	Achievements under Tutberidze
Nika Egadze	(Georgia (country)) Georgia	2015–present	2021 CS Cup of Austria champion; 2022 CS Denis Ten Memorial Challenge champion; 2023 CS Denis Ten Memorial Challenge silver medalist; 2024 CS Denis Ten Memorial Challenge bronze medalist; 2023 CS Lombardia Trophy silver medalist; 2023 CS Nepela Memorial silver medalist; 2017 European Youth Olympic Festival bronze medalist; 2025 CS Denis Ten Memorial Challenge silver medalist; 2026 European Championships champion
Kamila Valieva	Russia	2018–2025, 2026–present	2020 World Junior champion; 2019–20 Junior Grand Prix Final champion; 2021 Skate Canada International champion; 2021 Rostelecom Cup champion; 2020 Russian Junior champion; 2021 Russian silver medalist
Alexandra Trusova	Russia	2016–May 2020, May 2021–October 2022, December 2025–present	2026 Skate America silver medalist; 2026 Cup of China silver medalist; 2026 CS Denis Ten Memorial Challenge champion; 2026 CS Kinoshita Group Cup silver medalist; 2022 Olympic silver medalist; 2022 European silver medalist; 2022 Russian champion; 2020 European bronze medalist; 2020 Russian bronze medalist; 2019 Grand Prix Final bronze medalist; 2019 Russian silver medalist; Two-time Junior World champion (2018, 2019); Two-time Russian Junior champion (2018, 2019); 2017 Junior Grand Prix Final champion
Sofia Akateva	Russia	2017–present	2021-22 Junior Grand Prix Poland gold medalist; 2021-22 Junior Grand Prix Russia gold medalist; Two-time Junior Russian champion (2021, 2022); 2020 Russian junior silver medalist; 2023 Russian senior Champion
Maiia Khromykh	Russia	2018–2024	2021 CS Warsaw Cup champion; 2021 Gran Premio d'Italia silver medalist; 2021 Rostelecom Cup bronze medalist; 2021 Russian Senior Championships 5th place; 2020 World Junior Championships 4th place
Daria Sadkova	Russia	2020–present	2024 Channel One Trophy champion; 2025 Channel One Trophy champion; 2025 Russian Figure Skating Championships silver medalist
Aleksandra Boikova/Dmitrii Kozlovskii	Russia	2023–present	2024 Russian senior silver medalists; 2025 Russian senior silver medalists; 2026 CS Kinoshita Group Cup champions; 2026 CS John Nicks International Pairs Competition champions
Alisa Dvoeglazova	Russia	2020–present	2024 Russian junior silver medalist; 2025 Russian junior silver medalist; 2026 Russian Figure Skating Championships silver medalist; 2026 Russian Grand Prix Final Gold medalist

=== Juniors ===
- Margarita Bazylyuk (Russia) → 2024 Russian junior champion, 1st at Russian Jumping Figure Skating Championships 2024
- Victoria Streltsova (Russia) → 2026 Russian junior bronze medalist
- Alena Prineva (Russia)

=== Former students ===
- Elizaveta Andreeva (Russia) → 2025 Russian junior 4th place, member of Red team at 2025 1TV trophy, gaining silver medal
- Arseny Fedotov (Russia) → 2023 and 2024 Russian junior champion, 1st at Russian Jumping Figure Skating Championships 2024
- Anna Shcherbakova (Russia) 2013–2022, 2022 Olympic Champion, 2021 World champion, Three-time Russian champion (2019, 2020, 2021), 2022 Russian silver medalist, European silver medalist (2020), European champion (2022), 2019 Grand Prix Final silver medalist, 2019 Junior World silver medalist, 2019 Russian Junior bronze medalist
- Daniil Samsonov (Russia) 2016-2025, 2019-20 Junior Grand prix Final bronze medalist, 2019 and 2020 Russian junior champion, 2019 JGP Latvia bronze medalist and 2019 JGP Poland champoin, 2024 Channel One Trophy champion.
- Kamilla Gainetdinova (Russia) (as a single skater)
- Polina Korobeynikova (Russia) (as a child)
- Daria Pavliuchenko (Russia) (as a single skater)
- Vladislav Tarasenko (Russia) (as a single skater)
- Polina Shelepen (Russia) (from age four until July 2012), two-time JGP Final silver medalist.
- Yulia Lipnitskaya (Russia) (from 2009 until November 2015), 2014 European champion, 2014 Olympic champion in the team event, 2014 World silver medalist.
- Serafima Sakhanovich (Russia) (during 2014–2015 season), 2015 World Junior silver medalist, 2014–2015 JGP Final silver medalist.
- Adian Pitkeev (Russia) (until March 2016), 2014 World Junior silver medalist, 2013–14 JGP Final silver medalist.
- Diana Davis (Russia) (until 2016 as a single skater, daughter of Eteri Tutberidze)
- Sergei Voronov (Russia) (from mid-2013 until March 2016), 2014 European silver medalist, 2014–2015 GP Final bronze medalist.
- Ilia Skirda (2013-2017) (Russia) JGP event silver medalist at two JGP events, qualified for 2016-17 JGP Final.
- Vladimir Samoilov (Russia) (during 2016-2017 season)
- Daria Panenkova (Russia) (until July 2018), JGP event gold and silver medalist, qualified for 2017-18 JGP Final.
- Polina Tsurskaya (2013-2018) (Russia) 2016 Youth Olympic champion, 2015–16 JGP Final champion.
- Anastasia Tarakanova (Russia) (during 2017-2018 season), 2017–18 JGP Final bronze medalist.
- Alina Zagitova (2015-December 2019) 2018 Olympic champion, 2019 World champion
- Veronika Zhilina (Russia) (during 2018-2019 season) (as a child)
- Yasmina Kadyrova (Russia) (during 2018-2019 season) (as a single skater)
- Alexey Erokhov (Russia) (until July 2020), 2018 Junior World champion.
- Alena Kanysheva (Russia) (during 2019-2020 season), 2018-19 JGP Final bronze medalist.
- Elizaveta Berestovskaya (Russia) (until May 2021)
- Elizabet Tursynbayeva (Kazakhstan) (2012-2013, June 2018 - September 2021), 2019 World silver medalist, 2019 Four Continents silver medalist, 2019 Winter Universiade silver medalist.
- Evgenia Medvedeva (2007-2018, September 2020- December 2021) (Russia) 2013–14 Grand Prix of Figure Skating Final junior ladies bronze medalist, 2014 World Junior Figure Skating Championships bronze medalist, 2014–15 Grand Prix of Figure Skating Final junior ladies champion, 2015 World Junior Figure Skating Championships champion, 2015–16 Grand Prix of Figure Skating Final ladies champion, 2016 World Figure Skating Championships champion, 2016 European champion, 2016–17 Grand Prix of Figure Skating Final ladies champion, 2017 World Figure Skating Championships champion, 2017 European champion, 2018 Olympic Games team silver medalist, women's singles silver medalist.
- Alena Kostornaia (Russia) (2017–2020, March 2021–March 2022), 2020 European champion, 2019 Grand Prix Final champion, 2018 Junior Grand Prix Final champion, 2018 Junior World silver medalist
- Morisi Kvitelashvili (2015-2022) (Georgia (country)) 2020 European bronze medalist, 2021 Rostelecom Cup champion, Two-time Rostelecom Cup silver medalist (2018, 2020), 2018 and 2022 Olympian, 2022 Worlds 4th place
- Daria Usacheva (Russia) (2016–2023), 2021 Skate America silver medalist, 2020 World Junior silver medalist, 2019 Junior Grand Prix Final bronze medalist, 2020 Russian Junior silver medalist, 2021 Russian Senior Championships 4th place
- Evgenia Tarasova / Vladimir Morozov (in collaboration with Maxim Trankov) (Russia) (April 2021– November 2023) 2022 European silver medalists, 2021 Skate America champions, 2021 NHK Trophy silver medalists, 2022 Russian & 2023 Russian bronze medalists, 2022 Winter Olympics silver medalists
- Egor Rukhin (Russia) (until February 2020, rejoined in 2021 after JGP series) → 4th at 2019 JGP France.
- Elena Kostyleva (Russia) (on two occasions)
- Adeliia Petrosian (Russia) (2019–July 2026), two-time Junior Russian Cup Final bronze medalist (2020, 2021), 2021-22 Junior Grand Prix champion, 2021 Russian Junior silver medalist, 2022 Junior Russian Cup Final silver medalist, 2022 Russian Senior bronze medalist, three-time Russian Senior champion (2024, 2025, 2026), two-time Russian Cup Final champion (2024, 2025), 2025 ISU Skate to Milano champion

== Controversies ==
Tutberidze's coaching methods have been criticized by fans, journalists, and skaters, especially in the wake of Kamila Valieva's doping scandal at the 2022 Beijing Olympics. The knowledge of the Sambo-70 club encouraging dehydration, starvation and unchanged practice regime despite injuries had been public even before Beijing, and critics had also noticed Tutberidze's students regularly retiring with serious injuries before the age of 18. Several of her male students, such as Daniil Samsonov and Adian Pitkeev, also suffered serious injuries under her training.

Valieva's doping controversy during the Olympics in 2022 saw a new wave of critical articles and figure skaters speaking out, with Romain Haguenauer, who coaches in Montreal, claiming that Tutberidze's training is "abusive, military even" and that "she wouldn't be allowed near children" if she used those practices in Montreal as a coach. Choreographer Benoît Richaud also spoke about the unsustainability of those methods and shortened careers. Figure skaters Adam Rippon and Katarina Witt publicly expressed support for Valieva, claiming that "adults around her have completely failed her" (Rippon) and that "the responsible adults should be banned from the sport forever" (Witt).

IOC president Thomas Bach expressed concern for Valieva's wellbeing, commenting "[Valieva] was received by her closest entourage with what appeared to be a tremendous coldness, it was chilling to see this, rather than giving her comfort, rather than to try to help her." President Vladimir Putin's spokesperson Dmitry Peskov called Bach's comments "deeply inappropriate", stating that "the harshness of a coach in high-level sport is key for their athletes to achieve victories."

Additionally, it has been noted by several critics and observers that it is common for Tutberidze to lash out at students who have left her academy for other coaches.

== Personal life ==
Tutberidze has one daughter, ice dancer Diana Davis, born 16 January 2003 in Las Vegas, Nevada. Diana was coached by her mother as a singles skater until 2016 when, at the insistence of her mother, she opted for ice dance. Tutberidze's daughter is a citizen of both the United States and Georgia.
