= Yasmina Kadyrova =

Russian pair skater (born 2004)

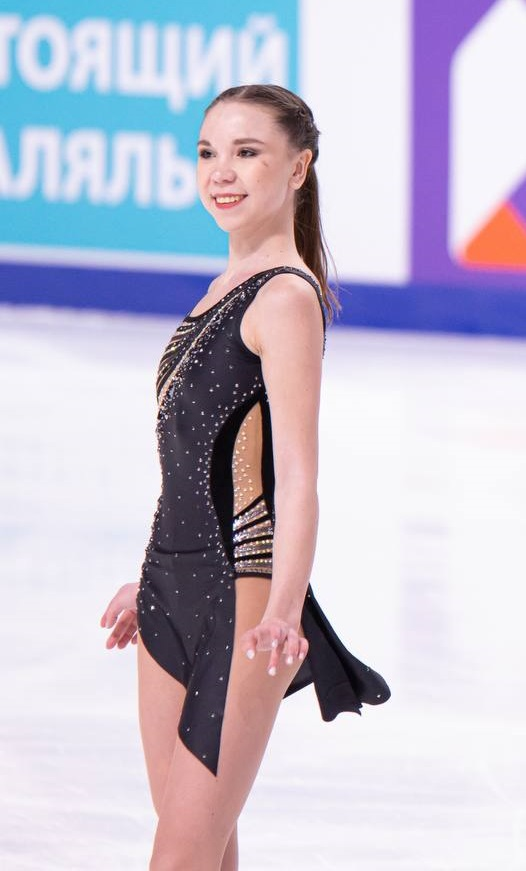
- Kadyrova at the 2024 Russian Championships

Personal information
- Native name: Ясмина Ринаровна Кадырова
- Full name: Yasmina Rinarovna Kadyrova
- Other names: Iasmina
- Born: 11 December 2004 (age 21) Kazan, Russia
- Home town: Saint Petersburg, Russia
- Height: 1.54 m (5 ft 1/2 in)

Figure skating career
- Country: Russia
- Partner: Ilya Mironov
- Coach: Tamara Moskvina, Artur Minchuk
- Skating club: Olympic School St. Petersburg
- Began skating: 2008

Yasmina Rinarovna Kadyrova (Russian: Ясмина Ринаровна Кадырова, Tatar: Ясминә Кадыйрова, romanized: Yäsminä Qadıyrowa; born 11 December 2004) is a Russian pair skater. With her former partner, Ivan Balchenko, she is the 2021 Rostelecom Cup bronze medalist.

== Personal life ==
Kadyrova was born on 11 December 2004 in Kazan, Russia. Her mother, Rezeda Sibgatullina, is a figure skating coach and director of Kazan's junior figure skating program. She has a younger sister, Riana, who is also a skater. Kadyrova and her family are Volga Tatars and identify as Muslim.

== Career ==
=== Early years ===
Kadyrova began learning to skate in 2008, coached first by her mother in Kazan. She trained in Kazan as a single skater until the 2016–17 season when she moved to St. Petersburg to train under Alexei Mishin and his wife, Tatiana. Kadyrova skated under Mishin for two seasons, only competing domestically, before being accepted into Eteri Tutberidze's camp in Moscow. She trained under Tutberidze for a portion of the 2018–19 season, during which time she was captured on video training a quadruple salchow; however, she was forced to leave the group due to injury and returned to her native Kazan to recover. Later in the season, she competed at her only international assignment as a single skater, the 2019 Children of Asia International Sports Games, where she finished fourth.

Kadyrova teamed up with her first partner, Ivan Balchenko, in September 2019. She'd admired pair skating since her time training under Alexei Mishin and was inspired to try the discipline after skating in an Art on Ice show in Switzerland with 2018 Olympic champion Aljona Savchenko. She relocated to Perm to skate with Balchenko under his coaches, Pavel Sliusarenko and Valentina Tiukova. Due to the six-year age gap between Kadyrova and Balchenko, the team was forced to begin their career as seniors, despite Kadyrova's lack of pairs experience. Kadyrova/Balchenko competed domestically in the Russian Cup series during the 2019–20 season and took silver at the Cup Final.

=== 2020–21 season ===
Kadyrova/Balchenko opened their season at the 2020 Russian test skates, an unscored event that allows the Russian Figure Skating Federation to evaluate the programs and condition of their national team members. They next competed at the second stage of the domestic Russian Cup series, the qualifying competition series to the national championships, in Moscow, where they finished second in a field of two behind Daria Pavliuchenko / Denis Khodykin. At their second Russian Cup assignment, the fourth stage in Kazan, they finished just off the podium in fourth place and, with a combined total of 28 points, qualified to nationals.

Although the team was not initially slated to compete at the event, Kadyrova/Balchenko were assigned to the 2020 Rostelecom Cup after Pavliuchenko/Khodykin withdrew due to illness in November. At the competition, Kadyrova/Balchenko placed fourth in both the short program and the free skate to place fourth overall, just behind training-mates Apollinariia Panfilova / Dmitry Rylov.

At the 2021 Russian Championships, their first nationals as a team, Kadyrova/Balchenko, cleanly skated their short program to place sixth in the segment amidst a strong field of competitors. The team fell to seventh in the free skate after struggling with their throw jumps but maintained their standing of sixth overall.

Kadyrova/Balchenko concluded their season at the end of February at the 2021 Russian Cup Final. They placed second in the short due to an uncharacteristic mistake from Daria Pavliuchenko / Denis Khodykin but were overtaken in the free skate and finished third in that segment and third overall.

On 25 May 2021, it was announced that Kadyrova/Balchenko had parted ways with coaches Pavel Sliusarenko and Valentina Tiukova to move to the camp of Tamara Moskvina and Artur Minchuk in St. Petersburg. It was reported that Kadyrova's mother, Rezeda Sibgatullina, brokered the move.

=== 2021–22 season ===
Kadyrova/Balchenko opened their international competitive season at the 2021 CS Denis Ten Memorial Challenge in October, where they won the bronze medal. At their next event and first ISU-sanctioned competition, the 2021 CS Warsaw Cup, Kadyrova/Balchenko placed third in both the short program and the free skate with personal best scores to win the bronze medal overall.

Having earned the Russian host pick in the pairs field at the 2021 Rostelecom Cup, Kadyrova/Balchenko made their ISU-sanctioned Grand Prix debut in November. At Rostelecom, the team again placed third in both segments of competition to earn the bronze medal.

Kadyrova/Balchenko finished ninth at the 2022 Russian Championships.

On April 18, it was announced that Kadyrova and Balchenko had split and that Kadryova was now paired with Valerii Kolesov.

== Programs ==
=== With Kolesov ===
Season	Short program	Free skating
2023-2024	Underground Storm (from The Truman Show) by Burkhard Dallwitz	The Csardas Princess by Emmerich Kálmán
2022–2023	Carmen by Georges Bizet	Who Wants to Live Forever by Queen performed by The Tenors

=== With Balchenko ===
Season	Short program	Free skating	Exhibition
2021–2022	Bolero for Violin and Orchestra by Vanessa-Mae choreo. by Nikolai Moroshkin	The Prince of Persia; I Remain by Alanis Morissette; Destiny; The Sands of Time (from Prince of Persia: The Sands of Time) by Harry Gregson-Williams choreo. by Nikolai Moroshkin	
2020–2021	Memoirs of a Geisha by John Williams choreo. by Ivan Malofeev	Devil and Angel by Maxime Rodriguez choreo. by Ivan Malofeev	Hello by Adele
2019–2020	Say Something by A Great Big World, feat. Christina Aguilera choreo. by Ivan Malofeev	Devil and Angel by Maxime Rodriguez choreo. by Ivan Malofeev	

=== As a single skater ===
Season	Short program	Free skating	Exhibition
2018–2019	Perhaps, Perhaps, Perhaps performed by The Pussycat Dolls	Le Musée by Maxime Rodriguez	

== Competitive highlights ==
GP: Grand Prix; CS: Challenger Series

=== With Mironov ===
National
Event	24–25
Russian Champ.	6th

=== With Kolesov ===
National
Event	22–23	23-24
Russian Champ.	4th	7th
Russian Cup Final (Note: The 2023 Russian Cup Final was renamed as the 2023 Russian Grand Prix Final.)	5th	
Team events
Channel One Trophy	2nd T 4th P	

=== With Balchenko ===
International
Event	19–20	20–21	21–22
GP Rostelecom Cup		4th	3rd
CS Warsaw Cup			3rd
Denis Ten Memorial			3rd
National
Russian Champ.		6th	9th
Russian Cup Final	2nd	3rd	
Russian Cup (Kazan)		4th	
Russian Cup (Moscow)		2nd	

=== As a single skater ===
International
Event	2018–19
Children of Asia ISG	4th

== Detailed results ==
=== With Kolesov ===
==== Senior ====
2023–2024 season
Date	Event	SP	FS	Total
20–24 December 2023	2024 Russian Championships	8; 71.47	8; 131.76	7; 203.23
10–13 November 2023	2023 Cup of Russia Series, 4th Stage	5; 69.03	6; 127.35	5; 196.38
27–30 October 2023	2023 Cup of Russia Series, 3rd Stage	3; 71.81	3; 133.89	3; 205.70
2022–23 season
Date	Event	SP	FS	Total
3–5 March 2023	2023 Russian Grand Prix Final	5; 77.32	5; 135.41	5; 212.73
21–22 January 2023	2023 Channel One Trophy	4; 78.18	4; 134.29	2T/4P; 212.47
20–26 December 2022	2023 Russian Championships	4; 76.68	4; 136.77	4; 213.45
18–21 November 2022	2022 Cup of Russia Series, 5th Stage	3; 71.68	2; 139.41	3; 211.49
4–7 November 2022	2022 Cup of Russia Series, 3rd Stage	2; 77.93	2; 147.02	2; 224.95

=== With Balchenko ===
==== Senior ====
2021–22 season
Date	Event	SP	FS	Total
December 21–26, 2021	2022 Russian Championships	6; 73.77	10; 115.13	9; 188.90
November 26–28, 2021	2021 Rostelecom Cup	3; 69.39	3; 124.19	3; 193.58
November 17–20, 2021	2021 CS Warsaw Cup	3; 67.53	3; 125.41	3; 192.94
October 28–31, 2021	2021 Denis Ten Memorial Challenge	3; 65.08	3; 115.05	3; 180.13
2020–21 season
Date	Event	SP	FS	Total
Feb. 26 – Mar. 2, 2021	2021 Russian Cup Final domestic competition	2; 70.93	3; 136.03	3; 206.96
December 23–27, 2020	2021 Russian Championships	6; 68.69	7; 127.35	6; 196.04
November 20–22, 2020	2020 Rostelecom Cup	4; 70.62	4; 134.05	4; 204.87
November 8–12, 2020	2020 Cup of Russia Series, 4th Stage, Kazan domestic competition	4; 71.95	4; 133.12	4; 205.07
October 10–13, 2020	2020 Cup of Russia Series, 2nd Stage, Moscow domestic competition	2; 64.69	2; 121.70	2; 186.39

=== As a single skater ===
==== Junior ====
2018–19 season
Date	Event	SP	FS	Total
February 13–15, 2019	2019 Winter Children of Asia ISG	4; 62.44	4; 126.74	4; 189.18
