= Sofia Samodurova =

Russian figure skater (born 2002)

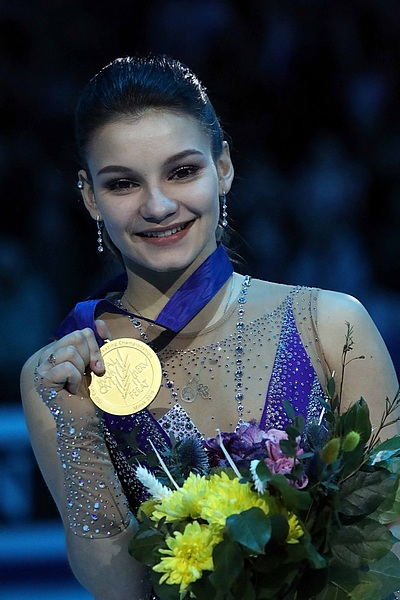
- With the gold medal of the 2019 European Figure Skating Championships

Personal information
- Native name: Софья Вячеславовна Самодурова (Russian)
- Full name: Sofia Vyacheslavovna Samodurova
- Born: 30 July 2002 (age 24) Krasnoyarsk, Krasnoyarsk Krai, Russia
- Height: 1.58 m (5 ft 2 in)

Figure skating career
- Country: Russia
- Skating club: Olympic School Zvezdnyi Led
- Began skating: 2007
- Retired: April 29, 2022
Medal record
Representing Russia
Figure skating: Ladies' singles
European Championships
Gold medal – first place	2019 Minsk	Ladies' singles
World Team Trophy
Bronze medal – third place	2019 Fukuoka	Team

Sofia Vyacheslavovna Samodurova (pronounced Sah-moh-DOO-roh-vah; Russian: Софья Вячеславовна Самодурова; born 30 July 2002) is a retired Russian figure skater. She is the 2019 European champion, the 2019 CS Ice Star champion, the 2018 Rostelecom Cup silver medalist, and the 2018 Skate America bronze medalist.

On the junior level, she is the 2017 JGP Croatia and 2017 JGP Italy champion. Since retiring from competition, she has been working as a skating coach.

== Personal life ==
Samodurova was born on 30 July 2002 in Krasnoyarsk, Krasnoyarsk Krai, Russia.

== Career ==
=== Early career ===
Samodurova began learning to skate in 2007. She finished sixteenth at the 2015 Russian Junior Championships and sixth the following year at the 2016 Russian Junior Championships

=== 2016–2017 season ===
Coached by Tatiana Mishina and Oleg Tataurov in Saint Petersburg, Samodurova finished fourth in her ISU Junior Grand Prix (JGP) debut, which took place in September 2016 in Yokohama, Japan. Called in as a reserve replacement, she placed ninth at her first senior nationals, the 2017 Russian Championships in December 2016. In February, she finished twelfth at the 2017 Russian Junior Championships. She culminated her season by winning a silver medal behind teammate Elizaveta Nugumanova at the Triglav Trophy.

=== 2017–2018 season ===
Coached by Mishina and Alexei Mishin, Samodurova started her season with gold at the 2017 JGP in Zagreb, Croatia, having obtained a total score 12 points greater than the silver medalist, Mako Yamashita. The following month, she edged out Alena Kostornaia by 0.04 for the gold at the JGP in Egna, Italy. Samodurova was the second-ranked qualifier (behind Alexandra Trusova) for the 2017–18 Junior Grand Prix Final in Nagoya, Japan. She finished sixth at the Final. Her season ended at the 2018 Russian Championships, where she finished eleventh.

=== 2018–2019 season ===
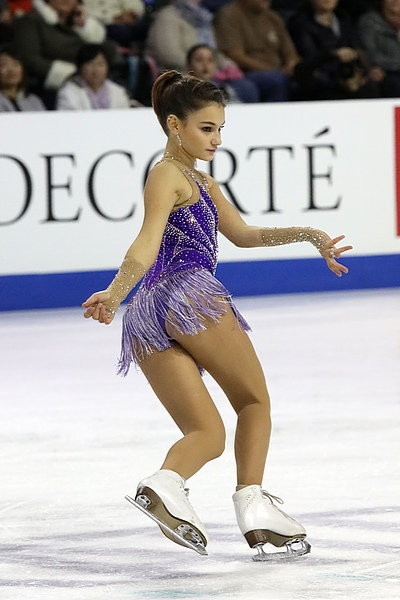
Samodurova at the 2018 Skate America

Samodurova started her season off at the 2018 CS Lombardia Trophy. Placing second in the short program and fourth in the free skate, she placed second overall, earning the silver medal, trailing behind fellow Russian competitor Elizaveta Tuktamysheva. She made her Grand Prix debut at Skate America, where she won the bronze medal behind Satoko Miyahara and Kaori Sakamoto with a personal best score of 198.70 points. In mid-November she competed at the 2018 Rostelecom Cup where she won the silver medal behind Alina Zagitova after placing second in both programs. With one Grand Prix silver medal and one bronze medal she qualified for the 2018–19 Grand Prix Final, where she finished fifth with a personal best score of 204.33 points: "Achieving the season's best was great. I believe that today I did everything to the maximum."

At the 2019 Russian Championships, Samodurova placed sixth in both programs and overall. She was the third-ranked skater eligible to compete at senior international competitions, behind Stanislava Konstantinova and Alina Zagitova. At the 2019 European Championships in Minsk, Samodurova placed second in the short program behind Zagitova, passed the 70-point mark for the first time. In the free program, Zagitova skated poorly, while Samodurova skated a clean program and won the European title ahead of Zagitova and Finnish figure skater Viveca Lindfors. Of the result, she said "I can't find words to describe what I am feeling now. I am European Champion and that's so awesome!"

Samodurova was assigned to the World Championships in Saitama along with Zagitova and Evgenia Medvedeva. She placed ninth in the short program, and expressed disappointment that her scores were lower than those at the European Championships. She rose to eighth place in the free skate, making only one minor error on a double jump, and said she felt "only happiness" with the result. Samodurova concluded the season as part of the bronze medal-winning Team Russia at the 2019 World Team Trophy.

Samodurova competing at the 2019 Cup of China

=== 2019–2020 season ===
Samodurova admitted to having some issues in training for the new season after falling multiple times at the Russian test skate events. On the Challenger series, she placed sixth at the 2019 CS Lombardia Trophy before winning the 2019 CS Ice Star. On the Grand Prix, she was fifth at the 2019 Cup of China, after struggling with underrotations on several jumping passes. Fourth at the 2019 CS Golden Spin of Zagreb, she finished the season with a ninth-place finish at the 2020 Russian Championships.

=== 2020–2021 season ===
Samodurova performed her short program at the senior Russian test skates, but withdrew from the free skate due to a cold. She placed fourth at both the second and third stages of the Russian Cup series, qualifying for the 2020 Russian Championships.

With the COVID-19 pandemic limiting international travel, Samodurova competed at the 2020 Ice Star, winning the bronze medal. She was assigned to the 2020 Rostelecom Cup, the ISU having run the Grand Prix based mainly on geographic location. She was sixth in the short program, but dropped to seventh place after the free skate. At the 2021 Russian Championships, Samodurova placed tenth.

=== 2021–2022 season ===
Samodurova picked music from Harry Gregson-Williams' Mulan score for the free program, citing parallels between the title character and her own life as a "fighter." She made her season debut at the 2021 Budapest Trophy, winning the bronze medal. Samodurova's lone Grand Prix assignment for the season was initially the 2021 Cup of China, but following its cancellation she was reassigned to the 2021 Gran Premio d'Italia in Turin. She placed seventh at the event, and pronounced herself "really happy" with her free skate despite a triple flip error.

At the 2022 Russian Championships, Samodurova finished in eleventh place.

Following the national championships, Samodurova decided to retire, and informed her coach that she intended to move to Kazakhstan to live with her parents and extended family. However, her coach Alexei Mishin persuaded her to remain as a coach at his skating school working with younger children.

== Programs ==
Season	Short program	Free skating	Exhibition
2021–2022	New Rules by Dua Lipa choreo. by Florent Amodio	Mulan by Harry Gregson-Williams choreo. by Nikolai Morozov	
2020–2021	The Man With the Harmonica by Apollo 440 choreo. by Roman Kostomarov	Makeba by Jain; Replay by René Aubry; Mah Nà Mah Nà performed by Moa choreo. by Nikita Mikhailov	Wherever, Whenever by Shakira
2019–2020	Bamboléo by The Gipsy Kings choreo. by Tatiana Prokofieva	El Tango de Roxanne (from Moulin Rouge!) performed by Ewan McGregor, José Feliciano and Jacek Koman choreo. by Tatiana Prokofieva	
2018–2019	Nyah (from Mission: Impossible 2) by Hans Zimmer	Welcome to Burlesque (from Burlesque) performed by Cher; Show Me How You Burlesque (from Burlesque) performed by Christina Aguilera choreo. by Ilia Averbukh	Hava Nagila (Jewish folk song); All by Myself performed by Celine Dion
2017–2018	Hava Nagila (Jewish folk song)	Libertango by Astor Piazzolla	
2016–2017	Send In the Clowns performed by Susan Boyle	Medley by Gioachino Rossini	
2015–2016	unknown	Dracula 3D by Claudio Simonetti	
2014–2015	Carnaval de Paris by Dario G	The Pink Panther by Henry Mancini; The Pink Panther by Christophe Beck	

== Competitive highlights ==
Samodurova alongside medalists Kaori Sakamoto and Satoko Miyahara ất the 2018 Skate America

GP: Grand Prix; CS: Challenger Series; JGP: Junior Grand Prix

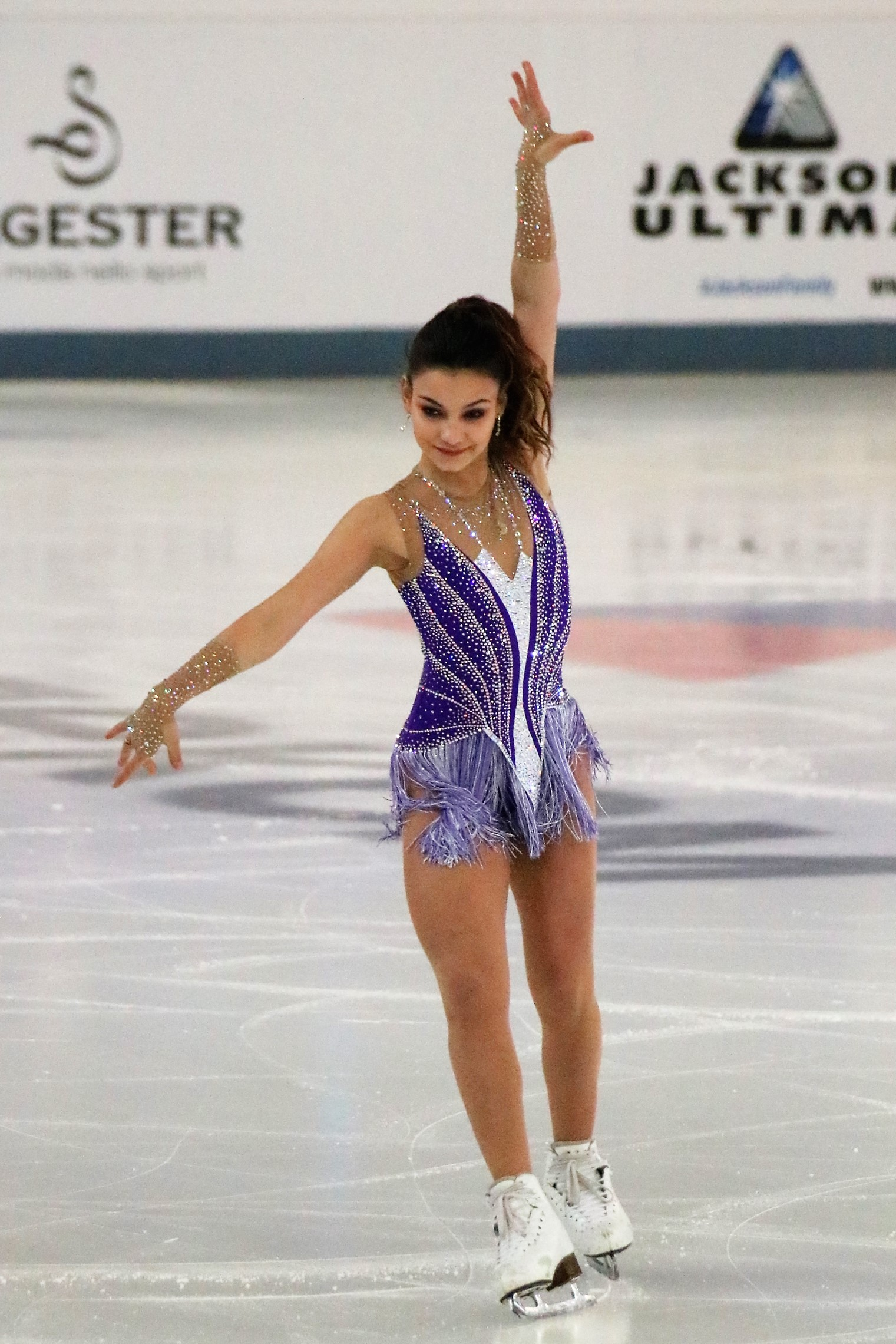
At the 2019 Russian Figure Skating Championships

International
Event	14–15	15–16	16–17	17–18	18–19	19–20	20–21	21–22
Worlds					8th			
Europeans					1st			
GP Final					5th			
GP Cup of China						5th		C
GP Italy								7th
GP NHK Trophy						6th		
GP Rostelecom					2nd		7th	
GP Skate America					3rd			
CS Finlandia						WD		
CS Golden Spin						4th		
CS Ice Star						1st		
CS Lombardia					2nd	6th		
Budapest Trophy								3rd
Ice Star							3rd	
International: Junior
JGP Final				6th				
JGP Croatia				1st				
JGP Italy				1st				
JGP Japan			4th					
NRW Trophy		2nd N						
Triglav Trophy			2nd					
National
Russian Champ.			9th	11th	6th	9th	10th	10th
Russian Junior	16th	6th	12th					
Russian Cup Final			7th J				8th	
Team events
World Team Trophy					3rd T 5th P			
TBD = Assigned; WD = Withdrew; C = Cancelled; Levels: N = Advanced novice; J = Junior; T = Team result; P = Personal result. Medals awarded for team result only.

== Detailed results ==
=== Senior level ===
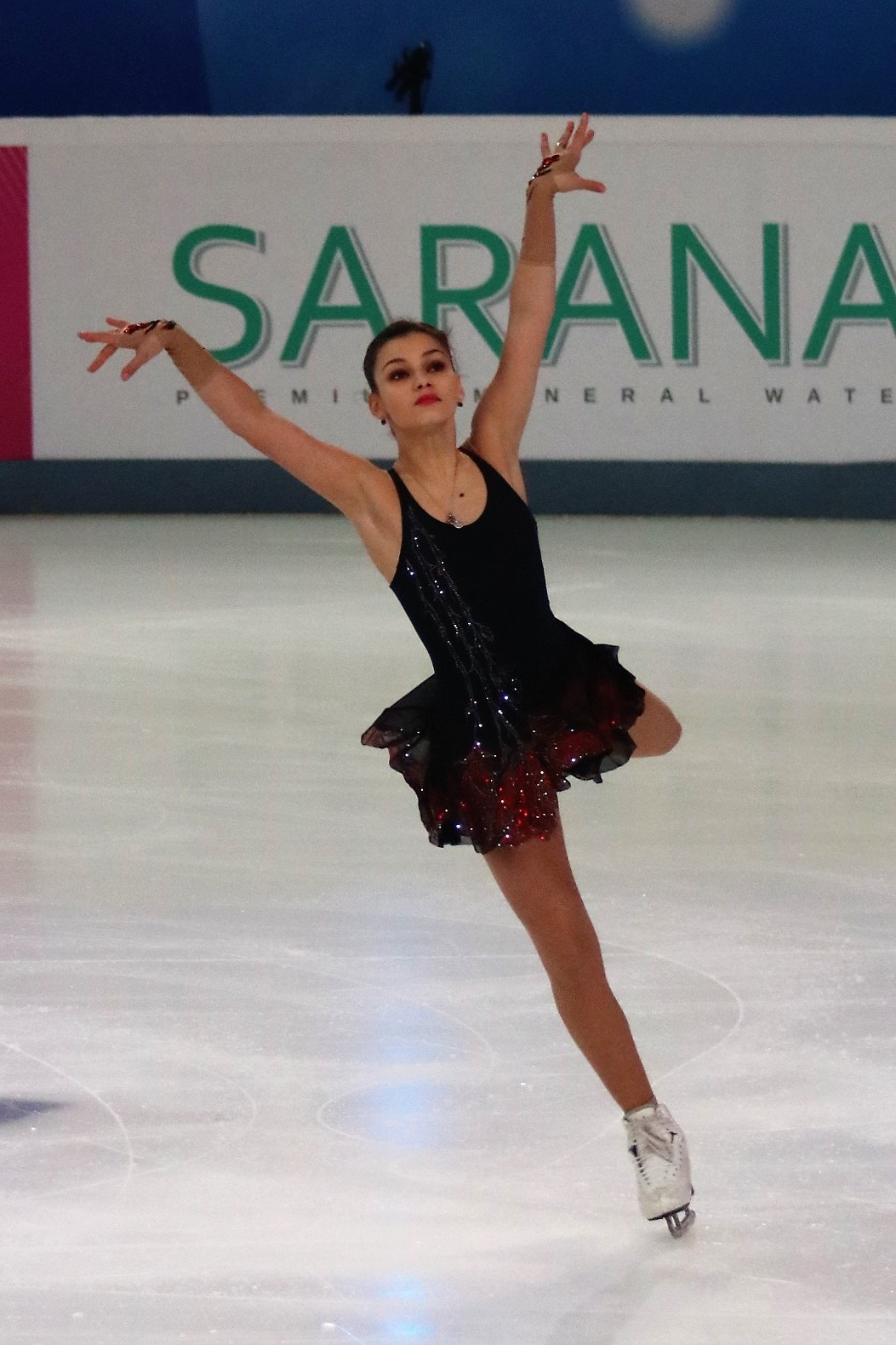
Samodurova at the 2019 Russian Championships.

Small medals for short and free programs awarded only at ISU Championships. At team events, medals awarded for team results only. Personal bests highlighted in bold.

2021–22 season
Date	Event	SP	FS	Total
21–26 December 2021	2022 Russian Championships	11; 68.30	14; 115.96	11; 184.26
5–7 November 2021	2021 Gran Premio d'Italia	9; 58.68	7; 121.91	7; 180.59
14–17 October 2021	2021 Budapest Trophy	3; 67.15	3; 123.76	3; 190.91
**2020–2021 season**
Date	Event	SP	FS	Total
26 February – 2 March 2021	2021 Russian Cup Final domestic competition	7; 68.92	8; 130.96	8; 199.88
23–27 December 2020	2021 Russian Championships	10; 67.70	11; 128.58	10; 196.28
20–22 November 2020	2020 Rostelecom Cup	6; 68.01	8; 116.80	7; 184.81
29 Oct. – 1 Nov. 2020	2020 Ice Star	2; 66.77	3; 112.37	3; 179.14
**2019–2020 season**
24–29 December 2019	2020 Russian Championships	11; 64.38	11; 127.70	9; 192.08
4–7 December 2019	2019 CS Golden Spin of Zagreb	4; 59.57	3; 121.04	4; 180.61
22–24 November 2019	2019 NHK Trophy	7; 63.85	6; 119.42	6; 183.27
8–10 November 2019	2019 Cup of China	5; 63.99	5; 121.30	5; 185.29
18–20 October 2019	2019 CS Ice Star	1; 62.23	1; 124.93	1; 187.16
13–15 September 2019	2019 CS Lombardia Trophy	8; 53.82	4; 125.83	6; 179.65
**2018–2019 season**
Date	Event	SP	FS	Total
11–14 April 2019	2019 World Team Trophy	6; 68.61	4; 138.84	3T/5P; 207.45
18–24 March 2019	2019 World Championships	9; 70.42	8; 138.16	8; 208.58
21–27 January 2019	2019 European Championships	2; **72.88**	1; **140.96**	1; **213.84**
19–23 December 2018	2019 Russian Championships	6; 71.82	6; 137.95	6; 209.77
6–9 December 2018	2018–19 Grand Prix Final	5; 68.24	5; 136.09	5; 204.33
16–18 November 2018	2018 Rostelecom Cup	2; 67.40	2; 130.61	2; 198.01
19–21 October 2018	2018 Skate America	3; 64.41	3; 134.29	3; 198.70
12–16 September 2018	2018 CS Lombardia Trophy	2; 64.05	4; 120.77	2; 184.82

=== Junior level ===
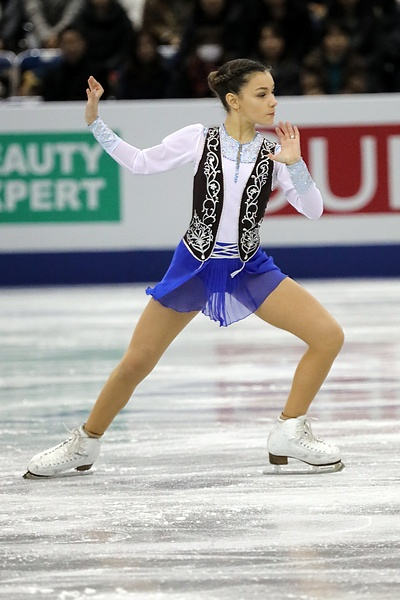
Samodurova at the 2017–18 JGP Final.

Personal bests highlighted in italic.

**2017–2018 season**
Date	Event	Level	SP	FS	Total
21–24 December 2017	2018 Russian Championships	Senior	9; 67.07	11; 129.44	11; 196.51
7–10 December 2017	2017–18 JGP Final	Junior	6; 65.01	6; 122.73	6; 187.74
11–14 October 2017	2017 JGP Italy	Junior	3; 66.67	1; 125.52	1; 192.19
27–30 September 2017	2017 JGP Croatia	Junior	3; 62.43	1; 125.43	1; 187.86
**2016–2017 season**
Date	Event	Level	SP	FS	Total
5–9 April 2017	2017 Triglav Trophy	Junior	2; 58.48	2; 113.03	2; 171.51
1–5 February 2017	2017 Russian Junior Championships	Junior	9; 63.24	13; 113.46	12; 176.70
20–26 December 2016	2017 Russian Championships	Senior	8; 65.29	8; 126.87	9; 192.16
7–11 September 2016	2016 JGP Japan	Junior	4; 60.76	3; 119.93	4; 180.69
**2015–2016 season**
Date	Event	Level	SP	FS	Total
21–23 January 2016	2016 Russian Junior Championships	Junior	10; 59.39	5; 115.23	6; 174.62
24–29 November 2015	2015 NRW Trophy	Novice	2; 43.96	2; 82.60	2; 126.56
**2014–2015 season**
Date	Event	Level	SP	FS	Total
4–7 February 2015	2015 Russian Junior Championships	Junior	17; 43.54	13; 92.52	16; 136.06
