= Ivan Balchenko =

Russian pair skater (born 1999)

Personal information
- Native name: Иван Андреевич Бальченко
- Full name: Ivan Andreevich Balchenko
- Born: 19 June 1999 (age 27) Rostov-on-Don, Russia
- Home town: Saint Petersburg, Russia
- Height: 1.74 m (5 ft 8 1/2 in)

Figure skating career
- Country: Russia
- Coach: Tamara Moskvina, Artur Minchuk
- Skating club: Olympic School St. Petersburg
- Began skating: 2006

Ivan Andreevich Balchenko (Russian: Иван Андреевич Бальченко, born 19 June 1999) is a Russian pair skater. With his former partner, Yasmina Kadyrova, he is the 2021 Rostelecom Cup bronze medalist.

== Personal life ==
Balchenko was born on 19 June 1999 in Rostov-on-Don, Russia. His younger sister, Darina, is also a skater.

== Career ==
=== Early years ===
Balchenko began learning how to skate in 2006. Until the 2015–16 season, he trained as a single skater at Sports School #6 in his native Rostov-on-Don before switching to pairs. During the first four seasons of his career as a pair skater, Balchenko changed partners four times, skating with Diana Mitina, Alina Solovyova, Sofya Dmitrenko, and Natalia Khabibullina each a season. Khabibullina/Balchenko competed at one international event, the 2018 Ice Star, where they placed second in the junior division, before splitting at the end of the 2018–19 season.

Balchenko teamed up with his current partner, Yasmina Kadyrova, in September 2019. Kadyrova relocated to Perm to train with Balchenko and his coaches, Pavel Sliusarenko and Valentina Tiukova. Due to the six year age gap between Kadyrova and Balchenko, the team were forced to begin their career as seniors, despite Kadyrova's lack of pairs experience. Kadyrova/Balchenko competed domestically in the Russian Cup series during the 2019–20 season and took silver at the Cup Final.

=== 2020–21 season ===
Kadyrova/Balchenko opened their season at the 2020 Russian test skates, an unscored event which allows the Russian Figure Skating Federation to evaluate the programs and condition of their national team members. They next competed at the second stage of the domestic Russian Cup series, the qualifying competition series to the national championships, in Moscow, where they finished second in a field of two behind Pavliuchenko/Khodykin. At their second Russian Cup assignment, the fourth stage in Kazan, they finished just off the podium in fourth place, and with a combined total of 28 points qualified to nationals.

Although the team was not initially slated to compete at the event, Kadyrova/Balchenko were assigned to the 2020 Rostelecom Cup after Pavliuchenko/Khodykin withdrew due to illness in November. At the competition, Kadyrova/Balchenko placed fourth in both the short program and the free skate to place fourth overall, just behind training-mates Panfilova/Rylov.

At the 2021 Russian Championships, their first nationals as a team, Kadyrova/Balchenko cleanly skated their short program to place sixth in the segment amidst a strong field of competitors. The team fell to seventh in the free skate after struggling with their throw jumps, but maintained their standing of sixth overall.

Kadyrova/Balchenko concluded their season at the end of February at the 2021 Russian Cup Final. They placed second in the short due to an uncharacteristic mistake from Daria Pavliuchenko/Denis Khodykin, but were overtaken in the free skate and finished third in that segment and third overall.

On 25 May 2021, it was announced that Kadyrova/Balchenko had parted ways with coaches Pavel Sliusarenko and Valentina Tiukova to move to the camp of Tamara Moskvina and Artur Minchuk in St. Petersburg. It was reported that Kadyrova's mother, Rezeda Sibgatullina, brokered the move.

=== 2021–22 season ===
Kadyrova/Balchenko opened their international competitive season at the 2021 CS Denis Ten Memorial Challenge in October where they won the bronze medal. At their next event, and their first ISU-sanctioned competition, the 2021 CS Warsaw Cup, Kadyrova/Balchenko placed third in both the short program and the free skate with personal best scores to win the bronze medal overall.

Having earned the Russian host pick in the pairs field at the 2021 Rostelecom Cup, Kadyrova/Balchenko made their ISU-sanctioned Grand Prix debut in November. At Rostelecom, the team again placed third in both segments of competition to earn the bronze medal.

Kadyrova/Balchenko finished ninth at the 2022 Russian Championships.

On April 18, it was announced that Kadryova and Balchenko had split.

== Programs ==
=== With Kadyrova ===
Season	Short program	Free skating	Exhibition
2021–2022	Bolero for Violin and Orchestra by Vanessa-Mae choreo. by Nikolai Moroshkin	The Prince of Persia; I Remain by Alanis Morissette; Destiny; The Sands of Time (from Prince of Persia: The Sands of Time) by Harry Gregson-Williams choreo. by Nikolai Moroshkin	
2020–2021	Memoirs of a Geisha by John Williams choreo. by Ivan Malofeev	Devil and Angel by Maxime Rodriguez choreo. by Ivan Malofeev	Hello by Adele
2019–2020	Say Something by A Great Big World, feat. Christina Aguilera choreo. by Ivan Malofeev	Devil and Angel by Maxime Rodriguez choreo. by Ivan Malofeev	

== Competitive highlights ==
GP: Grand Prix; CS: Challenger Series

=== With Kadyrova ===
International
Event	19–20	20–21	21–22
GP Rostelecom Cup		4th	3rd
CS Warsaw Cup			3rd
Denis Ten Memorial			3rd
National
Russian Champ.		6th	9th
Russian Cup Final	2nd	3rd	
Russian Cup (Kazan)		4th	
Russian Cup (Moscow)		2nd	

=== With Khabibullina ===
International: Junior
Event	2018–19
Minsk-Arena Ice Star	2nd

== Detailed results ==
With Kadyrova

2021–22 season
Date	Event	SP	FS	Total
December 21–26, 2021	2022 Russian Championships	6; 73.77	10; 115.13	9; 188.90
November 26–28, 2021	2021 Rostelecom Cup	3; 69.39	3; 124.19	3; 193.58
November 17–20, 2021	2021 CS Warsaw Cup	3; 67.53	3; 125.41	3; 192.94
October 28–31, 2021	2021 Denis Ten Memorial Challenge	3; 65.08	3; 115.05	3; 180.13
2020–21 season
Date	Event	SP	FS	Total
Feb. 26 – Mar. 2, 2021	2021 Russian Cup Final domestic competition	2; 70.93	3; 136.03	3; 206.96
December 23–27, 2020	2021 Russian Championships	6; 68.69	7; 127.35	6; 196.04
November 20–22, 2020	2020 Rostelecom Cup	4; 70.62	4; 134.05	4; 204.87
November 8–12, 2020	2020 Cup of Russia Series, 4th Stage, Kazan domestic competition	4; 71.95	4; 133.12	4; 205.07
October 10–13, 2020	2020 Cup of Russia Series, 2nd Stage, Moscow domestic competition	2; 64.69	2; 121.70	2; 186.39

With Khabibullina

2018–19 season
Date	Event	Level	SP	FS	Total
October 18–21, 2018	2018 Minsk-Arena Ice Star	Junior	3; 45.29	2; 97.98	2; 143.27
