= Elizaveta Nugumanova =

Russian figure skater

- Nugumanova at the 2023 Union of Champions

Personal information
- Native name: Елизавета Игоревна Нугуманова
- Full name: Elizaveta Igorevna Nugumanova
- Born: 25 August 2002 (age 24) Saint Petersburg, Russia
- Home town: Saint Petersburg
- Height: 1.58 m (5 ft 2 in)

Figure skating career
- Country: Russia
- Coach: Elena Sokolova
- Skating club: Olympic School St. Petersburg
- Began skating: 2005

Elizaveta Igorevna Nugumanova (Russian: Елизавета Игоревна Нугуманова; born 25 August 2002) is a Russian figure skater. She is the 2019 CS Warsaw Cup bronze medalist and has won two medals on the ISU Junior Grand Prix series.

== Personal life ==
Elizaveta Nugumanova was born on 25 August 2002 in Saint Petersburg, Russia.

== Career ==
=== Early career ===
Nugumanova competed in the 2015 Russian Junior Championships where she finished fifth. The following season she competed in the Denkova-Staviski Cup, claiming the advanced novice gold medal. That same season she finished fourth at the 2016 Russian Junior Championships, behind Alisa Fedichkina.

=== Junior career ===
==== 2016–2017 season ====
Nugumanova made her debut in the Junior Grand Prix for the 2016-17 season. Her first event was the JGP Russia where she won the bronze medal. She won the silver medal in her second event at the JGP Estonia, earning personal best scores in the short and free skate with a total of 188.43 points. As the first substitute for the JGP Final, Nugumanova was called up when Polina Tsurskaya decided to withdraw. At the JGP Final she placed fifth. Nugumanova ended her season with an eleventh-place finish at the 2017 Russian Junior Championships.

Following the season, Nugumanova left her long-time coaches, Tatiana Mishina and Alexei Mishin, to train with Angelina Turenko.

==== 2017–2018 season ====
Nugumanova would place eleventh for the second consecutive year at the 2018 Russian Junior Championships.

Nugumanova performing a spiral at the 2019 Russian Figure Skating Championships

=== Senior career ===
==== 2018–2019 season ====
Competing at the 2019 Russian Championships, Nugumanova's first senior nationals competition, she placed seventeenth.

Nugumanova would part ways with Angelina Turenko following that season to begin training under Evgeni Rukavicin.

==== 2019–2020 season ====
Making her senior international debut, Nugumanova win the bronze medal at the 2019 CS Warsaw Cup behind Ekaterina Kurakova and Bradie Tennell. She then went on to finish fourteenth at the 2020 Russian Championships.

Nugumanova competing at the 2020 Russian Cup

==== 2020–2021 season ====
Due to the ongoing COVID-19 pandemic, a large number of modifications were made to the 2020–21 Grand Prix structure. The competitors at the 2020 Rostelecom Cup consisted only of skaters from Russia, skaters already training in the host nation, and skaters assigned to that event for geographic reasons. Nugumanova was thus chosen as one of the Russian skaters to participate at the event, where she finished fifth of the eleven skaters.

Nugumanova would then compete at the 2021 Russian Championships a couple of months later, finishing in sixth-place.

==== 2021–2022 season: Injury ====
During the 2021–22 figure skating season, Nugumanova struggled with numerous health problems, including a nagging back injury that kept her out of competitions for the whole season.

In the spring of 2022, she would switch coaches from Evgeni Rukavicin to Elena Sokolova. Following this split, Nugumanova alleged that Rukavicin and his staff had constantly bullied her about her weight throughout her time training under him. She also stated that Rukavicin would threaten her into submission by saying that he would "use his connections" to end her figure skating career. Moreover, Nugumanova claimed that Valentin Molotov, one of her choreographers that worked alongside Rukavicin, had once threatened to kill her.

As of 2026, Nugumanova has not appeared in competitions since the 2021–22 season.

== Programs ==
Season	Short program	Free skating	Exhibition
2021–2022	Die Fledermaus by Johann Strauss II	Part of Your World (from The Little Mermaid) by Alan Menken	Exhibit by Leningrad; Buttons by The Pussycat Dolls
2020–2021	Die Fledermaus by Johann Strauss II	Dusk Till Dawn by Zayn feat. Sia	Let's Get Loud by Jennifer Lopez
2019–2020	Nowadays / Hot Honey Rag (from Chicago) performed by Renée Zellweger and Catherine Zeta-Jones	Pas de Deux (from The Nutcracker) by Pyotr Ilyich Tchaikovsky	
2018–2019	Smile performed by Barbra Streisand	Pas de Deux (from The Nutcracker) by Pyotr Ilyich Tchaikovsky	
2017–2018	La La Land; Planetarium by Justin Hurwitz; Another Day of Sun performed by La La Land cast	Arabia by Hanine El Alam	
2016–2017	Malagueña by Ernesto Lecuona choreo. by Tatiana Prokofieva	Swan Lake by Pyotr Illich Tchaikovsky choreo. by Tatiana Prokofieva; Romeo and Juliet by Nino Rota choreo. by Tatiana Prokofieva	
2015–2016	Sing, Sing, Sing by Louis Prima choreo. by Tatiana Prokofieva; Na Katere; Gramofon by Eugen Doga choreo. by Tatiana Prokofieva	Romeo and Juliet by Nino Rota	True Colors by Nyssina Swerissen
2014–2015	Swallows by Dmitry Malikov	Romeo and Juliet by Nino Rota	Swallows by Dmitry Malikov; Once Upon a December (from Anastasia) by David Newman vocals by Deana Carter
2013–2014	Swallows by Dmitry Malikov	Once Upon a December (from Anastasia) by David Newman	

== Competitive highlights ==
GP: Grand Prix; CS: Challenger Series; JGP: Junior Grand Prix

International
Event	14–15	15–16	16–17	17–18	18–19	19–20	20–21
GP Rostelecom Cup							5th
CS Warsaw Cup						3rd	
International: Junior
JGP Final			5th				
JGP Estonia			2nd				
JGP Russia			3rd				
Tallinn Trophy			2nd				
Triglav Trophy			1st				
International: Advanced novice
Denkova-Staviski		1st					
National
Russian Champ.			WD		17th	14th	6th
Russian Jr. Champ.	5th	4th	11th	11th			
Russian Cup, Kazan							5th
Russian Cup, Sochi							5th
Levels: J = Junior; TBD = Assigned; WD = Withdrew

== Detailed results ==
=== Senior level ===
2020–21 season
Date	Event	SP	FS	Total
26 February – 2 March 2021	2021 Russian Cup Final domestic competition	9; 65.58	10; 116.41	10; 181.99
23–27 December 2020	2020 Russian Championships	6; 73.26	9; 131.37	6; 204.63
20–22 November 2020	2020 Rostelecom Cup	5; 68.47	6; 123.05	5; 191.52
8–12 November 2020	2020 Cup of Russia Series, 4th Stage, Kazan domestic competition	5; 64.39	8; 125.66	5; 190.05
23–27 October 2020	2020 Cup of Russia Series, 3rd Stage, Sochi domestic competition	6; 64.97	6; 114.68	5; 179.65
2019–20 season
24–29 December 2019	2020 Russian Championships	13; 60.01	14; 114.65	14; 174.66
14–17 November 2019	2019 CS Warsaw Cup	3; 64.37	4; 121.65	3; 186.02
2018–19 season
Date	Event	SP	FS	Total
19–23 December 2018	2019 Russian Championships	15; 60.63	18; 111.60	17; 172.23

=== Junior level ===
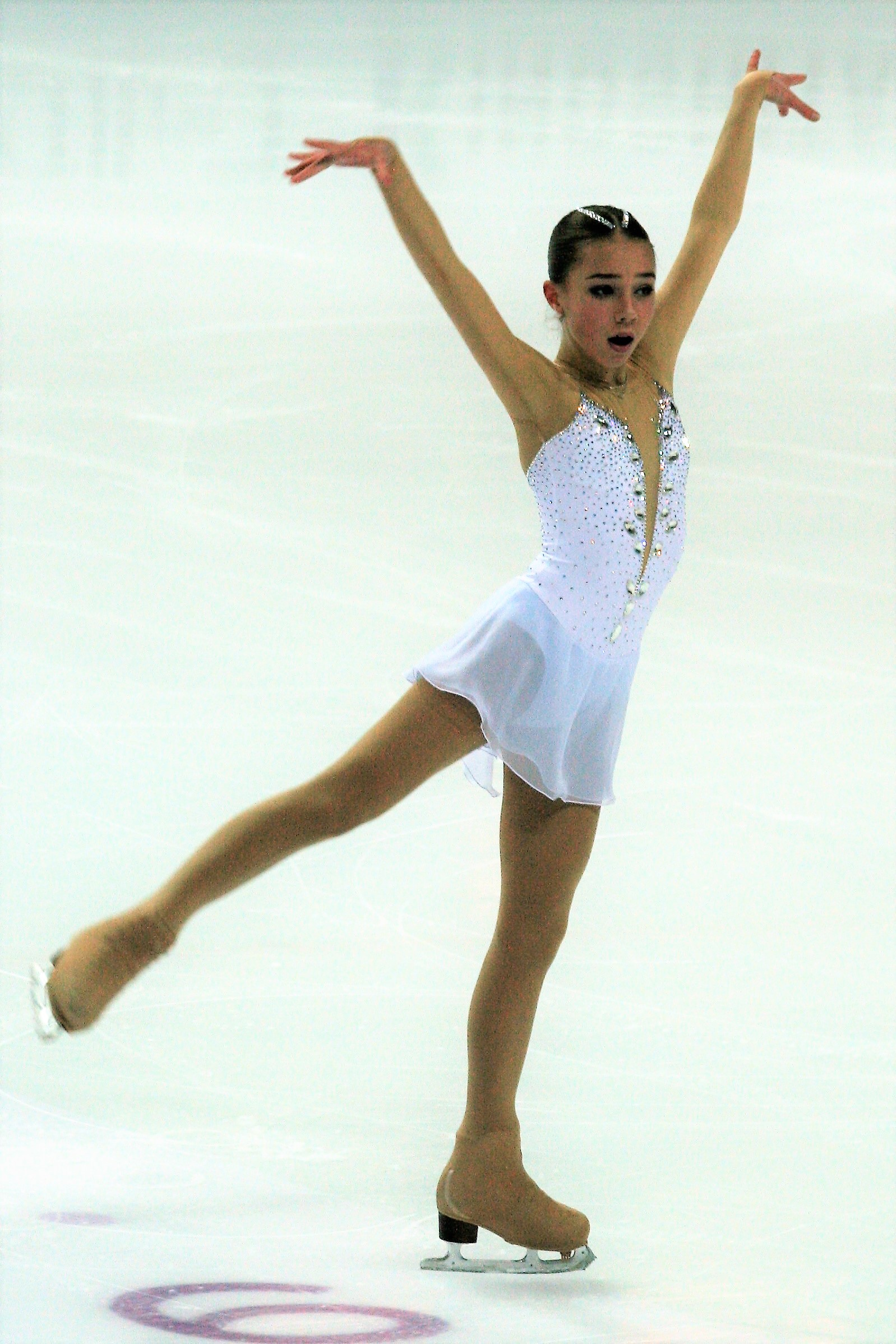
Nugumanova at the 2016−17 Junior Grand Prix Final free skating program

2017–18 season
Date	Event	Level	SP	FS	Total
23–26 January 2018	2018 Russian Junior Championships	Junior	11; 66.41	9; 125.24	11; 191.65
2016–17 season
Date	Event	Level	SP	FS	Total
5–9 April 2017	2017 Triglav Trophy	Junior	1; 65.86	1; 121.12	1; 186.98
1–5 February 2017	2017 Russian Junior Championships	Junior	13; 55.72	7; 123.11	11; 178.83
8–11 December 2016	2016−17 JGP Final	Junior	4; 58.34	5; 111.74	5; 170.08
20–27 November 2016	2016 Tallinn Trophy	Junior	2; 65.30	2; 122.92	2; 188.22
28 September – 2 October 2016	2016 JGP Estonia	Junior	3; 62.41	2; 126.02	2; 188.43
14–18 September 2016	2016 JGP Russia	Junior	4; 57.30	1; 115.83	3; 173.13
2015–16 season
Date	Event	Level	SP	FS	Total
21–23 January 2016	2016 Russian Junior Championships	Junior	4; 65.24	4; 120.12	4; 185.36
20–25 October 2015	2015 Denkova-Staviski Cup	Novice	1; 49.94	1; 80.85	1; 130.79
2014–15 season
Date	Event	Level	SP	FS	Total
4–7 February 2015	2015 Russian Junior Championships	Junior	5; 62.23	6; 116.22	5; 178.45
