= Tatiana Mishina =

Russian figure skater and coach

Personal information
- Full name: Tatiana Nikolaevna Mishina
- Other names: Tatiana Nikolaevna Oleneva
- Born: 16 June 1954 (age 72) Leningrad, Russian SFSR, Soviet Union

Figure skating career
- Country: Soviet Union

Tatiana Nikolaevna Mishina (Russian: Татьяна Николаевна Мишина), née: Oleneva (Оленева) (born 16 June 1954) is a Russian figure skating coach and former competitor for the Soviet. She is the 1973 Soviet national champion.

== Career ==
Mishina won bronze at the 1972 Prize of Moscow News. She then won the Soviet national title and was assigned to the 1973 European Championships where she finished 14th. Following her retirement from competition, she began coaching.

Mishina's current students include:

- Sofia Samodurova
- Evgeni Semenenko
- Anastasiia Guliakova

Her former students include:

- Natalia Ogoreltseva
- Maria Stavitskaia
- Artur Gachinski
- Ksenia Doronina
- Andrei Lutai (second coach)
- Elizaveta Nugumanova
- Andrei Zuber
- Alexander Petrov
- Andrei Lazukin
- Alisa Lozko

== Personal life ==
Oleneva married her former coach Alexei Mishin. They have two sons, both of whom play tennis.

== Results ==
International
Event	1971–72	1972–73	1973–74
European Championships		14th	
Prize of Moscow News		3rd	5th
National
Soviet Championships	2nd	1st	2nd
