= 2020 Rostelecom Cup =

International figure skating competition

- Type: Grand Prix
- Date: 20 – 22 November
- Season: 2020–21
- Location: Moscow, Russia
- Host: Figure Skating Federation of Russia
- Venue: Megasport Sport Palace

Champions
- Men's singles: (Russia) Mikhail Kolyada
- Women's singles: (Russia) Elizaveta Tuktamysheva
- Pairs: (Russia) Aleksandra Boikova and Dmitrii Kozlovskii
- Ice dance: (Russia) Victoria Sinitsina and Nikita Katsalapov
- Previous: 2019 Rostelecom Cup
- Next: 2021 Rostelecom Cup
- Previous Grand Prix: 2020 Cup of China
- Next Grand Prix: 2020 NHK Trophy

The 2020 Rostelecom Cup is a figure skating competition sanctioned by the International Skating Union (ISU). Organized and hosted by the Figure Skating Federation of Russia (Russian: Чемпионат России по фигурному катанию), it was the fifth event in the 2020–21 ISU Grand Prix of Figure Skating: a senior-level international invitational competition series. It was held from 20 to 22 November at the Megasport Sport Palace in Moscow, Russia. Medals were awarded in men's singles, women's singles, pair skating, and ice dance. Skaters earned points based on their results, and the top skaters or teams in each discipline were invited to then compete at the 2020–21 Grand Prix Final. All of the champions were from Russia: Mikhail Kolyada in the men's event, Elizaveta Tuktamysheva in the women's event, Aleksandra Boikova and Dmitrii Kozlovskii in the pairs event, and Victoria Sinitsina and Nikita Katsalapov in the ice dance event. This event led to controversy after an apparent COVID-19 spread among attendees, leading many to describe it as a superspreading event.

== Background ==
The ISU Grand Prix of Figure Skating is a series of seven events sanctioned by the International Skating Union (ISU) and held during the autumn: six qualifying events and the Grand Prix of Figure Skating Final. This allows skaters to perfect their programs earlier in the season, as well as compete against the skaters with whom they will later compete at the World Championships. Skaters earn points based on their results in their respective competitions and the top skaters or teams in each discipline are invited to compete at the Grand Prix Final.

Due to the ongoing COVID-19 pandemic, a number of modifications were made to the structure of the 2020 Rostelecom Cup. The competitors consisted only of skaters from Russia, skaters already training in Russia, or skaters assigned there for geographic reasons.

== Changes to preliminary assignments ==
The International Skating Union announced the preliminary assignments on 1 October 2020.

Discipline	Withdrew		Added		Notes	Ref.
Discipline	Date	Skater(s)	Date	Skater(s)	Notes	Ref.
Men	—N/a		9 October	(Belarus); Alexander Lebedev	—N/a	
Women	—N/a		9 October	(Armenia); Anastasia Galustyan	—N/a	
Pairs	—N/a		9 October	(Russia); Iuliia Artemeva; Mikhail Nazarychev	—N/a	
Pairs	9 October	(Israel); Anna Vernikov; Evgeni Krasnopolski	9 October	(Russia); Kseniia Akhanteva; Valerii Kolesov	—N/a	
Men	16 October	(Georgia (country)); Irakli Maysuradze	12 November	(Russia); Artem Kovalev	—N/a	
Ice dance	16 October	(Georgia (country)); Maria Kazakova; Georgy Reviya	28 October	(Lithuania); Allison Reed; Saulius Ambrulevičius	—N/a	
Women	—N/a		28 October	(Estonia); Eva-Lotta Kiibus	—N/a	
Ice dance	4 November	(Russia); Ksenia Konkina; Pavel Drozd	7 November	(Hungary); Anna Yanovskaya; Ádám Lukács	—N/a	
Men	12 November	(Russia); Artur Danielian	12 November	(Russia); Evgeni Semenenko	Recovery from surgery	
Pairs	12 November	(Russia); Daria Pavliuchenko; Denis Khodykin	13 November	(Russia); Yasmina Kadyrova; Ivan Balchenko	Respiratory infection (Khodykin)	
Women	16 November	(Russia); Evgenia Medvedeva	16 November	(Russia); Elizaveta Nugumanova	Recovery from injury	
Ice dance	16 November	(Russia); Sofia Shevchenko; Igor Eremenko	16 November	(Russia); Ekaterina Mironova; Evgenii Ustenko	—N/a	
Ice dance	16 November	(Russia); Alexandra Stepanova; Ivan Bukin	16 November	(Belarus); Viktoria Semenjuk; Ilya Yukhimuk	COVID-19	
Men	17 November	(Russia); Alexander Samarin	17 November	(Russia); Ilya Yablokov	Recovery from injury	
Pairs	18 November	(Russia); Alina Pepeleva; Roman Pleshkov	—N/a		COVID-19 (Philip Tarasov, coach)	

== Required performance elements ==
=== Single skating ===
Men and women competing in single skating performed their short programs on 20 November. Lasting no more than 2 minutes 40 seconds, the short program had to include the following elements:

For men: one double or triple Axel; one triple or quadruple jump; one jump combination consisting of a double jump and a triple jump, two triple jumps, or a quadruple jump and a double jump or triple jump; one flying spin; one camel spin or sit spin with a change of foot; one spin combination with a change of foot; and a step sequence using the full ice surface.

For women: one double or triple Axel; one triple jump; one jump combination consisting of a double jump and a triple jump, or two triple jumps; one flying spin; one layback spin or sideways leaning spin without a change of foot; one spin combination with a change of foot; and one step sequence using the full ice surface.

Men and women performed their free skates on 21 November. The free skate could last no more than 4 minutes, and had to include the following: seven jump elements, of which one had to be an Axel-type jump; three spins, of which one had to be a spin combination, one a flying spin, and one a spin with only one position; a step sequence; and a choreographic sequence.

=== Pairs ===
Couples competing in pair skating first performed their short programs on 20 November. Lasting no more than 2 minutes 40 seconds, the short program had to include the following elements: one pair lift, one double or triple twist lift, one double or triple throw jump, one double or triple solo jump, one solo spin combination with a change of foot, one death spiral, and a step sequence using the full ice surface.

Couples performed their free skates on 21 November. The free skate could last no more than 4 minutes, and had to include the following: three pair lifts, one twist lift, two different throw jumps, one solo jump, one jump combination or sequence, one pair spin combination, one death spiral, and a choreographic sequence.

=== Ice dance ===
Couples competing in ice dance performed their rhythm dances on 20 November. Lasting no more than 2 minutes 50 seconds, the required theme of the rhythm dance this season was music from musicals or operettas, utilizing any of the following rhythms: quickstep, blues, march, polka, foxtrot, swing, Charleston, or waltz. The required pattern dance element was the Finnstep. The rhythm dance had to include the following elements: one section of the Finnstep skated to either the quickstep, Charleston, or swing; one pattern dance type step sequence, one pattern dance in hold or not touching, one short lift, and one set of sequential twizzles.

Couples performed their free dances on 21 November. The free dance could last no longer than 4 minutes, and had to include the following: three short lifts or one short lift and one combination lift, one dance spin, one set of synchronized twizzles, one step sequence in hold, one step sequence while on one skate and not touching, and three choreographic elements.

== Judging ==
All of the technical elements in any figure skating performance – such as jumps, spins, and lifts – were assigned a predetermined base point value and then scored by a panel of nine judges on a scale from –3 to +3 based on their quality of execution. The judging panel's Grade of Execution (GOE) was determined by calculating the trimmed mean (the average after discarding the highest and lowest scores), and this GOE was added to the base value to come up with the final score for each element. The panel's scores for all elements were added together to generate a total elements score. At the same time, the judges evaluated each performance based on five program components – skating skills, transitions, performance, composition, and interpretation of the music/timing – and assigned a score from 0.25 to 10 in 0.25-point increments. The judging panel's final score for each program component was also determined by calculating the trimmed mean. Those scores were then multiplied by the factor shown on the following chart; the results were added together to generate a total program component score.

Program component factoring
Discipline	Short program or Rhythm dance	Free skate or Free dance
Men	1.00	2.00
Women	0.80	1.60
Pairs	0.80	1.60
Ice dance	0.80	1.20

Deductions were applied for certain violations like time infractions, stops and restarts, or falls. The total elements score and total program component score were added together, minus any deductions, to generate a final performance score for each skater or team.

== Medalists ==
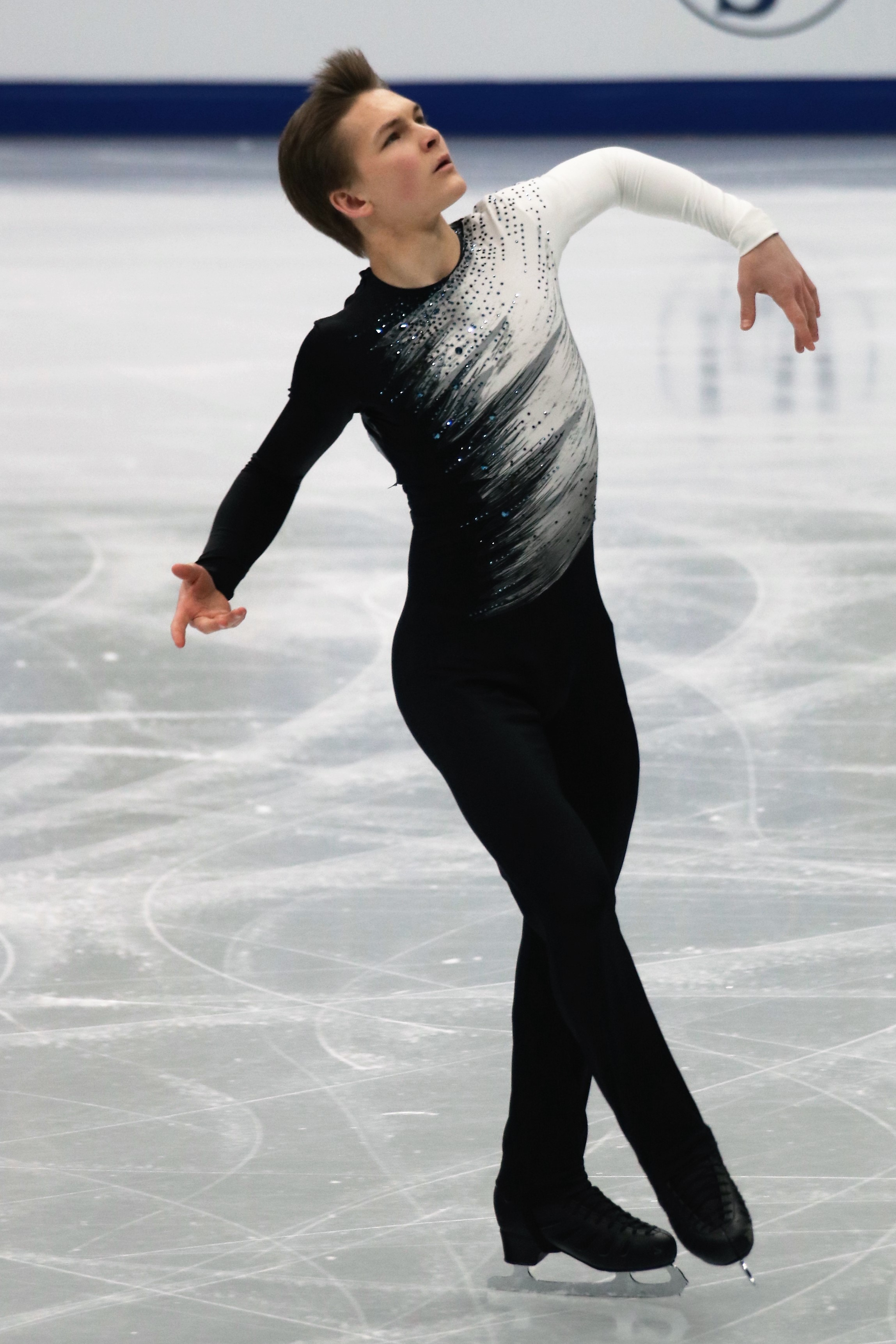
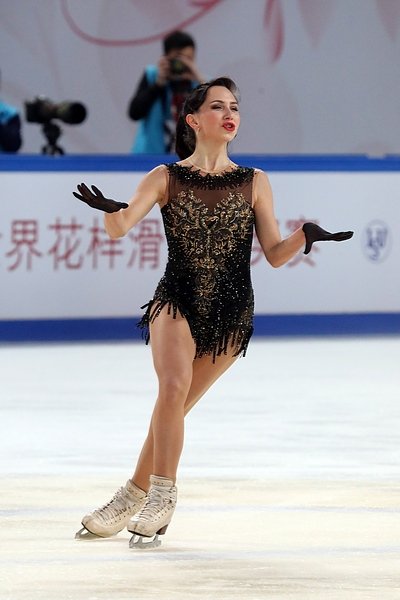
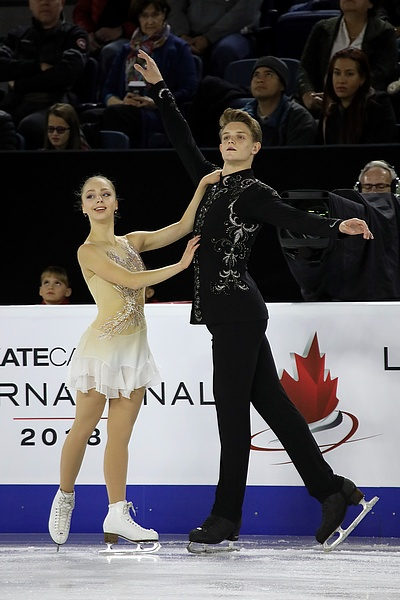
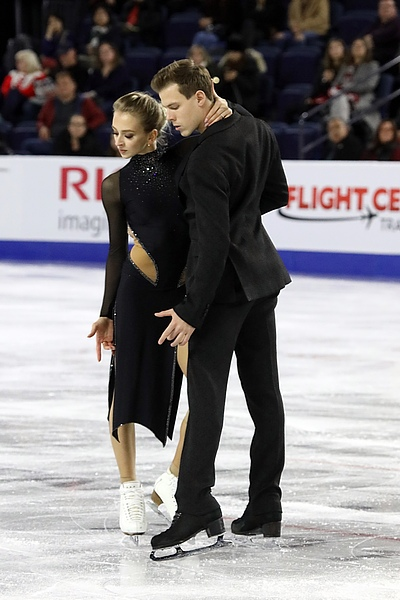
The 2020 Rostelecom Cup champions, all from Russia: Mikhail Kolyada (men's singles), Elizaveta Tuktamysheva (women's singles), Aleksandra Boikova and Dmitrii Kozlovskii (pair skating), and Victoria Sinitsina and Nikita Katsalapov (ice dance)

Medalists
Discipline	Gold	Silver	Bronze
Men	(Russia) Mikhail Kolyada	(Georgia (country)) Morisi Kvitelashvili	(Russia) Petr Gumennik
Women	(Russia) Elizaveta Tuktamysheva	(Russia) Alena Kostornaia	(Russia) Anastasiia Guliakova
Pairs	(Russia); Aleksandra Boikova; Dmitrii Kozlovskii	(Russia); Anastasia Mishina; Aleksandr Galliamov	(Russia); Apollinariia Panfilova; Dmitry Rylov
Ice dance	(Russia); Victoria Sinitsina; Nikita Katsalapov	(Russia); Tiffany Zahorski; Jonathan Guerreiro	(Russia); Anastasia Skoptsova; Kirill Aleshin

== Results ==
=== Men's singles ===
Men's results
Rank	Skater	Nation	Total points	SP		FS	
1st place, gold medalist(s)	Mikhail Kolyada	Russia	281.89	3	93.34	1	188.55
2nd place, silver medalist(s)	Morisi Kvitelashvili	Georgia	275.80	1	99.56	4	176.24
3rd place, bronze medalist(s)	Petr Gumennik	Russia	268.47	2	96.26	6	172.21
4	Andrei Mozalev	Russia	266.69	6	86.01	2	180.68
5	Dmitri Aliev	Russia	265.11	5	89.62	5	175.49
6	Evgeni Semenenko	Russia	260.78	7	83.42	3	177.36
7	Makar Ignatov	Russia	260.78	4	91.82	7	168.96
8	Roman Savosin	Russia	250.07	8	82.35	8	167.72
9	Ilya Yablokov	Russia	242.52	10	79.15	9	163.37
10	Vladimir Litvintsev	Azerbaijan	239.79	9	81.55	10	158.24
11	Artem Kovalev	Russia	212.50	11	77.67	11	134.83
12	Alexander Lebedev	Belarus	182.30	12	62.88	12	119.42

=== Women's singles ===
Anna Shcherbakova of Russia withdrew from the competition prior to the short program due to illness.

Women's results
Rank	Skater	Nation	Total points	SP		FS	
1st place, gold medalist(s)	Elizaveta Tuktamysheva	Russia	223.39	2	74.70	1	148.69
2nd place, silver medalist(s)	Alena Kostornaia	Russia	220.78	1	78.84	2	141.94
3rd place, bronze medalist(s)	Anastasiia Guliakova	Russia	199.03	4	70.07	3	128.96
4	Alexandra Trusova	Russia	198.93	3	70.81	4	128.12
5	Elizaveta Nugumanova	Russia	191.52	5	68.47	6	123.05
6	Eva-Lotta Kiibus	Estonia	186.00	9	57.88	5	128.12
7	Sofia Samodurova	Russia	184.81	6	68.01	8	116.80
8	Viktoriia Safonova	Belarus	184.57	7	64.25	7	120.32
9	Ekaterina Ryabova	Azerbaijan	167.85	8	58.58	9	109.27
10	Alina Urushadze	Georgia	150.68	10	55.86	10	94.82
WD	Anastasia Galustyan	Armenia	Withdrew	11	52.06	Withdrew from competition	
WD	Anna Shcherbakova	Russia	Withdrew from competition				

=== Pairs ===
Pairs results
Rank	Skater	Nation	Total points	SP		FS	
1st place, gold medalist(s)	Aleksandra Boikova; Dmitrii Kozlovskii	Russia	232.56	2	78.29	1	154.27
2nd place, silver medalist(s)	Anastasia Mishina; Aleksandr Galliamov	Russia	225.80	1	79.34	2	146.46
3rd place, bronze medalist(s)	Apollinariia Panfilova; Dmitry Rylov	Russia	210.07	3	73.84	3	136.23
4	Yasmina Kadyrova; Ivan Balchenko	Russia	204.87	4	70.62	4	134.05
5	Iuliia Artemeva; Mikhail Nazarychev	Russia	200.77	5	70.11	5	130.66
6	Kseniia Akhanteva; Valerii Kolesov	Russia	176.63	6	67.50	6	109.13
7	Ioulia Chtchetinina; Márk Magyar	Hungary	163.77	7	58.60	7	105.17

=== Ice dance ===
Ice dance results
Rank	Team	Nation	Total points	RD		FD	
1st place, gold medalist(s)	Victoria Sinitsina; Nikita Katsalapov	Russia	217.51	1	91.13	1	126.38
2nd place, silver medalist(s)	Tiffany Zahorski; Jonathan Guerreiro	Russia	206.91	2	84.46	2	122.45
3rd place, bronze medalist(s)	Anastasia Skoptsova; Kirill Aleshin	Russia	199.25	3	79.75	3	119.50
4	Elizaveta Khudaiberdieva; Egor Bazin	Russia	193.18	5	76.10	4	117.08
5	Annabelle Morozov; Andrei Bagin	Russia	191.00	4	76.21	5	114.79
6	Oleksandra Nazarova; Maxim Nikitin	Ukraine	188.25	6	74.86	6	113.39
7	Allison Reed; Saulius Ambrulevičius	Lithuania	182.56	7	72.43	7	110.13
8	Anna Yanovskaya; Ádám Lukács	Hungary	163.65	8	61.34	8	102.31
9	Ekaterina Mironova; Evgenii Ustenko	Russia	152.14	9	56.47	9	95.67
10	Viktoria Semenjuk; Ilya Yukhimuk	Belarus	146.38	10	56.22	10	90.16

== COVID-19 spread and controversy ==
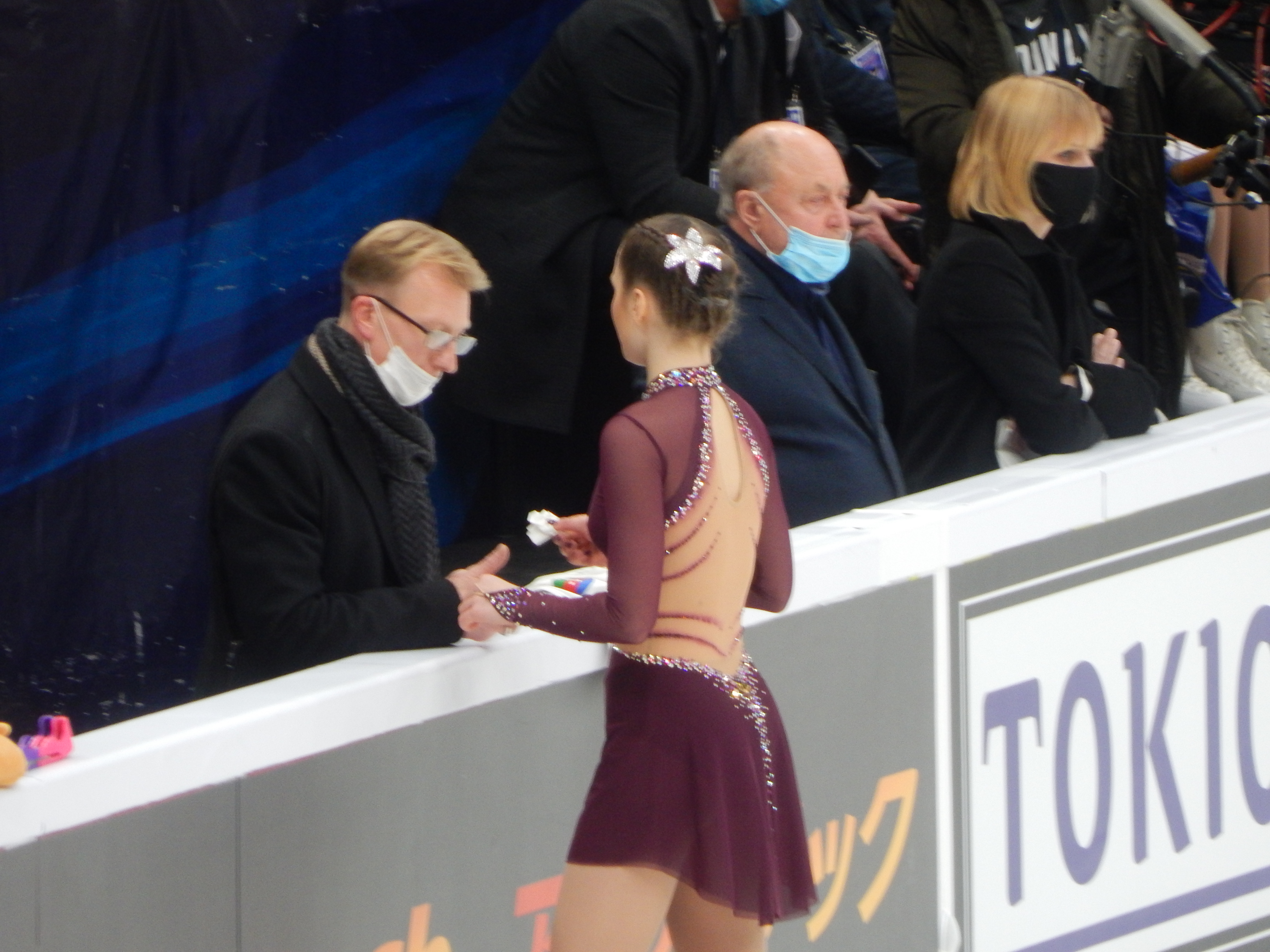
Coaches Alexander Volkov (left) and Alexei Mishin (center)

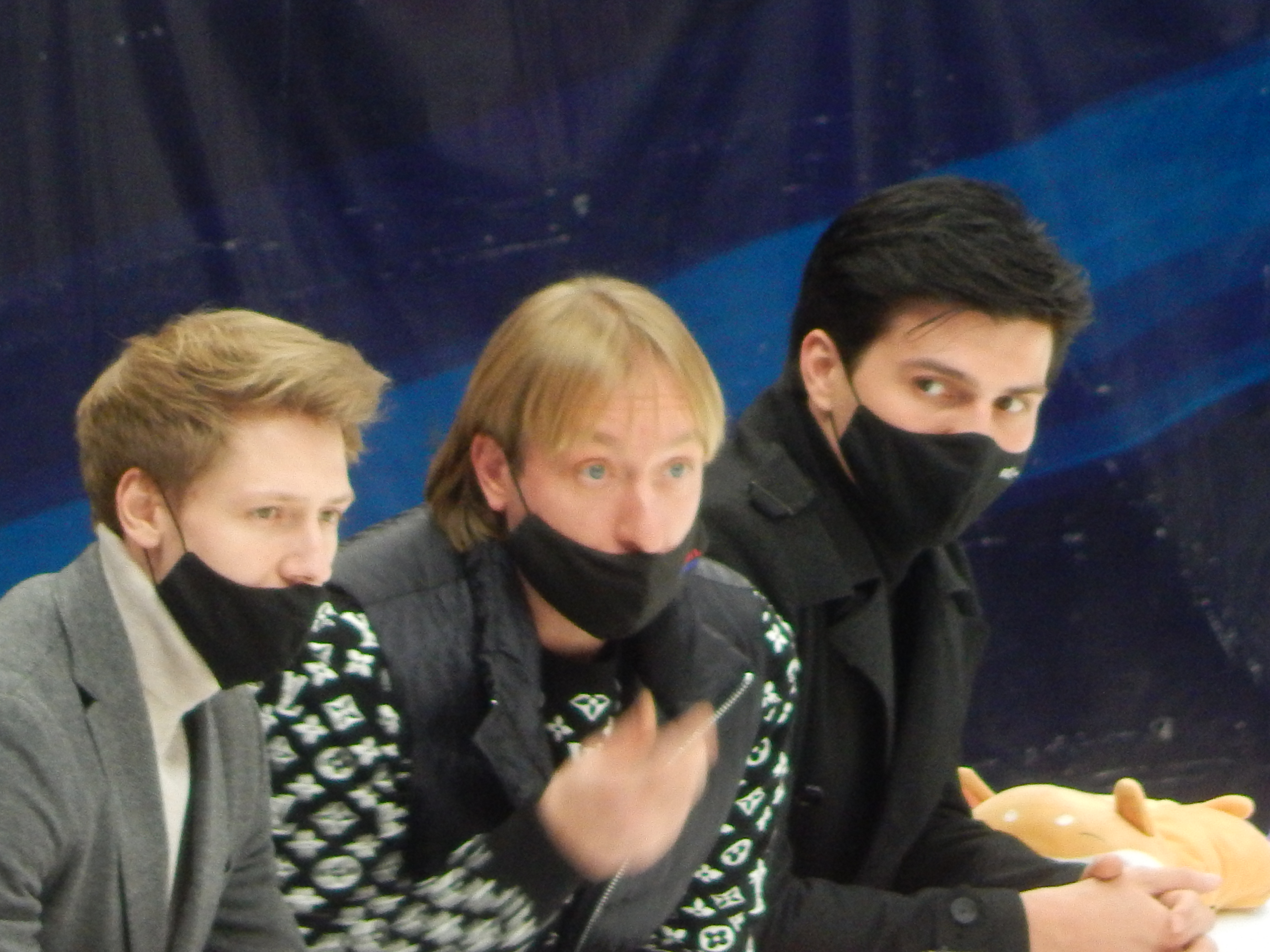
Coaches Dmitri Mikhailov (left) and Evgeni Plushenko (center)

The 2020 Rostelecom Cup became controversial after an apparent COVID-19 spread among attendees. Despite some precautionary measures being taken, the organizers of the Rostelecom Cup, as with many other Russian domestic competitions during the season, came under criticism for allowing a large audience and an insufficient enforcement of mandates regarding social distancing and proper mask usage. A focal point of criticism was the decision to hold the traditional post-competition banquet where many skaters were documented not socially distancing at all, as well as sharing food from a communal buffet. Several Russian skaters who competed at the event reported contracting the virus in the weeks afterward, including Dmitri Aliev, Alena Kostornaia, Elizaveta Tuktamysheva, Victoria Sinitsina, and Nikita Katsalapov. Estonian skater Eva-Lotta Kiibus also reported contracting COVID-19 at the event and was still suffering effects two months later.

Irina Rodnina, three-time Olympic champion for Russia in pair skating and member of the State Duma, strongly criticized the handling of the Rostelecom Cup and cited it as an example of the government needing to more aggressively fine people for non-compliance. After the event, when questioned by a journalist as to whether the Figure Skating Federation of Russia would be sanctioned over their disregard for safety protocols, Jan Dijkema, then-president of the ISU, acknowledged "the regrettable news about the situation involving positive test results for COVID-19," but denied that the ISU would take responsibility, citing the semi-domestic nature of the 2020–21 Grand Prix series.

== Works cited ==
- "Special Regulations & Technical Rules – Single & Pair Skating and Ice Dance 2018". International Skating Union. Archived from the original on 17 August 2020.
