= 2021 Russian Figure Skating Championships =

- Type: National championship
- Date: 23–27 December 2020 (S); 1–5 February 2021 (J)
- Season: 2020–21
- Location: Chelyabinsk (S); Krasnoyarsk (J)
- Host: Figure Skating Federation of Russia
- Venue: Traktor Ice Arena (S); Crystal Ice Arena (J)

Champions
- Men's singles: Mikhail Kolyada (S); Evgeni Semenenko (J)
- Ladies' singles: Anna Shcherbakova (S); Sofia Akateva (J)
- Pairs: Evgenia Tarasova / Vladimir Morozov (S); Iuliia Artemeva / Mikhail Nazarychev (J)
- Ice dance: Alexandra Stepanova / Ivan Bukin (S); Arina Ushakova / Maxim Nekrasov (J)
- Previous: 2020 Russian Championships
- Next: 2022 Russian Championships

The 2021 Russian Figure Skating Championships (Russian: Чемпионат России по фигурному катанию на коньках 2021) were held from 23 to 27 December 2020 in Chelyabinsk. Medals were awarded in the disciplines of men's singles, ladies' singles, pair skating, and ice dance. The results were among the criteria used to select the Russian team for the 2021 World Championships.

== Qualifying ==
During the 2020–21 season, Russian skaters competed in domestic qualifying events for national championships at various age levels. The Russian Cup series will lead to three events – the Russian Championships, the Russian Junior Championships, and the Russian Cup Final.

Due to the COVID-19 pandemic, there were limited international competitive opportunities and all skaters were required to qualify through the Russian Cup series. The Figure Skating Federation of Russia initially did not award exemptions for injury, illness, or skaters who trained abroad. On 16 November, FFKKR president Alexander Gorshkov announced a review of the qualification process after several national team members were unable to meet the two event qualification requirement.

Date	Event	Type	Location	Results
18–22 September 2020	Russian Cup – Stage I	Qualifier	Syzran, Samara Oblast	Details
10–13 October 2020	Russian Cup – Stage II	Qualifier	Moscow	Details
23–27 October 2020	Russian Cup – Stage III	Qualifier	Sochi, Krasnodar Krai	Details
8–12 November 2020	Russian Cup – Stage IV	Qualifier	Kazan, Tatarstan	Details
5–8 December 2020	Russian Cup – Stage V	Qualifier	Moscow	Details
23–27 December 2020	Russian Championships	Final	Chelyabinsk, Chelyabinsk Oblast	Details
1–5 February 2021	Russian Junior Championships	Final	Krasnoyarsk, Krasnoyarsk Krai	Details
26 February – 2 March 2021	Russian Cup Final	Final	Moscow	Details
10–14 March 2021	Russian Youth Championships – Younger Age	Final	Saransk, Mordovia	Details
1–5 April 2021	Russian Youth Championships – Elder Age	Final	Sochi, Krasnodar Krai	Details

=== Controversy ===
In December 2020, the Russian Federation drew criticism for its decision to host several competitions with an audience present, despite the worsening COVID-19 pandemic in Russia and the increasing number of its national team members who tested positive for COVID-19. Several skaters, including reigning European and national champions Dmitri Aliev and Victoria Sinitsina / Nikita Katsalapov, as well as reigning European champion Alena Kostornaia, withdrew from the Russian Cup series and/or Championships due to contracting the virus.

== Medals summary ==
Senior Championships
Discipline	Gold	Silver	Bronze
Men	Mikhail Kolyada	Makar Ignatov	Mark Kondratiuk
Ladies	Anna Shcherbakova	Kamila Valieva	Alexandra Trusova
Pairs	Evgenia Tarasova / Vladimir Morozov	Aleksandra Boikova / Dmitrii Kozlovskii	Daria Pavliuchenko / Denis Khodykin
Ice dance	Alexandra Stepanova / Ivan Bukin	Tiffany Zahorski / Jonathan Guerreiro	Anastasia Skoptsova / Kirill Aleshin
Junior Championships
Discipline	Gold	Silver	Bronze
Men	Evgeni Semenenko	Aleksandr Golubev	Egor Rukhin
Ladies	Sofia Akateva	Adeliia Petrosian	Sofia Muravieva
Pairs	Iuliia Artemeva / Mikhail Nazarychev	Kseniia Akhanteva / Valerii Kolesov	Anastasia Mukhortova / Dmitry Evgenyev
Ice dance	Arina Ushakova / Maxim Nekrasov	Elizaveta Shanaeva / Devid Naryzhnyy	Irina Khavronina / Dario Cirisano
Russian Cup Final
Discipline	Gold	Silver	Bronze
Men	Evgeni Semenenko	Petr Gumennik	Dmitri Aliev
Ladies	Kamila Valieva	Maya Khromykh	Daria Usacheva
Pairs	Anastasia Mishina / Aleksandr Galliamov	Daria Pavliuchenko / Denis Khodykin	Yasmina Kadyrova / Ivan Balchenko
Ice dance	Victoria Sinitsina / Nikita Katsalapov	Annabelle Morozov / Andrei Bagin	Ekaterina Mironova / Evgenii Ustenko
Junior men	Vladislav Dikidzhi	Andrei Kutovoi	Nikolai Ugozhaev
Junior ladies	Sofia Akateva	Sofia Samodelkina	Adeliia Petrosian
Junior pairs	Ekaterina Petushkova / Evgenii Malikov	Anastasia Mukhortova / Dmitry Evgenyev	Polina Kostiukovich / Aleksei Briukhanov
Junior ice dance	Diana Davis / Gleb Smolkin	Vasilisa Kaganovskaia / Valeriy Angelopol	Angelina Lazareva / Maksim Prokofiev
Youth Championships – Elder Age
Discipline	Gold	Silver	Bronze
Men	Andrei Anisimov	Semyon Soloviev	Nikolay Kolesnikov
Ladies	Elizaveta Osokina	Alina Gorbacheva	Daria Sadkova
Pairs	Alina Raskovalova / Artyom Butaev	Ekaterina Storublevtseva / Artem Gritsaenko	Ekaterina Chikmareva / Matvei Ianchenkov
Ice dance	Sofia Leonteva / Daniil Gorelkin	Olga Mamchenkova / Mark Volkov	Anna Rumak / Gleb Goncharov
Youth Championships – Younger Age
Discipline	Gold	Silver	Bronze
Men	Nikolay Kolesnikov	Lev Lazarev	Arseny Fedotov
Ladies	Alisa Dvoeglazova	Sofya Titova	Elizaveta Kulikova
Pairs	No pairs' discipline		
Ice dancing	No ice dancing discipline		

== Senior Championships ==
The 2021 Russian Championships were held in Chelyabinsk, Chelyabinsk Oblast from 23 to 27 December 2020.

There were two separate bases for qualification:

1. Qualification based on inclusion in official pre-season national team roster.
2. Qualification based on Russian Cup series' results.

=== Schedule ===
Listed in local time (UTC+05:00).

Day	Date	Start	Finish	Discipline	Event
Day 1	24 December	14:00	16:30	Men	Short program
Day 1	24 December	16:50	18:55	Ice dance	Rhythm dance
Day 1	24 December	19:15	19:45		Opening ceremony
Day 1	24 December	20:00	21:45	Pairs	Short program
Day 2	25 December	13:30	15:55	Ice dance	Free dance
Day 2	25 December	16:15	19:00	Men	Free skating
Day 2	25 December	19:20	21:45	Ladies	Short program
Day 3	26 December	16:30	18:40	Pairs	Free skating
Day 3	26 December	19:00	21:45	Ladies	Free skating
Day 4	27 December	13:00	13:45		Victory ceremonies
Day 4	27 December	14:00	16:30		Exhibition gala

=== Preliminary entries ===
The Figure Skating Federation of Russia published the official list of participants on 9 December 2020.

Men	Ladies	Pairs	Ice dance
~~Dmitri Aliev~~ (withdrew)	~~Alena Kostornaia~~ (withdrew)	Aleksandra Boikova / Dmitrii Kozlovskii	~~Victoria Sinitsina / Nikita Katsalapov~~ (withdrew)
~~Artur Danielian~~ (withdrew)	Anna Shcherbakova	Evgenia Tarasova / Vladimir Morozov	Alexandra Stepanova / Ivan Bukin
Alexander Samarin	Alexandra Trusova	Daria Pavliuchenko / Denis Khodykin	Tiffany Zahorski / Jonathan Guerreiro
Makar Ignatov	Elizaveta Tuktamysheva	Anastasia Mishina / Aleksandr Galliamov	Annabelle Morozov / Andrei Bagin
Andrei Mozalev	~~Evgenia Medvedeva~~ (withdrew)	Alina Pepeleva / Roman Pleshkov	Anastasia Skoptsova / Kirill Aleshin
Petr Gumennik	~~Alina Zagitova~~ (withdrew)	Apollinariia Panfilova / Dmitry Rylov	Sofia Shevchenko / Igor Eremenko
Anton Shulepov	~~Kseniia Sinitsyna~~ (withdrew)	Yasmina Kadyrova / Ivan Balchenko	~~Ksenia Konkina / Pavel Drozd~~ (withdrew)
~~Roman Savosin~~ (withdrew)	Anastasiia Guliakova	Iuliia Artemeva / Mikhail Nazarychev	~~Anastasia Shpilevaya / Grigory Smirnov~~ (withdrew)
Mikhail Kolyada	Sofia Samodurova	~~Kseniia Akhanteva / Valerii Kolesov~~ (withdrew)	Elizaveta Khudaiberdieva / Egor Bazin
Artem Kovalev	Kamila Valieva	Anastasia Balabanova / Alexei Sviatchenko	Svetlana Lizunova / Alexander Vakhnov
Evgeni Semenenko	Daria Usacheva	Diana Mukhametzianova / Ilya Mironov	Julia Tultseva / Anatoliy Belovodchenko
Egor Rukhin	Anna Frolova	Karina Akopova / Nikita Rakhmanin	Ekaterina Mironova / Evgenii Ustenko
Ilya Yablokov	Maya Khromykh		Sofia Kartashova / Ilya Karpov
~~Alexey Erokhov~~ (withdrew)	Ksenia Tsibinova		Vlada Pavlenina / Aleksandr Aleksanyan
Artem Lezheev	Anastasia Tarakanova		Elizaveta Kirillova / Mark Chegodaev
Maxim Varakin	Elizaveta Nugumanova		
Vladislav Katichev	Maria Talalaikina		
Artem Zotov	~~Valeria Shulskaya~~ (withdrew)		
Substitutes
Mark Kondratiuk (added)	Stanislava Molchanova (added)	Maria Alkhova / Sergey Bezborodko	Vlada Chashnikova / Zakhar Cherezov (added)
Egor Murashov (added)	Valeria Kostina (added)	Viktoria Vasilieva / Nikita Volodin	Elizaveta Pasechnik / Egor Kolosovskii (added)
Maxim Petrov (added)	Stanislava Konstantinova (added)		Alexandra Trukhina / Ivan Kapustin
Daniil Murzin	Arina Onishchenko (added)		
	Kamila Sultanmagomedova		

==== Changes to preliminary entries ====
Date	Discipline	Withdrew	Added	Reason/Other notes	Refs
16 September; 6 December	Ice dance	Anastasia Shpilevaya / Grigory Smirnov	Vlada Chashnikova / Zakhar Cherezov	Split	
19 October; 6 December	Ladies	Alina Zagitova	Stanislava Molchanova	Temporary break from competitions	
9 December	Men	Artur Danielian	Mark Kondratiuk	Recovery from ankle surgery	
9 December	Ladies	Evgenia Medvedeva	Valeria Kostina	Recovery from back injury and severe lung damage	
9 December	Ladies	Kseniia Sinitsyna	Stanislava Konstantinova	Recovery from leg injury and sickness	
9 December	Ice dance	Ksenia Konkina / Pavel Drozd	Elizaveta Pasechnik / Egor Kolosovskii		
17 December	Men	Roman Savosin	Egor Murashov	COVID-19	
17 December	Men	Alexey Erokhov	Maxim Petrov	Recovery from legs' injuries and rotavirus	
17 December	Pairs	Kseniia Akhanteva / Valerii Kolesov	None	Injury (Kolesov)	
17 December	Ice dance	Victoria Sinitsina / Nikita Katsalapov	None	Recovery from COVID-19	
20 December	Men	Dmitri Aliev	None	Recovery from COVID-19	
22 December	Ladies	Alena Kostornaia	Arina Onishchenko	Recovery from COVID-19	
22 December	Ladies	Valeria Shulskaya	None	COVID-19	

=== Results ===
==== Men ====
Rank	Name	Total points	SP		FS	
1	Mikhail Kolyada	296.15	1	102.48	1	193.67
2	Makar Ignatov	265.37	2	98.30	3	167.07
3	Mark Kondratiuk	260.31	3	90.88	2	169.43
4	Andrei Mozalev	252.92	4	89.47	5	163.45
5	Alexander Samarin	251.38	5	87.96	6	163.42
6	Anton Shulepov	249.89	9	83.19	4	166.70
7	Petr Gumennik	247.47	8	84.93	7	162.54
8	Artem Kovalev	247.17	6	87.45	9	159.72
9	Egor Rukhin	240.17	12	78.99	8	161.18
10	Artem Lezheev	232.98	10	82.36	11	150.62
11	Evgeni Semenenko	228.47	11	79.86	12	148.61
12	Artem Zotov	227.66	14	74.39	10	153.27
13	Egor Murashov	226.14	7	86.13	13	140.01
14	Ilya Yablokov	214.15	13	77.38	14	136.77
15	Maxim Varakin	180.01	16	57.71	15	122.30
16	Vladislav Katichev	177.06	15	66.86	16	110.20
17	Maxim Petrov	158.76	17	52.86	17	105.90

==== Ladies ====
Rank	Name	Total points	SP		FS	
1	Anna Shcherbakova	264.10	1	80.31	1	183.79
2	Kamila Valieva	254.01	2	79.99	2	174.02
3	Alexandra Trusova	246.37	4	75.76	3	170.61
4	Daria Usacheva	230.56	3	76.72	4	153.84
5	Maya Khromykh	211.91	7	72.93	5	138.98
6	Elizaveta Nugumanova	204.63	6	73.26	9	131.37
7	Elizaveta Tuktamysheva	204.25	5	73.56	10	130.69
8	Ksenia Tsibinova	203.56	9	68.84	6	134.72
9	Maria Talalaikina	197.32	11	63.89	7	133.43
10	Sofia Samodurova	196.28	10	67.70	11	128.58
11	Anna Frolova	187.13	16	53.70	8	133.43
12	Anastasiia Guliakova	185.75	8	70.24	14	115.51
13	Stanislava Molchanova	184.64	12	61.98	12	122.66
14	Anastasia Tarakanova	175.58	15	55.98	13	119.60
15	Arina Onishchenko	169.17	14	56.34	15	112.83
16	Stanislava Konstantinova	168.33	13	61.55	17	106.78
17	Valeria Kostina	161.43	17	50.67	16	110.76

==== Pairs ====
Rank	Name	Total points	SP		FS	
1	Evgenia Tarasova / Vladimir Morozov	228.23	1	80.65	1	147.58
2	Aleksandra Boikova / Dmitrii Kozlovskii	224.99	2	77.48	2	147.51
3	Daria Pavliuchenko / Denis Khodykin	221.39	3	77.01	3	144.38
4	Anastasia Mishina / Aleksandr Galliamov	211.95	5	73.25	4	138.70
5	Apollinariia Panfilova / Dmitry Rylov	207.03	4	74.51	5	132.52
6	Yasmina Kadyrova / Ivan Balchenko	196.04	6	68.69	7	127.35
7	Karina Akopova / Nikita Rakhmanin	194.77	8	65.44	6	129.33
8	Iuliia Artemeva / Mikhail Nazarychev	189.76	9	63.69	8	126.07
9	Alina Pepeleva / Roman Pleshkov	189.64	7	65.45	10	124.19
10	Anastasia Balabanova / Alexei Sviatchenko	188.91	10	63.56	9	125.35
11	Diana Mukhametzianova / Ilya Mironov	173.20	11	60.96	11	112.24

==== Ice dance ====
Rank	Name	Total points	RD		FD	
1	Alexandra Stepanova / Ivan Bukin	220.16	1	87.28	1	132.88
2	Tiffany Zahorski / Jonathan Guerreiro	210.94	2	84.02	2	126.92
3	Anastasia Skoptsova / Kirill Aleshin	196.97	3	80.19	4	116.78
4	Sofia Shevchenko / Igor Eremenko	194.29	5	77.83	5	116.46
5	Elizaveta Khudaiberdieva / Egor Bazin	192.68	4	78.01	6	114.67
6	Annabelle Morozov / Andrei Bagin	182.86	7	62.17	3	120.69
7	Svetlana Lizunova / Alexander Vakhnov	165.48	6	64.50	7	100.98
8	Ekaterina Mironova / Evgenii Ustenko	160.71	8	62.08	8	98.63
9	Sofia Kartashova / Ilya Karpov	153.01	9	60.31	10	92.70
10	Vlada Pavlenina / Aleksandr Aleksanyan	152.44	10	59.19	9	93.25
11	Julia Tultseva / Anatoliy Belovodchenko	143.03	11	58.34	11	84.69
12	Elizaveta Kirillova / Mark Chegodaev	124.50	13	46.53	12	77.97
13	Elizaveta Pasechnik / Egor Kolosovskii	123.64	12	48.82	14	74.82
14	Vlada Chashnikova / Zakhar Cherezov	115.96	14	41.09	13	74.87

== Junior Championships ==
The 2021 Russian Junior Championships (Russian: Первенство России среди юниоров 2021) will be held in Krasnoyarsk, Krasnoyarsk Krai from 1 to 5 February 2021. Competitors qualified through the Russian Cup series' junior-level events. The competition would have been part of the selection criteria for the cancelled 2021 World Junior Championships.

There were three separate bases for qualification:

1. Qualification based on inclusion in official pre-season national junior team roster.
2. Qualification based on competing at the 2021 Russian Senior Championships.
3. Qualification based on Russian Cup series' junior-level results.

=== Schedule ===
Listed in local time (UTC+07:00).

Day	Date	Start	Finish	Discipline	Event
Day 1	3 February	14:00	16:30	Men	Short program
Day 1	3 February	16:45	17:15		Opening ceremony
Day 1	3 February	17:30	20:00	Ladies	Short program
Day 1	3 February	20:15	22:25	Ice dance	Rhythm dance
Day 2	4 February	14:00	16:45	Men	Free skating
Day 2	4 February	17:00	18:45	Pairs	Short program
Day 2	4 February	19:00	21:45	Ladies	Free skating
Day 2	4 February	22:00	22:30		Victory ceremonies
Day 3	5 February	12:30	14:50	Ice dance	Free dance
Day 3	5 February	15:05	17:05	Pairs	Free skating
Day 3	5 February	17:30	18:00		Victory ceremonies

=== Entries ===
The Figure Skating Federation of Russia published the official list of participants on 26 January 2021.

Men	Ladies	Pairs	Ice dance
Andrei Anisimov	Sofia Akateva	Kseniia Akhanteva / Valerii Kolesov	Sofia Aleksova / Ilya Vladimirov
Maxim Avtushenko	Elizaveta Berestovskaia	Iuliia Artemeva / Mikhail Nazarychev	Ekaterina Andreeva / Ivan Desyatov
Maxim Belyavsky	Maria Dmitrieva	Daria Boyarintseva / Maxim Shagalov	Sofia Kachushkina / Oleg Muratov
Aleksandr Golubev	Anna Frolova	Alexandra Kargulina / Ilya Kalashnikov	Vasilisa Kaganovskaia / Valeriy Angelopol
Vladislav Dikidzhi	Valeria Kostina	Natalia Khabibullina / Ilya Knyazhuk	Irina Khavronina / Dario Cirisano
Vsevolod Knyazev	Natalia Lagutova	Polina Kostiukovich / Aleksei Briukhanov	Angelina Lazareva / Maxim Prokofiev
Artem Kovalev	Agneta Latushkina	Tatyana Kuzmina / Alexei Khvalko	Sofia Leonteva / Daniil Gorelkin
Andrei Kutovoi	Stanislava Molchanova	Anastasia Mukhortova / Dmitry Evgenyev	Taisiia Linchevskaia / Timur Babaev-Smirnov
Mark Lukin	Anastasia Morozova	Ekaterina Petushkova / Evgenii Malikov	Olga Mamchenkova / Mark Volkov
Ivan Popov	Sofia Muravieva	Alina Raskovalova / Artyom Butaev	Anna Rumak / Gleb Goncharov
Egor Rukhin	Elizaveta Osokina	Karina Safina / Sergei Bakhmat	Ekaterina Rybakova / Ivan Makhnonosov
Daniil Samsonov	Valeria Ovchinnikova	Ekaterina Storublevtseva / Artem Gritsaenko	Elizaveta Shanaeva / Devid Naryzhnyy
Kirill Sarnovskiy	Maria Paramonova		Elizaveta Shichina / Gordey Khubulov
Evgeni Semenenko	Adeliia Petrosian		Margarita Svistunova / Dmitrii Studenikin
Semyon Soloviev	Sofia Samodelkina		Arina Ushakova / Maxim Nekrasov
Nikolai Ugozhaev	Polina Sviridenko		
Ilya Yablokov	Ksenia Tsibinova		
Fedor Zonov	Veronika Zhilina		
Substitutes

==== Changes to preliminary entries ====
The competition would have been part of the selection criteria for the 2021 World Junior Championships. However, due to the COVID-19 pandemic, the International Skating Union cancelled the majority of all international junior competitions, including the 2020–21 ISU Junior Grand Prix and the World Junior Championships. As a result, several prominent juniors, such as reigning World and Russian Junior champion Kamila Valieva and World Junior silver medalist Daria Usacheva, decided to forgo the Russian Junior Championships (as well as other national junior-level competitions) and to focus solely on domestic senior-level competitions instead.

Some skaters who qualified to the 2021 Russian Junior Championships based on Russian Cup series' junior-level results were forced to withdraw from the tournament due to health issues (injury or sickness) – namely single skaters Matvei Vetlugin and Mariia Zakharova as well as ice dancers Sofya Tyutyunina / Alexander Shustitskiy.

=== Results ===
==== Men ====
Rank	Name	Total	SP		FS	
1	Evgeni Semenenko	247.37	1	87.13	1	160.24
2	Aleksandr Golubev	236.58	6	80.18	2	156.40
3	Egor Rukhin	235.71	5	81.01	3	154.70
4	Ilya Yablokov	234.24	2	85.38	6	148.86
5	Nikolai Ugozhaev	228.41	8	76.27	5	152.14
6	Vladislav Dikidzhi	228.02	11	74.13	4	153.89
7	Daniil Samsonov	226.20	4	83.40	9	142.80
8	Kirill Sarnovskiy	225.02	7	78.68	7	146.34
9	Artem Kovalev	223.27	3	85.01	13	138.26
10	Andrei Kutovoi	217.07	9	75.83	10	141.24
11	Maxim Belyavsky	215.56	10	74.76	11	140.80
12	Andrei Anisimov	213.66	17	67.41	8	146.25
13	Vsevolod Knyazev	211.53	13	72.29	12	139.24
14	Ivan Popov	201.32	14	70.66	14	130.66
15	Fedor Zonov	199.49	16	68.95	15	130.54
16	Mark Lukin	196.86	12	73.71	17	123.15
17	Maxim Avtushenko	190.35	15	69.02	18	121.33
18	Semyon Soloviev	187.98	18	62.73	16	125.25

==== Ladies ====
Rank	Name	Total	SP		FS	
1	Sofia Akateva	220.00	2	72.80	1	147.20
2	Adeliia Petrosian	211.87	3	72.64	2	139.23
3	Sofia Muravieva	208.13	1	72.97	4	135.16
4	Sofia Samodelkina	207.64	4	71.37	3	136.27
5	Elizaveta Berestovskaia	199.11	5	71.28	5	127.83
6	Anna Frolova	190.54	6	68.10	9	122.44
7	Elizaveta Osokina	190.50	8	66.97	8	123.53
8	Maria Paramonova	189.93	9	64.14	6	125.79
9	Polina Sviridenko	187.23	10	63.44	7	123.79
10	Ksenia Tsibinova	185.97	7	67.23	13	118.74
11	Agneta Latushkina	182.66	11	62.92	12	119.74
12	Veronika Zhilina	180.79	14	58.91	11	121.88
13	Anastasia Morozova	176.80	18	54.89	10	121.91
14	Valeria Ovchinnikova	176.36	12	60.02	15	116.34
15	Stanislava Molchanova	174.38	15	56.92	14	117.46
16	Natalia Lagutova	170.93	13	59.12	16	111.81
17	Maria Dmitrieva	167.09	16	56.78	17	110.31
18	Valeria Kostina	147.56	17	54.92	18	92.64

==== Pairs ====
Rank	Name	Total points	SP		FS	
1	Iuliia Artemeva / Mikhail Nazarychev	204.50	1	70.87	1	133.63
2	Kseniia Akhanteva / Valerii Kolesov	194.26	2	68.40	2	125.86
3	Anastasia Mukhortova / Dmitry Evgenyev	188.77	5	66.21	3	122.56
4	Polina Kostiukovich / Aleksei Briukhanov	187.33	4	67.38	4	119.95
5	Ekaterina Petushkova / Evgenii Malikov	179.85	3	67.77	6	112.08
6	Karina Safina / Sergei Bakhmat	179.07	6	65.37	5	113.70
7	Daria Boyarintseva / Maxim Shagalov	174.55	7	64.23	8	110.32
8	Natalia Khabibullina / Ilya Knyazhuk	172.07	8	61.02	7	111.05
9	Ekaterina Storublevtseva / Artem Gritsaenko	162.87	11	56.96	10	105.91
10	Alexandra Kargulina / Ilya Kalashnikov	161.98	12	53.04	9	108.94
11	Alina Raskovalova / Artyom Butaev	158.16	9	59.37	11	98.79
12	Tatyana Kuzmina / Alexei Khvalko	145.73	10	56.97	12	88.76

==== Ice dance ====
Rank	Name	Total points	RD		FD	
1	Arina Ushakova / Maxim Nekrasov	187.55	1	75.85	1	111.70
2	Elizaveta Shanaeva / Devid Naryzhnyy	184.19	3	73.75	2	110.44
3	Irina Khavronina / Dario Cirisano	181.60	2	74.08	3	107.52
4	Ekaterina Andreeva / Ivan Desyatov	167.92	4	66.05	4	101.87
5	Margarita Svistunova / Dmitrii Studenikin	163.52	5	64.74	6	98.78
6	Elizaveta Shichina / Gordey Khubulov	162.44	8	63.13	5	99.31
7	Vasilisa Kaganovskaia / Valeriy Angelopol	159.75	9	63.12	7	96.63
8	Olga Mamchenkova / Mark Volkov	158.64	6	63.66	8	94.98
9	Ekaterina Rybakova / Ivan Makhnonosov	156.10	10	61.96	9	94.14
10	Sofiia Kachushkina / Oleg Muratov	155.30	11	61.32	11	93.98
11	Angelina Lazareva / Maksim Prokofiev	151.67	7	63.52	15	88.15
12	Sofia Leonteva / Daniil Gorelkin	151.26	12	60.25	13	91.01
13	Taisiia Linchevskaia / Timur Babaev-Smirnov	150.57	13	59.31	12	91.26
14	Sofia Aleksova / Ilya Vladimirov	149.16	14	55.07	10	94.09
15	Anna Rumak / Gleb Goncharov	142.59	15	52.16	15	90.43

== International team selections ==
=== European Championships ===
The 2021 European Championships, scheduled to be held in Zagreb, Croatia from 25 to 31 January 2021, were cancelled on 10 December 2020.

=== Winter Universiade ===
The 2021 Winter Universiade, originally scheduled for 21–31 January 2021 in Lucerne, Switzerland, was postponed to 11–21 December 2021 and thus will be held during the next season.

=== European Youth Olympic Winter Festival ===
The 2021 European Youth Olympic Winter Festival, originally scheduled for 6–13 February 2021 in Vuokatti, Finland, was postponed to 11–18 December 2021 and thus will be held during the next season.

=== World Junior Championships ===
Commonly referred to as "Junior Worlds", the 2021 World Junior Championships, scheduled to take place in Harbin, China from 1 to 7 March 2021, were cancelled on 24 November 2020.

=== World Championships ===
The 2021 World Championships were held in Stockholm, Sweden from 22 to 28 March 2021. On 27 December 2020 it was officially declared that all winners of the Russian Senior Championships became the first members of the Russia's team. The other members were named on 1 March 2021.

	Men	Ladies	Pairs	Ice dance
1	Mikhail Kolyada	Anna Shcherbakova	Evgenia Tarasova / Vladimir Morozov	Alexandra Stepanova / Ivan Bukin
2	Evgeni Semenenko	Alexandra Trusova	Aleksandra Boikova / Dmitrii Kozlovskii	Tiffany Zahorski / Jonathan Guerreiro
3		Elizaveta Tuktamysheva	Anastasia Mishina / Aleksandr Galliamov	Victoria Sinitsina / Nikita Katsalapov
Alt.	Dmitri Aliev	Alena Kostornaia	Daria Pavliuchenko / Denis Khodykin	Annabelle Morozov / Andrei Bagin
Alt.	Petr Gumennik	Elizaveta Nugumanova		Anastasia Skoptsova / Kirill Aleshin

=== World Team Trophy ===
The 2021 World Team Trophy was held in Osaka, Japan from 15 to 18 April 2021. The list of participants of the Russia's team was officially published on 29 March 2021.

	Men	Ladies	Pairs	Ice dance
1	Mikhail Kolyada	Anna Shcherbakova	Anastasia Mishina / Aleksandr Galliamov	Victoria Sinitsina / Nikita Katsalapov
2	Evgeni Semenenko	Elizaveta Tuktamysheva		
Alt.	Petr Gumennik	Elizaveta Nugumanova	Aleksandra Boikova / Dmitrii Kozlovskii	Alexandra Stepanova / Ivan Bukin
Alt.	Makar Ignatov	Alexandra Trusova		Tiffany Zahorski / Jonathan Guerreiro
Alt.	Andrei Mozalev	Ksenia Tsibinova		
