= 2021 Rostelecom Cup =

Instance of Rostelecom Cup

- Type: Grand Prix
- Date: 26 – 28 November
- Season: 2021–22
- Location: Sochi, Russia
- Host: Figure Skating Federation of Russia
- Venue: Iceberg Skating Palace

Champions
- Men's singles: (Georgia (country)) Morisi Kvitelashvili
- Women's singles: (Russia) Kamila Valieva
- Pairs: (Russia) Anastasia Mishina / Aleksandr Galliamov
- Ice dance: (Russia) Victoria Sinitsina / Nikita Katsalapov
- Previous: 2020 Rostelecom Cup
- Next: 2026 Rostelecom Cup
- Previous Grand Prix: 2021 Internationaux de France
- Next Grand Prix: 2021–22 Grand Prix Final

The 2021 Rostelecom Cup was the sixth event in the 2021–22 ISU Grand Prix of Figure Skating, a senior-level international invitational competition series. It was held at the Iceberg Skating Palace in Sochi on 26–28 November. Medals were awarded in the disciplines of men's singles, women's singles, pairs, and ice dance. Skaters earned points toward qualifying for the 2021–22 Grand Prix Final.

The event was originally scheduled to be held at its traditional location of Megasport Sport Palace in Moscow, but was relocated in June after the International Ice Hockey Federation adjusted the rink size at the Megasport.

== Changes to preliminary assignments ==
The International Skating Union announced the preliminary assignments on 29 June 2021.

Discipline	Withdrew		Added		Notes	Ref.
Discipline	Date	Skater(s)	Date	Skater(s)	Notes	Ref.
Men	—N/a		September 16	(Russia) Mark Kondratiuk	Host picks	
Women	—N/a		September 16	(Russia) Maiia Khromykh	Host picks	
Pairs	—N/a		September 16	(Russia) Yasmina Kadyrova / Ivan Balchenko	Host picks	
Ice dance	—N/a		September 16	(Russia) Elizaveta Khudaiberdieva / Egor Bazin	Host picks	
Women	September 16	(Kazakhstan) Elizabet Tursynbaeva	September 29	(Belarus) Viktoriia Safonova	Retirement	
Ice dance	November 2	(France) Adelina Galyavieva / Louis Thauron	November 3	(Lithuania) Allison Reed / Saulius Ambrulevičius	Galyavieva & Thauron split.	
Men	November 15	(United States) Maxim Naumov	November 17	(Australia) Brendan Kerry	Injury	
Ice dance	November 16	(Georgia (country)) Maria Kazakova / Georgy Reviya	—N/a		Doctor's recommendations	
Men	November 17	(Japan) Yuzuru Hanyu	November 18	(Georgia (country)) Nika Egadze	Injury	
Pairs	November 17	(Germany) Annika Hocke / Robert Kunkel	November 18	(Hungary) Ioulia Chtchetinina / Márk Magyar	Injury recovery (Kunkel)	
Ice dance	November 22	(Poland) Natalia Kaliszek / Maksym Spodyriev	—N/a			

== Records ==
The following new ISU best scores were set during this competition:

Discipline	Component	Skater(s)	Score	Date	Ref
Women	Short program	(Russia) Kamila Valieva	87.42	26 November 2021	
Women	Free skating	(Russia) Kamila Valieva	185.29	27 November 2021	
Women	Total score	(Russia) Kamila Valieva	272.71	27 November 2021	

== Results ==
=== Men ===
Rank	Name	Nation	Total points	SP		FS	
1	Morisi Kvitelashvili	Georgia	266.33	2	95.37	3	170.96
2	Mikhail Kolyada	Russia	264.64	4	84.48	1	180.16
3	Kazuki Tomono	Japan	264.19	1	95.81	5	168.38
4	Roman Sadovsky	Canada	253.80	3	84.59	4	169.21
5	Matteo Rizzo	Italy	250.47	9	77.45	2	173.02
6	Evgeni Semenenko	Russia	246.66	7	81.00	6	165.66
7	Camden Pulkinen	United States	237.97	5	83.47	9	154.50
8	Mark Kondratiuk	Russia	231.88	11	74.16	8	157.72
9	Keiji Tanaka	Japan	229.75	10	76.69	10	153.06
10	Michal Březina	Czech Republic	219.59	6	82.31	11	137.28
11	Nika Egadze	Georgia	210.17	12	50.35	7	159.82
12	Brendan Kerry	Australia	204.19	8	80.48	12	123.71

=== Women ===
Rank	Name	Nation	Total points	SP		FS	
1	Kamila Valieva	Russia	272.71	1	87.42	1	185.29
2	Elizaveta Tuktamysheva	Russia	229.23	2	80.10	3	149.13
3	Maiia Khromykh	Russia	219.69	5	64.72	2	154.97
4	Mariah Bell	United States	210.35	3	69.37	4	140.98
5	Loena Hendrickx	Belgium	203.69	6	64.44	5	139.25
6	Madeline Schizas	Canada	192.14	4	67.49	7	124.32
7	Viktoriia Safonova	Belarus	185.64	9	58.19	6	127.45
8	Rino Matsuike	Japan	184.36	7	62.98	8	121.38
9	Ekaterina Kurakova	Poland	175.64	11	56.43	9	119.21
10	Ekaterina Ryabova	Azerbaijan	175.24	8	58.87	10	116.37
11	Eva-Lotta Kiibus	Estonia	163.11	12	49.26	11	113.85
12	Olga Mikutina	Austria	161.09	10	57.09	12	104.00

=== Pairs ===
Rank	Name	Nation	Total points	SP		FS	
1	Anastasia Mishina / Aleksandr Galliamov	Russia	226.98	2	73.64	1	153.34
2	Daria Pavliuchenko / Denis Khodykin	Russia	212.59	1	73.91	2	138.68
3	Yasmina Kadyrova / Ivan Balchenko	Russia	193.58	3	69.39	3	124.19
4	Audrey Lu / Misha Mitrofanov	United States	186.16	4	64.97	4	121.19
5	Kirsten Moore-Towers / Michael Marinaro	Canada	177.72	7	58.95	5	118.77
6	Ioulia Chtchetinina / Márk Magyar	Hungary	175.80	5	63.99	7	111.81
7	Nicole Della Monica / Matteo Guarise	Italy	172.85	6	59.92	6	112.93
8	Miriam Ziegler / Severin Kiefer	Austria	163.80	8	58.53	8	105.27

=== Ice dance ===
Rank	Name	Nation	Total points	SP		FS	
1	Victoria Sinitsina / Nikita Katsalapov	Russia	211.72	1	86.81	1	124.91
2	Charlène Guignard / Marco Fabbri	Italy	203.71	2	79.56	2	124.15
3	Laurence Fournier Beaudry / Nikolaj Sørensen	Canada	191.40	3	76.39	3	115.01
4	Sara Hurtado / Kirill Khaliavin	Spain	189.94	4	75.94	4	114.00
5	Kaitlin Hawayek / Jean-Luc Baker	United States	187.62	5	73.72	5	113.90
6	Anastasia Skoptsova / Kirill Aleshin	Russia	180.93	6	71.95	6	108.98
7	Allison Reed / Saulius Ambrulevičius	Lithuania	177.88	7	71.43	8	106.45
8	Elizaveta Khudaiberdieva / Egor Bazin	Russia	177.51	8	71.05	7	106.46

== Works cited ==
- "Special Regulations & Technical Rules – Single & Pair Skating and Ice Dance 2021". International Skating Union. Archived from the original on April 4, 2022.
