= Daria Pavliuchenko =

Russian pair skater (born 2002)

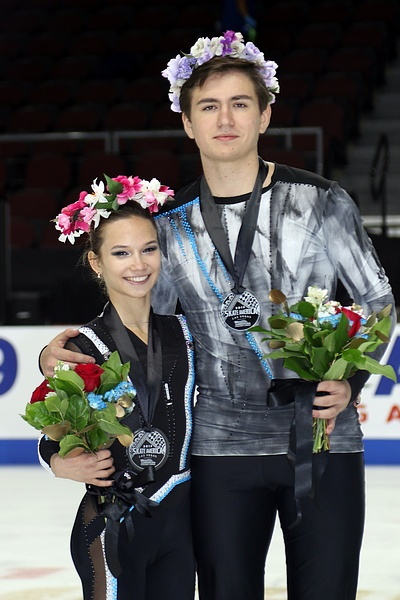
- Pavliuchenko/Khodykin at the 2019 Skate America

Personal information
- Native name: Дарья Максимовна Павлюченко
- Full name: Daria Maksimovna Pavliuchenko
- Other names: Darya Pavlyuchenko
- Born: 31 December 2002 (age 23) Moscow, Russia
- Home town: Moscow, Russia
- Height: 1.47 m (4 ft 10 in)

Figure skating career
- Country: Russia
- Partner: Denis Khodykin
- Coach: Sergei Dobroskokov, Sergei Rosliakov
- Skating club: Sport School No. 2, Moscow
- Began skating: 2006
Medal record
Representing Russia
Figure skating: Pairs
European Championships
Bronze medal – third place	2020 Graz	Pairs
World Junior Championships
Gold medal – first place	2018 Sofia	Pairs
Junior Grand Prix Final
Bronze medal – third place	2017–18 Nagoya	Pairs

Daria Maksimovna Pavliuchenko (Russian: Дарья Максимовна Павлюченко, born 31 December 2002) is a Russian pair skater. With her skating partner, Denis Khodykin, she is the 2020 European bronze medalist, the 2019 Internationaux de France and 2019 Skate America silver medalist, and the 2018 Grand Prix of Helsinki and 2018 Rostelecom Cup bronze medalist. Earlier in their career, they won gold at the 2018 World Junior Championships and bronze at the 2017 Junior Grand Prix Final.

== Career ==
=== Early years ===
Pavliuchenko began learning to skate in 2006. She initially trained as a single skater. She left skating for eight months when she was twelve years old, after Eteri Tutberidze suggested that she try pairs, but then decided to try it.

Pavliuchenko and Denis Khodykin teamed up in 2016, coached by Sergei Dobroskokov and Sergei Rosliakov in Moscow. The pair placed fifth at the 2017 Russian Junior Championships.

=== 2017–2018 season: World Junior title ===
Pavliuchenko/Khodykin made their international debut in late September 2017 at a Junior Grand Prix (JGP) competition in Minsk, Belarus. They outscored their teammates, Anastasia Poluianova / Dmitry Sopot, by about four points to win the gold medal. After taking silver at their next JGP assignment, in Gdańsk, Poland, they qualified to the Junior Grand Prix Final. At the final, held in December in Nagoya, Japan, the pair placed third in the short program, with a fall by Pavliuchenko on the throw jump, and second in the free skate. They received the bronze medal, finishing third behind Australia's Ekaterina Alexandrovskaya / Harley Windsor and Russia's Apollinariia Panfilova / Dmitry Rylov.

Later that month, Pavliuchenko/Khodykin competed on the senior level, at the 2018 Russian Championships. Ranked sixth in both segments, they finished sixth overall behind Aleksandra Boikova / Dmitrii Kozlovskii. In January, they won the Russian junior title by a margin of more than eleven points.

In March, they won gold at the 2018 World Junior Championships in Sofia, Bulgaria. Ranked first in both segments, they outscored the other medalists by more than twelve points. Together with Polina Kostiukovich / Dmitrii Ialin and Anastasia Mishina / Aleksandr Galiamov, they produced a Russian sweep of the pairs' podium.

=== 2018–2019 season ===
Pavliuchenko/Khodykin started their international senior career at the 2018 CS Finlandia Trophy where they finished fifth. Two weeks later they won their first international senior medal (bronze) at the 2018 Ice Star.

In early November they made their Grand Prix debut at 2018 Grand Prix of Helsinki where they won the bronze medal with a personal best score of 185.61 points. In mid November they won their second Grand Prix bronze medal of the season at the 2018 Rostelecom Cup with a personal best score of 190.01 points. They ranked third in the short program and fourth in the free skate and won the bronze medal behind their teammates Evgenia Tarasova / Vladimir Morozov (gold) and Nicole Della Monica / Matteo Guarise (silver). With 2 Grand Prix bronze medals they qualified for the 2018–19 Grand Prix Final, where they finished sixth.

At the 2019 Russian Championships, Pavliuchenko/Khodykin finished fourth. When Natalya Zabiyako / Alexander Enbert withdrew from the 2019 European Championships, Pavliuchenko/Khodykin were named as their replacements on the Russian team. They placed fifth in the short program, sixth in the free skate, and fifth overall. In the free skate, Pavliuchenko fell on their throw triple loop, which she attributed to a lack of confidence on her part. Khodykin called the European Championships a valuable experience.

=== 2019–2020 season ===
Beginning the Grand Prix at 2019 Skate America, Pavliuchenko/Khodykin won the silver medal after finishing second in the short program and third in the free skate, after a fall on a throw triple flip. At their second event, the 2019 Internationaux de France, they led the field after the short program but dropped to second place in the free skate after Pavliuchenko fell on both their triple flip jump and a throw triple loop. Despite the errors Pavliuchenko indicated she was pleased with the results.

Qualifying to their second Grand Prix Final, Pavliuchenko/Khodykin placed third in the short programs, four points clear of the fourth-place Mishina/Galliamov and only two points back of first. The free skate proved difficult, with Pavliuchenko falling twice, once in their opening transitional moves and once on their throw triple flip, in addition to a smaller error on their twist lift. Sixth in the free, they dropped to sixth overall. She remarked afterward that the opening fall had discomfited her going into the later elements, adding "I hope it won’t happen again. I will work on it."

Skating cleanly in the short program at the 2020 Russian Championships, they placed third in the short program. Fourth in the free skate with only a minor error on one throw, they won the bronze medal overall. Pavliuchenko commented that "there were still some small errors, but finally we were able to put out a clean free skate again."

Pavliuchenko/Khodykin were named to the Russian team to the European Championships again, and placed second in the short program after a lift error by Tarasova/Morozov unexpectedly knocked them into third place. Third in the free skate with one throw fall, they won the bronze medal overall after Tarasova/Morozov recovered their place. This proved to be their final competition for the season, as they had been assigned to compete at the World Championships in Montreal, but these were cancelled as a result of the coronavirus pandemic.

=== 2020–2021 season ===
Pavliuchenko/Khodykin debuted their programs at the senior Russian test skates. Competing on the domestic Cup of Russia series, they won gold medals at the second stage in Moscow and the third stage in Sochi. They were scheduled to compete on the Grand Prix, but withdrew after announcing that Khodykin contracted an acute respiratory infection. It was subsequently revealed that both skaters had in fact contracted COVID-19.

Returning to the ice for the 2021 Russian Championships, Pavliuchenko/Khodykin placed third in the short program with a clean skate. Third in the free skate as well, they won their second consecutive national bronze medal. Khodykin expressed satisfaction and their overcoming "a long period of poor long programs."

Following the national championships, Pavliuchenko/Khodykin participated in the 2021 Channel One Trophy, a televised team competition held in lieu of the cancelled European Championships. They were selected for the Red Machine team captained by Alina Zagitova, and placed fourth in both segments of the event, while the Red Machine won the trophy. Following this, they were set to compete at the Russian Cup Final, which was widely perceived as a contest between them and Mishina/Galliamov for the third Russian pairs berth for the 2021 World Championships in Stockholm. Pavliuchenko fell on their throw jump in the short program at the Final, resulting in them placing ten points behind Mishina/Galliamov in that segment. Second as well in the free skate, they took the Final silver.

At the end of March, Pavliuchenko was diagnosed with mononucleosis.

=== 2021–2022 season ===
Pavliuchenko and Khodykin withdrew from the senior Russian test skates, citing illness.

Returning to competition on the Grand Prix, Pavliuchenko/Khodykin took the silver medal at the 2021 Skate Canada International. They struggled in the free program with errors on two jumps and a throw. Khodykin said after "our free program was bad and we know this. We know why and what to do and how to work to be better and to skate cleaner." They won another silver medal at their second event, the 2021 Rostelecom Cup. The results qualified them for the Grand Prix Final, to be held in Osaka, but it was subsequently cancelled due to restrictions prompted by the Omicron variant.

At the 2022 Russian Championships, Pavliuchenko/Khodykin placed fifth in the short program after a jump step-out from Khodykin. Pavliuchenko made two jump errors in the free skate, but they moved up to fourth in that segment and fourth overall.

== Programs ==
=== With Khodykin ===
Season	Short program	Free skating	Exhibition
2022–2023	Индиго (Indigo) by Dana Sokolova, feat. Скруджи	Black Swan by Clint Mansell choreo. by Alexander Zhulin	
2021–2022	Be Italian (from Nine) by Fergie choreo. by Betina Popova	Black Swan by Clint Mansell choreo. by Alexander Zhulin	
2020–2021	Sing, Sing, Sing by Louis Prima performed by Benny Goodman choreo. by Betina Popova	S.O.S d'un terrien en detresse by Grégory Lemarchal	
2019–2020	The Storm by Balázs Havasi choreo by Tatiana Tarasova	Tron: Legacy by Daft Punk choreo by Daniil Gleikhengauz	
2018–2019	When Winter Comes performed by André Rieu	The Great Gatsby (soundtrack)	
2017–2018	Cloud Atlas by Tom Tykwer, Johnny Klimek, Reinhold Heil	Chicago	

== Competitive highlights ==
GP: Grand Prix; CS: Challenger Series; JGP: Junior Grand Prix

=== With Khodykin ===
International
Event	16–17	17–18	18–19	19–20	20–21	21–22
Worlds				C		
Europeans			5th	3rd		
GP Final			6th	6th		C
GP Finland			3rd			
GP France				2nd		
GP Rostelecom			3rd		WD	2nd
GP Skate America				2nd		
GP Skate Canada						2nd
CS Finlandia			5th			
Ice Star			3rd			
International: Junior
Junior Worlds		1st				
JGP Final		3rd				
JGP Belarus		1st				
JGP Poland		2nd				
National
Russian Champ.		6th	4th	3rd	3rd	4th
Russian Junior	5th	1st				
TBD = Assigned; WD = Withdrew; C = Event cancelled

== Detailed results ==
Small medals for short and free programs awarded only at ISU Championships.

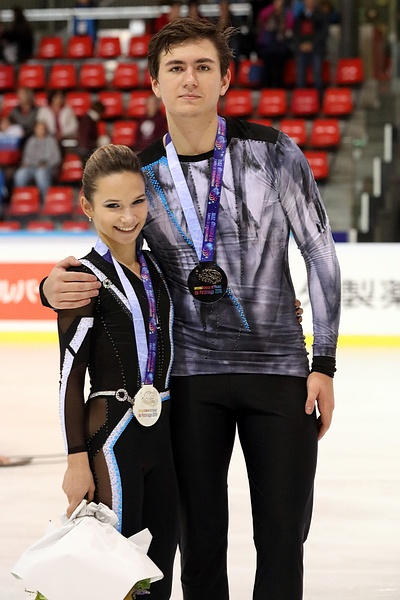
Pavlyuchenko and Khodykin at the 2019 Internationaux de France.

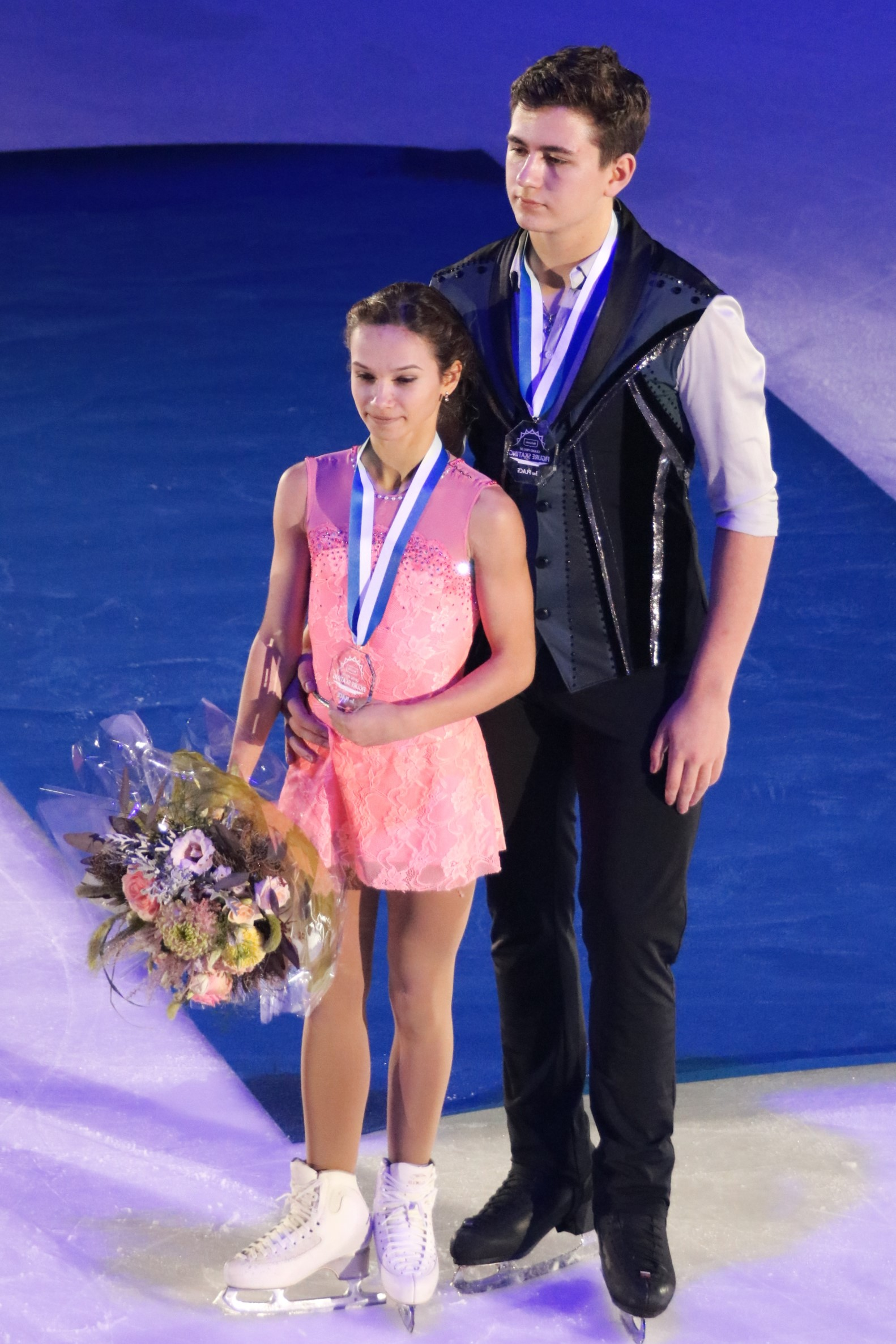
Pavlyuchenko and Khodykin at the 2018 Grand Prix of Helsinki.

=== With Khodykin ===
Senior level

2021–22 season
Date	Event	SP	FS	Total
December 21–26, 2021	2022 Russian Championships	5; 75.40	4; 144.78	4; 220.18
November 26–28, 2021	2021 Rostelecom Cup	1; 73.91	2; 138.68	2; 212.59
October 29–31, 2021	2021 Skate Canada International	2; 69.46	3; 123.62	2; 193.08
2020–21 season
Date	Event	SP	FS	Total
Feb. 26 – Mar. 2, 2021	2021 Russian Cup Final domestic competition	3; 70.14	2; 146.79	2; 216.93
February 5–7, 2021	2021 Channel One Trophy	4; 75.73	4; 143.58	1T/4P; 219.31
December 23–27, 2020	2021 Russian Championships	3; 77.01	3; 144.38	3; 221.39
November 20–22, 2020	2020 Rostelecom Cup	WD	WD	WD
October 23–27, 2020	2020 Cup of Russia Series, 3rd Stage, Sochi domestic competition	1; 75.94	2; 130.82	1; 206.76
October 10–13, 2020	2020 Cup of Russia Series, 2nd Stage, Moscow domestic competition	1; 71.97	1; 136.42	1; 208.39
2019–20 season
Date	Event	SP	FS	Total
January 24–25, 2020	2020 European Championships	2; 74.92	3; 131.61	3; 206.53
December 24–29, 2019	2020 Russian Championships	3; 76.13	4; 143.59	3; 219.72
December 4–8, 2019	2019–20 Grand Prix Final	3; 75.16	6; 119.59	6; 194.75
November 1–3, 2019	2019 Internationaux de France	1; 76.59	3; 129.97	2; 206.56
October 18–20, 2019	2019 Skate America	2; 71.25	2; 125.73	2; 196.98
2018–19 season
Date	Event	SP	FS	Total
January 21–27, 2019	2019 European Championships	5; 65.89	6; 120.03	5; 185.92
December 19–23, 2018	2019 Russian Championships	5; 71.56	4; 137.59	4; 209.15
December 6–9, 2018	2018–19 Grand Prix Final	6; 61.24	5; 125.57	6; 186.81
November 16–18, 2018	2018 Rostelecom Cup	3; 69.38	4; 120.63	3; 190.01
November 2–4, 2018	2018 Grand Prix of Helsinki	3; 63.80	2; 121.81	3; 185.61
October 18–21, 2018	2018 Ice Star	2; 63.58	3; 97.45	3; 161.03
October 4–7, 2018	2018 CS Finlandia Trophy	4; 63.47	5; 111.58	5; 175.05

Junior level

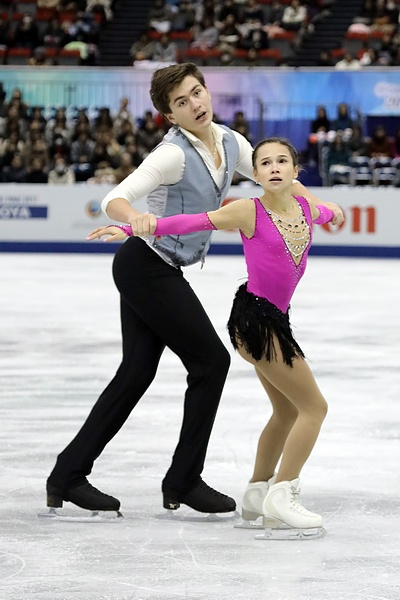
Pavlyuchenko and Khodykin at the 2017–18 JGP Final.

2017–18 season
Date	Event	Level	SP	FS	Total
5–11 March 2018	2018 World Junior Championships	Junior	1; 63.12	1; 117.41	1; 180.53
23–26 January 2018	2018 Russian Junior Championships	Junior	1; 64.16	1; 124.21	1; 188.37
21–24 December 2017	2018 Russian Championships	Senior	6; 65.07	6; 126.54	6; 191.61
7–10 December 2017	2017–18 JGP Final	Junior	3; 59.51	2; 113.43	3; 172.94
4–7 October 2017	2017 JGP Poland	Junior	2; 59.99	2; 104.81	2; 164.80
20–24 September 2017	2017 JGP Belarus	Junior	2; 56.29	1; 109.95	1; 166.24
2016–17 season
Date	Event	Level	SP	FS	Total
1–5 February 2017	2017 Russian Junior Championships	Junior	4; 62.75	7; 103.82	5; 166.57
