= 2016–17 Grand Prix of Figure Skating Final =

2016–17 Grand Prix Final
- Type: Grand Prix
- Date: December 8 – 11, 2016
- Season: 2016–17
- Location: Marseille, France
- Host: FFSG
- Venue: Palais omnisports Marseille Grand-Est

Champions
- Men's singles: (Japan) Yuzuru Hanyu (S) (Russia) Dmitri Aliev (J)
- Ladies' singles: (Russia) Evgenia Medvedeva (S) (Russia) Alina Zagitova (J)
- Pairs: (Russia) Evgenia Tarasova / Vladimir Morozov (S) (Russia) Anastasia Mishina / Vladislav Mirzoev (J)
- Ice dance: (Canada) Tessa Virtue / Scott Moir (S) (United States) Rachel Parsons / Michael Parsons (J)
- Previous: 2015–16 Grand Prix Final
- Next: 2017–18 Grand Prix Final
- Previous Grand Prix: 2016 NHK Trophy

The 2016–17 Grand Prix of Figure Skating Final and ISU Junior Grand Prix Final took place from 8 to 11 December 2016 at the Palais omnisports Marseille Grand-Est in Marseille, France. Marseille was announced as the host on 27 October 2015. The combined event is the culmination of two international series — the Grand Prix of Figure Skating and the Junior Grand Prix. Medals will be awarded in the disciplines of men's singles, ladies' singles, pair skating, and ice dancing on the senior and junior levels.

== Records ==
The following new ISU best scores were set during this competition:

Event	Component	Skater(s)	Score	Date	Ref
Junior ladies	Short program	(Russia) Alina Zagitova	70.92	8 December 2016	
Junior ladies	Free skating	(Russia) Anastasiia Gubanova	133.77	9 December 2016	
Junior ladies	Free skating	(Russia) Alina Zagitova	136.51	9 December 2016	
Junior ladies	Total score	(Russia) Alina Zagitova	207.43	9 December 2016	
Ice dancing	Short dance	(Canada) Tessa Virtue / Scott Moir	80.50	9 December 2016	
Ladies	Short program	(Russia) Evgenia Medvedeva	79.21	9 December 2016	
Junior men	Total score	(Russia) Dmitri Aliev	240.07	10 December 2016	
Ice dancing	Total score	(Canada) Tessa Virtue / Scott Moir	197.22	10 December 2016	

Two consecutive world records has been set in back to back performances during the junior ladies free skating segment by Russian ladies Anastasiia Gubanova, who became the first junior lady to break the 130-points barrier, and Alina Zagitova, who outscored her by almost 3 points.

Zagitova also became the first junior lady to break the 70-points barrier in the short program, Dmitri Aliev the first junior man to break the 240-points barrier for the total score, while Tessa Virtue and Scott Moir became the first ice dancers to break the 80-points barrier in the short dance.

== Schedule ==
(Local time)

Thursday, December 8

- 14:05 - Junior: Short dance
- 15:20 - Junior: Men's short
- 16:25 - Junior: Pairs' short
- 17:40 - Junior: Ladies' short
- Opening ceremony
- 19:45 - Senior: Pairs' short
- 21:10 - Senior: Men's short

Friday, December 9

- 15:45 - Junior: Free dance
- 17:05 - Junior: Ladies' free
- 19:05 - Senior: Short dance
- 20:20 - Senior: Pairs' free
- 21:45 - Senior: Ladies' short

Saturday, December 10

- 14:00 - Junior: Men's free
- 15:20 - Junior: Pairs' free
- 16:45 - Senior: Free dance
- 19:00 - Senior: Ladies' free
- 20:20 - Senior: Men's free
- Awards ceremony

Sunday, December 11

- Gala exhibition

== Qualifiers ==
=== Senior-level qualifiers ===
	Men	Ladies	Pairs	Ice dancing
1	(Spain) Javier Fernández	(Russia) Evgenia Medvedeva	(Canada) Meagan Duhamel / Eric Radford	(Canada) Tessa Virtue / Scott Moir
2	(Canada) Patrick Chan	(Russia) Anna Pogorilaya	(Germany) ~~Aliona Savchenko / Bruno Massot~~ (withdrew)	(United States) Maia Shibutani / Alex Shibutani
3	(Japan) Yuzuru Hanyu	(Russia) Elena Radionova	(China) Yu Xiaoyu / Zhang Hao	(France) Gabriella Papadakis / Guillaume Cizeron
4	(Japan) Shoma Uno	(Canada) Kaetlyn Osmond	(China) Peng Cheng / Jin Yang	(Russia) Ekaterina Bobrova / Dmitri Soloviev
5	(United States) Nathan Chen	(Russia) Maria Sotskova	(Russia) Evgenia Tarasova / Vladimir Morozov	(United States) Madison Chock / Evan Bates
6	(United States) Adam Rippon	(Japan) Satoko Miyahara	(Canada) Julianne Séguin / Charlie Bilodeau	(United States) Madison Hubbell / Zachary Donohue
Alternates
1st	(China) Jin Boyang	(United States) Ashley Wagner	(Russia) Natalia Zabiiako / Alexander Enbert (called up)	(Canada) Kaitlyn Weaver / Andrew Poje
2nd	(Russia) Sergei Voronov	(Russia) Elizaveta Tuktamysheva	(United States) Haven Denney / Brandon Frazier	(Canada) Piper Gilles / Paul Poirier
3rd	(Israel) Oleksii Bychenko	(Japan) Mai Mihara	(Canada) Lubov Ilyushechkina / Dylan Moscovitch	(Italy) Anna Cappellini / Luca Lanotte

=== Junior-level qualifiers ===
	Men	Ladies	Pairs	Ice dance
1	(Russia) Alexander Samarin	(Russia) Anastasiia Gubanova	(Russia) Anastasia Mishina / Vladislav Mirzoev	(Russia) Alla Loboda / Pavel Drozd
2	(South Korea) Cha Jun-hwan	(Russia) ~~Polina Tsurskaya~~ (withdrew)	(Czech Republic) Anna Dušková / Martin Bidař	(United States) Rachel Parsons / Michael Parsons
3	(United States) Alexei Krasnozhon	(Japan) Rika Kihira	(Russia) Alina Ustimkina / Nikita Volodin	(United States) Lorraine McNamara / Quinn Carpenter
4	(Russia) Roman Savosin	(Japan) Kaori Sakamoto	(Russia) Amina Atakhanova / Ilia Spiridonov	(France) Angélique Abachkina / Louis Thauron
5	(Russia) Ilia Skirda	(Russia) Alina Zagitova	(Russia) Aleksandra Boikova / Dmitrii Kozlovskii	(United States) Christina Carreira / Anthony Ponomarenko
6	(Russia) Dmitri Aliev	(Japan) Marin Honda	(Russia) ~~Ekaterina Borisova / Dmitry Sopot~~ (withdrew)	(Russia) Anastasia Shpilevaya / Grigory Smirnov
Alternates
1st	(United States) Vincent Zhou	(Russia) Elizaveta Nugumanova (called up)	(Australia) Ekaterina Alexandrovskaya / Harley Windsor (called up)	(Russia) Anastasia Skoptcova / Kirill Aleshin
2nd	(United States) Andrew Torgashev	(Russia) Stanislava Konstantinova	(United States) Chelsea Liu / Brian Johnson	(Russia) Sofia Polishchuk / Alexander Vakhnov
3rd	(Canada) Roman Sadovsky	(Japan) Yuna Shiraiwa	(Canada) Lori-Ann Matte / Thierry Ferland	(Czech Republic) Nicole Kuzmich / Alexandr Sinicyn

=== Changes ===
Date	Discipline	Withdrew	Added	Reason/Other notes	Refs
November 29	Junior ladies	(Russia) Polina Tsurskaya	(Russia) Elizaveta Nugumanova	Knee injury	
November 29	Junior pairs	(Russia) Ekaterina Borisova / Dmitry Sopot	(Australia) Ekaterina Alexandrovskaya / Harley Windsor	—N/a	
December 2	Senior pairs	(Germany) Aliona Savchenko / Bruno Massot	(Russia) Natalia Zabiiako / Alexander Enbert	Ankle injury	

== Medalists ==
=== Senior ===
Discipline	Gold	Silver	Bronze
Men	(Japan) Yuzuru Hanyu	(United States) Nathan Chen	(Japan) Shoma Uno
Ladies	(Russia) Evgenia Medvedeva	(Japan) Satoko Miyahara	(Russia) Anna Pogorilaya
Pairs	(Russia) Evgenia Tarasova / Vladimir Morozov	(China) Yu Xiaoyu / Zhang Hao	(Canada) Meagan Duhamel / Eric Radford
Ice dancing	(Canada) Tessa Virtue / Scott Moir	(France) Gabriella Papadakis / Guillaume Cizeron	(United States) Maia Shibutani / Alex Shibutani

=== Junior ===
Discipline	Gold	Silver	Bronze
Men	(Russia) Dmitri Aliev	(Russia) Alexander Samarin	(South Korea) Cha Jun-hwan
Ladies	(Russia) Alina Zagitova	(Russia) Anastasiia Gubanova	(Japan) Kaori Sakamoto
Pairs	(Russia) Anastasia Mishina / Vladislav Mirzoev	(Czech Republic) Anna Dušková / Martin Bidař	(Russia) Aleksandra Boikova / Dmitrii Kozlovskii
Ice dancing	(United States) Rachel Parsons / Michael Parsons	(Russia) Alla Loboda / Pavel Drozd	(United States) Lorraine McNamara / Quinn Carpenter

== Medals table ==
=== Senior ===
Rank	Nation	Gold	Silver	Bronze	Total
1	Russia (RUS)	2	0	1	3
2	Japan (JPN)	1	1	1	3
3	Canada (CAN)	1	0	1	2
4	United States (USA)	0	1	1	2
5	China (CHN)	0	1	0	1
5	France (FRA)	0	1	0	1
Totals (6 entries)		4	4	4	12

=== Junior ===
Rank	Nation	Gold	Silver	Bronze	Total
1	Russia (RUS)	3	3	1	7
2	United States (USA)	1	0	1	2
3	Czech Republic (CZE)	0	1	0	1
4	Japan (JPN)	0	0	1	1
4	South Korea (KOR)	0	0	1	1
Totals (5 entries)		4	4	4	12

== Senior-level results ==
=== Men ===
Rank	Name	Nation	Total points	SP		FS	
1	Yuzuru Hanyu	Japan	293.90	1	106.53	3	187.37
2	Nathan Chen	United States	282.85	5	85.30	1	197.55
3	Shoma Uno	Japan	282.51	4	86.82	2	195.69
4	Javier Fernández	Spain	268.77	3	91.76	4	177.01
5	Patrick Chan	Canada	266.75	2	99.76	5	166.99
6	Adam Rippon	United States	233.10	6	83.93	6	149.17

=== Ladies ===
Evgenia Medvedeva set a new world record for the short program (79.21 points).

Rank	Name	Nation	Total points	SP		FS	
1	Evgenia Medvedeva	Russia	227.66	1	79.21	1	148.45
2	Satoko Miyahara	Japan	218.33	3	74.64	2	143.69
3	Anna Pogorilaya	Russia	216.47	4	73.29	3	143.18
4	Kaetlyn Osmond	Canada	212.45	2	75.54	4	136.91
5	Maria Sotskova	Russia	198.79	6	65.74	5	133.05
6	Elena Radionova	Russia	188.81	5	68.98	6	119.83

=== Pairs ===
Rank	Name	Nation	Total points	SP		FS	
1	Evgenia Tarasova / Vladimir Morozov	Russia	213.85	1	78.60	1	135.25
2	Yu Xiaoyu / Zhang Hao	China	206.71	2	75.34	3	131.37
3	Meagan Duhamel / Eric Radford	Canada	205.99	3	71.44	2	134.55
4	Natalia Zabiiako / Alexander Enbert	Russia	188.32	5	65.79	5	122.53
5	Julianne Séguin / Charlie Bilodeau	Canada	186.85	6	60.86	4	125.99
6	Peng Cheng / Jin Yang	China	183.19	4	70.84	6	112.35

=== Ice dancing ===
Tessa Virtue and Scott Moir set a new world record for the short dance (80.50 points) and for the combined total (197.22 points).

Rank	Name	Nation	Total points	SP		FS	
1	Tessa Virtue / Scott Moir	Canada	197.22	1	80.50	1	116.72
2	Gabriella Papadakis / Guillaume Cizeron	France	192.81	3	77.86	2	114.95
3	Maia Shibutani / Alex Shibutani	United States	189.60	2	77.97	3	111.63
4	Ekaterina Bobrova / Dmitri Soloviev	Russia	181.95	4	74.04	5	107.91
5	Madison Hubbell / Zachary Donohue	United States	179.59	5	72.47	6	107.12
6	Madison Chock / Evan Bates	United States	179.32	6	70.87	4	108.45

== Junior-level results ==
=== Men ===
Dmitri Aliev set a new junior world record for the combined total score (240.07 points).

Rank	Name	Nation	Total points	SP		FS	
1	Dmitri Aliev	Russia	240.07	1	81.37	1	158.70
2	Alexander Samarin	Russia	236.52	2	81.08	2	155.44
3	Cha Jun-hwan	South Korea	225.55	4	71.85	3	153.70
4	Roman Savosin	Russia	212.39	3	72.98	4	139.41
5	Alexei Krasnozhon	United States	208.85	5	71.48	6	137.37
6	Ilia Skirda	Russia	207.11	6	68.31	5	138.80

=== Ladies ===
Alina Zagitova set a new junior world record for the short program (70.92 points), for the free skating (136.51 points), and for the combined total (207.43 points). Anastasiia Gubanova set a new junior world record for the free skating (133.77 points) but Zagitova broke that record less than 10 minutes later.

Rank	Name	Nation	Total points	SP		FS	
1	Alina Zagitova	Russia	207.43	1	70.92	1	136.51
2	Anastasiia Gubanova	Russia	194.07	3	60.38	2	133.77
3	Kaori Sakamoto	Japan	176.33	2	64.48	4	111.85
4	Rika Kihira	Japan	175.16	5	54.78	3	120.38
5	Elizaveta Nugumanova	Russia	170.08	4	58.34	5	111.74
WD	Marin Honda	Japan	withdrew	withdrew from competition			

=== Pairs ===
Rank	Name	Nation	Total points	SP		FS	
1	Anastasia Mishina / Vladislav Mirzoev	Russia	180.63	1	64.73	1	115.90
2	Anna Dušková / Martin Bidař	Czech Republic	167.76	2	61.38	2	106.38
3	Aleksandra Boikova / Dmitrii Kozlovskii	Russia	159.72	4	58.75	3	100.97
4	Alina Ustimkina / Nikita Volodin	Russia	158.14	3	59.05	4	99.09
5	Ekaterina Alexandrovskaya / Harley Windsor	Australia	141.36	5	57.08	5	84.28
6	Amina Atakhanova / Ilia Spiridonov	Russia	139.50	6	56.78	6	82.72

=== Ice dancing ===
Rank	Name	Nation	Total points	SD		FD	
1	Rachel Parsons / Michael Parsons	United States	162.50	2	66.91	1	95.59
2	Alla Loboda / Pavel Drozd	Russia	161.87	1	67.58	2	94.29
3	Lorraine McNamara / Quinn Carpenter	United States	153.47	3	63.73	3	89.74
4	Christina Carreira / Anthony Ponomarenko	United States	149.98	4	61.39	4	88.59
5	Angélique Abachkina / Louis Thauron	France	146.12	5	60.08	5	86.04
6	Anastasia Shpilevaya / Grigory Smirnov	Russia	140.64	6	59.29	6	81.35
