= Anna Dušková =

Czech figure skater (born 1999)

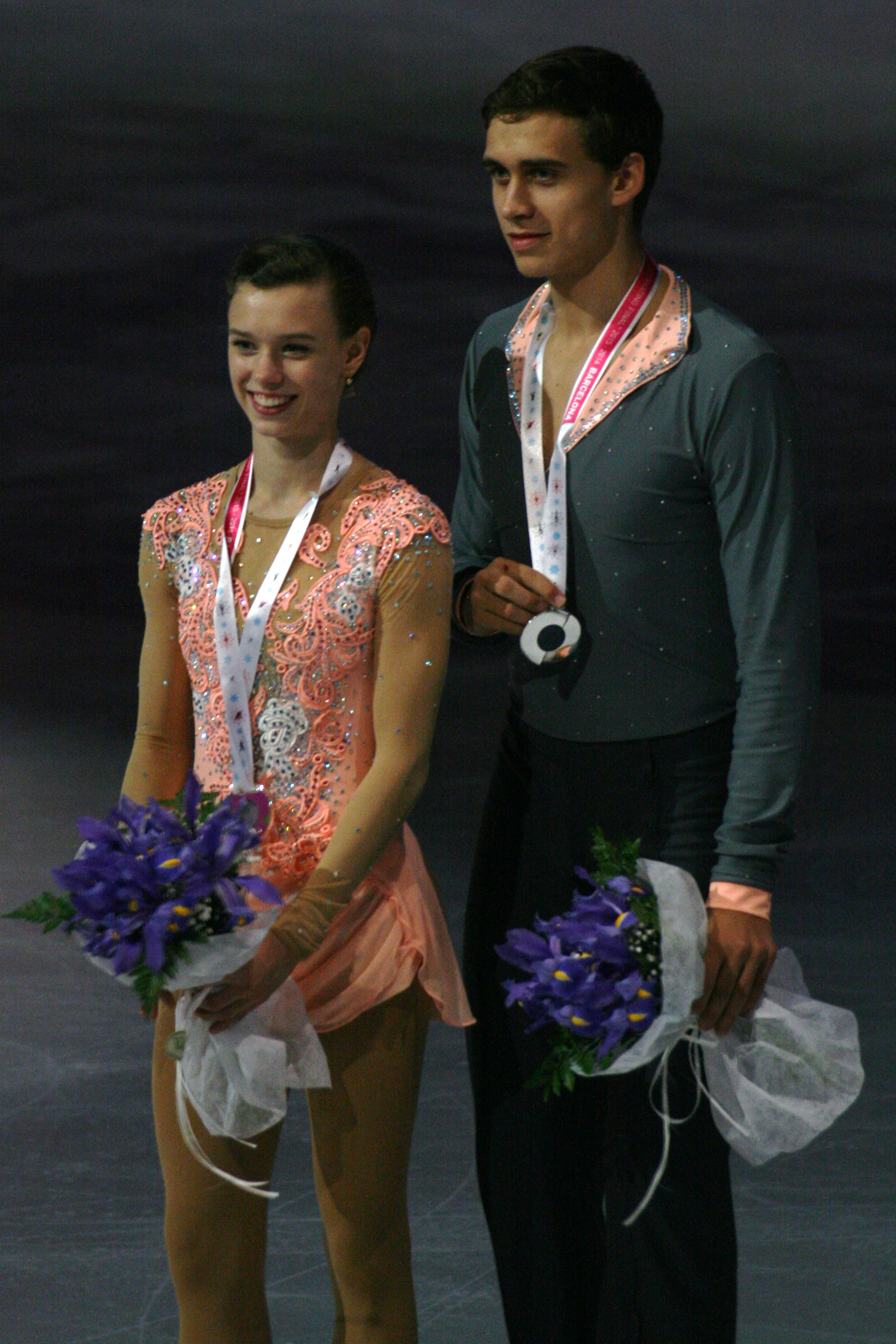
- Dušková and Bidař at the 2015–16 JGP Final

Personal information
- Born: 30 December 1999 (age 26) Nymburk, Czech Republic
- Home town: Lysá nad Labem, Czech Republic
- Height: 1.58 m (5 ft 2 in)

Figure skating career
- Country: Czech Republic
- Coach: Eva Horklová, Richard Gauthier, Bruno Marcotte
- Skating club: USK Praha
- Began skating: 2004
- Retired: June 24, 2020

Medal record
Czech Championships
Bronze medal – third place	2016 Třinec	Singles
Winter Youth Olympics
Silver medal – second place	2016 Lillehammer	Pairs
Silver medal – second place	2016 Lillehammer	Team
World Junior Championships
Gold medal – first place	2016 Debrecen	Pairs
Junior Grand Prix Final
Silver medal – second place	2015–16 Barcelona	Pairs
Silver medal – second place	2016–17 Marseille	Pairs

Anna Dušková (born 30 December 1999) is a Czech medical doctor and retired figure skater. Competing in pairs with partner Martin Bidař, she is the 2016 World Junior champion, 2016 Youth Olympic silver medalist (individually and in the team event), and 2015 JGP Final silver medalist. As a single skater, she is the 2015 NRW Trophy bronze medalist.

== Personal life ==
Dušková was born on 30 December 1999 in Nymburk, Czech Republic.

== Skating career ==
=== Single skating ===
Dušková started learning to skate in 2004. She was introduced to the activity at school and then persuaded her mother to let her continue with it.

Competing in ladies' singles, she placed 32nd at the 2014 World Junior Championships in Sofia, Bulgaria. She won the senior bronze medal at the 2015 NRW Trophy.

=== First few seasons with Bidař ===
Dušková and Martin Bidař began skating together as a pair after their coach, Eva Horklová, suggested the idea. Recalling their beginnings, Dušková stated, "It was quite embarrassing at first, because everybody was skating singles and we had to hold hands. We were so young and shy." In the 2011–2012 season, they competed together on the novice national level.

=== 2013–2014 season: Junior international debut ===
Dušková/Bidař's ISU Junior Grand Prix (JGP) debut came in the 2013–2014 season; they finished 8th in September 2013 in Košice, Slovakia, and 6th the next month in Ostrava, Czech Republic. In March 2014, the pair placed 10th at the World Junior Championships in Sofia, Bulgaria, having ranked 10th in both segments.

=== 2014–2015 season ===
In 2014–2015, Dušková/Bidař continued on the JGP series, finishing 10th in Estonia and 8th in Germany. They came in 8th at the 2015 World Junior Championships in Tallinn, Estonia, after placing 9th in both segments.

=== 2015–2016 season: Gold at World Junior Championships ===
Although based mainly in the Czech Republic, Dušková/Bidař also spent some time training in Montreal and Sochi in the summer of 2015 and made another visit to Montreal during the competitive season.

Competing in the 2015 JGP series, Dušková/Bidař won a silver medal in August in Linz, Austria, and finished 4th the following month in Riga, Latvia. The results qualified them for the 2015 JGP Final, held in December 2015 in Barcelona, Spain. Ranked third in the short program and second in the free skate, Dušková/Bidař edged out Russia's Amina Atakhanova / Ilia Spiridonov by 0.33 for the silver medal behind Ekaterina Borisova / Dmitry Sopot, who won gold by a margin of 9.53 points. They became the first Czech pair to step on the podium at a JGP Final.

In February 2016, Dušková/Bidař competed in Hamar, Norway, at the Winter Youth Olympics, placing first in the short program, second in the free skate, and second overall with a total score 2.53 less than Borisova/Sopot. Their silver is the Czech Republic's first Youth Olympic medal in figure skating. In March, Dušková/Bidař won gold at the 2016 World Junior Championships in Debrecen, Hungary. Ranked first in both segments, they outscored two Russian pairs – silver medalists Anastasia Mishina / Vladislav Mirzoev by 9.22 points and bronze medalists Ekaterina Borisova / Dmitry Sopot by 12.82 points – to become the Czech Republic's first World Junior champions in figure skating. They are also the first pair skaters from outside China, Russia, or the United States to win the competition since 2001. On their future plans, Dušková stated that "there will be less and less singles competitions for me. We will concentrate on pairs."

=== 2016–2017 season: Senior debut ===
Ahead of the season, Dušková/Bidař spent three weeks training in Montreal before returning to the Czech Republic. Opening their season on the JGP series, the pair won gold at their September event in Ostrava, ahead of Atakhanova/Spiridonov, and then silver the following month in Dresden, behind Mishina/Mirzoev. Later in October, making their senior international debut, they outscored Miriam Ziegler / Severin Kiefer to win the International Cup of Nice. In December, they placed second to Mishina/Mirzoev at the JGP Final in Marseille.

They placed 7th at the 2017 European Championships in Ostrava, and 14th at the 2017 World Championships in Helsinki.

=== 2017–2018 season: Winter Olympics ===
In September 2017, Dušková/Bidař competed at the Nebelhorn Trophy, the final qualifying opportunity for the 2018 Winter Olympics. The pair placed 9th and earned a spot for the Czech Republic in the pairs' event at the Olympics.

Dušková injured a knee ligament during a warm-up before training in late October and decided later to undergo an operation. As a result, the pair withdrew from their two Grand Prix assignments – the 2017 Cup of China and 2017 Internationaux de France.

Dušková/Bidař returned to competition at the 2018 Winter Olympics in Pyeongchang, South Korea. They qualified to the free skate by placing 15th in the short program and went on to finish 14th overall. Ranked 13th in the short and 11th in the free, the pair finished 11th at the 2018 World Championships in Milan, Italy. On 27 April 2018, they announced that they had parted ways.

== Single skating ==
As a single skater, Dušková made her JGP debut in September 2013, placing 12th at an event in Gdańsk, Poland. She competed at the 2014 World Junior Championships in Sofia, Bulgaria but was eliminated after placing 32nd in the short program. During the 2014–15 season, she placed 10th and 14th at her JGP assignments.

In 2015–16, Dušková was 10th at her JGP event in Toruń, Poland. She made her senior international debut in October, finishing 11th at the 2015 Ondrej Nepela Trophy and 6th at the 2015 Ice Challenge, both of which were part of the ISU Challenger Series (CS). In late November, she won the senior bronze medal at the 2015 NRW Trophy in Dortmund Germany.

== Programs ==
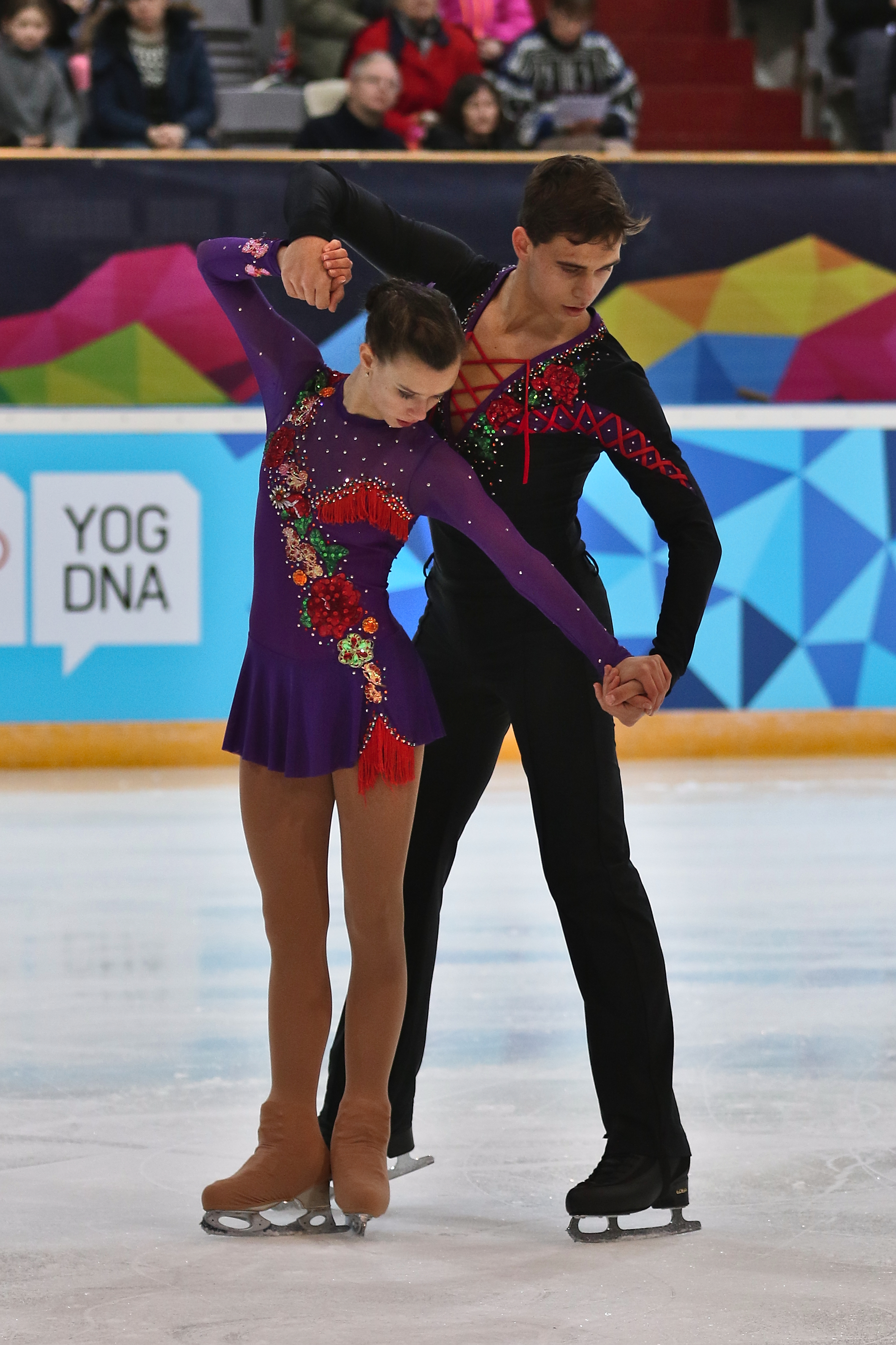
Dušková/Bidař at the 2016 Winter Youth Olympics

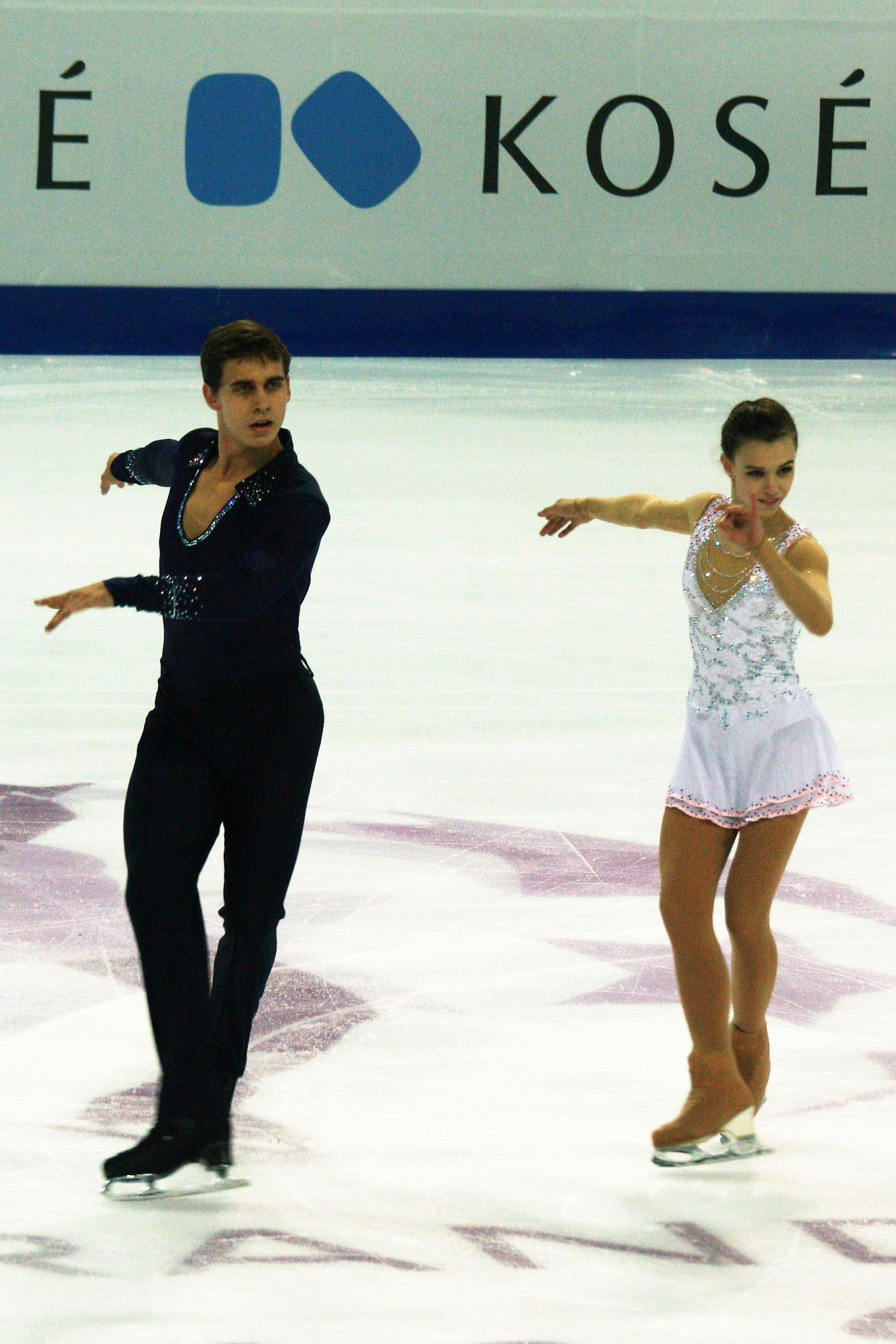
Dušková/Bidař at the 2016–17 Junior Grand Prix Final

=== With Bidař ===
Season	Short program	Free skating	Exhibition
2017–2018	LA 40 (Album: Tango Hereje) performed by The Mozart Tango Players choreo. by Maurizio Margaglio	Cirque du Soleil medley; Once Upon a Time (from La Nouba); La Nouba (from La Nouba); Pearl (from Koozå); Klezmer Moment (from Corteo) choreo. by Rostislav Sinicyn	
2016–2017	LA 40 (Album: Tango Hereje) performed by The Mozart Tango Players choreo. by Maurizio Margaglio	La leyenda del beso by Raúl Di Blasio; Historia de un Amor by Pérez Prado; La leyenda del beso by Raúl Di Blasio	Mamboleo by Mambo Mania
2015–2016	Cirque du Soleil by René Dupéré	La leyenda del beso by Raúl Di Blasio; Historia de un Amor by Pérez Prado; La leyenda del beso by Raúl Di Blasio	Mamboleo by Mambo Mania
2014–2015	Cirque du Soleil by René Dupéré	Burlesque: Jungle Berlin by Joseph L. Altruda; Show Me How You Burlesque; Bound to You	
2013–2014	Italian Street Song by Victor Herbert; Waltz; Italian Street Song by Victor Herbert	Burlesque: Jungle Berlin by Joseph L. Altruda; Show Me How You Burlesque; Bound to You	
2012–2013	Italian Street Song by Victor Herbert; Waltz; Italian Street Song by Victor Herbert	Amélie (soundtrack); Le Banquet by Yann Tiersen	
2011–2012	unknown	Amélie (soundtrack); Le Banquet by Yann Tiersen	

=== Single skating ===
Season	Short program	Free skating
2016–2017	11h11 (from Kurios) by Raphaël Beau, Guy Dubuc, and Marc Lessard	unknown
2014–2016	Larrons En Foire (from Micmacs) by Raphael Beau	Paquita by Édouard Deldevez
2013–2014	Flower Festival in Genzano by Edvard Helsted, Holger Simon Paulli	Gypsy Rhapsody by Tonči Huljić; Sahara by Haylie Ecker; Gypsy Rhapsody by Tonči Huljić

== Competitive highlights ==
GP: Grand Prix; CS: Challenger Series; JGP: Junior Grand Prix

=== With Bidař ===
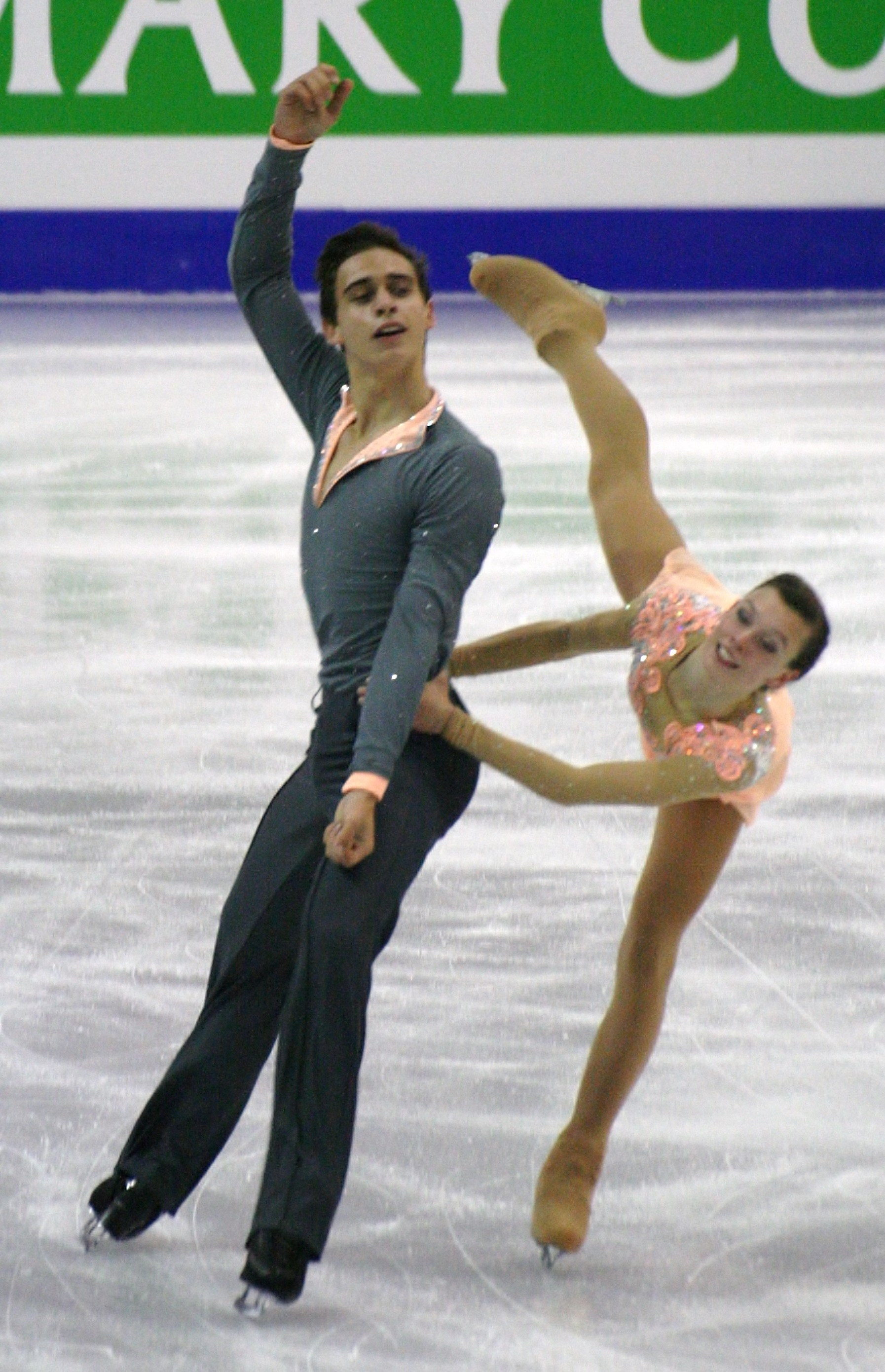
Dušková/Bidař at the 2015–16 Junior Grand Prix Final

International
Event	13–14	14–15	15–16	16–17	17–18
Olympics					14th
Worlds				14th	11th
Europeans				7th	
CS Nebelhorn					9th
Cup of Nice				1st	
International: Junior
Junior Worlds	10th	8th	1st		
Youth Olympics			2nd		
JGP Final			2nd	2nd	
JGP Austria			2nd		
JGP Czech Rep.	6th			1st	
JGP Estonia		10th			
JGP Germany		8th		2nd	
JGP Latvia			4th		
JGP Slovakia	8th				
Ice Challenge		1st	1st		
NRW Trophy		1st	2nd		
National
Czech Champ.	1st J	1st J			
Team events
Youth Olympics			2nd T 2nd P		
WD = Withdrew; T = Team result; P = Personal result. Medals awarded for team result only.

=== Single skating ===
International
Event	13–14	14–15	15–16	16–17
CS Ice Challenge			6th	
CS Lombardia Trophy				19th
CS Nepela Trophy			11th	
NRW Trophy			3rd	
International: Junior
Junior Worlds	32nd			
JGP Croatia		14th		
JGP Czech Republic		10th		
JGP Poland	12th		10th	
EYOF		8th		
Cup of Nice	3rd			
Ice Challenge	2nd	3rd		
National
Czech Champ.			3rd	
Czech Junior Champ.	1st	1st		
Four Nationals			6th	
