= 2016–17 ISU Junior Grand Prix =

- Type: ISU Junior Grand Prix
- Date: August 24 – December 11, 2016
- Season: 2016–17
- Previous: 2015–16 ISU Junior Grand Prix
- Next: 2017–18 ISU Junior Grand Prix

The 2016–17 ISU Junior Grand Prix was the 20th season of a series of junior international competitions organized by the International Skating Union that were held from August 2016 through December 2016. It was the junior-level complement to the 2016–17 ISU Grand Prix of Figure Skating. Medals were awarded in men's singles, women's singles, pair skating, and ice dance. Skaters earned points based on their placement at each event and the top six in each discipline qualified to compete at the 2016–17 Junior Grand Prix Final in Marseille, France.

On 25 August 2016, less than an hour before the start of the ladies' short program at the 2016 JGP France, a shuttle bus was involved in an accident, resulting in injuries to two skaters, Anna Tarusina (from Russia) and Anželika Kļujeva (from Latvia), and their coaches.

== Competitions ==
The locations of the JGP events change yearly. This season, the series was composed of the following events.

Date	Event	Location	Notes	Results
August 24–28	2016 JGP France	Saint-Gervais-les-Bains, France	No pairs	
August 31 – September 4	2016 JGP Czech Republic	Ostrava, Czech Republic		
September 7–11	2016 JGP Japan	Yokohama, Japan	No pairs	
September 14–18	2016 JGP Russia	Saransk, Russia		
September 21–25	2016 JGP Slovenia	Ljubljana, Slovenia	No pairs	
September 28 – October 2	2016 JGP Estonia	Tallinn, Estonia		
October 5–9	2016 JGP Germany	Dresden, Germany		
December 8–11	(France) 2016–17 JGP Final	Marseille, France		

== Entries ==
Skaters who reached the age of 13 by July 1, 2016, but had not turned 19 (singles skaters and female pairs or ice dance skaters) or 21 (male pairs or ice dance skaters) were eligible to compete on the junior circuit. Competitors were chosen by their countries according to their federations' selection procedures. The number of entries allotted to each ISU member federation was determined by their skaters' placements at the 2016 World Junior Championships in each discipline.

== Medalists ==
=== Men's singles ===
Competition	Gold	Silver	Bronze	Results
JGP France	(Russia) Roman Savosin	(Russia) Ilia Skirda	(Japan) Koshiro Shimada	
JGP Czech Republic	(Russia) Dmitri Aliev	(United States) Alexei Krasnozhon	(Russia) Roman Savosin	
JGP Japan	(South Korea) Cha Jun-hwan	(United States) Vincent Zhou	(Russia) Alexey Erokhov	
JGP Russia	(Russia) Alexander Samarin	(United States) Andrew Torgashev	(Czech Republic) Matyáš Bělohradský	
JGP Slovenia	(United States) Alexei Krasnozhon	(Russia) Ilia Skirda	(Japan) Kazuki Tomono	
JGP Estonia	(Russia) Alexander Samarin	(Canada) Roman Sadovsky	(United States) Vincent Zhou	
JGP Germany	(South Korea) Cha Jun-hwan	(Canada) Conrad Orzel	(Japan) Mitsuki Sumoto	
(France) 2016–17 JGP Final	(Russia) Dmitri Aliev	(Russia) Alexander Samarin	(South Korea) Cha Jun-hwan	

=== Ladies' singles ===
Competition	Gold	Silver	Bronze	Results
JGP France	(Russia) Alina Zagitova	(Japan) Kaori Sakamoto	(Japan) Rin Nitaya	
JGP Czech Republic	(Russia) Anastasiia Gubanova	(Japan) Rika Kihira	(Russia) Alisa Lozko	
JGP Japan	(Japan) Kaori Sakamoto	(Japan) Marin Honda	(Japan) Mako Yamashita	
JGP Russia	(Russia) Polina Tsurskaya	(Russia) Stanislava Konstantinova	(Russia) Elizaveta Nugumanova	
JGP Slovenia	(Japan) Rika Kihira	(Japan) Marin Honda	(Russia) Alina Zagitova	
JGP Estonia	(Russia) Polina Tsurskaya	(Russia) Elizaveta Nugumanova	(Japan) Mako Yamashita	
JGP Germany	(Russia) Anastasiia Gubanova	(Japan) Yuna Shiraiwa	(South Korea) Lim Eun-soo	
(France) 2016–17 JGP Final	(Russia) Alina Zagitova	(Russia) Anastasiia Gubanova	(Japan) Kaori Sakamoto	

=== Pairs ===
Competition	Gold	Silver	Bronze	Results
JGP Czech Republic	(Czech Republic) Anna Dušková / Martin Bidař	(Russia) Amina Atakhanova / Ilia Spiridonov	(United States) Chelsea Liu / Brian Johnson	
JGP Russia	(Russia) Anastasia Mishina / Vladislav Mirzoev	(Russia) Aleksandra Boikova / Dmitrii Kozlovskii	(Russia) Ekaterina Borisova / Dmitry Sopot	
JGP Estonia	(Australia) Ekaterina Alexandrovskaya / Harley Windsor	(Russia) Alina Ustimkina / Nikita Volodin	(Russia) Ekaterina Borisova / Dmitry Sopot	
JGP Germany	(Russia) Anastasia Mishina / Vladislav Mirzoev	(Czech Republic) Anna Dušková / Martin Bidař	(Russia) Alina Ustimkina / Nikita Volodin	
(France) 2016–17 JGP Final	(Russia) Anastasia Mishina / Vladislav Mirzoev	(Czech Republic) Anna Dušková / Martin Bidař	(Russia) Aleksandra Boikova / Dmitrii Kozlovskii	

=== Ice dance ===
Competition	Gold	Silver	Bronze	Results
JGP France	(France) Angélique Abachkina / Louis Thauron	(United States) Christina Carreira / Anthony Ponomarenko	(Russia) Sofia Polishchuk / Alexander Vakhnov	
JGP Czech Republic	(United States) Lorraine McNamara / Quinn Carpenter	(Czech Republic) Nicole Kuzmich / Alexandr Sinicyn	(Russia) Arina Ushakova / Maxim Nekrasov	
JGP Japan	(United States) Rachel Parsons / Michael Parsons	(Russia) Anastasia Shpilevaya / Grigory Smirnov	(France) Angélique Abachkina / Louis Thauron	
JGP Russia	(Russia) Alla Loboda / Pavel Drozd	(United States) Christina Carreira / Anthony Ponomarenko	(Russia) Sofia Shevchenko / Igor Eremenko	
JGP Slovenia	(United States) Lorraine McNamara / Quinn Carpenter	(Russia) Sofia Polishchuk / Alexander Vakhnov	(Russia) Anastasia Skoptsova / Kirill Aleshin	
JGP Estonia	(Russia) Alla Loboda / Pavel Drozd	(Russia) Anastasia Skoptsova / Kirill Aleshin	(United States) Chloe Lewis / Logan Bye	
JGP Germany	(United States) Rachel Parsons / Michael Parsons	(Russia) Anastasia Shpilevaya / Grigory Smirnov	(Russia) Arina Ushakova / Maxim Nekrasov	
(France) 2016–17 JGP Final	(United States) Rachel Parsons / Michael Parsons	(Russia) Alla Loboda / Pavel Drozd	(United States) Lorraine McNamara / Quinn Carpenter	

== Overall standings ==
=== Medal standings ===
Rank	Nation	Gold	Silver	Bronze	Total
1	Russia (RUS)	16	14	14	44
2	United States (USA)	6	5	4	15
3	Japan (JPN)	2	5	7	14
4	South Korea (KOR)	2	0	2	4
5	Czech Republic (CZE)	1	3	1	5
6	France (FRA)	1	0	1	2
7	Australia (AUS)	1	0	0	1
8	Canada (CAN)	0	2	0	2
Totals (8 entries)		29	29	29	87

=== Standings per nation ===
Starting in the 2015–16 season, the ISU added standings per nation. Points were calculated for each discipline separately before being combined for a total score per nation. For each discipline, each nation combined the points from up to four JGP events. A country did not have to use the same events for each discipline (e.g. a country can combine points from JGP events in France, Japan, Russia, and Slovenia for pairs while using Czech Republic, Japan, Estonia, and Germany for ice dance). For each discipline at each event, each nation combined the points from up to two skaters/teams. The points that each skater/team earned is based on placement. Placement to point conversion was the same as for qualification, with first place earning 15 points, second earning 13 points, etc. In the event ties in the total scores, the country with the fewer skaters/teams (only counting skaters/teams from whom points were combined), won the tie breaker. If the tie was not broken, the nations would have the same rank.

The current standings were:

No.	Nation	Men	Ladies	Pairs	Ice dance	Total
1	Russia	100	106	100	102	408
2	United States	64	22	31	69	186
3	Japan	44	102	3	5	154
4	Canada	40	11	26	46	123
5	France	15	10	0	58	83
6	Czech Republic	17	6	28	22	73
7	South Korea	33	36	3	0	72
8	Ukraine	27	0	5	19	51
9	China	10	0	21	0	31
10	Australia	0	0	18	0	18

== Qualification ==
At each event, skaters earned points toward qualification for the Junior Grand Prix Final. Following the seventh event, the top six highest-scoring skaters/teams advanced to the Final. The points earned per placement were as follows.

Placement	Singles	Pairs/Ice dance
1st	15	15
2nd	13	13
3rd	11	11
4th	9	9
5th	7	7
6th	5	5
7th	4	4
8th	3	3
9th	2	—N/a
10th	1	—N/a

There were originally seven tie-breakers in cases of a tie in overall points:

1. Highest placement at an event. If a skater placed 1st and 3rd, the tiebreaker is the 1st place, and that beats a skater who placed 2nd in both events.
2. Highest combined total scores in both events. If a skater earned 200 points at one event and 250 at a second, that skater would win in the second tie-break over a skater who earned 200 points at one event and 150 at another.
3. Participated in two events.
4. Highest combined scores in the free skating/free dance portion of both events.
5. Highest individual score in the free skating/free dance portion from one event.
6. Highest combined scores in the short program/short dance of both events.
7. Highest number of total participants at the events.

If a tie remained, it was considered unbreakable and the tied skaters all advanced to the Junior Grand Prix Final.

=== Qualifiers ===
No.	Men	Ladies	Pairs	Ice dance
1	(Russia) Alexander Samarin	(Russia) Anastasiia Gubanova	(Russia) Anastasia Mishina / Vladislav Mirzoev	(Russia) Alla Loboda / Pavel Drozd
2	(South Korea) Cha Jun-hwan	(Russia) ~~Polina Tsurskaya~~ (withdrew)	(Czech Republic) Anna Dušková / Martin Bidař	(United States) Rachel Parsons / Michael Parsons
3	(United States) Alexei Krasnozhon	(Japan) Rika Kihira	(Russia) Alina Ustimkina / Nikita Volodin	(United States) Lorraine McNamara / Quinn Carpenter
4	(Russia) Roman Savosin	(Japan) Kaori Sakamoto	(Russia) Amina Atakhanova / Ilia Spiridonov	(France) Angélique Abachkina / Louis Thauron
5	(Russia) Ilia Skirda	(Russia) Alina Zagitova	(Russia) Aleksandra Boikova / Dmitrii Kozlovskii	(United States) Christina Carreira / Anthony Ponomarenko
6	(Russia) Dmitri Aliev	(Japan) Marin Honda	(Russia) ~~Ekaterina Borisova / Dmitry Sopot~~ (withdrew)	(Russia) Anastasia Shpilevaya / Grigory Smirnov

Alternates

No.	Men	Ladies	Pairs	Ice dance
1	(United States) Vincent Zhou	(Russia) Elizaveta Nugumanova (called up)	(Australia) Ekaterina Alexandrovskaya / Harley Windsor (called up)	(Russia) Anastasia Skoptcova / Kirill Aleshin
2	(United States) Andrew Torgashev	(Russia) Stanislava Konstantinova	(United States) Chelsea Liu / Brian Johnson	(Russia) Sofia Polishchuk / Alexander Vakhnov
3	(Canada) Roman Sadovsky	(Japan) Yuna Shiraiwa	(Canada) Lori-Ann Matte / Thierry Ferland	(Czech Republic) Nicole Kuzmich / Alexandr Sinicyn

== Top scores ==
=== Men's singles ===
Top 10 best scores in the men's combined total
No.	Skater	Nation	Score	Event
1	Dmitri Aliev	Russia	240.07	2016–17 JGP Final
2	Cha Jun-hwan	South Korea	239.47	2016 JGP Japan
3	Alexander Samarin	Russia	236.52	2016–17 JGP Final
4	Vincent Zhou	United States	226.39	2016 JGP Japan
5	Alexei Krasnozhon	United States	223.60	2016 JGP Czech Republic
6	Roman Sadovsky	Canada	221.21	2016 JGP Estonia
7	Alexey Erokhov	Russia	216.91	2016 JGP Japan
8	Roman Savosin	Russia	212.39	2016–17 JGP Final
9	Kazuki Tomono	Japan	212.04	2016 JGP Japan
10	Artem Kovalev	Russia	209.01	2016 JGP Japan

Top 10 best scores in the men's short program
No.	Skater	Nation	Score	Event
1	Dmitri Aliev	Russia	81.37	2016–17 JGP Final
2	Alexander Samarin	Russia	81.08	2016–17 JGP Final
3	Vincent Zhou	United States	80.53	2016 JGP Japan
4	Cha Jun-hwan	South Korea	79.34	2016 JGP Japan
5	Alexei Krasnozhon	United States	75.10	2016 JGP Czech Republic
6	Alexey Erokhov	Russia	74.90	2016 JGP Japan
7	Andrew Torgashev	United States	73.48	2016 JGP Germany
8	Roman Savosin	Russia	72.98	2016–17 JGP Final
9	Koshiro Shimada	Japan	70.48	2016 JGP Estonia
10	Joseph Phan	Canada	70.33	2016 JGP Slovenia

Top 10 best scores in the men's free skating
No.	Skater	Nation	Score	Event
1	Alexander Samarin	Russia	160.93	2016 JGP Estonia
2	Cha Jun-hwan	South Korea	160.13	2016 JGP Japan
3	Dmitri Aliev	Russia	158.70	2016–17 JGP Final
4	Roman Sadovsky	Canada	149.25	2016 JGP Estonia
5	Alexei Krasnozhon	United States	148.50	2016 JGP Czech Republic
6	Vincent Zhou	United States	145.86	2016 JGP Japan
7	Kazuki Tomono	Japan	145.57	2016 JGP Japan
8	Alexey Erokhov	Russia	142.01	2016 JGP Japan
9	Andrew Torgashev	United States	139.44	2016 JGP Russia
10	Roman Savosin	Russia	139.41	2016–17 JGP Final

=== Ladies' singles ===
Top 10 best scores in the ladies' combined total
No.	Skater	Nation	Score	Event
1	Alina Zagitova	Russia	207.43	2016–17 JGP Final
2	Anastasiia Gubanova	Russia	194.57	2016 JGP Germany
3	Rika Kihira	Japan	194.24	2016 JGP Slovenia
4	Polina Tsurskaya	Russia	194.02	2016 JGP Estonia
5	Elizaveta Nugumanova	Russia	188.43	2016 JGP Estonia
6	Kaori Sakamoto	Japan	187.81	2016 JGP Japan
7	Marin Honda	Japan	184.11	2016 JGP Japan
8	Mako Yamashita	Japan	184.06	2016 JGP Estonia
9	Sofia Samodurova	Russia	180.69	2016 JGP Japan
10	Yuna Shiraiwa	Japan	176.66	2016 JGP Germany

Top 10 best scores in the ladies' short program
No.	Skater	Nation	Score	Event
1	Alina Zagitova	Russia	70.92	2016–17 JGP Final
2	Polina Tsurskaya	Russia	69.02	2016 JGP Russia
3	Rika Kihira	Japan	66.78	2016 JGP Czech Republic
4	Kaori Sakamoto	Japan	65.66	2016 JGP Japan
5	Anastasiia Gubanova	Russia	65.43	2016 JGP Germany
6	Mako Yamashita	Japan	64.86	2016 JGP Japan
7	Stanislava Konstantinova	Russia	64.38	2016 JGP Russia
8	Lim Eun-soo	South Korea	63.83	2016 JGP Germany
9	Elizaveta Nugumanova	Russia	62.41	2016 JGP Estonia
10	Alisa Fedichkina	Russia	61.13	2016 JGP Japan

Top 10 best scores in the ladies' free skating
No.	Skater	Nation	Score	Event
1	Alina Zagitova	Russia	136.51	2016–17 JGP Final
2	Anastasiia Gubanova	Russia	133.77	2016–17 JGP Final
3	Marin Honda	Japan	128.64	2016 JGP Japan
4	Rika Kihira	Japan	128.31	2016 JGP Slovenia
5	Polina Tsurskaya	Russia	127.30	2016 JGP Estonia
6	Elizaveta Nugumanova	Russia	126.02	2016 JGP Estonia
7	Kaori Sakamoto	Japan	122.15	2016 JGP Japan
8	Yuna Shiraiwa	Japan	122.06	2016 JGP Germany
9	Mako Yamashita	Japan	121.41	2016 JGP Estonia
10	Sofia Samodurova	Russia	119.93	2016 JGP Japan

=== Pairs ===
Top 10 best scores in the pairs' combined total
No.	Team	Nation	Score	Event
1	Anastasia Mishina / Vladislav Mirzoev	Russia	180.63	2016–17 JGP Final
2	Anna Dušková / Martin Bidař	Czech Republic	167.76	2016–17 JGP Final
3	Amina Atakhanova / Ilia Spiridonov	Russia	159.94	2016 JGP Czech Republic
4	Aleksandra Boikova / Dmitrii Kozlovskii	Russia	159.72	2016–17 JGP Final
5	Ekaterina Alexandrovskaya / Harley Windsor	Australia	159.26	2016 JGP Estonia
6	Alina Ustimkina / Nikita Volodin	Russia	158.14	2016–17 JGP Final
7	Ekaterina Borisova / Dmitry Sopot	Russia	150.76	2016 JGP Russia
8	Chelsea Liu / Brian Johnson	United States	147.14	2016 JGP Estonia
9	Evelyn Walsh / Trennt Michaud	Canada	143.92	2016 JGP Germany
10	Anastasia Poluianova / Maksim Selkin	Russia	143.02	2016 JGP Czech Republic

Top 10 best scores in the pairs' short program
No.	Team	Nation	Score	Event
1	Amina Atakhanova / Ilia Spiridonov	Russia	64.79	2016 JGP Estonia
2	Anastasia Mishina / Vladislav Mirzoev	Russia	64.73	2016–17 JGP Final
3	Anna Dušková / Martin Bidař	Czech Republic	62.94	2016 JGP Czech Republic
4	Aleksandra Boikova / Dmitrii Kozlovskii	Russia	60.39	2016 JGP Russia
5	Alina Ustimkina / Nikita Volodin	Russia	59.34	2016 JGP Germany
6	Ekaterina Alexandrovskaya / Harley Windsor	Australia	57.08	2016–17 JGP Final
7	Ekaterina Borisova / Dmitry Sopot	Russia	56.34	2016 JGP Estonia
8	Chelsea Liu / Brian Johnson	United States	55.46	2016 JGP Estonia
9	Gao Yumeng / Xie Zhong	China	52.24	2016 JGP Russia
10	Anastasia Poluianova / Maksim Selkin	Russia	50.38	2016 JGP Czech Republic

Top 10 best scores in the pairs' free skating
No.	Team	Nation	Score	Event
1	Anastasia Mishina / Vladislav Mirzoev	Russia	115.90	2016–17 JGP Final
2	Anna Dušková / Martin Bidař	Czech Republic	106.93	2016 JGP Germany
3	Amina Atakhanova / Ilia Spiridonov	Russia	104.71	2016 JGP Czech Republic
4	Ekaterina Alexandrovskaya / Harley Windsor	Australia	102.28	2016 JGP Estonia
5	Aleksandra Boikova / Dmitrii Kozlovskii	Russia	100.97	2016–17 JGP Final
6	Alina Ustimkina / Nikita Volodin	Russia	99.64	2016 JGP Estonia
7	Ekaterina Borisova / Dmitry Sopot	Russia	96.02	2016 JGP Russia
8	Evelyn Walsh / Trennt Michaud	Canada	94.90	2016 JGP Germany
9	Chelsea Liu / Brian Johnson	United States	94.56	2016 JGP Czech Republic
10	Anastasia Poluianova / Maksim Selkin	Russia	92.64	2016 JGP Czech Republic

=== Ice dance ===
Top 10 best scores in the combined total (ice dance)
No.	Team	Nation	Score	Event
1	Rachel Parsons / Michael Parsons	United States	162.50	2016–17 JGP Final
2	Alla Loboda / Pavel Drozd	Russia	161.87	2016 JGP Russia
2	Alla Loboda / Pavel Drozd	Russia	161.87	2016–17 JGP Final
3	Lorraine McNamara / Quinn Carpenter	United States	159.30	2016 JGP Czech Republic
4	Christina Carreira / Anthony Ponomarenko	United States	157.19	2016 JGP Russia
5	Angélique Abachkina / Louis Thauron	France	152.17	2016 JGP France
6	Anastasia Shpilevaya / Grigory Smirnov	Russia	151.50	2016 JGP Japan
7	Anastasia Skoptcova / Kirill Aleshin	Russia	148.45	2016 JGP Estonia
8	Sofia Polishchuk / Alexander Vakhnov	Russia	144.76	2016 JGP Slovenia
9	Nicole Kuzmich / Alexandr Sinicyn	Czech Republic	142.69	2016 JGP Czech Republic
10	Sofia Shevchenko / Igor Eremenko	Russia	141.67	2016 JGP Russia

Top 10 best scores in the short dance
No.	Team	Nation	Score	Event
1	Alla Loboda / Pavel Drozd	Russia	67.58	2016–17 JGP Final
2	Rachel Parsons / Michael Parsons	United States	66.91	2016–17 JGP Final
3	Lorraine McNamara / Quinn Carpenter	United States	66.60	2016 JGP Czech Republic
4	Christina Carreira / Anthony Ponomarenko	United States	63.10	2016 JGP Russia
5	Anastasia Skoptcova / Kirill Aleshin	Russia	62.53	2016 JGP Estonia
6	Angélique Abachkina / Louis Thauron	France	61.11	2016 JGP France
7	Anastasia Shpilevaya / Grigory Smirnov	Russia	61.00	2016 JGP Germany
8	Sofia Shevchenko / Igor Eremenko	Russia	57.88	2016 JGP Russia
9	Marjorie Lajoie / Zachary Lagha	Canada	57.32	2016 JGP Germany
10	Arina Ushakova / Maxim Nekrasov	Russia	57.13	2016 JGP Germany

Top 10 best scores in the free dance
No.	Team	Nation	Score	Event
1	Alla Loboda / Pavel Drozd	Russia	96.91	2016 JGP Russia
2	Rachel Parsons / Michael Parsons	United States	95.59	2016–17 JGP Final
3	Christina Carreira / Anthony Ponomarenko	United States	94.09	2016 JGP Russia
4	Lorraine McNamara / Quinn Carpenter	United States	92.70	2016 JGP Czech Republic
5	Angélique Abachkina / Louis Thauron	France	91.06	2016 JGP France
6	Anastasia Shpilevaya / Grigory Smirnov	Russia	90.62	2016 JGP Japan
7	Sofia Polishchuk / Alexander Vakhnov	Russia	89.16	2016 JGP Slovenia
8	Nicole Kuzmich / Alexandr Sinicyn	Czech Republic	87.10	2016 JGP Czech Republic
9	Anastasia Skoptcova / Kirill Aleshin	Russia	86.96	2016 JGP Slovenia
10	Sofia Shevchenko / Igor Eremenko	Russia	83.79	2016 JGP Russia
