= Ilia Spiridonov =

Russian pair skater (born 1998)

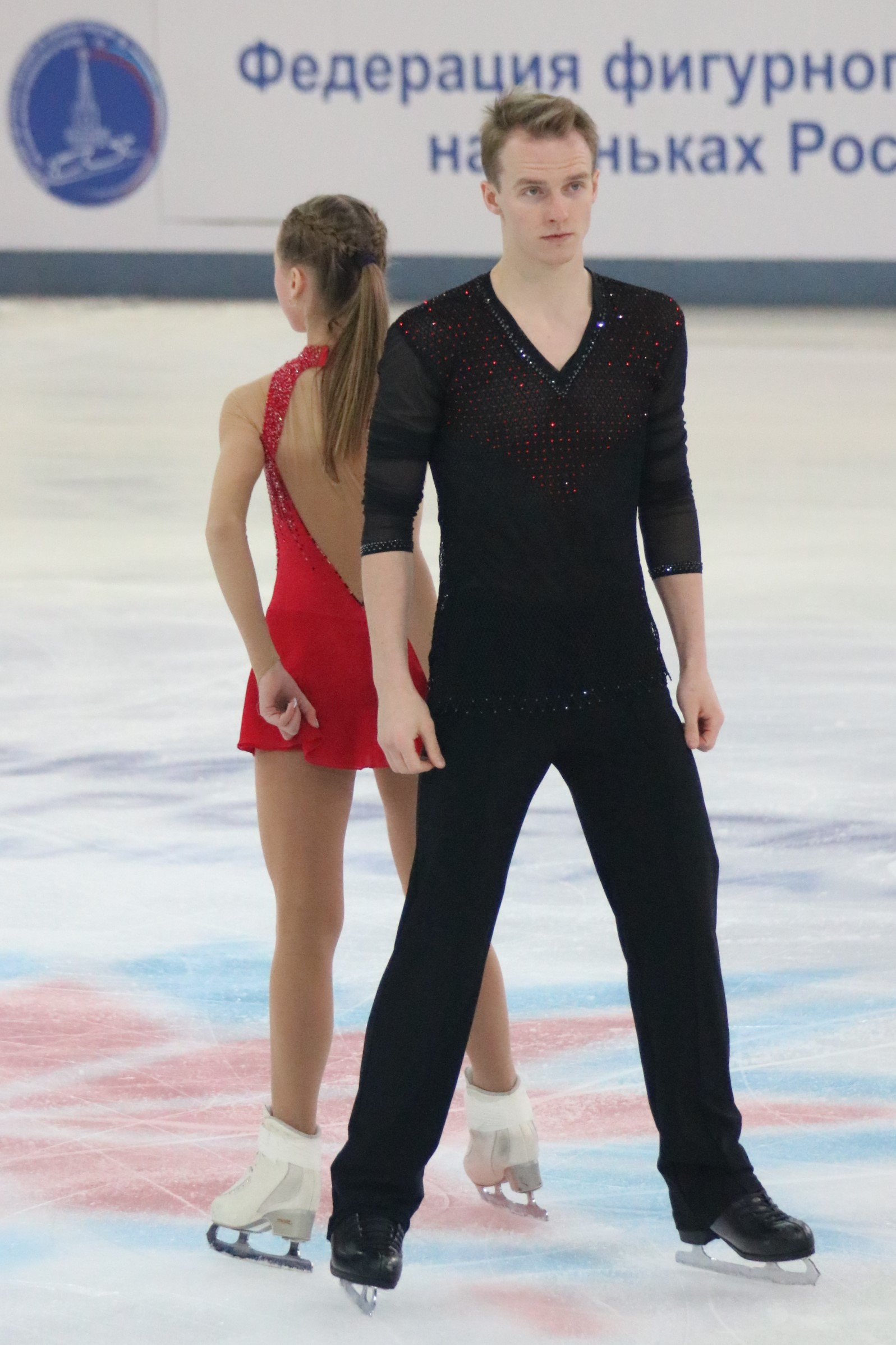

Personal information
- Native name: Илья Романович Спиридонов
- Full name: Ilia Romanovich Spiridonov
- Born: 5 February 1998 (age 28) Kazan, Tatarstan, Russia
- Height: 1.79 m (5 ft 10 1/2 in)

Figure skating career
- Country: Russia
- Partner: Maria Pavlova
- Coach: Nodari Maisuradze, Artur Dmitriev
- Skating club: UOR 4 Moscow
- Began skating: 2002
Medal record
Representing Russia
Figure skating: Pairs
Junior Grand Prix Final
Bronze medal – third place	2015–16 Barcelona	Pairs

Ilia Romanovich Spiridonov (Russian: Илья Романович Спиридонов; born 5 February 1998) is a Russian pair skater. With former partner Amina Atakhanova, he is the 2015–16 JGP Final bronze medalist.

== Career ==
=== Early years ===
Spiridonov began skating in 2002. He and Amina Atakhanova began competing together in December 2014, coached by Natalia Pavlova and Alexander Zaitsev in Moscow.

=== 2015–2016 season ===
Atakhanova/Spiridonov's international debut came in September 2015, at the 2015 Junior Grand Prix (JGP) competition in Linz, Austria. Ranked first in both segments, the pair won gold by a margin of 3.79 points over the Czech Republic's Anna Dušková / Martin Bidař. At their second JGP assignment, in Toruń, Poland, they were awarded the silver medal behind Ekaterina Borisova / Dmitry Sopot of Russia. These results qualified Atakhanova/Spiridonov for the 2015–16 JGP Final in Barcelona, Spain, where they won the bronze medal behind Borisova/Sopot and Dušková/Bidař.

At the 2016 Russian Junior Championships, Atakhanova/Spiridonov won the silver medal behind Anastasia Mishina / Vladislav Mirzoev. They were selected to compete at the 2016 World Junior Championships, in Debrecen, Hungary, but withdrew before the start of the competition due to an injury to Atakhanova.

=== 2016–2017 season ===
During the 2016 JGP series, Atakhanova/Spiridonov won silver in the Czech Republic and placed fourth in Estonia. Finishing fourth in the JGP rankings, they qualified to the JGP Final in Marseille, France, where they would place sixth. Ranked 8th in the short and first in the free, they finished fourth overall at the 2017 World Junior Championships in Taipei, Taiwan. They received a small gold medal for their free skate.

Pavlova and Zaitsev coached Atakhanova/Spiridonov in Moscow. The skaters ended their partnership following the season.

=== Partnership with Kudriavtseva ===
Spiridonov teamed up with Lina Kudriavtseva in 2017. They made their competitive debut in November 2017, at a Russian Cup event. They were coached by Natalia Pavlova before switching to Nodari Maisuradze and Artur Dmitriev. At their first international event, the 2018 CS Ondrej Nepela Trophy, they took the bronze medal.

== Records and achievements ==
- Set the junior-level pairs' record for the short program to 64.79 points at the 2016–17 ISU Junior Grand Prix competition in Tallinn, Estonia.

== Programs ==
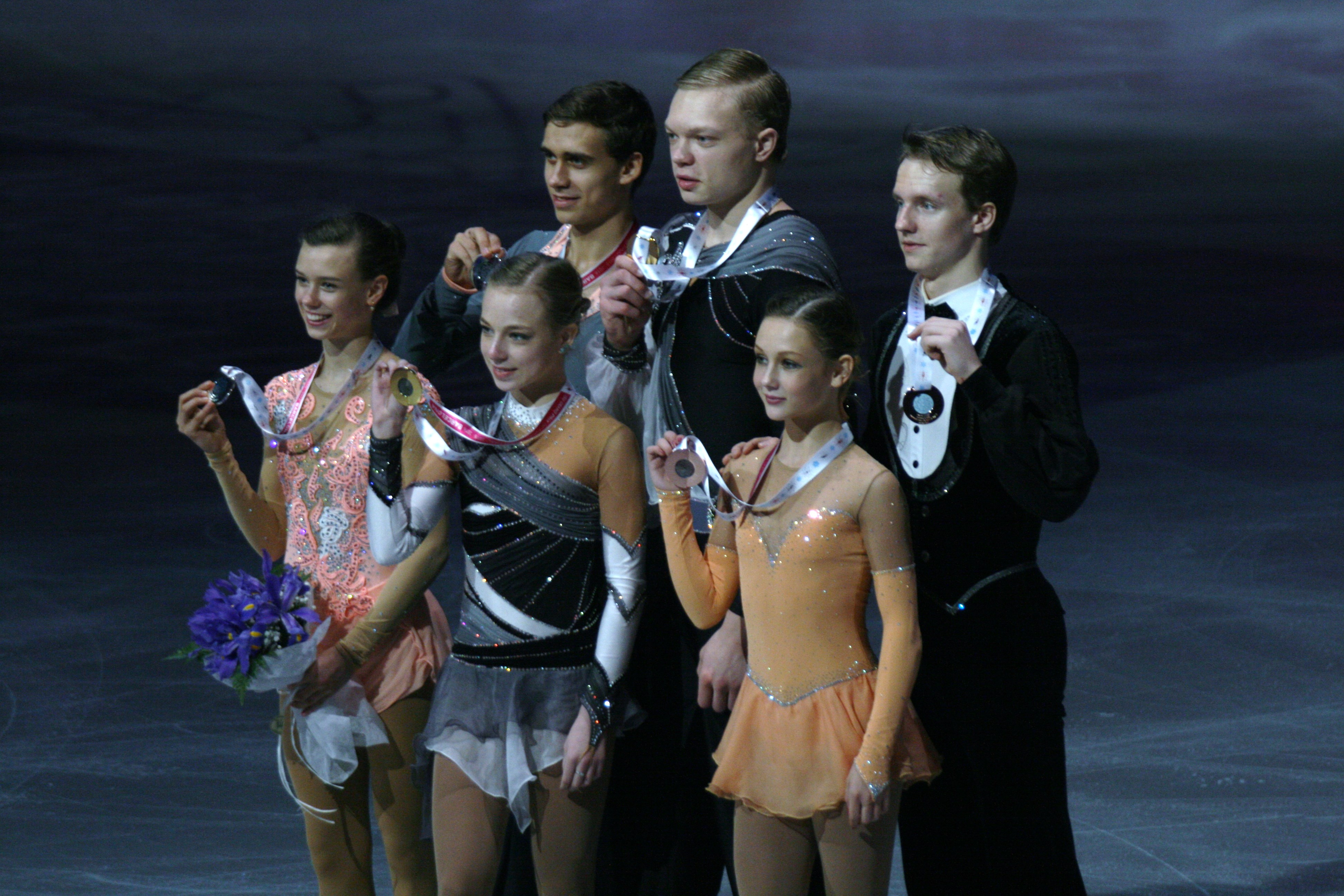
Atakhanova/Spiridonov at the 2015–16 Junior Grand Prix Final pairs' medal ceremony

=== With Kudriavtseva ===
Season	Short program	Free skating
2018–2019	Call Out My Name by The Weeknd choreo. by Sergei Komolov	Torn by Nathan Lanier choreo. by Sergei Komolov
2017–2018	Down by Marian Hill	Die Fledermaus: Overture by Johann Strauss II

=== With Atakhanova ===
Season	Short program	Free skating
2016–2017	Jimmy, Renda-se by Tom Zé	Singin' in the Rain by Gene Kelly
2015–2016	The Nutcracker by Pyotr Ilyich Tchaikovsky (modern arrangement)	Funny Girl by Jule Styne; Anchors Aweigh; Roller Skate Rag; Gigi by Frederick Loewe
2014–2015	Come Di by Paolo Conte	Funny Girl by Jule Styne; Anchors Aweigh; Roller Skate Rag; Gigi by Frederick Loewe

== Competitive highlights ==
CS: Challenger Series; JGP: Junior Grand Prix

=== With Kudriavtseva ===
International
Event	2018–19	2019–20
CS Ondrej Nepela Trophy	3rd	
Denis Ten Memorial		1st
National
Russian Championships	9th	
TBD = Assigned; WD = Withdrew

=== With Atakhanova ===
International
Event	2015–16	2016–17
Junior Worlds	WD	4th
JGP Final	3rd	6th
JGP Austria	1st	
JGP Czech Republic		2nd
JGP Estonia		4th
JGP Poland	2nd	
National
Russian Jr. Champ.	2nd	2nd
TBD = Assigned; WD = Withdrew

== Detailed results ==
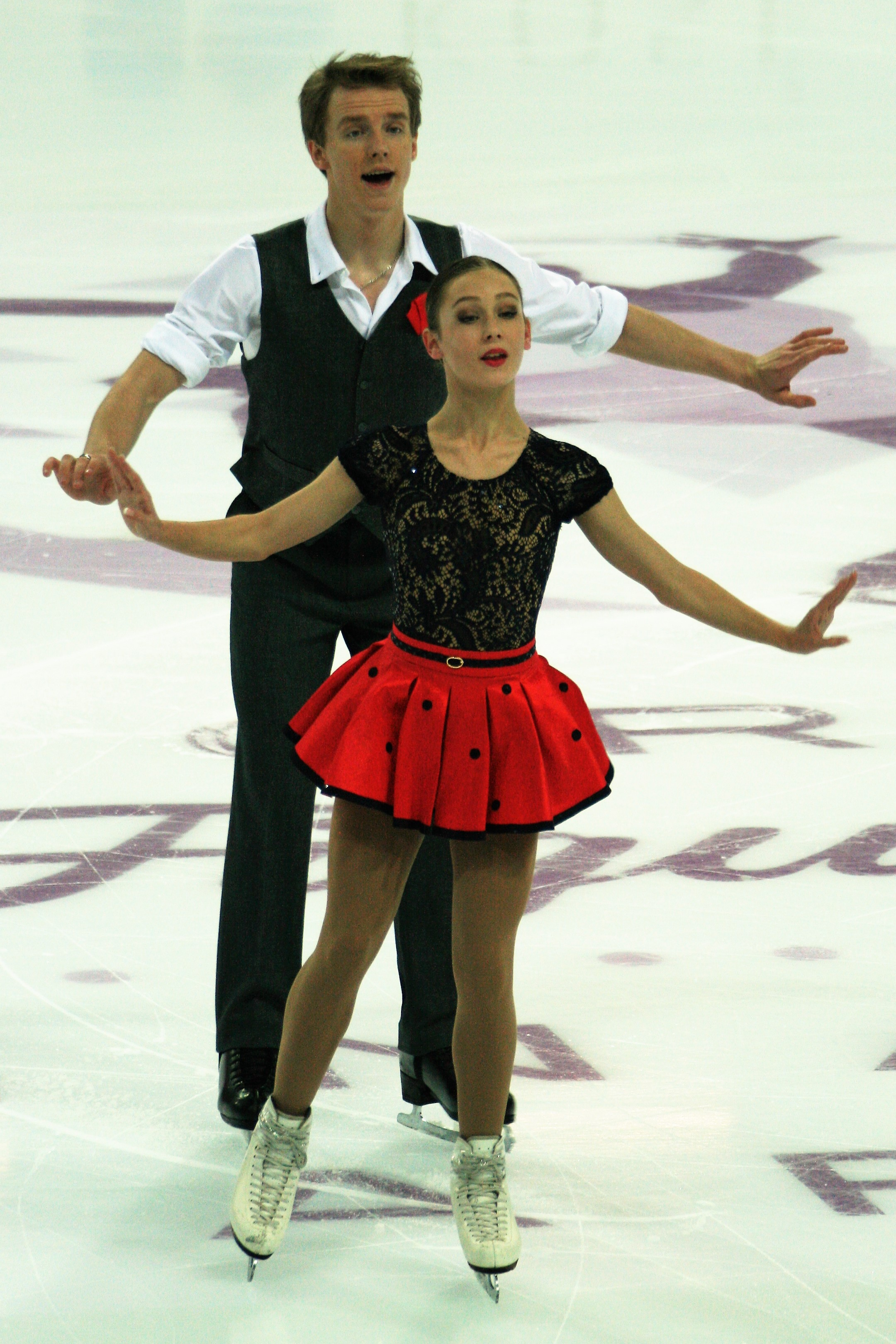
Atakhanova/Spiridonov at the 2016−17 Junior Grand Prix Final.

Small medals for short and free programs awarded only at ISU Championships.

=== With Kudriavtseva ===
2019–20 season
Date	Event	SP	FS	Total
9–12 October 2019	2019 Denis Ten Memorial Challenge	1; 67.70	2; 97.57	1; 165.27
2018–19 season
Date	Event	SP	FS	Total
19–23 December 2018	2019 Russian Championships	7; 67.86	10; 114.83	9; 182.69
19–22 September 2018	2018 CS Ondrej Nepela Trophy	2; 62.69	4; 94.43	3; 157.12

=== With Atakhanova ===
2016–17 season
Date	Event	Level	SP	FS	Total
15–19 March 2017	2017 World Junior Championships	Junior	8; 50.20	1; 107.56	4; 157.76
1–5 February 2017	2017 Russian Junior Championships	Junior	1; 67.41	3; 108.76	2; 176.17
8–11 December 2016	2016−17 JGP Final	Junior	6; 56.78	6; 82.72	6; 139.50
28 September – 2 October 2016	2016 JGP Estonia	Junior	1; 64.79	7; 83.01	4; 147.80
31 August – 4 September 2016	2016 JGP Czech Republic	Junior	2; 55.23	1; 104.71	2; 159.94
2015–16 season
Date	Event	Level	SP	FS	Total
14–20 March 2016	2016 World Junior Championships	Junior			WD
19–23 January 2016	2016 Russian Junior Championships	Junior	3; 61.87	2; 115.08	2; 176.95
10–13 December 2015	2015−16 JGP Final	Junior	2; 58.58	3; 103.42	3; 162.00
23–27 September 2015	2015 JGP Poland	Junior	1; 59.70	4; 89.82	2; 149.52
9–13 September 2015	2015 JGP Austria	Junior	1; 56.11	1; 106.39	1; 162.50
