= 2016 Russian Figure Skating Championships =

- Type: National championship
- Date: 23–27 December 2015 (S); 21–23 January 2016 (J)
- Season: 2015–16
- Location: Yekaterinburg (S); Chelyabinsk (J)
- Host: Figure Skating Federation of Russia
- Venue: KRK Uralets

Champions
- Men's singles: Maxim Kovtun (S); Dmitri Aliev (J)
- Ladies' singles: Evgenia Medvedeva (S); Polina Tsurskaya (J)
- Pairs: Tatiana Volosozhar / Maxim Trankov (S); Anastasia Mishina / Vladislav Mirzoev (J)
- Ice dance: Ekaterina Bobrova / Dmitri Soloviev (S); Alla Loboda / Pavel Drozd (J)
- Previous: 2015 Russian Championships
- Next: 2017 Russian Championships

The 2016 Russian Figure Skating Championships (Russian: Чемпионат России по фигурному катанию на коньках 2016) were held from 23 to 27 December 2015 in Yekaterinburg, Sverdlovsk Oblast. Medals were awarded in the disciplines of men's singles, ladies' singles, pair skating, and ice dancing. The results were part of the selection criteria for Russia's teams sent to the 2016 World Championships and 2016 European Championships.

== Competitions ==
In the 2015–16 season, Russian skaters competed in domestic qualifying events and national championships for various age levels. The Russian Cup series led to three events – the Russian Championships, the Russian Junior Championships, and the Russian Cup Final.

Date	Event	Type	Location	Details
17–21 September 2015	1st stage of Russian Cup	Qualifier	Samara, Samara Oblast	Details
8–12 October 2015	2nd stage of Russian Cup	Qualifier	Yoshkar-Ola, Mari El	Details
27–31 October 2015	3rd stage of Russian Cup	Qualifier	Yekaterinburg, Sverdlovsk Oblast	Details
12–16 November 2015	4th stage of Russian Cup	Qualifier	Kazan, Tatarstan	Details
2–6 December 2015	5th stage of Russian Cup	Qualifier	Moscow	Details
23–27 December 2015	2016 Russian Championships	Final	Yekaterinburg, Sverdlovsk Oblast	Details
21–23 January 2016	2016 Russian Junior Championships	Final	Chelyabinsk, Chelyabinsk Oblast	Details
16–20 February 2016	2016 Russian Cup Final	Final	Saransk, Mordovia	Details
4–7 March 2016	2016 Russian Youth Championships – Younger Age	Final	Stary Oskol, Belgorod Oblast	Details
1–4 April 2016	2016 Russian Youth Championships – Elder Age	Final	Veliky Novgorod, Novgorod Oblast	Details

== Medalists of most important competitions ==
Senior Championships
Discipline	Gold	Silver	Bronze
Men	Maxim Kovtun	Mikhail Kolyada	Alexander Petrov
Ladies	Evgenia Medvedeva	Elena Radionova	Anna Pogorilaya
Pairs	Tatiana Volosozhar / Maxim Trankov	Yuko Kavaguti / Alexander Smirnov	Evgenia Tarasova / Vladimir Morozov
Ice dancing	Ekaterina Bobrova / Dmitri Soloviev	Victoria Sinitsina / Nikita Katsalapov	Alexandra Stepanova / Ivan Bukin
Junior Championships
Discipline	Gold	Silver	Bronze
Men	Dmitri Aliev	Alexander Samarin	Roman Savosin
Ladies	Polina Tsurskaya	Maria Sotskova	Alisa Fedichkina
Pairs	Anastasia Mishina / Vladislav Mirzoev	Amina Atakhanova / Ilia Spiridonov	Ekaterina Borisova / Dmitry Sopot
Ice dancing	Alla Loboda / Pavel Drozd	Betina Popova / Yuri Vlasenko	Anastasia Shpilevaya / Grigory Smirnov
Cup Final
Discipline	Gold	Silver	Bronze
Men	Artur Dmitriev Jr.	Alexander Samarin	Sergei Voronov
Ladies	Alena Leonova	Yulia Lipnitskaya	Serafima Sakhanovich
Pairs	Vera Bazarova / Andrei Deputat	Alisa Efimova / Alexander Korovin	Sofia Biryukova / Andrei Filonov
Ice dancing	Tiffany Zahorski / Jonathan Guerreiro	Ludmila Sosnitskaia / Pavel Golovishnikov	Anastasia Safronova / Ilia Zimin
Junior men	Roman Savosin	Artem Kovalev	Evgeni Ilyn
Junior ladies	Stanislava Konstantinova	Anna Tarusina	Alisa Fedichkina
Junior pairs	Amina Atakhanova / Ilia Spiridonov	Anastasia Poluianova / Stepan Korotkov	Albina Sokur / Roman Pleshkov
Junior ice dancing	Alla Loboda / Pavel Drozd	Sofia Polishchuk / Alexander Vakhnov	Vitaliya Sokolova / Stanislav Novozhilov
Youth Championships – Elder Age
Discipline	Gold	Silver	Bronze
Men	Alexey Erokhov	Ilia Skirda	Matvei Vetlugin
Ladies	Anna Tarusina	Stanislava Konstantinova	Sofia Samodurova
Pairs	Alina Ustimkina / Nikita Volodin	Elena Ivanova / Tahir Khakimov	Elizaveta Zhuk / Egor Britkov
Ice dancing	Evgenia Lopareva / Alexei Karpushev	Maria Marchenko / Egor Pozdnyakov	Polina Ivanenko / Daniil Karpov
Youth Championships – Younger Age
Discipline	Gold	Silver	Bronze
Men	Evgeni Semenenko	Matvei Vetlugin	Georgy Kunitsa
Ladies	Anna Shcherbakova	Anna Tarusina	Viktoria Vasilieva
Pairs	No pairs' discipline		
Ice dancing	No Ice dancing discipline		

== Senior Championships ==
The senior Championships were held in Yekaterinburg from 23 to 27 December 2015. Competitors qualified through international success or by competing in the Russian Cup series' senior-level events. The list of competitors was published on 23 December. Ksenia Stolbova / Fedor Klimov (due to Klimov's back pain) and Ksenia Monko / Kirill Khaliavin (due to Monko's injury sustained at the 2015 Rostelecom Cup) withdrew before the start of the competition.

=== Results ===
==== Men ====
Rank	Name	Total points	SP		FS	
1	Maxim Kovtun	266.13	1	93.05	1	173.08
2	Mikhail Kolyada	260.73	2	90.55	2	170.18
3	Alexander Petrov	248.64	5	81.61	3	167.03
4	Gordei Gorshkov	246.96	4	82.26	4	164.70
5	Sergei Voronov	237.68	9	76.29	5	161.39
6	Dmitri Aliev	237.47	7	81.03	6	156.44
7	Konstantin Menshov	233.76	6	81.21	7	152.55
8	Alexander Samarin	230.77	8	79.73	8	151.04
9	Adian Pitkeev	230.49	3	86.63	11	143.86
10	Artur Dmitriev Jr.	223.27	12	72.67	9	150.60
11	Anton Shulepov	221.94	10	75.86	10	146.08
12	Moris Kvitelashvili	208.63	13	69.26	12	139.37
13	Andrei Lazukin	201.00	11	74.06	13	126.94
14	Artem Lezheev	181.84	17	56.34	14	125.50
15	Dmitri Bushlanov	176.16	14	62.29	15	113.87
16	Egor Murashov	170.06	16	59.90	16	110.16
17	Evgeni Vlasov	169.16	15	62.04	17	107.12
–	Vladislav Tarasenko	withdrew	18	55.92	withdrew from competition	

==== Ladies ====
Rank	Name	Total points	SP		FS	
1	Evgenia Medvedeva	234.88	1	79.44	1	155.44
2	Elena Radionova	222.57	2	76.69	2	145.88
3	Anna Pogorilaya	214.30	4	71.22	3	143.08
4	Polina Tsurskaya	205.46	5	70.53	5	134.93
5	Maria Sotskova	201.32	8	66.14	4	135.18
6	Adelina Sotnikova	197.98	6	69.47	7	128.51
7	Yulia Lipnitskaya	195.24	3	73.77	10	121.47
8	Elizaveta Tuktamysheva	194.74	9	63.68	6	131.06
9	Alena Leonova	190.32	7	66.15	9	124.17
10	Serafima Sakhanovich	178.33	12	59.59	11	118.74
11	Alisa Fedichkina	177.54	14	52.59	8	124.95
12	Maria Artemieva	171.46	11	60.76	12	110.70
13	Diana Pervushkina	171.11	10	61.70	13	109.41
14	Ekaterina Bayanova	157.49	15	52.39	14	105.10
15	Alexandra Sayutina	154.11	17	49.01	15	105.10
16	Maria Perederova	147.32	13	52.96	17	94.36
17	Evgenia Ivankova	144.57	18	46.93	16	97.64
18	Alina Karavaeva	143.52	16	51.50	18	92.02

==== Pairs ====
Rank	Name	Total points	SP		FS	
1	Tatiana Volosozhar / Maxim Trankov	228.96	1	83.65	1	145.31
2	Yuko Kavaguti / Alexander Smirnov	217.64	2	77.26	2	140.38
3	Evgenia Tarasova / Vladimir Morozov	217.52	3	77.21	3	140.31
4	Kristina Astakhova / Alexei Rogonov	206.39	4	71.89	4	134.50
5	Natalja Zabijako / Alexander Enbert	205.03	5	70.60	5	134.43
6	Vera Bazarova / Andrei Deputat	193.84	6	67.30	6	126.54
7	Sofia Biryukova / Andrei Filonov	173.57	7	62.60	7	110.97
8	Anastasia Gubanova / Alexei Sintsov	166.28	8	56.55	8	109.73
9	Alisa Efimova / Alexander Korovin	161.30	11	54.34	9	106.96
10	Anastasia Poluianova / Stepan Korotkov	155.76	10	54.45	10	101.31
11	Alexandra Shevchenko / Ivan Bich	154.51	9	55.36	11	99.15
12	Tatiana Kuznetsova / Semën Stepanov	148.45	12	50.40	12	98.05

==== Ice dancing ====
Rank	Name	Total points	SD		FD	
1	Ekaterina Bobrova / Dmitri Soloviev	176.98	2	70.21	1	106.77
2	Victoria Sinitsina / Nikita Katsalapov	175.83	1	73.96	3	101.87
3	Alexandra Stepanova / Ivan Bukin	170.26	3	68.56	4	101.70
4	Elena Ilinykh / Ruslan Zhiganshin	169.72	4	66.75	2	102.97
5	Tiffany Zahorski / Jonathan Guerreiro	159.60	5	61.30	5	98.30
6	Anna Yanovskaya / Sergey Mozgov	139.86	6	57.92	6	81.94
7	Ludmila Sosnitskaia / Pavel Golovishnikov	130.41	7	53.55	7	76.86
8	Anastasia Safronova / Ilia Zimin	108.24	8	43.68	8	64.56
9	Anzhelika Kanivets / Alexei Chizhov	93.75	10	35.46	9	58.29
10	Margarita Shestakova / Savely Ugriumov	91.67	9	36.57	10	55.10

== Junior Championships ==
The 2016 Russian Junior Championships (Russian: Первенство России среди юниоров 2016) were held in Chelyabinsk from 21 to 23 January 2016. Competitors qualified by competing in the Russian Cup series' junior-level events. The results of the January competition were part of the selection criteria for the 2016 Winter Youth Olympics and the 2016 World Junior Championships. The list of qualifiers was published on 12 January 2016. Alena Kostornaia withdrew before the start of the event and was replaced by Elizaveta Iushenko.

=== Results ===
==== Men ====
Rank	Name	Region	Total points	SP		FS	
1	Dmitri Aliev	SPB	237.76	1	85.24	1	152.52
2	Alexander Samarin	MOS	223.50	2	82.97	2	140.53
3	Roman Savosin	MOS	207.40	3	71.57	4	135.83
4	Ilia Skirda	MOS	198.31	7	65.56	5	132.75
5	Georgy Kunitsa	MOS	197.17	9	65.00	6	132.17
6	Petr Gumennik	SPB	194.61	4	70.58	10	124.03
7	Evgeni Semenenko	SPB	193.75	17	55.70	3	138.05
8	Daniil Bernadiner	MOS	190.64	10	64.76	7	125.88
9	Evgeni Ilyn	Kazan	187.68	11	63.54	9	124.14
10	Andrei Lazukin	SPB	186.01	5	69.56	13	116.45
11	Matvei Vetlugin	MOS	184.06	15	58.96	8	125.10
12	Alexey Erokhov	MOS	180.90	8	65.26	14	115.64
13	Artem Frolov	MOS	180.55	14	59.95	11	120.60
14	Artem Kovalev	MOS	179.73	13	61.50	12	118.23
15	Igor Efimchuk	SPB	175.39	6	67.18	16	108.21
16	Mikhail Zotov	MOS	166.31	12	62.93	17	103.38
17	Nikolai Gerasimov	MOS	166.28	16	56.87	15	109.41
18	Vladimir Samoilov	MOS	149.06	18	51.39	18	97.67

==== Ladies ====
Rank	Name	Region	Total points	SP		FS	
1	Polina Tsurskaya	MOS	210.04	1	73.51	1	136.53
2	Maria Sotskova	MOS	191.81	2	67.70	2	124.11
3	Alisa Fedichkina	SPB	187.44	3	66.89	3	120.55
4	Elizaveta Nugumanova	SPB	185.36	4	65.24	4	120.12
5	Alisa Lozko	SPB	175.55	6	61.75	6	113.80
6	Sofia Samodurova	SPB	174.62	10	59.39	5	115.23
7	Anna Tarusina	MOS	171.97	8	61.13	7	110.84
8	Stanislava Konstantinova	SPB	169.55	5	64.19	11	105.36
9	Alina Zagitova	MOS	160.93	12	52.85	8	108.08
10	Ekaterina Mitrofanova	MOS	160.14	14	52.15	9	107.99
11	Anastasia Mukhortova	MOS	159.17	13	52.71	10	106.46
12	Anastasiia Gubanova	SPB	156.73	9	60.26	16	96.47
13	Valeria Mikhailova	MOS	155.46	11	53.60	13	101.86
14	Elizaveta Iushenko	MOS	154.36	16	51.59	12	102.77
15	Ekaterina Kurakova	MOS	149.81	15	51.84	15	97.97
16	Anastasia Tarakanova	MOS	149.08	18	47.62	14	101.46
17	Serafima Sakhanovich	SPB	146.68	7	61.46	18	85.22
18	Diana Pervushkina	TOL	145.60	17	51.52	17	94.08

==== Pairs ====
Rank	Name	Region	Total points	SP		FS	
1	Anastasia Mishina / Vladislav Mirzoev	SPB	183.84	1	65.45	1	118.39
2	Amina Atakhanova / Ilia Spiridonov	MOS	176.95	3	61.87	2	115.08
3	Ekaterina Borisova / Dmitry Sopot	Perm	170.25	2	64.73	3	105.52
4	Anastasia A. Gubanova / Alexei Sintsov	Perm	158.92	4	56.62	6	102.30
5	Alina Ustimkina / Nikita Volodin	SPB	155.51	9	51.24	4	104.27
6	Anastasia Poluianova / Stepan Korotkov	Perm	154.53	8	51.43	5	103.10
7	Elena Ivanova / Tahir Khakimov	Perm	147.87	10	50.88	7	96.99
8	Albina Sokur / Roman Pleshkov	MOS	145.55	5	54.81	8	90.74
9	Lyudmila Molchanova / Lev Sozonenko	MOS	141.02	6	52.56	9	88.46
10	Elizaveta Zhuk / Egor Britkov	Yekaterinburg	139.83	7	52.00	10	87.83
11	Maria Bogoslovskaya / Denis Khodykin	MOS	131.19	11	49.21	11	81.98
12	Anastasia Melnikova / Alexander Simenenko	SPB	115.48	12	42.71	12	72.77

==== Ice dancing ====
Rank	Name	Region	Total points	SD		FD	
1	Alla Loboda / Pavel Drozd	MOS	164.90	1	68.84	2	96.06
2	Betina Popova / Yuri Vlasenko	MOS	157.82	4	61.62	1	96.20
3	Anastasia Shpilevaya / Grigory Smirnov	M/H	155.96	2	63.73	3	92.23
4	Sofia Evdokimova / Egor Bazin	Togliatti	144.75	5	60.15	5	84.60
5	Anastasia Skoptsova / Kirill Aleshin	MOS	144.22	7	59.41	4	84.81
6	Sofia Polishchuk / Alexander Vakhnov	MOS	142.79	3	62.05	6	80.74
7	Sofia Shevchenko / Igor Eremenko	MOS	139.31	6	59.59	8	79.72
8	Vitaliya Sokolova / Stanislav Novozhilov	MOS	135.05	8	54.52	7	80.53
9	Evgenia Lopareva / Alexei Karpushev	MOS	131.40	9	53.73	9	77.67
10	Maria Marchenko / Egor Pozdnyakov	MOS	125.28	10	53.46	12	71.82
11	Daria Rumiantseva / Dmitri Riabchenko	MOS	122.59	13	49.74	11	72.85
12	Polina Ivanenko / Daniil Karpov	Orenburg	121.44	12	50.44	13	71.00
13	Alexandra Amelhina / Andrei Filatov	MOS	119.68	14	46.76	10	72.92
14	Yulia Tultseva / Gregoriy Yakushev	MOS	119.31	11	52.25	14	67.06
WD	Ksenia Konkina / Georgi Reviya	MOB					

== International team selections ==
=== European Championships ===
Russia's team to the 2016 European Championships was published on 27 December 2015.

	Men	Ladies	Pairs	Ice dancing
1	Maxim Kovtun	Evgenia Medvedeva	Tatiana Volosozhar / Maxim Trankov	Ekaterina Bobrova / Dmitri Soloviev
2	Mikhail Kolyada	Elena Radionova	~~Yuko Kavaguti / Alexander Smirnov~~	Victoria Sinitsina / Nikita Katsalapov
3	Alexander Petrov	Anna Pogorilaya	~~Ksenia Stolbova / Fedor Klimov~~	Alexandra Stepanova / Ivan Bukin
1st alt.	Gordei Gorshkov	Adelina Sotnikova	Evgenia Tarasova / Vladimir Morozov (added)	Elena Ilinykh / Ruslan Zhiganshin
2nd alt.	Sergei Voronov	Yulia Lipnitskaya	Kristina Astakhova / Alexei Rogonov (added)	Tiffany Zahorski /Jonathan Guerreiro
3rd alt.	Dmitri Aliev	Elizaveta Tuktamysheva	Natalja Zabijako / Alexander Enbert	
4th alt.		Maria Sotskova		

=== Winter Youth Olympics ===
Russia's team to the 2016 Winter Youth Olympics was published on 23 January 2016.

	Men	Ladies	Pairs	Ice dancing
1	Dmitri Aliev	Polina Tsurskaya	Ekaterina Borisova / Dmitry Sopot	Anastasia Shpilevaya / Grigory Smirnov
2		Maria Sotskova	Alina Ustimkina / Nikita Volodin	Anastasia Skoptsova / Kirill Aleshin

=== World Junior Championships ===
Russia's team to the 2016 World Junior Championships was published on 23 January 2016.

	Men	Ladies	Pairs	Ice dancing
1	Dmitri Aliev	Polina Tsurskaya	Anastasia Mishina / Vladislav Mirzoev	Alla Loboda / Pavel Drozd
2	Alexander Samarin	Maria Sotskova	~~Amina Atakhanova / Ilia Spiridonov~~	Betina Popova / Yuri Vlasenko
3	Roman Savosin	Alisa Fedichkina	Ekaterina Borisova / Dmitry Sopot	Anastasia Shpilevaya / Grigory Smirnov
Alt.	Petr Gumennik	Alisa Lozko	Anastasia A. Gubanova / Alexei Sintsov (added)	Sofia Evdokimova / Egor Bazin
Alt.	Alexander Petrov	Stanislava Konstantinova	Alina Ustimkina / Nikita Volodin	Anastasia Skoptsova / Kirill Aleshin
Alt.			Anastasia Poluianova / Stepan Korotkov	Sofia Polishchuk / Alexander Vakhnov

=== World Championships ===
Russia's team to the 2016 World Championships was published on 8 March 2016.

	Men	Ladies	Pairs	Ice dancing
1	Maxim Kovtun	Evgenia Medvedeva	Tatiana Volosozhar / Maxim Trankov	Victoria Sinitsina / Nikita Katsalapov
2	Mikhail Kolyada	Elena Radionova	Ksenia Stolbova / Fedor Klimov	Alexandra Stepanova / Ivan Bukin
3		Anna Pogorilaya	Evgenia Tarasova / Vladimir Morozov	
1st alt.	Alexander Petrov	Yulia Lipnitskaya	Kristina Astakhova / Alexei Rogonov	Elena Ilinykh / Ruslan Zhiganshin
2nd alt.	Sergei Voronov	Adelina Sotnikova	Vera Bazarova / Andrei Deputat	
3rd alt.		Maria Sotskova		
