= Ekaterina Borisova =

Russian pair skater (born 1999)

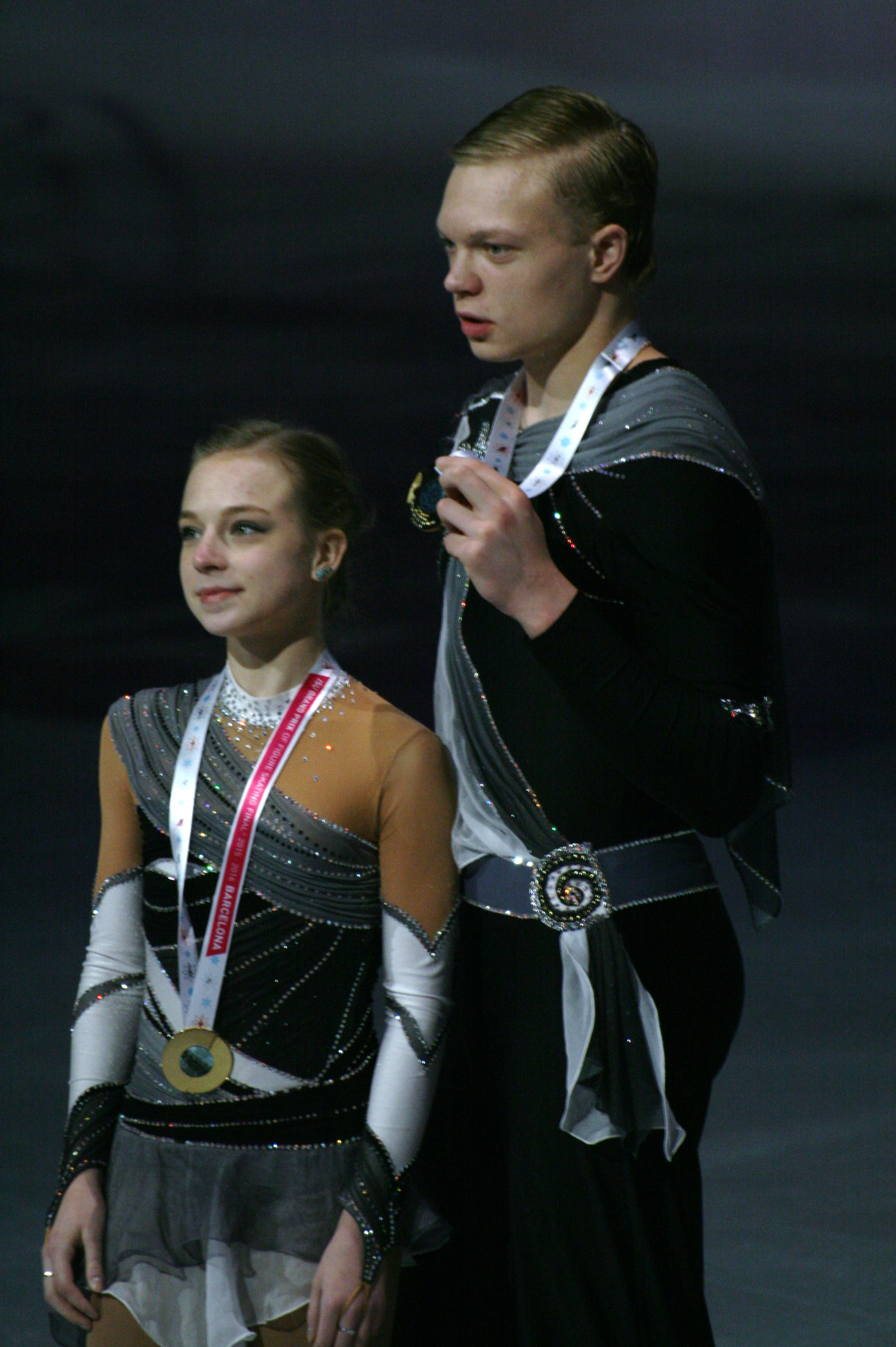
- Borisova/Sopot in December 2015

Personal information
- Born: 13 September 1999 (age 27) Chelyabinsk, Russia
- Height: 1.54 m (5 ft 1/2 in)

Figure skating career
- Country: Russia
- Coach: Valentina Tiukova, Valeri Tiukov, Pavel Sliusarenko
- Skating club: Perm Krai Sports Center
- Began skating: 2003
- Retired: 2017
Medal record
Representing Russia
Figure skating: Pairs
Winter Youth Olympics
Gold medal – first place	2016 Lillehammer	Pairs
World Junior Championships
Bronze medal – third place	2016 Debrecen	Pairs
Junior Grand Prix Final
Gold medal – first place	2015–16 Barcelona	Pairs

Ekaterina Sergeyevna Borisova (Russian: Екатерина Сергеевна Борисова; born 13 September 1999) is a Russian former competitive pair skater. With partner Dmitry Sopot, she was the 2016 Youth Olympic champion, the 2016 World Junior bronze medalist, and 2015 Junior Grand Prix Final champion.

== Career ==
Borisova began learning to skate in 2003. She competed as a single skater before teaming up with Sergei Lisiev, in 2012. She skated two seasons with Lisiev.

=== Partnership with Sopot ===
Borisova teamed up with Dmitry Sopot in the summer of 2014. The two qualified for the 2015 Russian Junior Championships and finished in 8th place.

Borisova/Sopot made their international debut competing in the 2015–16 Junior Grand Prix (JGP) series. They took the bronze medal at their first assignment, the JGP in Latvia, before winning gold at the JGP in Poland. These results qualified them for the 2015–16 JGP Final in Barcelona. In Spain, they outscored the Czech Republic's Anna Dušková / Martin Bidař by 9.53 points for the gold medal.

In January 2016, Borisova/Sopot were awarded the bronze medal at the Russian Junior Championships, having finished third to Anastasia Mishina / Vladislav Mirzoev (gold) and Amina Atakhanova / Ilia Spiridonov (silver). In February, they represented Russia at the 2016 Winter Youth Olympics in Hamar, Norway. Ranked second in the short program and first in the free skate, they won the gold by a margin of 2.53 points over Dušková/Bidař. On March 17–21, competing at the 2016 World Junior Championships in Debrecen, Hungary, Borisova/Sopot placed fourth in the short and third in the free, taking the bronze medal overall behind Czech pair skaters Anna Dušková / Martin Bidař and teammates Anastasia Mishina / Vladislav Mirzoev who took the gold and silver medals respectively.

== Programs ==
(with Sopot)

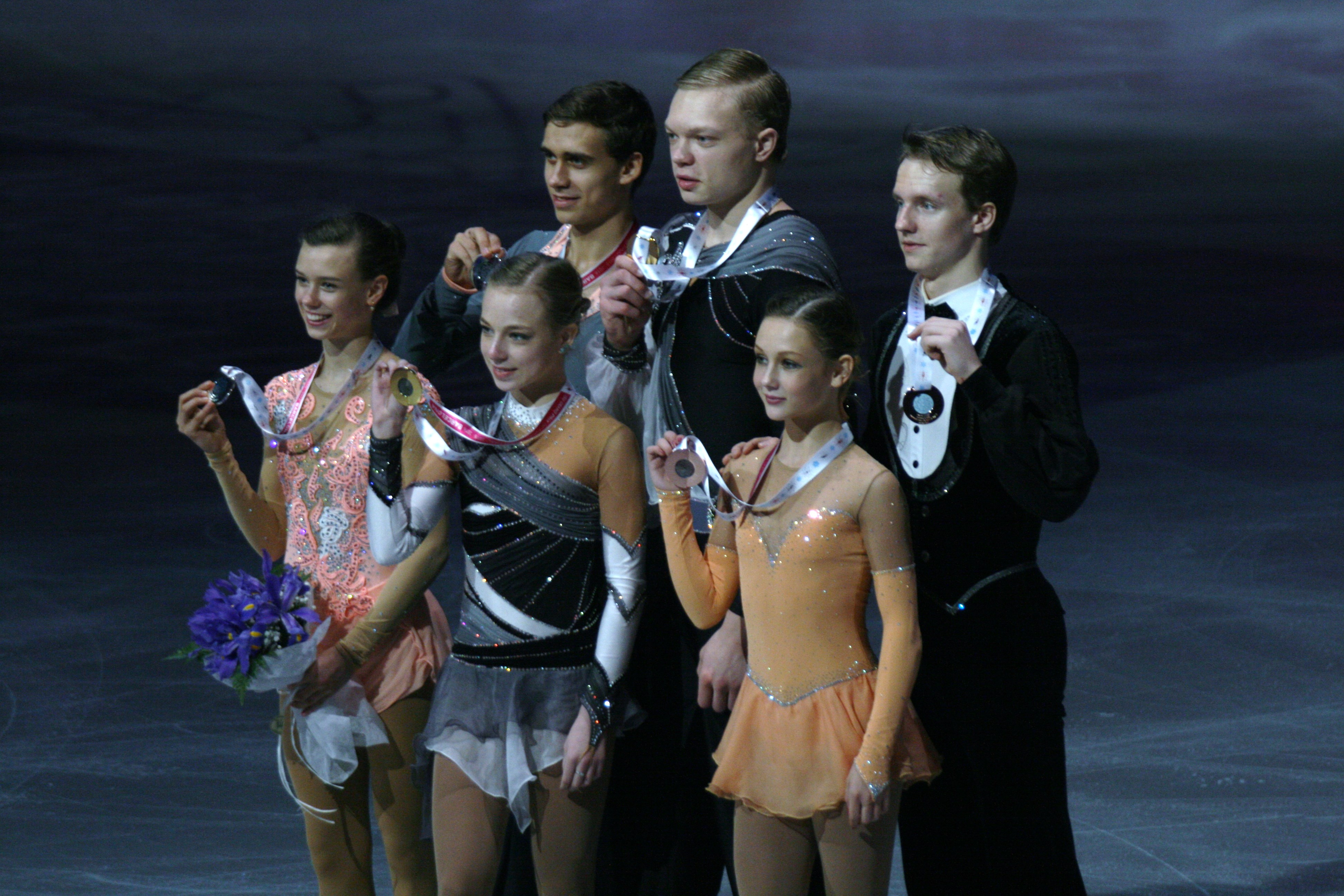
Borisova/Sopot at the 2015–16 Junior Grand Prix Final pairs' medal ceremony

Season	Short program	Free skating	Exhibition
2016–2017	Dance of the Knights performed by Bel Suono	Still Loving You by the Scorpions	
2015–2016	Ninja by Maxime Rodriguez	Lawrence of Arabia by Maurice Jarre	Crazy in Love (Remix) by Beyoncé
2014–2015	Korobeiniki	Lawrence of Arabia by Maurice Jarre	

(with Lisiev)

Season	Short program	Free skating
2013–2014	Street Passions by Didula	Primavera by Ludovico Einaudi

== Competitive highlights ==
JGP: Junior Grand Prix

=== With Sopot ===
International
Event	2014–15	2015–16	2016–17
Junior Worlds		3rd	
Youth Olympics		1st	
JGP Final		1st	WD
JGP Estonia			3rd
JGP Latvia		3rd	
JGP Poland		1st	
JGP Russia			3rd
National
Russian Jr. Champ.	8th	3rd	8th
Team events
Youth Olympics		4th T 1st P	
TBD = Assigned; WD = Withdrew; T = Team result; P = Personal result Medals awarded for team result only.

=== With Lisiev ===
National
Event	2012–13	2013–14
Russian Junior Champ.	WD	6th
WD = Withdrew

== Detailed results ==
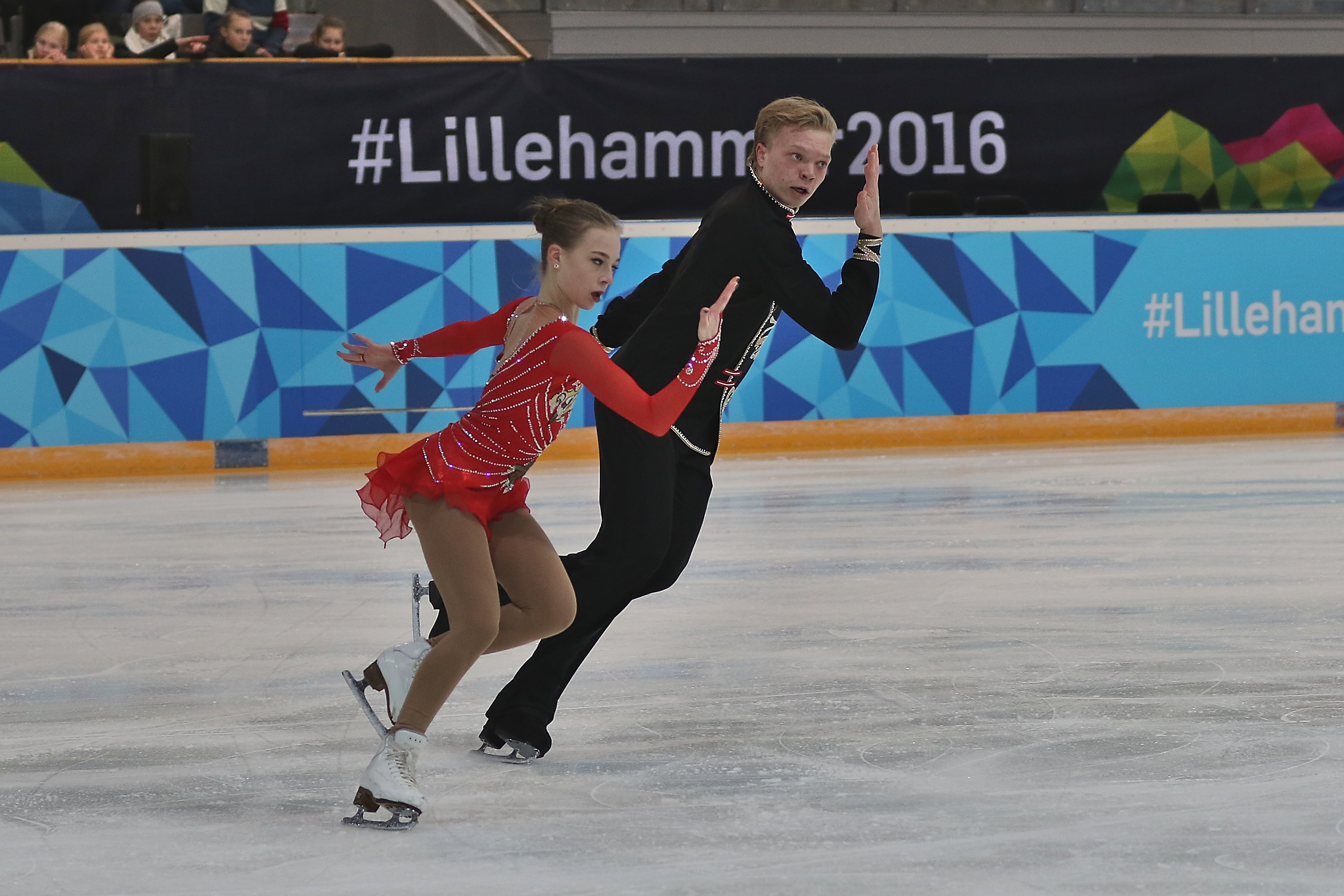
Borisova/Sopot at YOG 2016 in Lillehammer

With Sopot

2016–17 season
Date	Event	Level	SP	FS	Total
1–5 February 2017	2017 Russian Junior Championships	Junior	11; 53.02	6; 104.87	8; 157.89
28 September – 2 October 2016	2016 JGP Estonia	Junior	4; 56.34	3; 93.91	3; 150.25
14–18 September 2016	2016 JGP Russia	Junior	3; 54.74	2; 96.02	3; 150.76
2015–16 season
Date	Event	Level	SP	FS	Total
14–20 March 2016	2016 World Junior Championships	Junior	4; 58.56	3; 110.44	3; 169.00
12–21 February 2016	2016 Winter Youth Olympics - Team Event	Junior	-	1; 104.80	4
12–21 February 2016	2016 Winter Youth Olympics	Junior	1; 60.80	1; 107.86	1; 168.66
19–23 January 2016	2016 Russian Junior Championships	Junior	2; 64.73	3; 105.52	3; 170.25
10–13 December 2015	2015−16 JGP Final	Junior	1; 60.29	1; 111.57	1; 171.86
23–27 September 2015	2015 JGP Poland	Junior	2; 55.40	1; 103.42	1; 158.82
26–30 August 2015	2015 JGP Latvia	Junior	2; 49.77	4; 85.65	3; 135.42
2014–15 season
Date	Event	Level	SP	FS	Total
4–7 February 2015	2015 Russian Junior Championships	Junior	6; 50.98	11; 82.71	8; 133.69
