= Dmitry Sopot =

Russian pair skater (born 1998)

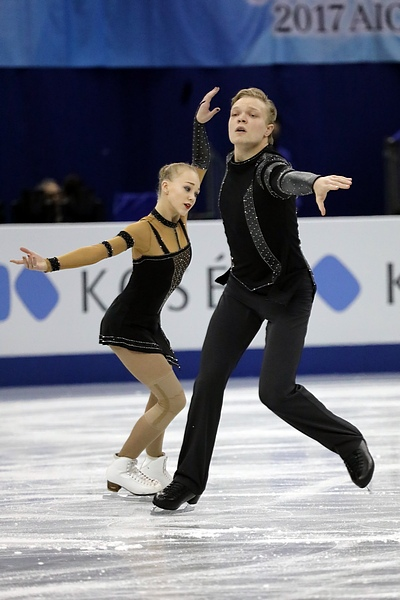
- Poluianova/Sopot in December 2017

Personal information
- Born: 1 May 1998 (age 28) Tver, Russia
- Home town: Perm, Russia
- Height: 1.88 m (6 ft 2 in)

Figure skating career
- Country: Russia
- Partner: Anastasia Poluianova
- Coach: Valentina Tiukova, Valeri Tiukov, Pavel Sliusarenko
- Skating club: Perm Krai Sports Center
- Began skating: 2001
- Retired: August 22, 2019
Medal record
Figure skating: Pairs
Representing Russia (with Poluianova)
Winter Universiade
Silver medal – second place	2019 Krasnoyarsk	Pairs
Representing Russia (with Borisova)
Winter Youth Olympics
Gold medal – first place	2016 Lillehammer	Pairs
World Junior Championships
Bronze medal – third place	2016 Debrecen	Pairs
Junior Grand Prix Final
Gold medal – first place	2015–16 Barcelona	Pairs

Dmitry Vladimirovich Sopot, (Russian: Дмитрий Владимирович Сопот, born 1 May 1998) is a Russian retired pair skater. With former partner Ekaterina Borisova, he is the 2016 Youth Olympic champion, the 2016 World Junior bronze medalist, and 2015 Junior Grand Prix Final champion. He later competed with Anastasia Poluianova.

== Career ==
Sopot began learning to skate in 2001. He competed as a single skater before teaming up with Alexandra Evsiukova, in 2013. They skated together for one season.

=== Partnership with Borisova ===
Sopot teamed up with Ekaterina Borisova in the summer of 2014. The two qualified for the 2015 Russian Junior Championships and finished in 8th place.

Borisova/Sopot made their international debut competing in the 2015–16 Junior Grand Prix (JGP) series. They took the bronze medal at their first assignment, the JGP in Latvia, before winning gold at the JGP in Poland. These results qualified them for the 2015–16 JGP Final in Barcelona. In Spain, they outscored the Czech Republic's Anna Dušková / Martin Bidař by 9.53 points for the gold medal.

In January 2016, Borisova/Sopot were awarded the bronze medal at the Russian Junior Championships, having finished third to Anastasia Mishina / Vladislav Mirzoev (gold) and Amina Atakhanova / Ilia Spiridonov (silver). In February, they represented Russia at the 2016 Winter Youth Olympics in Hamar, Norway. Ranked second in the short program and first in the free skate, they won the gold by a margin of 2.53 points over Dušková/Bidař. On March 17–21, competing at the 2016 World Junior Championships in Debrecen, Hungary, Borisova/Sopot placed fourth in the short and third in the free, taking the bronze medal overall behind Czech pair skaters Anna Dušková / Martin Bidař and teammates Anastasia Mishina / Vladislav Mirzoev who took the gold and silver medals respectively.

=== 2017–2018 season: Partnership with Poluianova ===
Sopot teamed up with Anastasia Poluianova in 2017. They made their international debut at the 2017–18 JGP event in Minsk, Belarus where they placed 2nd behind teammates Daria Pavliuchenko / Denis Khodykin. They placed 3rd at their second JGP assignment, in Gdańsk, Poland. Their results qualified them for the 2017–18 JGP Final in Nagoya, Japan, where they placed 6th.

In November 2017 Poluianova/Sopot made their international senior debut at the 2017 CS Tallinn Trophy where they won the bronze medal.

At the 2018 Russian Championships, they placed 10th on the senior level and 8th at the junior event.

=== 2018–2019 season ===
Poluianova/Sopot started their season by competing in the 2018 JGP series. At their first JGP event of the season they won the silver medal in Linz, Austria. They were ranked 3rd in the short program and 2nd in the free skate and they were part of a Russian sweep of the pairs' podium. Poluianova/Sopot were more than 14 points behind the gold medalists, Polina Kostiukovich / Dmitrii Ialin but they beat the bronze medalists, Alina Pepeleva / Roman Pleshkov, by more than 7 points.

At their 2nd JGP event of the season they placed 4th in Ostrava, Czech Republic. With these results they qualified for the 2018–19 Junior Grand Prix Final where they finished 5th.

According to Tamara Moskvina, head coach of the Tamara Moskvina skating school where Anastasia and Dmitri trained, they have split up. He went on a cruise ship to skate in shows there. She apparently is not looking for a partner to continue her competitive career but plans to join the cruise ship once she is old enough.

== Programs ==
=== With Poluianova ===
Season	Short program	Free skating
2018–2019	Rain, In Your Black Eyes by Ezio Bosso	Adagio of Spartacus and Phrygia by Aram Khachaturian
2017–2018	Gabriel's Realm by Nathalie Manser	The Unforgiven Nothing Else Matters by Metallica

=== With Borisova ===
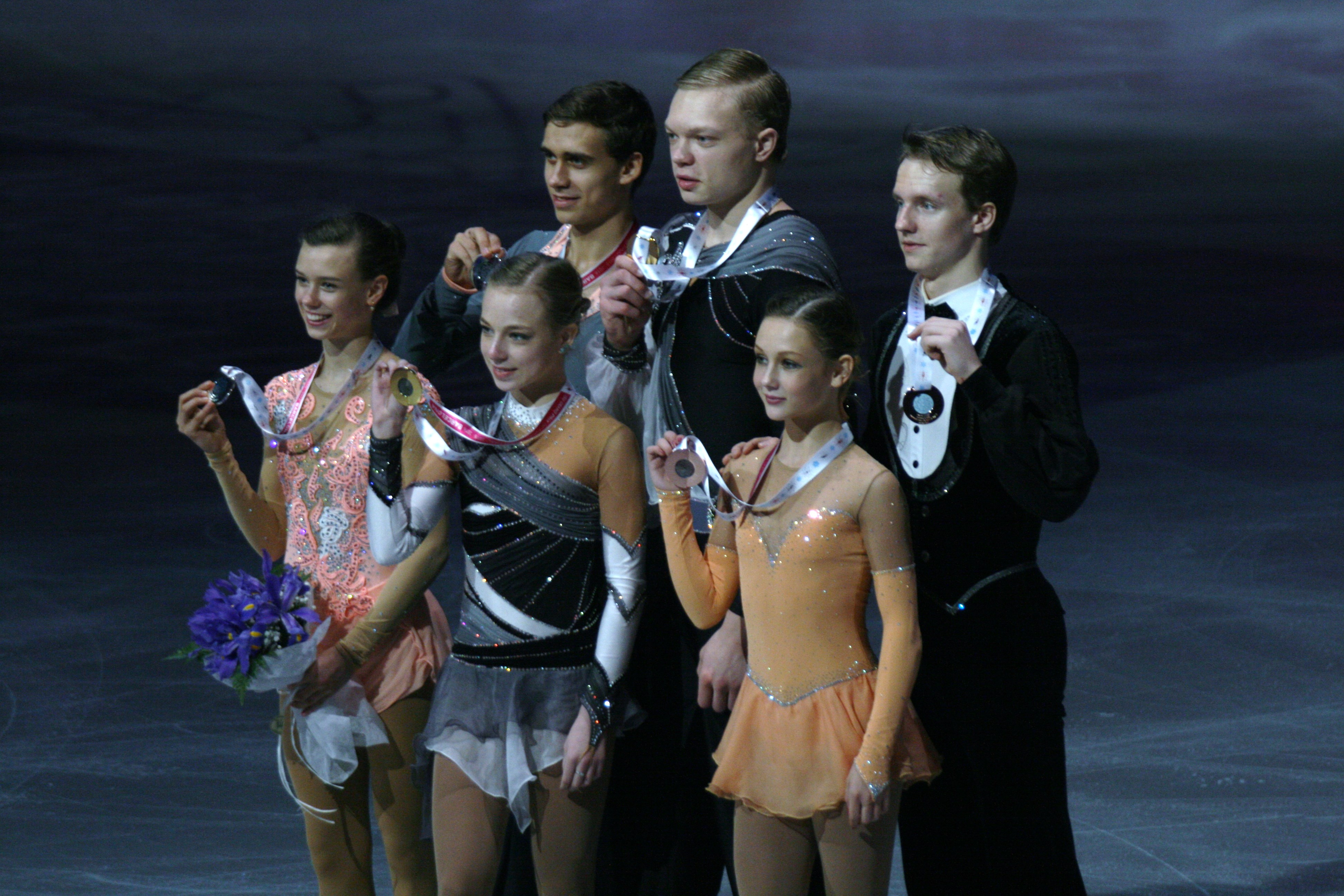
Borisova/Sopot at the 2015–16 Junior Grand Prix Final pairs' medal ceremony

Season	Short program	Free skating	Exhibition
2016–2017	Dance of the Knights performed by Bel Suono	Still Loving You by the Scorpions	
2015–2016	Ninja by Maxime Rodriguez	Lawrence of Arabia by Maurice Jarre	Crazy in Love (Remix) by Beyoncé
2014–2015	Korobeiniki	Lawrence of Arabia by Maurice Jarre	

== Competitive highlights ==
JGP: Junior Grand Prix

=== With Poluianova ===
International
Event	2017–18	2018–19
CS Tallinn Trophy	3rd	
Universiade		2nd
International: Junior
JGP Final	6th	5th
JGP Austria		2nd
JGP Belarus	2nd	
JGP Czech Republic		4th
JGP Poland	3rd	
National
Russian Champ.	10th	12th
Russian Jr. Champ.	8th	WD
TBD = Assigned; WD = Withdrew

=== With Borisova ===
International
Event	2014–15	2015–16	2016–17
Junior Worlds		3rd	
Youth Olympics		1st	
JGP Final		1st	WD
JGP Estonia			3rd
JGP Latvia		3rd	
JGP Poland		1st	
JGP Russia			3rd
National
Russian Jr. Champ.	8th	3rd	8th
Team events
Youth Olympics		4th T 1st P	
TBD = Assigned; WD = Withdrew; T = Team result; P = Personal result Medals awarded for team result only.

== Detailed results ==
=== With Poluianova ===
2018–19 season
Date	Event	Level	SP	FS	Total
7–9 March 2019	2019 Winter Universiade	Senior	1; 58.92	2; 111.07	2; 169.99
19–23 December 2018	2019 Russian Championships	Senior	11; 59.08	11; 113.81	12; 172.89
6–9 December 2018	2018–19 JGP Final	Junior	5; 59.28	5; 99.05	5; 158.33
26–29 September 2018	2018 JGP Czech Republic	Junior	3; 59.80	4; 95.81	4; 155.61
29 August – 1 September 2018	2018 JGP Austria	Junior	3; 54.07	2; 112.04	2; 166.11
2017–18 season
Date	Event	Level	SP	FS	Total
23–26 January 2018	2018 Russian Junior Championships	Junior	7; 58.42	9; 106.77	8; 165.19
21–24 December 2017	2018 Russian Championships	Senior	10; 56.10	9; 118.02	10; 174.12
7–10 December 2017	2017–18 JGP Final	Junior	5; 57.28	6; 103.19	6; 160.47
21–26 November 2017	2017 CS Tallinn Trophy	Senior	4; 53.86	2; 107.74	3; 161.60
4–7 October 2017	2017 JGP Poland	Junior	3; 56.81	3; 102.37	3; 159.18
20–24 September 2017	2017 JGP Belarus	Junior	1; 56.37	2; 105.77	2; 162.14

=== With Borisova ===
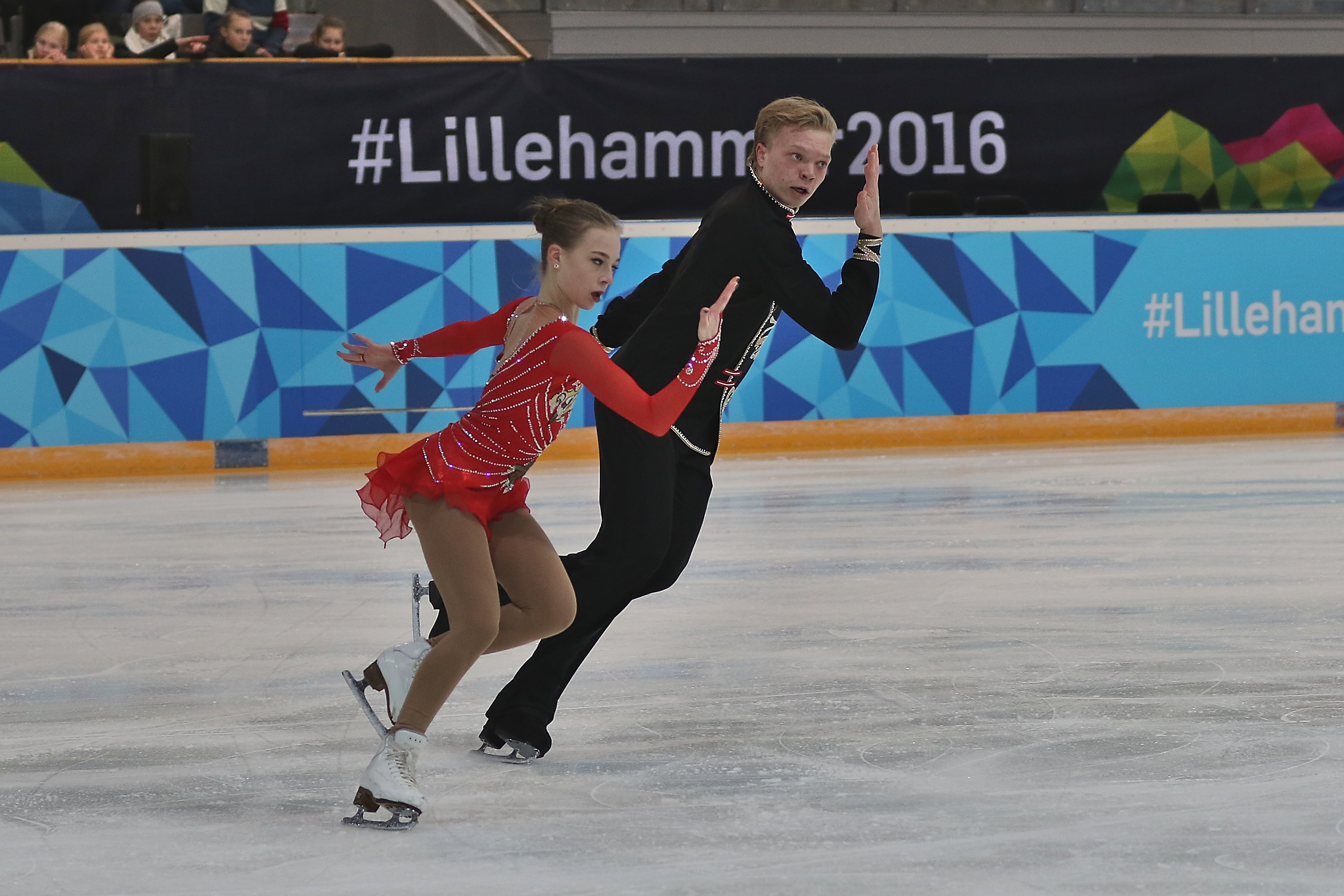
Borisova/Sopot at YOG 2016 in Lillehammer

2016–17 season
Date	Event	Level	SP	FS	Total
1–5 February 2017	2017 Russian Junior Championships	Junior	11; 53.02	6; 104.87	8; 157.89
28 September – 2 October 2016	2016 JGP Estonia	Junior	4; 56.34	3; 93.91	3; 150.25
14–18 September 2016	2016 JGP Russia	Junior	3; 54.74	2; 96.02	3; 150.76
2015–16 season
Date	Event	Level	SP	FS	Total
14–20 March 2016	2016 World Junior Championships	Junior	4; 58.56	3; 110.44	3; 169.00
12–21 February 2016	2016 Winter Youth Olympics - Team Event	Junior	-	1; 104.80	4
12–21 February 2016	2016 Winter Youth Olympics	Junior	1; 60.80	1; 107.86	1; 168.66
19–23 January 2016	2016 Russian Junior Championships	Junior	2; 64.73	3; 105.52	3; 170.25
10–13 December 2015	2015−16 JGP Final	Junior	1; 60.29	1; 111.57	1; 171.86
23–27 September 2015	2015 JGP Poland	Junior	2; 55.40	1; 103.42	1; 158.82
26–30 August 2015	2015 JGP Latvia	Junior	2; 49.77	4; 85.65	3; 135.42
2014–15 season
Date	Event	Level	SP	FS	Total
4–7 February 2015	2015 Russian Junior Championships	Junior	6; 50.98	11; 82.71	8; 133.69
