= Sofia Evdokimova =

Russian ice dancer (born 1996)

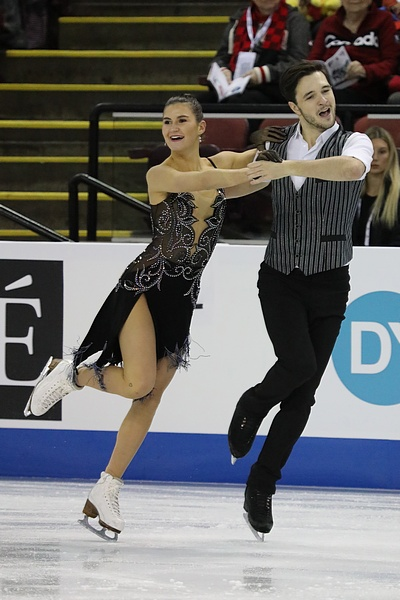
- Evdokimova/Bazin at 2019 Skate Canada International

Personal information
- Native name: Софья Геннадьевна Евдокимова
- Full name: Sofia Gennadyevna Evdokimova
- Born: 27 November 1996 (age 29) Tolyatti, Samara Oblast, Russia
- Home town: Tolyatti, Russia
- Height: 1.70 m (5 ft 7 in)

Figure skating career
- Country: Russia
- Coach: Oleg Sudakov
- Skating club: SHVSM No. 4 Tolyatti
- Began skating: 2001
- Retired: October 15, 2020
Medal record
Representing Russia
Figure skating: Ice dancing
Winter Universiade
Silver medal – second place	2017 Almaty	Ice dancing
Silver medal – second place	2019 Krasnoyarsk	Ice dancing

Sofia Gennadyevna Evdokimova (Russian: Софья Геннадьевна Евдокимова, born 27 November 1996) is a retired Russian ice dancer. With her former partner, Egor Bazin, she is the 2017 Winter Universiade silver medalist, the 2018 Ice Star champion, and the 2019 Russian national bronze medalist.

== Personal life ==
Evdokimova was born on November 27, 1996 in Tolyatti, Samara Oblast, Russia.

In March 2024, she announced her engagement to Russian-Hungarian pair skater, Alexei Sviatchenko. They married in April 2025.

== Career ==
=== Early career ===
Evdokimova teamed up with Egor Bazin in 2007. The duo debuted on the ISU Junior Grand Prix (JGP) series in the 2011–12 season, finishing seventh in Austria. In the 2013–14 season, they won their first JGP medal – bronze in Mexico.

=== 2014–2015 season ===
Evdokimova/Bazin started their season by competing in the 2014 JGP series. They placed fourth in both events, first at the JGP Czech Republic and then at the JGP Germany.

In 2014–15 season, Evdokimova/Bazin stepped onto the national podium for the first time, beating Alla Loboda / Pavel Drozd by 0.19 points for the bronze medal at the Russian Junior Championships. Based on this result, they were chosen to compete as Russia's third ice dancing team at the 2015 World Junior Championships in Tallinn, Estonia. Finishing tenth, Evdokimova/Bazin were the second best Russian duet after Anna Yanovskaya / Sergey Mozgov (gold), with Betina Popova / Yuri Vlasenko placing eleventh.

=== 2015–2016 season ===
In the 2015–16 season, Evdokimova/Bazin won their second JGP medal – bronze in Latvia. Two weeks later they placed fifth in JGP Austria. In October 2015 they won their first international gold medal at the 2015 Ice Star. In January 2016 they finished fourth at the 2016 Russian Junior Championships.

=== 2016–2017 season ===
In November 2016 Evdokimova/Bazin made their Grand Prix debut at the 2016 Rostelecom Cup where they placed ninth. A month later they skated their first Challenger event at the 2016 CS Golden Spin of Zagreb where they also placed ninth. In december they placed sixth at the 2017 Russian Championships. In February 2017 they competed at the 2017 Winter Universiade where they won the silver medal behind Oleksandra Nazarova / Maxim Nikitin.

=== 2017–2018 season ===
In November 2017 Evdokimova/Bazin skated at the 2017 CS Tallinn Trophy where they placed fourth. In Tallinn they were really close claiming their first Challenger series medal because they were less than 0.5 points behind the bronze medalists, Elliana Pogrebinsky / Alex Benoit. A month later Evdokimova/Bazin placed fifth at the 2018 Russian Championships.

=== 2018–2019 season ===
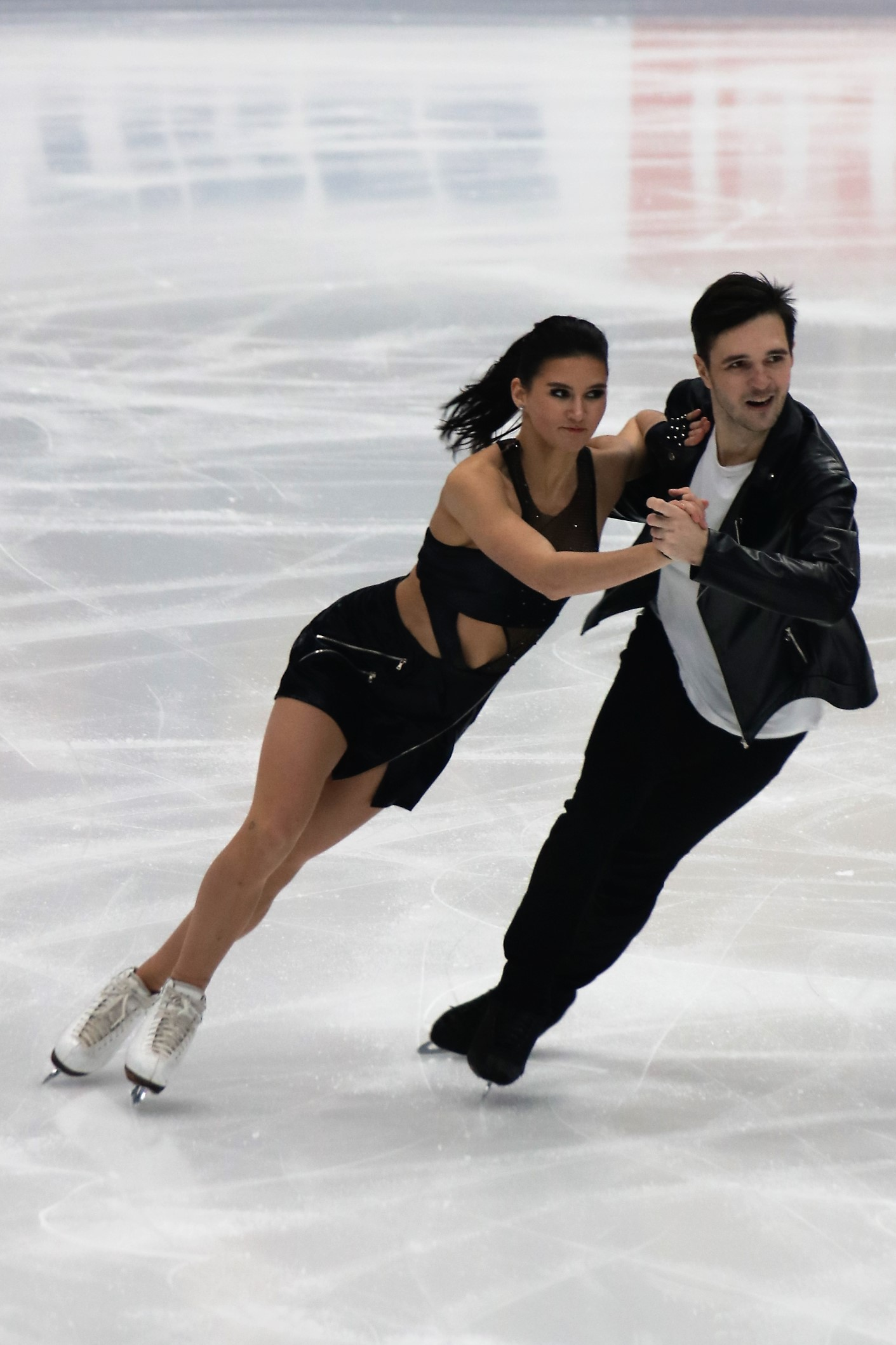
Evdokimova/Bazin at the 2019 Rostelecom Cup

Evdokimova/Bazin started their season at the 2018 CS Finlandia Trophy where they finished seventh with a personal best score of 159.67 points. Two weeks later they won their first international senior gold medal at the 2018 Ice Star. In mid November they competed at the 2018 Rostelecom Cup where they finished fourth after placing sixth in the rhythm dance and fourth in the free dance. At this competition they also scored their personal best score 164.66 points. In late November they placed fourth at the 2018 CS Tallinn Trophy with a personal best score of 168.31 points.

At the 2019 Russian Championships, Evdokimova/Bazin placed fourth in the rhythm dance, around 3 points behind the third-place finishers Tiffany Zahorski / Jonathan Guerreiro and only half a point ahead of Anastasia Shpilevaya / Grigory Smirnov in fifth. In the free dance, a disastrous skate by Zahorski/Guerreiro allowed them to take the bronze medal. Bazin subsequently said that this had been their goal from the beginning of the season. They competed at their first European Championships, placing ninth.

=== 2019–2020 season ===
Evdokimova/Bazin placed seventh at the 2019 CS Ondrej Nepela Memorial to begin the season. Competing on the Grand Prix, they were ninth at the 2019 Skate Canada International and then sixth at the 2019 Cup of China. At the 2020 Russian Championships, they placed seventh.

In March 2020, it was announced the two had ended their partnership and on October 15, 2020, Evdokimova announced her retirement from competitive skating.

=== Post-competitive career ===
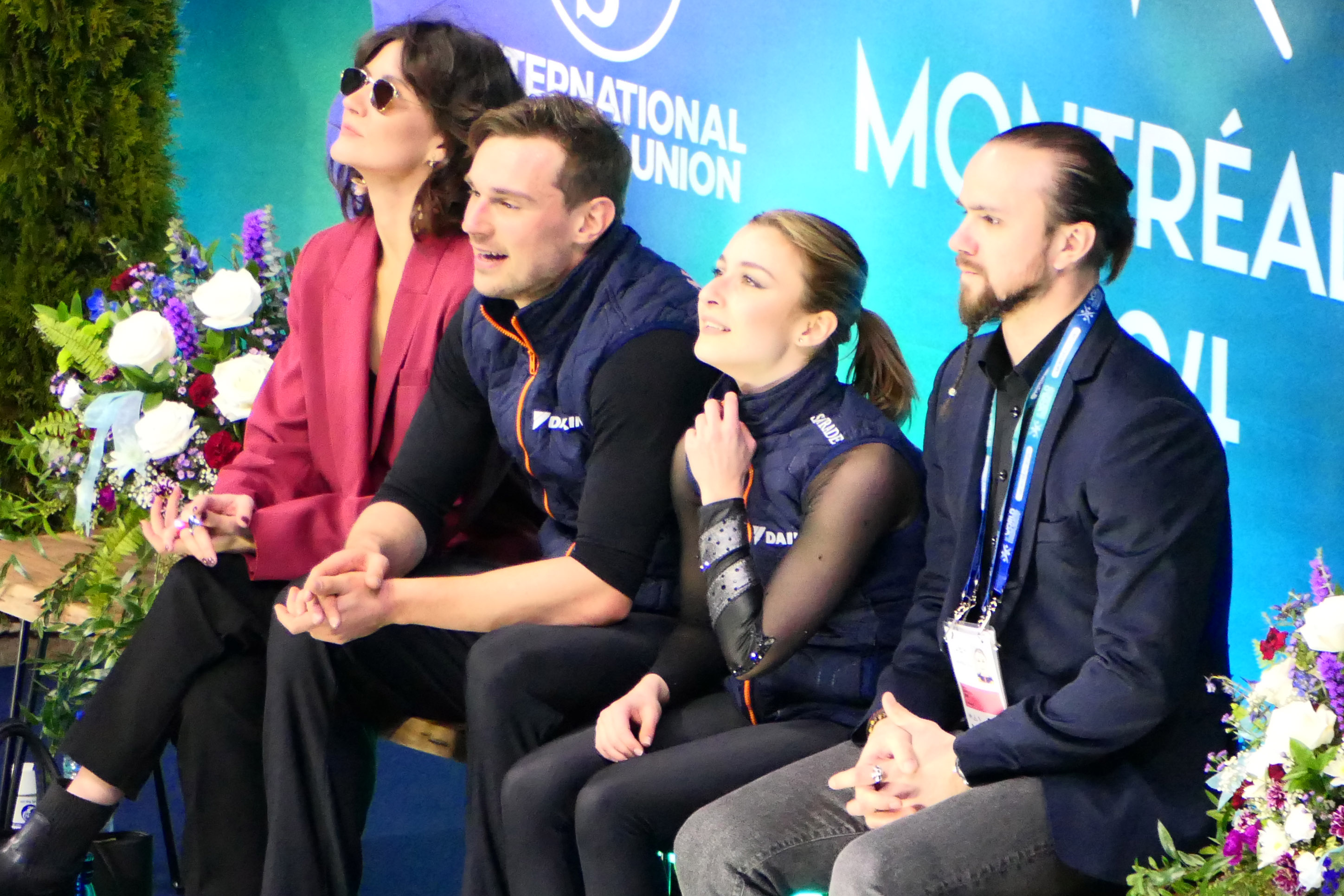
Evdokimova (far left) at the 2024 World Championships with Daria Danilova / Michel Tsiba

Following her retirement from competitive figure skating, Evdomikova began working as a figure skating choreographer. Among her clients have included:

- (Netherlands) Daria Danilova / Michel Tsiba
- (Philippines) Isabella Gamez / Aleksandr Korovin
- (Spain) Brooke McIntosh / Marco Zandron
- (Hungary) Maria Pavlova / Alexei Sviatchenko

== Programs ==
(with Bazin)

Season	Rhythm dance	Free dance
2019–2020	Blues, Quickstep: 42nd Street (from 42nd Street) by Harry Warren & Al Dubin	Remembrances (from Schindler's List) by John Williams; La terre vue du ciel by Armand Amar
2018–2019	Tango: Come Together performed by Marea Tango; Hip Hop: Imma Be performed by Black Eyed Peas	Nocturne by Secret Garden; Sarabande Suite by Globus
	Short dance	
2017–2018	Rhumba: Historia de un Amor; Samba: Arrasando performed by Thalía	Ave Maria by Thomas Spencer-Wortley
2016–2017	Blues: Minnie the Moocher; Swing: Big and Bad performed by Big Bad Voodoo Daddy	Hip Hip Chin Chin performed by Club des Belugas; Temptation performed by Diana Krall
2015–2016	Waltz: Waltz No. 2 by Dmitri Shostakovich; March: Polish polka medley	Romeo + Juliet by Craig Armstrong, Nellee Hooper
2014–2015	Samba: Paxi Ni Ngongo by Bonga; Rhumba; Samba	The best of Goran Bregović
2013–2014	Hava Nagila; Sixteen Tons	Malagueña by Ernesto Lecuona
2012–2013	Blues; Swing	Gangs of New York by Howard Shore
2011–2012	Cha Cha: Pao Pao by Elli Kokkinou; Mambo Mambo by Lou Bega	Russian Sailors Dance (from The Red Poppy) by Reinhold Glière

== Competitive highlights ==
GP: Grand Prix; CS: Challenger Series; JGP: Junior Grand Prix

With Bazin

International
Event	10–11	11–12	12–13	13–14	14–15	15–16	16–17	17–18	18–19	19–20
Europeans									9th	
GP Cup of China										6th
GP Rostelecom Cup							9th	WD	4th	
GP Skate Canada										9th
CS Finlandia Trophy									7th	
CS Golden Spin							9th			
CS Nepela Trophy										7th
CS Tallinn Trophy								4th	4th	
Universiade							2nd		2nd	
Bosphorus Cup									1st	3rd
Ice Mall Cup									2nd	
Ice Star							3rd		1st	
International: Junior
Junior Worlds					10th					
JGP Austria		7th				5th				
JGP Czech Rep.				4th	4th					
JGP France			5th							
JGP Germany					4th					
JGP Latvia						3rd				
JGP Mexico				3rd						
JGP Slovenia			7th							
Ice Star						1st				
National
Russia							6th	5th	3rd	7th
Russia, Junior	11th	6th	5th		3rd	4th				
TBD = Assigned; WD = Withdrew

== Detailed results ==
Small medals for short and free programs awarded only at ISU Championships.

With Bazin

2019–20 season
Date	Event	RD	FD	Total
24–29 December 2019	2020 Russian Championships	6; 71.42	7; 109.26	7; 180.68
25–30 November 2019	2019 Bosphorus Cup	4; 71.61	3; 108.34	3; 179.95
8–10 November 2019	2019 Cup of China	7; 64.07	6; 105.20	6; 169.27
25–27 October 2019	2019 Skate Canada	9; 67.20	10; 100.19	9; 167.39
19–21 September 2019	2019 CS Ondrej Nepela Memorial	6; 66.31	7; 98.31	7; 164.62
2018–19 season
Date	Event	RD	FD	Total
7–9 March 2019	2019 Winter Universiade	2; 68.32	1; 113.01	2; 181.33
20–23 February 2019	2019 Open Ice Mall Cup	2; 72.95	2; 104.44	2; 177.39
21–27 January 2019	2019 European Championships	11; 66.65	8; 108.97	9; 175.62
19–23 December 2018	2019 Russian Championships	4; 69.87	3; 109.34	3; 179.21
27 November – 1 December 2018	2018 Bosphorus Cup	2; 67.82	1; 109.89	1; 177.71
26 November – 2 December 2018	2018 CS Tallinn Trophy	4; 62.28	4; 106.03	4; 168.31
16–18 November 2018	2018 Rostelecom Cup	6; 64.05	4; 100.61	4; 164.66
18–21 October 2018	2018 Ice Star	2; 61.26	1; 106.86	1; 168.12
4–7 October 2018	2018 CS Finlandia Trophy	7; 61.33	7; 98.34	7; 159.67
2017–18 season
Date	Event	SD	FD	Total
21–24 December 2017	2018 Russian Championships	7; 62.18	5; 99.28	5; 161.46
21–26 November 2017	2017 CS Tallinn Trophy	3; 59.88	4; 90.40	4; 150.28
2016–17 season
Date	Event	SD	FD	Total
1–5 February 2017	2017 Winter Universiade	2; 63.96	2; 93.00	2; 156.96
22–25 December 2016	2017 Russian Championships	6; 60.85	6; 91.30	6; 152.15
7–10 December 2016	2016 CS Golden Spin of Zagreb	8; 56.80	10; 86.16	9; 142.96
18–20 November 2016	2016 Ice Star	3; 60.42	5; 90.34	3; 150.76
4–6 November 2016	2016 Rostelecom Cup	9; 55.83	9; 77.54	9; 133.37

2015–16 season
Date	Event	Level	SD	FD	Total
21–23 January 2016	2016 Russian Junior Championships	Junior	5; 60.15	5; 84.60	4; 144.75
9–11 October 2015	2015 Ice Star	Junior	1; 64.52	1; 91.73	1; 156.25
9–13 September 2015	2015 JGP Austria	Junior	5; 56.55	5; 81.05	5; 137.60
26–30 August 2015	2015 JGP Latvia	Junior	4; 54.29	4; 78.28	3; 132.57
2014–15 season
Date	Event	Level	SD	FD	Total
2–8 March 2015	2015 World Junior Championships	Junior	11; 50.44	10; 76.50	10; 126.94
4–7 February 2015	2015 Russian Junior Championships	Junior	5; 54.53	3; 86.03	3; 140.56
1–5 October 2014	2014 JGP Germany	Junior	5; 48.69	4; 77.85	4; 126.54
3–7 September 2014	2014 JGP Czech Republic	Junior	5; 47.51	3; 81.23	4; 128.74
