= Betina Popova =

Russian ice dancer (born 1996)

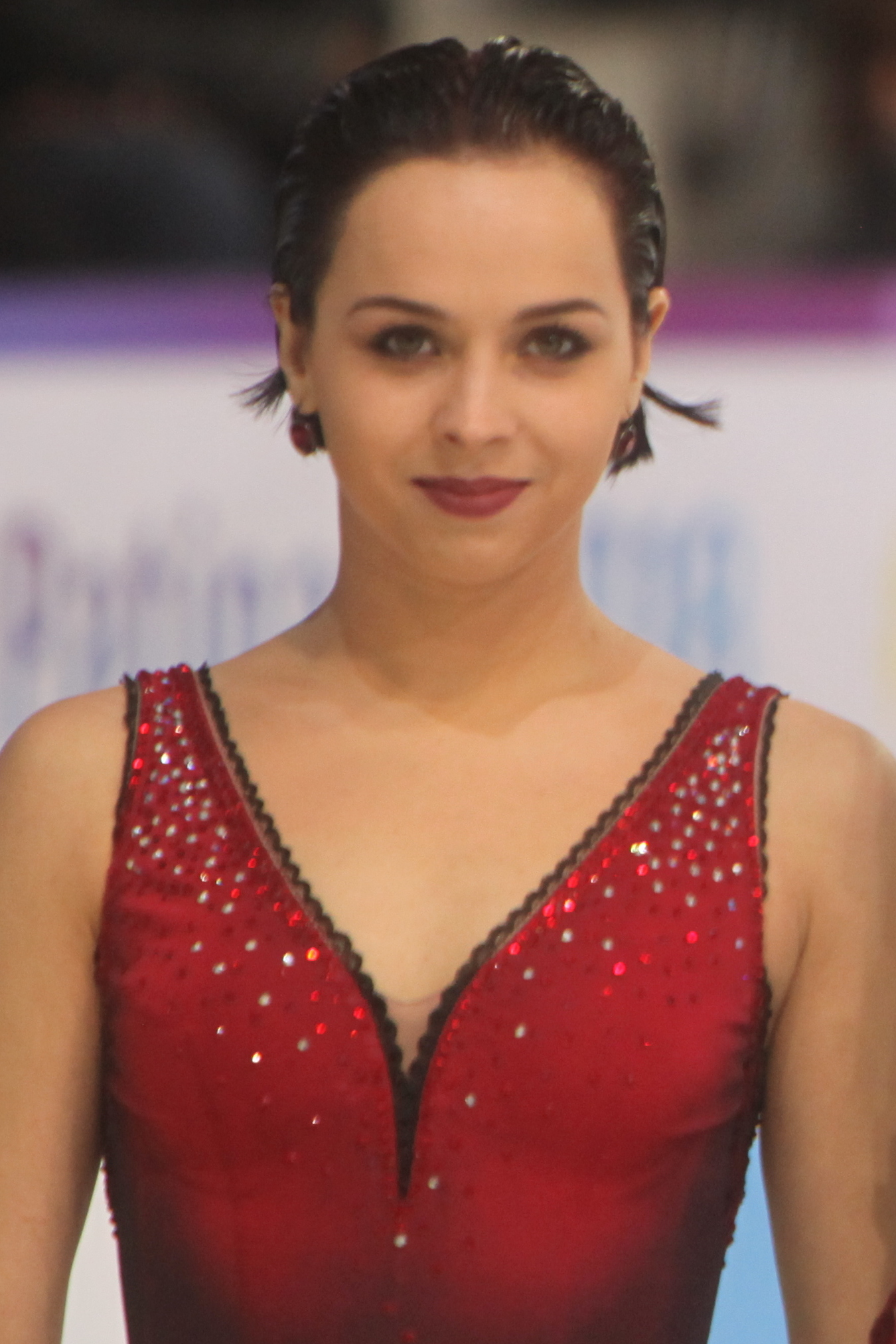
- Betina Popova in 2018 Internationaux de France

Personal information
- Full name: Betina Vadimovna Popova
- Born: 2 November 1996 (age 29) Vladivostok, Primorsky Krai, Russia
- Height: 1.68 m (5 ft 6 in)

Figure skating career
- Country: Russia
- Partner: Sergey Mozgov
- Coach: Anjelika Krylova, Oleg Volkov
- Began skating: 2002
- Retired: February 14, 2020
Medal record
Figure skating: Ice dancing
Representing Russia (with Mozgov)
Winter Universiade
Gold medal – first place	2019 Krasnoyarsk	Ice dancing
Representing Russia (with Vlasenko)
Junior Grand Prix Final
Bronze medal – third place	2014–15 Barcelona	Ice dancing

Betina Vadimovna Popova (Russian: Бетина Вадимовна Попова, born 2 November 1996) is a Russian retired competitive ice dancer. With partner Sergey Mozgov, she was the 2017 CS Warsaw Cup champion. With former partner Yuri Vlasenko, she was the 2014–15 JGP Final bronze medalist.

== Early life ==
Betina Vadimovna Popova was born on 2 November 1996 in Vladivostok, Primorsky Krai, Russia. She started skating in 2002. Her first coach was Marina Selitskaya.

== Partnership with Vlasenko ==
Popova and Yuri Vlasenko began competing together in 2009. The two were coached by Ksenia Rumiantseva and Ekaterina Zhurina at the Sambo-70 club in Moscow.

Popova/Vlasenko's international debut came at the 2011 NRW Trophy. They placed seventh at the Russian Junior Championships in the 2012–13 season.

=== 2013–14 season ===
Popova/Vlasenko made their ISU Junior Grand Prix debut in the 2013–14 season. They won the silver medal in Minsk, Belarus and then gold in Ostrava, Czech Republic. Their results qualified them for the JGP Final in Fukuoka, Japan, where they placed fourth. After taking the bronze medal at the 2014 Russian Junior Championships, the two were assigned to the 2014 World Junior Championships and finished seventh in Sofia, Bulgaria.

=== 2014–15 season ===
Popova/Vlasenko's first assignment of the 2014–15 JGP season was in Ostrava, Czech Republic. Ranked second in the short dance and fourth in the free dance, they finished second to Canada's Mackenzie Bent / Garrett MacKeen by a margin of 6.75 points. Popova/Vlasenko were awarded gold in Dresden, Germany after placing first in both segments and outscoring Lorraine McNamara / Quinn Carpenter of the United States by 7.96 points. At the 2014–15 JGP Final in Barcelona, they won the bronze medal behind Alla Loboda / Pavel Drozd. The two finished eleventh at the 2015 World Junior Championships in Tallinn, Estonia.

=== 2015–16 season ===
Competing in the 2015–16 JGP series, Popova/Vlasenko outscored Angélique Abachkina / Louis Thauron of France by 7.3 points for the gold in Riga, Latvia. They took silver at their JGP assignment in Logroño, Spain – finishing second to another French team, Marie-Jade Lauriault / Romain Le Gac, by a margin of 1.78 points – and qualified for their third JGP Final. At the final, held in December in Barcelona, Popova/Vlasenko finished fourth, having scored 0.45 less than the bronze medalists, Rachel Parsons / Michael Parsons of the United States. After taking silver behind Loboda/Drozd at the Russian Junior Championships, they were assigned to the World Junior Championships in Debrecen, Hungary.

== Partnership with Mozgov ==
On 2 May 2016, Popova confirmed that she and Sergey Mozgov had formed a partnership, with Elena Kustarova and Svetlana Alexeeva serving as their coaches.

Popova/Mozgov made their international debut at the 2016 CS Golden Spin of Zagreb where they placed fifth.

=== 2017–18 season ===
In 2017–18 season they competed at three ISU Challenger Series competitions. They won the gold medal at the 2017 CS Warsaw Cup with a personal best score of 164.07 points. They also won the bronze medal at the 2017 CS Ondrej Nepela Trophy. At the 2017 CS Finlandia Trophy they placed fifth.

In October 2017 they made their Grand Prix debut at the 2017 Rostelecom Cup where they placed sixth. In December 2017 they competed at the 2018 Russian Championships where they placed fourth after placing fifth in the short dance and third in the free dance.

In May 2018 Anjelika Krylova and Oleg Volkov became their new coaches.

=== 2018–19 season ===
Popova/Mozgov started their season in mid September at the 2018 CS Ondrej Nepela Trophy where they won the bronze medal with a personal best score of 170.47 points. In early November they placed seventh at the 2018 Grand Prix of Helsinki. Three weeks later they finished eighth at the 2018 Internationaux de France. In early December they won their second Challenger Series bronze medal of the season at the 2018 CS Golden Spin of Zagreb.

They placed fourth at the Russian Championships for the second consecutive year.

In March, Popova/Mozgov have participated in the 2019 Winter Universiade in Krasnoyarsk Russia. They finished first in the short and second in the free, earning the gold medal with a total of 183.01 points.

=== 2019–20 season ===
Popova/Mozgov took time off to heal injuries following their Universiade victory, and then resumed training for the new season. The two selected "Bohemian Rhapsody" as their free dance music, believing it would be a new sort of material for them. They placed fourth at the 2019 CS Ondrej Nepela Memorial and then won the bronze medal at the 2019 CS Finlandia Trophy. Given one Grand Prix assignment, they placed eighth at the 2019 Skate Canada International.

Popova/Mozgov announced their retirement from competition on February 14, 2020, with Popova indicating that she was dealing with an eating disorder.

== Post-competitive life and career ==
Popova began working as a skating choreographer in Moscow, including with the pairs team of Daria Pavliuchenko and Denis Khodykin. Popova and Khodykin married in August 2020, but did not announce this until the following May. However, they eventually divorced.

Popova indicated her disaffection with the realities of ice dancing at a young age, sharing in 2020 that she was asked to show “sex” and “passion” towards her older partner when she was fourteen.

== Programs ==
=== With Mozgov ===
Season	Rhythm dance	Free dance	Exhibition
2019–2020	Willkommen; Money Money; Mein Herr (from Cabaret) by John Kander & Fred Ebb	Bohemian Rhapsody by Queen	Nevesta by Mummly Troll
2018–2019	Tango: Volver by Maxime Rodriguez	The Master and Margarita by Igor Kornelyuk	Power Rangers soundtrack; Hafanana by Afric Simone
	Short dance		
2017–2018	Cha Cha; Rhumba: Formidable by Stromae; Samba: Batacuda Mixes performed by D.J. Dero	Carmen Suite by Georges Bizet	
2016–2017	Dream a Little Dream of Me; Rock n Roll	Going to the Run by Golden Earring; Black Betty	

=== With Vlasenko ===
Season	Short dance	Free dance
2015–2016	The Blizzard: Waltz by Georgy Sviridov; Feuerfest Polka francaise, opus 269 by Josef Strauss; The Master and Margarita by Igor Kornelyuk; Waltz: At Voland's Ball; March: Voland	Crazy in Love by Beyoncé
2014–2015	Cha Cha Danzon; Brazilian Samba	One Thousand and One Nights by Fikret Amirov
2013–2014	Jumpin' Jack by Big Bad Voodoo Daddy; Dream A Little Dream Of Me performed by Doris Day	Spartacus by Aram Khachaturian
2012–2013	Pon de Floor by Major Lazer and Vybz Kartel; Come Together by The Beatles performed by Petra Magoni; Run the World (Girls) by Beyoncé	Jesus Christ Superstar
2011–2012	Bla Bla Bla Cha Cha Cha by Petty Booka; Pasadena by Maywood	Tango medley

== Competitive highlights ==
GP: Grand Prix; CS: Challenger Series; JGP: Junior Grand Prix

=== With Mozgov ===
International
Event	16–17	17–18	18–19	19–20
GP Finland			7th	
GP France			8th	
GP Rostelecom Cup		6th		
GP Skate Canada				8th
CS Finlandia Trophy		5th		3rd
CS Golden Spin	5th		3rd	
CS Nepela Trophy		3rd	3rd	4th
CS Warsaw Cup		1st		
Volvo Open Cup			1st	
Universiade			1st	
National
Russian Champ.		4th	4th	
TBD = Assigned; WD = Withdrew

=== With Vlasenko ===
International
Event	10–11	11–12	12–13	13–14	14–15	15–16
Junior Worlds				7th	11th	6th
JGP Final				4th	3rd	4th
JGP Belarus				2nd		
JGP Czech Republic				1st	2nd	
JGP Germany					1st	
JGP Latvia						1st
JGP Spain						2nd
NRW Trophy		4th J	8th J			
National
Russian Jr. Champ.	14th	12th	7th	3rd	2nd	2nd
J = Junior level

== Detailed results ==
Small medals for short and free programs awarded only at ISU Championships. At team events, medals awarded for team results only.

=== With Mozgov ===
2019–20 season
Date	Event	RD	FD	Total
25–27 October 2019	2019 Skate Canada	6; 71.44	8; 102.10	8; 173.54
11–13 October 2019	2019 CS Finlandia Trophy	2; 72.11	3; 103.13	3; 175.24
19–21 September 2019	2019 CS Ondrej Nepela Memorial	4; 73.30	5; 100.82	4; 174.12
2018–19 season
Date	Event	RD	FD	Total
7–9 March 2019	2019 Winter Universiade	1; 71.46	2; 111.55	1; 183.01
19–23 December 2018	2019 Russian Championships	5; 69.62	4; 107.31	4; 176.93
5–8 December 2018	2018 CS Golden Spin of Zagreb	5; 62.84	3; 102.89	3; 165.73
23–25 November 2018	2018 Internationaux de France	8; 63.64	7; 99.54	8; 163.18
6–11 November 2018	2018 Volvo Open Cup	1; 64.31	1; 104.16	1; 168.47
2–4 November 2018	2018 Grand Prix of Helsinki	7; 62.35	8; 95.21	7; 157.56
19–22 September 2018	2018 CS Ondrej Nepela Trophy	3; 67.65	3; 102.82	3; 170.47
2017–18 season
Date	Event	SD	FD	Total
21–24 December 2017	2018 Russian Championships	5; 63.27	3; 104.43	4; 167.70
16–19 November 2017	2017 CS Warsaw Cup	1; 64.38	1; 99.69	1; 164.07
20–22 October 2017	2017 Rostelecom Cup	6; 64.14	6; 99.88	6; 164.02
6–8 October 2017	2017 CS Finlandia Trophy	7; 57.36	3; 94.92	5; 152.28
21–23 September 2017	2017 CS Ondrej Nepela Trophy	3; 60.98	2; 100.94	3; 161.92
2016–17 season
Date	Event	SD	FD	Total
7–10 December 2016	2016 CS Golden Spin of Zagreb	4; 60.70	5; 94.52	5; 155.22

=== With Vlasenko ===
2015–16 season
Date	Event	Level	SD	FD	Total
14–20 March 2016	2016 World Junior Championships	Junior	7; 58.56	5; 87.65	6; 146.21
19–23 January 2016	2016 Russian Junior Championships	Junior	4; 61.62	1; 96.20	2; 157.82
10–13 December 2015	2015−16 JGP Final	Junior	4; 61.85	4; 82.11	4; 143.96
30 September – 4 October 2015	2015 JGP Spain	Junior	2; 60.40	2; 90.54	2; 150.94
26–30 August 2015	2015 JGP Latvia	Junior	1; 59.82	1; 86.53	1; 146.35
2014–15 season
Date	Event	Level	SD	FD	Total
2–8 March 2015	2015 World Junior Championships	Junior	9; 51.17	11; 74.26	11; 125.43
4–7 February 2015	2015 Russian Junior Championships	Junior	3; 58.06	2; 89.93	2; 147.99
11–14 December 2014	2014–15 JGP Final	Junior	3; 50.52	3; 81.36	3; 131.88
1–5 October 2014	2014 JGP Germany	Junior	1; 59.91	1; 87.40	1; 147.31
3–7 September 2014	2014 JGP Czech Republic	Junior	2; 52.42	4; 79.00	2; 131.42
2013–14 season
Date	Event	Level	SD	FD	Total
10–16 March 2014	2014 World Junior Championships	Junior	8; 53.29	6; 79.18	7; 132.47
23–25 January 2014	2014 Russian Junior Championships	Junior	4; 60.31	4; 86.09	3; 146.40
5–8 December 2013	2013–14 JGP Final	Junior	4; 52.50	4; 76.97	4; 129.47
3–5 October 2013	2013 JGP Czech Republic	Junior	4; 53.48	1; 81.68	1; 135.16
26–28 September 2013	2013 JGP Belarus	Junior	3; 51.82	2; 76.89	2; 128.71
