= Yuri Vlasenko =

Russian ice dancer (born 1994)

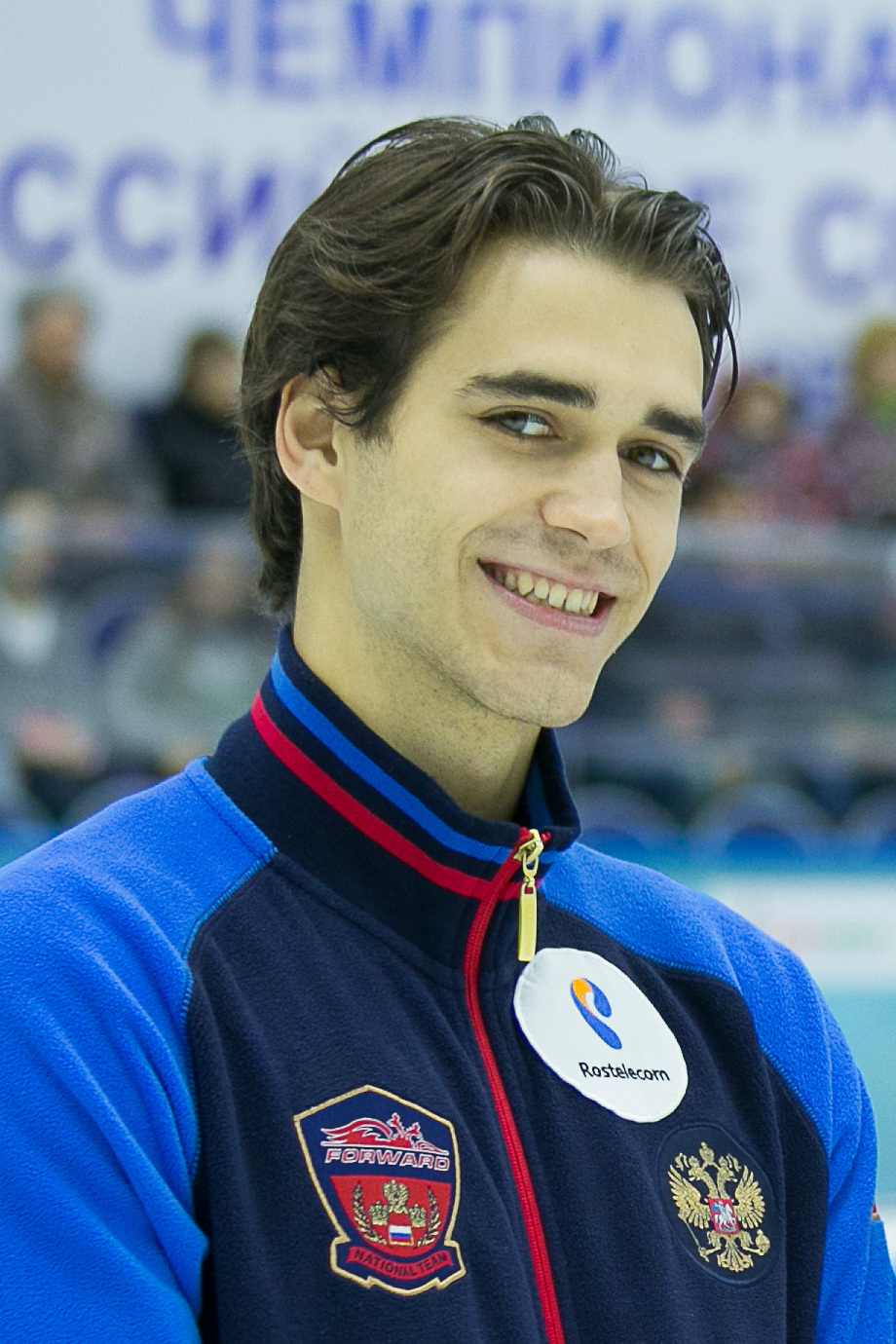
- Vlasenko in November 2015

Personal information
- Full name: Yuri Vladimirovich Vlasenko
- Born: 20 November 1994 (age 31) Kharkiv, Ukraine
- Height: 1.83 m (6 ft 0 in)

Figure skating career
- Country: United States, Russia
- Partner: Lydia Erdman
- Coach: Ksenia Rumiantseva, Ekaterina Volobueva
- Skating club: Sambo 70
Medal record
Representing Russia
Figure skating: Ice dancing
Junior Grand Prix Final
Bronze medal – third place	2014–15 Barcelona	Ice dancing

Yuri Vladimirovich Vlasenko (Russian: Юрий Владимирович Власенко, born 20 November 1994) is a Russian ice dancer. With former partner Betina Popova, he is the 2014–15 JGP Final bronze medalist.

== Personal life ==
Yuri Vladimirovich Vlasenko was born on 20 November 1994 in Kharkiv, Ukraine.

== Career ==
Vlasenko and Betina Popova began competing together in 2009. The two were coached by Ksenia Rumiantseva and Ekaterina Zhurina at the Sambo-70 club in Moscow.

Popova/Vlasenko's international debut came at the 2011 NRW Trophy. They placed 7th at the Russian Junior Championships in the 2012–13 season.

=== 2013–14 season ===
Popova/Vlasenko made their ISU Junior Grand Prix debut in the 2013–14 season. They won the silver medal in Minsk, Belarus and then gold in Ostrava, Czech Republic. Their results qualified them for the JGP Final in Fukuoka, Japan, where they placed fourth. After taking the bronze medal at the 2014 Russian Junior Championships, the two were assigned to the 2014 World Junior Championships and finished seventh in Sofia, Bulgaria.

=== 2014–15 season ===
Popova/Vlasenko's first assignment of the 2014–15 JGP season was in Ostrava, Czech Republic. Ranked second in the short dance and fourth in the free dance, they finished second to Canada's Mackenzie Bent / Garrett MacKeen by a margin of 6.75 points. Popova/Vlasenko were awarded gold in Dresden, Germany after placing first in both segments and outscoring Lorraine McNamara / Quinn Carpenter of the United States by 7.96 points. At the 2014–15 JGP Final in Barcelona, they won the bronze medal behind Alla Loboda / Pavel Drozd. The two finished 11th at the 2015 World Junior Championships in Tallinn, Estonia.

=== 2015–16 season ===
Competing in the 2015–16 JGP series, Popova/Vlasenko outscored Angélique Abachkina / Louis Thauron of France by 7.3 points for the gold in Riga, Latvia. They took silver at their JGP assignment in Logroño, Spain – finishing second to another French team, Marie-Jade Lauriault / Romain Le Gac, by a margin of 1.78 points – and qualified for their third JGP Final. At the final, held in December in Barcelona, Popova/Vlasenko finished fourth, having scored 0.45 less than the bronze medalists, Rachel Parsons / Michael Parsons of the United States. After taking silver behind Loboda/Drozd at the Russian Junior Championships, they were assigned to the World Junior Championships in Debrecen, Hungary.

Their partnership ended by May 2016.

== Programs ==
(with Popova)

Season	Short dance	Free dance
2015–2016	The Blizzard: Waltz by Georgy Sviridov; Feuerfest Polka francaise, opus 269 by Josef Strauss; The Master and Margarita by Igor Kornelyuk; Waltz: At Voland's Ball; March: Voland	Crazy in Love by Beyoncé
2014–2015	Cha Cha Danzon; Brazilian Samba	One Thousand and One Nights by Fikret Amirov
2013–2014	Jumpin' Jack by Big Bad Voodoo Daddy; Dream A Little Dream Of Me performed by Doris Day	Spartacus by Aram Khachaturian
2012–2013	Pon de Floor by Major Lazer and Vybz Kartel; Come Together by The Beatles performed by Petra Magoni; Run the World (Girls) by Beyoncé	Jesus Christ Superstar
2011–2012	Bla Bla Bla Cha Cha Cha by Petty Booka; Pasadena by Maywood	Tango medley

== Competitive highlights ==
CS: Challenger Series; JGP: Junior Grand Prix

=== With Erdman ===
National
Event	2018–19
U.S. Championships	8th

=== With Solovieva ===
International
Event	2017–18
CS Minsk-Arena Ice Star	11th
Volvo Open Cup	5th
National
Russian Championships	7th

=== With Popova ===
International
Event	10–11	11–12	12–13	13–14	14–15	15–16
Junior Worlds				7th	11th	6th
JGP Final				4th	3rd	4th
JGP Belarus				2nd		
JGP Czech Rep.				1st	2nd	
JGP Germany					1st	
JGP Latvia						1st
JGP Spain						2nd
NRW Trophy		4th J	8th J			
National
Russian Jr. Champ.	14th	12th	7th	3rd	2nd	2nd
J: Junior level

== Detailed results ==
Small medals for short and free programs awarded only at ISU Championships. At team events, medals awarded for team results only.

With Popova

2015–16 season
Date	Event	Level	SD	FD	Total
14–20 March 2016	2016 World Junior Championships	Junior	7; 58.56	5; 87.65	6; 146.21
19–23 January 2016	2016 Russian Junior Championships	Junior	4; 61.62	1; 96.20	2; 157.82
10–13 December 2015	2015−16 JGP Final	Junior	4; 61.85	4; 82.11	4; 143.96
30 September – 4 October 2015	2015 JGP Spain	Junior	2; 60.40	2; 90.54	2; 150.94
26–30 August 2015	2015 JGP Latvia	Junior	1; 59.82	1; 86.53	1; 146.35
2014–15 season
Date	Event	Level	SD	FD	Total
2–8 March 2015	2015 World Junior Championships	Junior	9; 51.17	11; 74.26	11; 125.43
4–7 February 2015	2015 Russian Junior Championships	Junior	3; 58.06	2; 89.93	2; 147.99
11–14 December 2014	2014–15 JGP Final	Junior	3; 50.52	3; 81.36	3; 131.88
1–5 October 2014	2014 JGP Germany	Junior	1; 59.91	1; 87.40	1; 147.31
3–7 September 2014	2014 JGP Czech Republic	Junior	2; 52.42	4; 79.00	2; 131.42
2013–14 season
Date	Event	Level	SD	FD	Total
10–16 March 2014	2014 World Junior Championships	Junior	8; 53.29	6; 79.18	7; 132.47
23–25 January 2014	2014 Russian Junior Championships	Junior	4; 60.31	4; 86.09	3; 146.40
5–8 December 2013	2013–14 JGP Final	Junior	4; 52.50	4; 76.97	4; 129.47
3–5 October 2013	2013 JGP Czech Republic	Junior	4; 53.48	1; 81.68	1; 135.16
26–28 September 2013	2013 JGP Belarus	Junior	3; 51.82	2; 76.89	2; 128.71
