= Spanish Grand Prix (disambiguation) =

Spanish Grand Prix or Spain Grand Prix can refer to:

- Spanish Grand Prix, a Formula One motor race
  - Individual races can be found via Category:Spanish Grand Prix
- Spanish motorcycle Grand Prix
  - Individual races can be found via Category:Spanish motorcycle Grand Prix
- K-1 Spain Grand Prix 2003 in Barcelona, a kickboxing event

== See also ==
- ISU Junior Grand Prix in Spain, a figure skating event
