= ISU Junior Grand Prix in Spain =

International figure skating competition

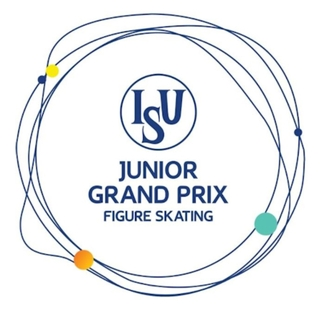
- Genre: ISU Junior Grand Prix
- Location: Spain
- Most recent: 2015

The ISU Junior Grand Prix in Spain (originally called the Madrid Cup) is an international figure skating competition sanctioned by the International Skating Union (ISU), organized and hosted by the Figure Skating Federation of Armenia. It is held periodically as an event of the Spanish Ice Sports Federation (Spanish: Real Federación Española de Deportes de Hielo) (JGP), a series of international competitions exclusively for junior-level skaters. Medals may be awarded in men's singles, women's singles, pair skating, and ice dance. Skaters earn points based on their results at the qualifying competitions each season, and the top skaters or teams in each discipline are invited to then compete at the Junior Grand Prix of Figure Skating Final.

== History ==
The ISU Junior Grand Prix of Figure Skating (JGP) was established by the International Skating Union (ISU) in 1997 and consists of a series of seven international figure skating competitions exclusively for junior-level skaters. The locations of the Junior Grand Prix events change every year. While all seven competitions feature the men's, women's, and ice dance events, only four competitions each season feature the pairs event. Skaters earn points based on their results each season, and the top skaters or teams in each discipline are then invited to compete at the Junior Grand Prix of Figure Skating Final.

Skaters are eligible to compete on the junior-level circuit if they are at least 13 years old before 1 July of the respective season, but not yet 19 (for single skaters), 21 (for men and women in ice dance and women in pair skating), or 23 (for men in pair skating). Competitors are chosen by their respective skating federations. The number of entries allotted to each ISU member nation in each discipline is determined by their results at the prior World Junior Figure Skating Championships.

== Results ==
=== Men's singles ===
| Year | Location | Gold | Silver | Bronze | Ref. |
|---|---|---|---|---|---|
| 2008 | Madrid | (United States) Armin Mahbanoozadeh | (Russia) Artur Gachinski | (Japan) Tatsuki Machida | |
| 2014 Final | Barcelona | (Japan) Shoma Uno | (Japan) Sota Yamamoto | (Russia) Alexander Petrov | |
| 2015 | Logroño | (United States) Nathan Chen | (Israel) Daniel Samohin | (China) Zhang He | |
| 2015 Final | Barcelona | (United States) Nathan Chen | (Russia) Dmitri Aliev | (Japan) Sota Yamamoto | |

=== Women's singles ===
| Year | Location | Gold | Silver | Bronze | Ref. |
|---|---|---|---|---|---|
| 2008 | Madrid | (United States) Kristine Musademba | (United States) Becky Bereswill | (Japan) Kanako Murakami | |
| 2014 Final | Barcelona | (Russia) Evgenia Medvedeva | (Russia) Serafima Sakhanovich | (Japan) Wakaba Higuchi | |
| 2015 | Logroño | (Japan) Yuna Shiraiwa | (Russia) Alisa Fedichkina | (Japan) Yura Matsuda | |
| 2015 Final | Barcelona | (Russia) Polina Tsurskaya | (Russia) Maria Sotskova | (Japan) Marin Honda | |

=== Pairs ===
| Year | Location | Gold | Silver | Bronze | Ref. |
|---|---|---|---|---|---|
| 2014 Final | Barcelona | (Canada); Julianne Séguin; Charlie Bilodeau | (Russia); Lina Fedorova; Maxim Miroshkin | (Russia); Maria Vigalova; Egor Zakroev | |
| 2015 Final | Barcelona | (Russia); Ekaterina Borisova; Dmitry Sopot | (Czech Republic); Anna Dušková; Martin Bidař | (Russia); Amina Atakhanova; Ilia Spiridonov | |

=== Ice dance ===
| Year | Location | Gold | Silver | Bronze | Ref. |
|---|---|---|---|---|---|
| 2008 | Madrid | (Russia); Ekaterina Riazanova; Jonathan Guerreiro | (United States); Maia Shibutani; Alex Shibutani | (Ukraine); Anastasia Vykhodtseva; Alexei Shumski | |
| 2014 Final | Barcelona | (Russia); Anna Yanovskaya; Sergey Mozgov | (Russia); Alla Loboda; Pavel Drozd | (Russia); Betina Popova; Yuri Vlasenko | |
| 2015 | Logroño | (France); Marie-Jade Lauriault; Romain Le Gac | (Russia); Betina Popova; Yuri Vlasenko | (United States); Elliana Pogrebinsky; Alex Benoit | |
| 2015 Final | Barcelona | (United States); Lorraine McNamara; Quinn Carpenter | (Russia); Alla Loboda; Pavel Drozd | (United States); Rachel Parsons; Michael Parsons | |
