= 2013–14 ISU Junior Grand Prix =

- Type: ISU Junior Grand Prix
- Date: August 29 – December 8, 2013
- Season: 2013–14
- Previous: 2012–13 ISU Junior Grand Prix
- Next: 2014–15 ISU Junior Grand Prix

The 2013–14 ISU Junior Grand Prix was the 17th season of a series of junior international competitions organized by the International Skating Union. It was the junior-level complement to the 2013–14 ISU Grand Prix of Figure Skating, in which senior-level skaters will compete. Medals were awarded in the disciplines of men's singles, ladies' singles, pair skating, and ice dance.

Skaters earn points toward qualifying for the final at each of the seven Junior Grand Prix events. The top six skaters or teams from each discipline meet at the 2013–14 Junior Grand Prix Final, to be held concurrently with the senior final.

== Competitions ==
The locations of the JGP events change yearly. In the 2013–14 season, the series was composed of the following events in autumn 2013:

Date	Event	Location	Details	Other notes
August 29–31	2013 JGP Riga Cup	Riga, Latvia	Results (Detailed)	
September 5–7	2013 JGP Mexico Cup	Mexico City, Mexico	Results (Detailed)	No pairs
September 12–14	2013 JGP Kosice	Košice, Slovakia	Results (Detailed) Event website	
September 19–21	2013 JGP Baltic Cup	Gdańsk, Poland	Results (Detailed)	No pairs
September 26–28	2013 JGP Minsk	Minsk, Belarus	Results (Detailed)	
October 3–5	2013 JGP Czech Skate	Ostrava, Czech Republic	Entries (Detailed) Event website	
October 10–12	2013 JGP Tallinn Cup	Tallinn, Estonia	Entries (Detailed)	
December 5–8	2013–14 Junior Grand Prix Final	Fukuoka, Japan		Held with senior GPF

== Qualifying ==
Skaters who reach the age of 13 by July 1, 2013 but have not turned 19 (singles and females of the other two disciplines) or 21 (male pair skaters and ice dancers) are eligible to compete on the junior circuit. Unlike the senior Grand Prix, skaters for the JGP are not seeded by the ISU. The number of entries allotted to each ISU member federation is determined by their skaters' placements at the previous season's Junior World Championships in each respective discipline.

== Medalists ==
=== Men ===
Competition	Gold	Silver	Bronze	Details
JGP Latvia	(China) Jin Boyang	(Russia) Adian Pitkeev	(Japan) Shoma Uno	
JGP Mexico	(United States) Nathan Chen	(Japan) Ryuju Hino	(Israel) Daniel Samohin	
JGP Slovakia	(Japan) Keiji Tanaka	(China) Zhang He	(Russia) Mikhail Kolyada	
JGP Poland	(Russia) Adian Pitkeev	(Russia) Alexander Petrov	(China) Zhang He	
JGP Belarus	(United States) Nathan Chen	(Japan) Ryuju Hino	(Russia) Murad Kurbanov	
JGP Czech Rep.	(Japan) Keiji Tanaka	(Russia) Alexander Petrov	(Russia) Moris Kvitelashvili	
JGP Estonia	(China) Jin Boyang	(Russia) Mikhail Kolyada	(Philippines) Michael Christian Martinez	
JGP Final	(China) Jin Boyang	(Russia) Adian Pitkeev	(United States) Nathan Chen	

=== Ladies ===
Competition	Gold	Silver	Bronze	Details
JGP Latvia	(Russia) Evgenia Medvedeva	(Russia) Maria Sotskova	(United States) Karen Chen	
JGP Mexico	(United States) Polina Edmunds	(Russia) Natalia Ogoreltseva	(United States) Mariah Bell	
JGP Slovakia	(United States) Karen Chen	(Russia) Alexandra Proklova	(Japan) Riona Kato	
JGP Poland	(Russia) Evgenia Medvedeva	(United States) Angela Wang	(Canada) Gabrielle Daleman	
JGP Belarus	(United States) Polina Edmunds	(Kazakhstan) Elizabet Tursynbayeva	(Japan) Rika Hongo	
JGP Czech Rep.	(Russia) Alexandra Proklova	(Russia) Maria Sotskova	(United States) Amber Glenn	
JGP Estonia	(Russia) Serafima Sakhanovich	(Russia) Elizaveta Iushenko	(Japan) Miyabi Oba	
JGP Final	(Russia) Maria Sotskova	(Russia) Serafima Sakhanovich	(Russia) Evgenia Medvedeva	

=== Pairs ===
Competition	Gold	Silver	Bronze	Details
JGP Latvia	(China) Yu Xiaoyu / Jin Yang	(Russia) Evgenia Tarasova / Vladimir Morozov	(Russia) Maria Vigalova / Egor Zakroev	
JGP Slovakia	(Russia) Maria Vigalova / Egor Zakroev	(Russia) Lina Fedorova / Maxim Miroshkin	(Russia) ~~Oksana Nagalati / Maxim Bobrov~~^{†} (Italy) Alessandra Cernuschi / Filippo Ambrosini	
JGP Belarus	(Russia) Kamilla Gainetdinova / Ivan Bich	(United States) Madeline Aaron / Max Settlage	(Russia) Vasilisa Davankova / Andrei Deputat	
JGP Czech Rep.	(Russia) Lina Fedorova / Maxim Miroshkin	(Russia) Arina Cherniavskaia / Antonio Souza-Kordeyru	(Russia) Kamilla Gainetdinova / Ivan Bich	
JGP Estonia	(China) Yu Xiaoyu / Jin Yang	(Russia) Vasilisa Davankova / Andrei Deputat	(Russia) Evgenia Tarasova / Vladimir Morozov	
JGP Final	(China) Yu Xiaoyu / Jin Yang	(Russia) Maria Vigalova / Egor Zakroev	(Russia) Lina Fedorova / Maxim Miroshkin	

^{†}Nagalati / Bobrov were later disqualified from the competition due to a positive doping sample from Nagalati.

=== Ice dance ===
Competition	Gold	Silver	Bronze	Details
JGP Latvia	(Canada) Mackenzie Bent / Garrett MacKeen	(United States) Lorraine McNamara / Quinn Carpenter	(Russia) Alla Loboda / Pavel Drozd	
JGP Mexico	(United States) Kaitlin Hawayek / Jean-Luc Baker	(Canada) Madeline Edwards / Zhao Kai Pang	(Russia) Sofia Evdokimova / Egor Bazin	
JGP Slovakia	(Russia) Anna Yanovskaya / Sergey Mozgov	(United States) Rachel Parsons / Michael Parsons	(United States) Holly Moore / Daniel Klaber	
JGP Poland	(United States) Kaitlin Hawayek / Jean-Luc Baker	(Ukraine) Oleksandra Nazarova / Maxim Nikitin	(Russia) Alla Loboda / Pavel Drozd	
JGP Belarus	(United States) Lorraine McNamara / Quinn Carpenter	(Russia) Betina Popova / Yuri Vlasenko	(Russia) Daria Morozova / Mikhail Zhirnov	
JGP Czech Rep.	(Russia) Betina Popova / Yuri Vlasenko	(United States) Rachel Parsons / Michael Parsons	(Canada) Madeline Edwards / Zhao Kai Pang	
JGP Estonia	(Russia) Anna Yanovskaya / Sergey Mozgov	(Ukraine) Oleksandra Nazarova / Maxim Nikitin	(Russia) Daria Morozova / Mikhail Zhirnov	
JGP Final	(Russia) Anna Yanovskaya / Sergey Mozgov	(United States) Kaitlin Hawayek / Jean-Luc Baker	(United States) Lorraine McNamara / Quinn Carpenter	

== Medals table ==
Rank	Nation	Gold	Silver	Bronze	Total
1	Russia (RUS)	13	17	14	44
2	United States (USA)	8	6	6	20
3	China (CHN)	6	1	1	8
4	Japan (JPN)	2	2	4	8
5	Canada (CAN)	1	1	2	4
6	Ukraine (UKR)	0	2	0	2
7	Kazakhstan (KAZ)	0	1	0	1
8	Israel (ISR)	0	0	1	1
8	Italy (ITA)	0	0	1	1
8	Philippines (PHI)	0	0	1	1
Totals (10 entries)		30	30	30	90

== JGP Final qualification standings ==
=== Qualification rules ===
At each event, skaters earn points toward qualification for the Junior Grand Prix Final. Following the 7th event, the top six highest scoring skaters advance to the Final. The points earned per placement are as follows:

Placement	Points (Singles/Dance)	Points (Pairs)
1st	15	15
2nd	13	13
3rd	11	11
4th	9	9
5th	7	7
6th	5	5
7th	4	4
8th	3	3
9th	2	–
10th	1	–

There are seven tie-breakers in cases of a tie in overall points:

1. Highest placement at an event. If a skater placed 1st and 3rd, the tiebreaker is the 1st place, and that beats a skater who placed 2nd in both events.
2. Highest combined total scores in both events. If a skater earned 200 points at one event and 250 at a second, that skater would win in the second tie-break over a skater who earned 200 points at one event and 150 at another.
3. Participated in two events.
4. Highest combined scores in the free skating/free dance portion of both events.
5. Highest individual score in the free skating/free dance portion from one event.
6. Highest combined scores in the short program/short dance of both events.
7. Highest number of total participants at the events.

If there is still a tie, it is considered unbreakable and the tied skaters all advance to the Junior Grand Prix Final.

=== Qualifiers ===
	Men	Ladies	Pairs	Ice dance
1	(United States) Nathan Chen	(Russia) Evgenia Medvedeva	(China) Yu Xiaoyu / Jin Yang	(Russia) Anna Yanovskaya / Sergey Mozgov
2	(Japan) Keiji Tanaka	(United States) Polina Edmunds	(Russia) Lina Fedorova / Maxim Miroshkin	(United States) Kaitlin Hawayek / Jean-Luc Baker
3	(China) Jin Boyang	(Russia) Alexandra Proklova	(Russia) Maria Vigalova / Egor Zakroev	(United States) Lorraine McNamara / Quinn Carpenter
4	(Russia) Adian Pitkeev	(United States) Karen Chen	(Russia) Kamilla Gainetdinova / Ivan Bich	(Russia) Betina Popova / Yuri Vlasenko
5	(Russia) Alexander Petrov	(Russia) Maria Sotskova	(Russia) Evgenia Tarasova / Vladimir Morozov	(Ukraine) Oleksandra Nazarova / Maxim Nikitin
6	(Japan) Ryuju Hino	(Russia) Serafima Sakhanovich	(Russia) Vasilisa Davankova / Andrei Deputat	(United States) Rachel Parsons / Michael Parsons
Alternates
1st	(Russia) Mikhail Kolyada	(United States) Angela Wang	(United States) Madeline Aaron / Max Settlage	(Canada) Madeline Edwards / Zhao Kai Pang
2nd	(China) Zhang He	(Kazakhstan) Elizabet Tursynbayeva	(Russia) Arina Cherniavskaia / Antonio Souza-Kordeyru	(Russia) Alla Loboda / Pavel Drozd
3rd	(Japan) Shoma Uno	(Japan) Riona Kato	(Russia) Oksana Nagalati / Maxim Bobrov	(Russia) Daria Morozova / Mikhail Zhirnov

== Top scores ==
Top scores attained in Junior Grand Prix competitions.

=== Men ===
Rank	Name	Country	Total	Event
1	Nathan Chen	United States	218.62	JGP Mexico
2	Adian Pitkeev	Russia	213.89	JGP Poland
3	Boyang Jin	China	210.85	JGP Estonia
4	Keiji Tanaka	Japan	210.02	JGP Czech Rep
5	Alexander Petrov	Russia	203.44	JGP Czech Rep
6	Mikhail Kolyada	Russia	201.26	JGP Estonia
7	Ryuju Hino	Japan	199.64	JGP Mexico
8	Michael Christian Martinez	Philippines	198.82	JGP Estonia
9	Shoma Uno	Japan	197.82	JGP Estonia
10	He Zhang	China	191.16	JGP Slovakia

=== Ladies ===
Rank	Name	Country	Total	Event
1	Alexandra Proklova	Russia	181.18	JGP Czech Rep
2	Evgenia Medvedeva	Russia	179.96	JGP Poland
3	Karen Chen	United States	179.08	JGP Slovakia
4	Polina Edmunds	United States	171.21	JGP Mexico
5	Maria Sotskova	Russia	166.49	JGP Latvia
6	Riona Kato	Japan	165.09	JGP Slovakia
7	Serafima Sakhanovich	Russia	164.48	JGP Estonia
8	Amber Glenn	United States	164.18	JGP Czech Rep
9	Elizaveta Iushenko	Russia	159.86	JGP Estonia
10	Angela Wang	United States	155.87	JGP Czech Rep

=== Pairs ===
Rank	Name	Country	Total	Event
1	Xiaoyu Yu / Yang Jin	China	173.58	JGP Estonia
2	Maria Vigalova / Egor Zakroev	Russia	168.10	JGP Slovakia
3	Vasilisa Davankova / Andrei Deputat	Russia	161.03	JGP Estonia
4	Evgenia Tarasova / Vladimir Morozov	Russia	157.82	JGP Latvia
5	Lina Fedorova / Maxim Miroshkin	Russia	153.95	JGP Slovakia
6	Arina Cherniavskaia / Antonio Souza-Kordeyru	Russia	144.23	JGP Czech Rep
7	Kamilla Gainetdinova / Ivan Bich	Russia	142.84	JGP Czech Rep
8	Madeline Aaron / Max Settlage	United States	141.79	JGP Estonia
9	Julianne Séguin / Charlie Bilodeau	Canada	141.18	JGP Czech Rep
10	Chelsea Liu / Devin Perini	United States	134.33	JGP Czech Rep

=== Ice dance ===
Rank	Name	Country	Total	Event
1	Anna Yanovskaia / Sergey Mozgov	Russia	149.98	JGP Estonia
2	Kaitlin Hawayek / Jean-Luc Baker	United States	144.84	JGP Poland
3	Lorraine McNamara / Quinn Carpenter	United States	137.97	JGP Belarus
4	Oleksandra Nazarova / Maxim Nikitin	Ukraine	135.22	JGP Poland
5	Betina Popova / Yuri Vlasenko	Russia	135.16	JGP Czech Rep
6	Rachel Parsons / Michael Parsons	United States	134.73	JGP Czech Rep
7	Alla Loboda / Pavel Drozd	Russia	134.11	JGP Poland
8	Madeline Edwards / Zhao Kai Pang	Canada	134.02	JGP Mexico
9	Evgenia Kosigina / Nikolai Moroshkin	Russia	130.16	JGP Poland
10	Sofia Evdokimova / Egor Bazin	Russia	129.82	JGP Czech Rep
