= Mackenzie Bent =

Canadian ice dancer (born 1997)

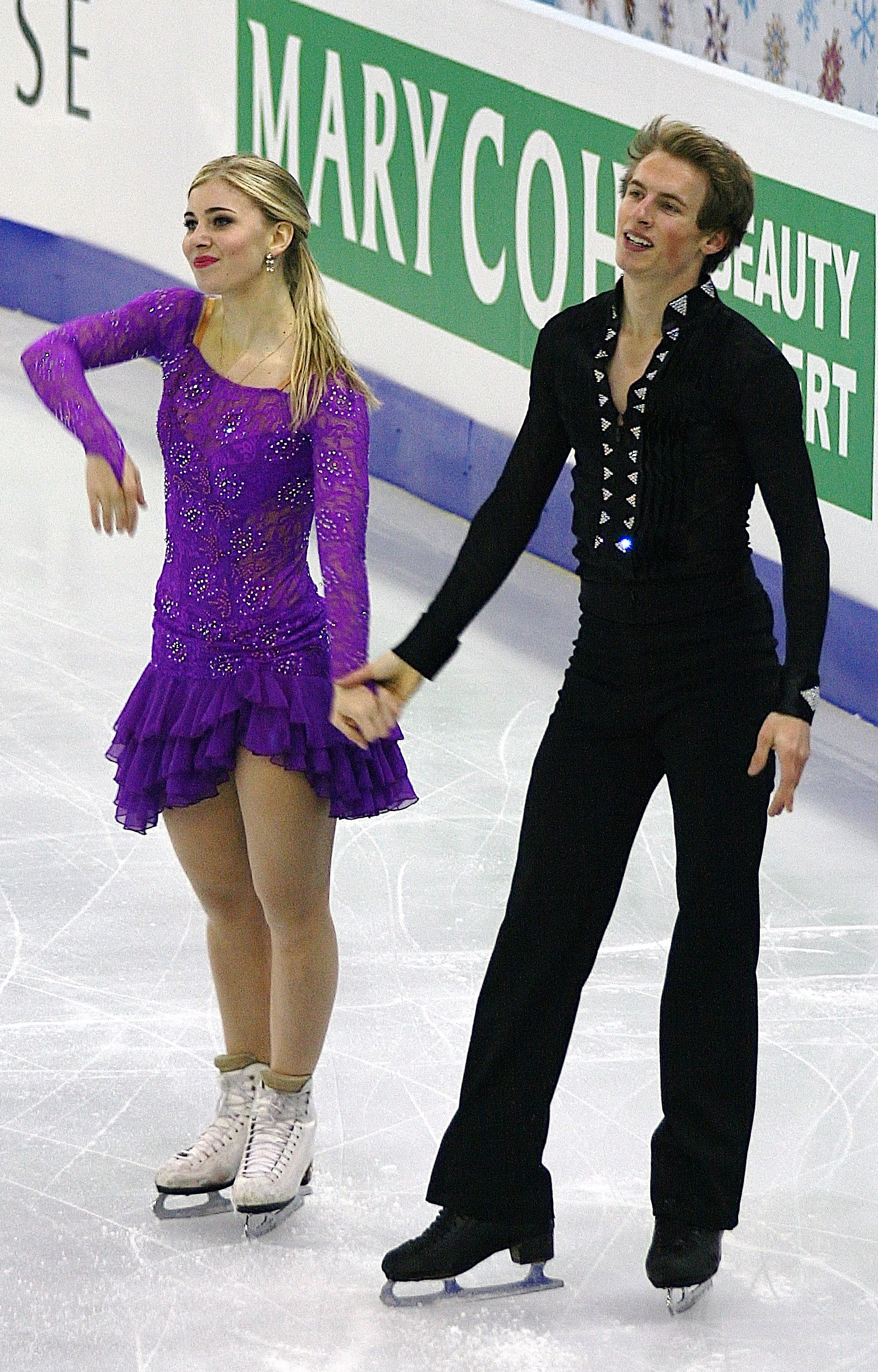
- Mackenzie Bent in 2014, with Garrett MacKeen

Personal information
- Born: June 11, 1997 (age 29) Port Perry, Ontario
- Home town: Uxbridge, Ontario
- Height: 1.62 m (5 ft 4 in)

Figure skating career
- Country: Canada
- Partner: Dmitre Razgulajevs
- Coach: Carol Lane, Jon Lane, Juris Razgulajevs
- Skating club: Uxbridge FSC; Scarborough FSC
- Began skating: 2000

Mackenzie Bent (born June 11, 1997) is a Canadian ice dancer. With partner Dmitre Razgulajevs, she is the 2016 Canadian junior champion. With former partner Garrett MacKeen, she is the 2014 Canadian junior champion and finished 5th at two World Junior Championships.

== Personal life ==
Mackenzie Bent was born on June 11, 1997, in Port Perry, Ontario, Canada. In 2016, she studied international relations at the University of Toronto.

== Career ==
=== Partnership with MacKeen ===
Bent/MacKeen won the novice bronze medal at the Canadian Championships in January 2011. Making their ISU Junior Grand Prix (JGP) debut, they took the bronze medal in Braşov, Romania in September of the same year. They placed fifth at their second JGP assignment, in Tallinn, Estonia, and fourth on the junior level at the 2012 Canadian Championships.

Bent/MacKeen returned to the JGP series in 2012–13, winning a bronze medal in Linz, Austria and placing fourth in Zagreb, Croatia. Junior silver medalists at the 2013 Canadian Championships, they were named in Canada's team to the 2013 World Junior Championships in Milan, Italy. Ranked fourth in the short dance and seventh in the free dance, they finished fifth overall in their debut at the competition.

Competing in the 2013–14 JGP series, Bent/MacKeen won gold in Riga, Latvia and finished 6th in Košice, Slovakia. After winning the junior title at the 2014 Canadian Championships, they were assigned to the 2014 World Junior Championships in Sofia, Bulgaria; they placed ninth in the short, 12th in the free, and 12th overall.

During the 2014–15 JGP season, Bent/MacKeen won gold in Ostrava, Czech Republic and silver in Tallinn, Estonia. Their results qualified them for the 2014–15 JGP Final in Barcelona, where they placed fourth. Having already won the junior title, they were required to compete on the senior level at the 2015 Canadian Championships. They finished sixth and were sent again to Tallinn to compete at their third Junior Worlds. They came in fifth after ranking second in the short and eighth in the free. They parted ways at the end of the season.

=== Partnership with Razgulajevs ===
Bent teamed up with Dmitre Razgulajevs in spring 2015. Making their international debut, they won the silver medal at the 2015–16 ISU Junior Grand Prix event in Colorado Springs, Colorado. They finished 5th at their second JGP assignment, in Logroño, Spain. The two missed the Skate Canada Challenge in December because Razgulajevs experienced vertigo but the following month they won the junior gold medal at the 2016 Canadian Championships. Ranked ninth in both segments, they finished ninth at the 2016 World Junior Championships in Debrecen, Hungary.

Having aged out of juniors, Bent/Razgulajevs moved up to the senior level in the 2016–17 season. They placed fourth at the Lake Placid Ice Dance International.

== Programs ==
=== With Razgulajevs ===
Season	Short dance	Free dance
2016-17	Swing: Shoo-Shoo Baby by Phil Moore; Blues: Love You Didn't Do Right By Me by Rosemary Clooney	En Malaga (Verdiales) by Roger Scannura; Muevete by Fermin Spanish Guitar
2015–16	Waltz: Time After Time; Foxtrot: La Grande Valse - Happy Ending choreo. by Juris Razgulajevs, Carol Lane	Ben-Hur by Miklós Rózsa choreo. by Juris Razgulajevs, Carol Lane

=== With MacKeen ===
Season	Short dance	Free dance	Exhibition
2014–15	Rhumba: Vida Loca by Francisco Cespedes; Samba: Straight to Memphis by Club des Belugas choreo. by Carol Lane, Juris Razgulajevs	Once Upon a Time by Mark Isham; Zombie Fight by Ilan Eshkeri choreo. by Asher Hill, Carol Lane, Juris Razgulajevs	I Never Met a Wolf Who Didn't Love to Howl from Smash
2013–14	Quickstep: Let's Start Tomorrow Night; Foxtrot: Movin' the Line; Quickstep: Let's Be Bad by Marc Shaiman	Yesterday Once More; Fun Fun Fun; End of the World performed by Carpenters; Hard Jive performed by Sha Na Na	
2012–13	Blues: History Is Made At Night by Marc Shaiman; Swing: I Never Met A Wolf Who Didn't Love	Misterio Y Fuego performed by Ensemble Vivant	Dance with Me Tonight by Olly Murs

== Competitive highlights ==
CS: Challenger Series; JGP: Junior Grand Prix

=== With Razgulajevs ===
International
Event	2015–16	2016–17
CS Nepela Memorial		12th
CS U.S. Classic		11th
Lake Placid IDI		4th
International: Junior
World Junior Champ.	9th	
JGP Spain	5th	
JGP United States	2nd	
National
Canadian Champ.	1st J	
J: Junior level

=== With MacKeen ===
International
Event	11–12	12–13	13–14	14–15
Junior Worlds		5th	12th	5th
JGP Final				4th
JGP Austria		3rd		
JGP Croatia		4th		
JGP Czech Rep.				1st
JGP Estonia	5th			2nd
JGP Latvia			1st	
JGP Romania	3rd			
JGP Slovakia			6th	
National
Canadian Champ.	4th J	2nd J	1st J	6th
Levels – N: Novice; J: Junior
