= Alexander Petrov (figure skater) =

Russian figure skater

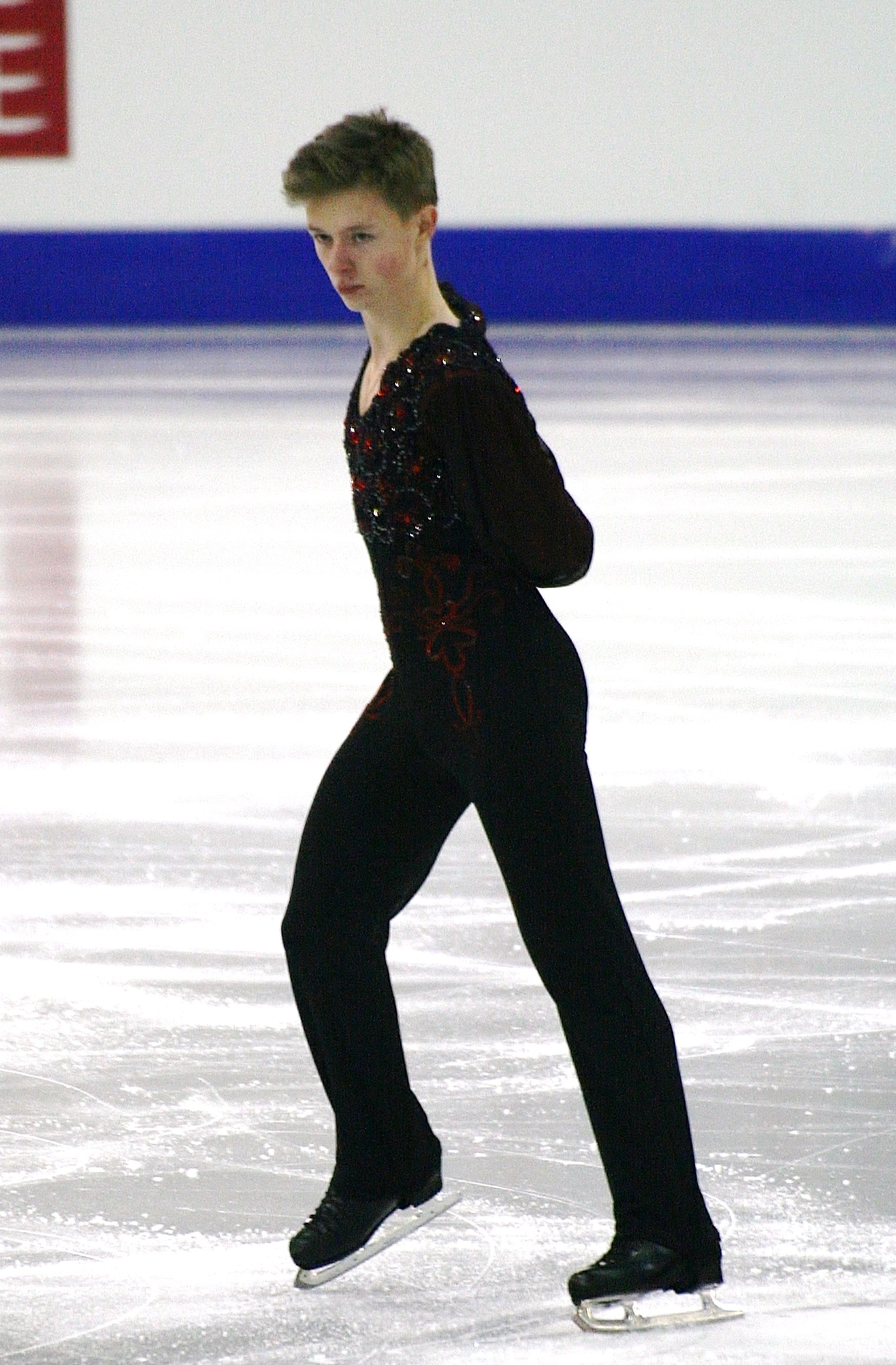
- Petrov in December 2014

Personal information
- Native name: Александр Дмитриевич Петров
- Full name: Alexander Dmitriyevich Petrov
- Born: 26 April 1999 (age 27) Saint Petersburg, Russia
- Home town: Saint Petersburg, Russia
- Height: 1.70 m (5 ft 7 in)

Figure skating career
- Country: Russia
- Coach: Alexei Mishin
- Skating club: Olympic School St. Petersburg
- Began skating: 2004
Medal record
Representing Russia
Figure skating: Men's singles
Russian Championships
Bronze medal – third place	2016 Yekaterinburg	Men's singles
Junior Grand Prix Final
Bronze medal – third place	2014–15 Barcelona	Men's singles

Alexander Dmitriyevich Petrov (Russian: Александр Дмитриевич Петров; born 26 April 1999) is a Russian figure skater. He is the 2016 CS Nebelhorn Trophy champion and the 2016 Russian National bronze medalist. On the junior level, he is the 2014–15 Junior Grand Prix Final bronze medalist and the 2015 Russian Junior National champion. Petrov holds the title of Master of Sports of Russia.

== Personal life ==
Alexander Dmitriyevich Petrov was born 26 April 1999 in Saint Petersburg. He is the eldest child in his family and has one younger sister. Besides skating, Petrov also enjoys listening to music, playing soccer, snowboarding and skateboarding. He supports FC Zenit Saint Petersburg.

== Career ==
=== Early career ===
Petrov began skating at the age of 5 in 2004. His parents first took him skating because he had contracted bronchitis at a very young age. Under doctor's orders they were asked to either take him swimming or to the skating rink. Because he was only 5 years old, Petrov took up figure skating instead of ice hockey. Tatiana Mishina, Oleg Tataurov and Svetlana Frantsuzova were his earliest coaches.

In the 2009–10 season Petrov brought home the silver medal in the novice event at the 2010 Toruń Cup and finished just shy of a medal at Rostelecom Crystal Skate. The following season, Petrov won gold at the 2011 Toruń Cup, his first international gold medal. In the 2011–12 season, he won the novice event at the 2011 NRW Trophy in Dortmund, Germany and finished second in the junior event at Rostelecom Crystal Skate. Making his debut at the 2012 Russian Junior Championships, he finished 12th.

=== 2012–13 season ===
Petrov became age-eligible for the ISU Junior Grand Prix (JGP) series in the 2012–13 season and was assigned two JGP events in his debut season. He finished 5th in his JGP debut in Courchevel, France, and won the silver medal at his second JGP event in Turkey. A triple Axel was included in his programs for his first season on the ISU Junior Grand Prix circuit. This jump was landed and ratified in his second JGP event, albeit with a negative Grade of Execution (GOE). As the 2012–13 season progressed, Petrov went on to land several clean 3A with positive GOE, including one at the 4th stage of the Cup of Russia series in November 2012. Weeks later, at the 5th stage of the Cup of Russia series, Petrov landed a combined total of three clean 3A including a 3A-3T in the free skate. He won that competition with a score of 221.15. On the international scene, Petrov won gold medals in the junior events at the 2012 Coupe de Nice and the 2013 20th Volvo Open Cup. At the Russian Championships, he was tenth in his senior-level debut and won the bronze medal in the junior event. In his final competition of the season, Petrov won the junior gold medal at the 2013 Triglav Trophy with an overall score of 192.97 points, which included a 3A (1.00 GOE) in the short and 3A (2.00 GOE) and 3A-2T (1.00 GOE) in the free skate.

=== 2013–14 season ===
In the 2013–14 season, Alexei Mishin began coaching Petrov alongside Tatiana Mishina and Oleg Tataurov. Petrov won silver in his season's debut at the Junior Grand Prix event in Gdańsk, Poland and another silver medal in Ostrava, Czech Republic. He qualified for his first JGP Final. In November, Petrov competed in the first senior international of his career at the 2013 22nd Volvo Open Cup in Riga, Latvia and won the silver medal there. He beat several experienced skaters including compatriots Sergey Borodulin and Zhan Bush, finishing behind 4-time Olympic medalist Evgeni Plushenko. In Riga he landed a total of three clean 3As, including a 3A-2T in the long program. Petrov then finished 5th at the Junior Grand Prix Final held in Fukuoka, Japan. At the Russian Championships, Petrov ranked eighth on the senior level and improved on his previous showing by winning silver in the junior event, finishing 1.88 points behind Adian Pitkeev. He placed 4th at the 2014 World Junior Championships.

=== 2014–15 season ===
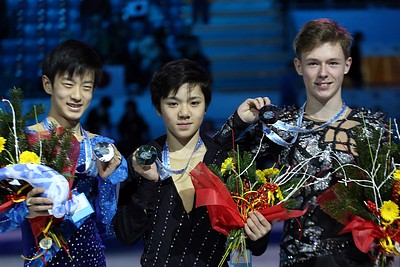
Petrov at the 2014-15 Junior Grand Prix Final podium

In his season's debut at the Junior Grand Prix series, Petrov took the silver medal in Ljubljana, Slovenia, where he led China's Jin Boyang after the short program and finished 3.84 points behind Jin overall after the latter landed three quadruple jumps in the free skate. He went on to win gold in Tallinn, Estonia, outscoring Japan's Sota Yamamoto by 5.67 points, and qualified for his second consecutive Junior Grand Prix Final, where he would eventually take home the bronze medal after finishing second in the free skate. Competing on the senior level at the 2014 Finlandia Trophy, he placed second in the short and third in the free skate, taking the bronze medal behind American Adam Rippon. Petrov won his first international senior title at the 2014 Cup of Nice after placing first in both programs and outscoring fellow medalists Artur Dmitriev, Jr. and Keiji Tanaka by over thirty points. He then followed that win with a gold medal at the 2014 Volvo Open Cup. On November 22, Petrov placed first at the 2014 Warsaw Cup posting personal best scores with a total of 231.53 points.

In early 2015, Petrov fell ill several times with an acute respiratory infection. Illness took its toll on his performance at the World Junior Championships where he finished 6th overall after winning a bronze medal for the short program. Petrov ended the season in the top 20 in the ISU World Standings with a Seasonal Best score in the top 20 as well. In the ISU Seasonal World Standings, he was ranked 12th at the end of the 2014–2015 season and finished second in the Challenger Series rankings.

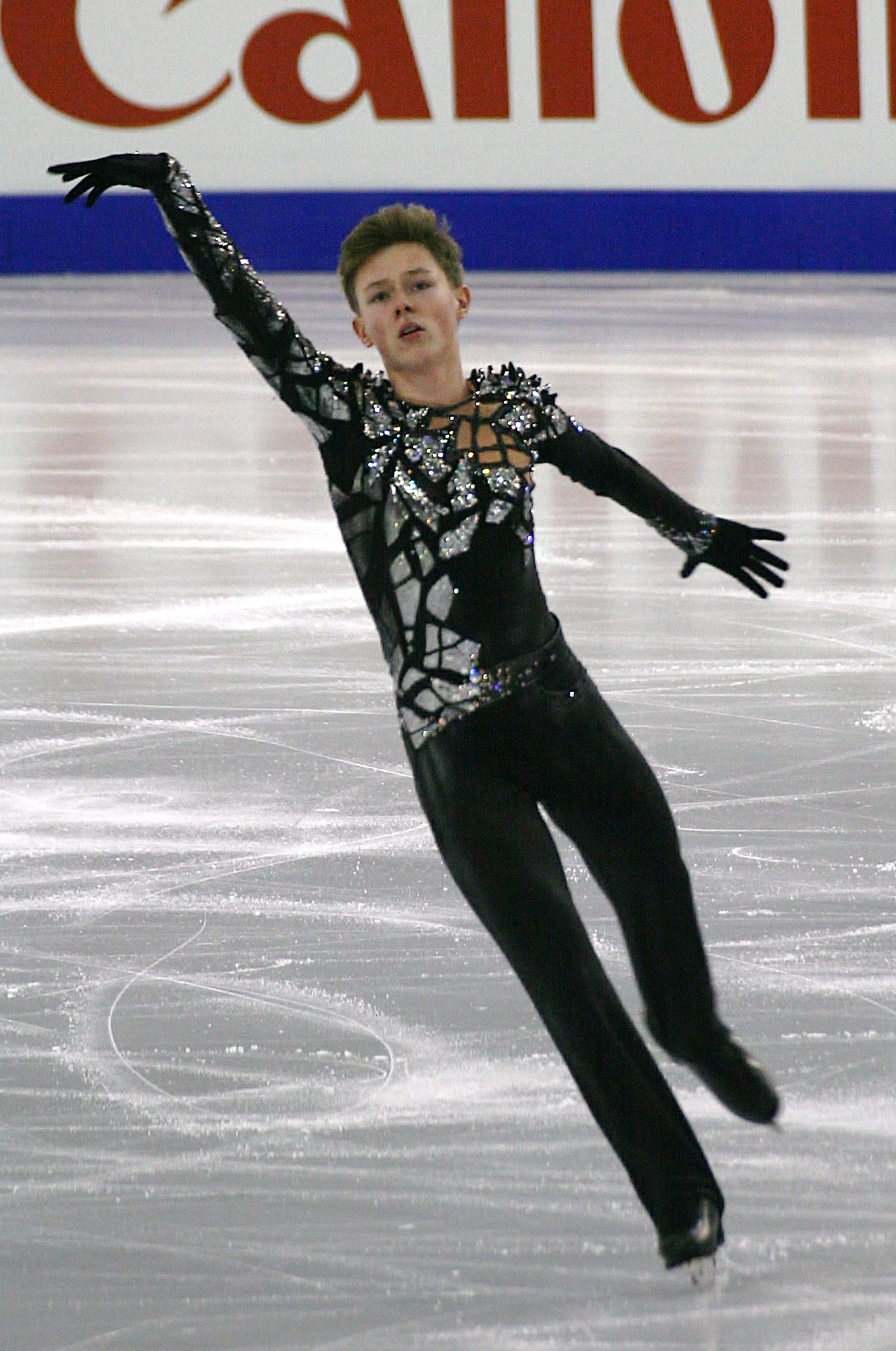

=== 2015–16 season: Full senior debut ===
In 2015, Petrov moved up to the senior Grand Prix circuit and received two GP assignments. He made his senior Grand Prix debut at 2015 Skate Canada International. He finished 6th overall and was subsequently invited to the gala event where he did an exhibition number to the song All Star. At his second Grand Prix event, 2015 Trophée Éric Bompard, Petrov completed another clean skate and placed 6th going into the free skate. Due to the November 2015 Paris attacks, the free skating event was cancelled. Eventually, the ISU decided to award points from the competition based on the placing of the skaters after the short program.

At the 2016 Russian Championships in Ekaterinburg in December, Petrov once again skated a clean program and placed 5th after the short program. He completed a flawless free skate to move up two placings and win the bronze medal, his first senior Russian Championships medal at the young age of 16 years. Petrov's TES in the free skate was the highest in the entire competition. His triple Axel combination received 2.00 GOE and his solo triple Axel received 1.71 GOE. It was revealed after the event that he had in fact been carrying a ligament injury to his leg going into the competition, after falling badly just one and a half weeks before the Championships.

After finishing on the podium at the 2016 Russian Championships, Petrov earned the right to represent Russia at the 2016 European Championships in Bratislava. Due to an illness contracted after returning from a training camp in Estonia a fortnight before the European Championships, he had not been able to train until three days before he flew to Bratislava. Even so, he fought hard and skated both programs cleanly, being the only Russian man to do so and eventually finishing eighth overall on his debut. He also set a new personal best in the short program and a season's best in the free skate.

=== 2016–17 season ===
In 2016, Petrov started his season at the 2016 Nebelhorn Trophy where he won gold after placing first in both the short and free skate with a total of 232.21 points. For the 2016-17 Grand Prix season, Petrov has been assigned the 2016 Skate Canada International and the 2016 Cup of China.

=== 2017–18 season ===
Petrov began the season at 2017 CS Lombardia Trophy, finishing seventh, and then competed at a second Challenger event, the 2017 CS Finlandia Trophy, where he came ninth. He was assigned to the 2017 Cup of China and the 2017 Skate America, coming eleventh at the Cup of China before withdrawing from Skate America. He then competed at a third Challenger, the 2017 CS Golden Spin of Zagreb, coming eighth. He withdrew from the 2018 Russian Championships.

=== 2018–19 season ===
Petrov placed seventh at the 2019 Russian Championships.

=== 2020-21 season ===
In October, it was announced that he had changed coaches to work with Evgeni Plushenko.

== Programs ==
Season	Short program	Free skating	Exhibition
2017–2018	Sabre Dance by Aram Khachaturian	My Kind of Town; Chicago; I'm Gonna Live Till I Die by Frank Sinatra choreo. by Misha Ge and Benoît Richaud	
2016–2017	Ritual Fire Dance by Manuel de Falla	My Kind of Town; Chicago; I'm Gonna Live Till I Die by Frank Sinatra choreo. by Misha Ge and Benoît Richaud	El Conquistador by Maxime Rodriguez choreo. by Edvald Smirnov; Can't Stop the Feeling! by Justin Timberlake choreo. by Alexander Petrov
2015–2016	La Leyenda del Beso by Raúl Di Blasio choreo. by Stephane Lambiel	Oblivion by Astor Piazzolla choreo. by Benoît Richaud	All Star by Smash Mouth choreo. by Alexander Petrov; El Conquistador by Maxime Rodriguez choreo. by Edvald Smirnov; Just A Gigolo by Lou Bega choreo. by Alexander Petrov
2014–2015	El Conquistador by Maxime Rodriguez choreo. by Edvald Smirnov	Selection of music (modern arrangement) by Antonio Vivaldi choreo. by Edvald Smirnov	
2013–2014	The Godfather by Nino Rota choreo. by Edvald Smirnov	Once Upon a Time in America by Ennio Morricone choreo. by Edvald Smirnov	Mr Pinstripe Suit by Big Bad Voodoo Daddy choreo. by Alexander Petrov; Mirrors by Justin Timberlake choreo. by Alexander Petrov
2012–2013	Fugue by Johann Sebastian Bach	Once Upon a Time in America by Ennio Morricone choreo. by Edvald Smirnov	Blood Diamond by James Newton Howard
2011–2012	Summer by David Garrett	Blood Diamond by James Newton Howard	
2010–2011	Summer by David Garrett	Kalinka; Cossack Patrol	
2009–2010	Bumble Boogie	Kalinka; Cossack Patrol	
2008		Axel F (from Beverly Hills Cop) by Harold Faltermeyer	

== Competitive highlights ==
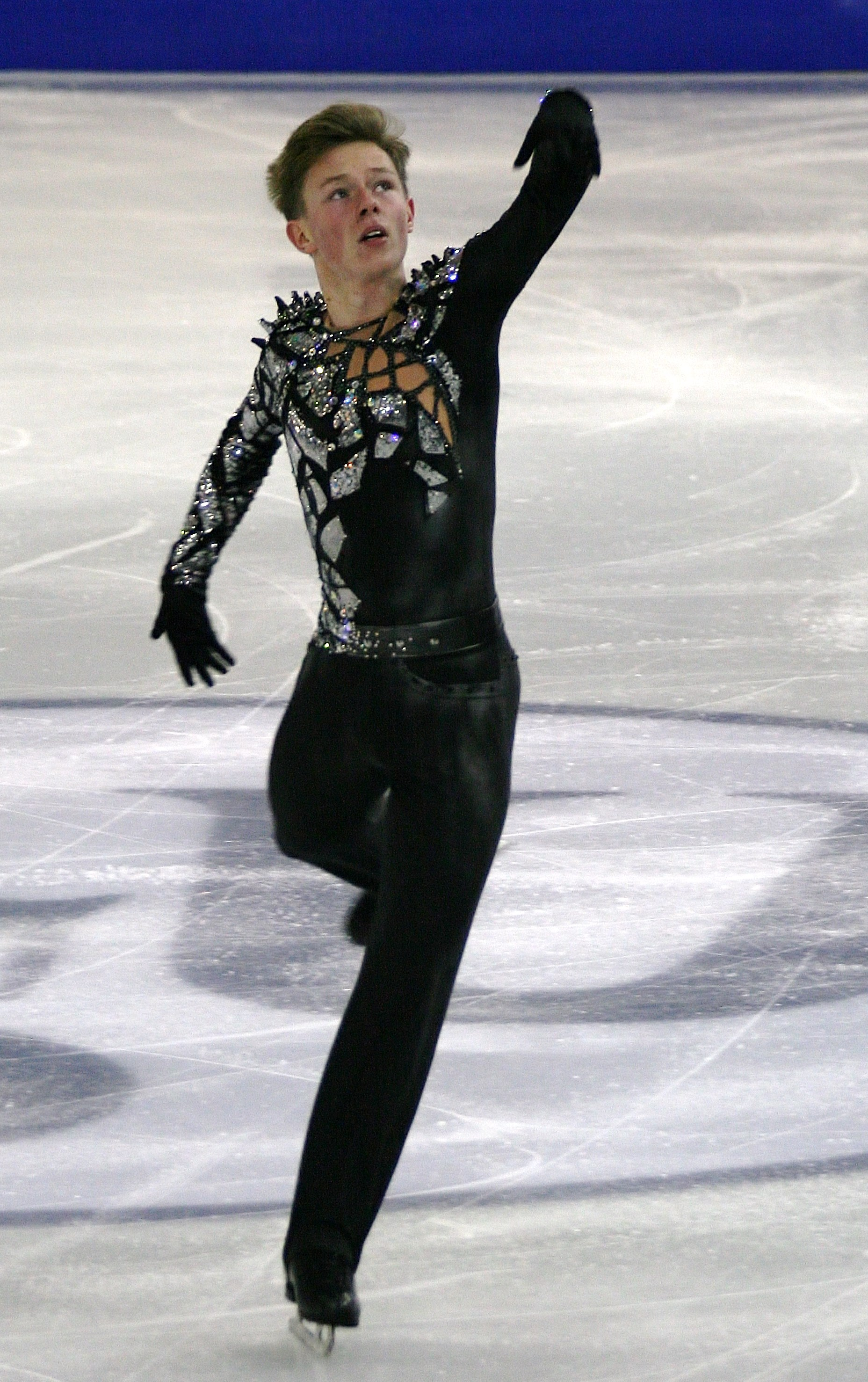
Petrov at the 2014–15 Grand Prix of Figure Skating Final

GP: Grand Prix; CS: Challenger Series; JGP: Junior Grand Prix

International
Event	11–12	12–13	13–14	14–15	15–16	16–17	17–18	18–19	19–20
Europeans					8th				
GP Cup of China						6th	11th		
GP Bompard					6th				
GP Skate America							WD		
GP Skate Canada					6th	7th			
CS Finlandia				3rd		6th	9th		
CS Golden Spin						4th	8th		
CS Lombardia							7th		
CS Nebelhorn						1st			
CS Warsaw Cup				1st					
CS Volvo Cup				1st					
Cup of Nice				1st	6th				
Dragon Trophy								1st	
Sarajevo Open					2nd				
Sportland Trophy					2nd				
Triglav Trophy						1st			
Volvo Open Cup			2nd						
International: Junior, Novice
Junior Worlds			4th	6th		4th			
JGP Final			5th	3rd					
JGP Czech Rep.			2nd						
JGP Estonia				1st					
JGP France		5th							
JGP Poland			2nd						
JGP Slovenia				2nd					
JGP Turkey		2nd							
Cup of Nice		1st J							
Sofia Trophy						1st J			
Triglav Trophy		1st J							
Volvo Open Cup		1st J							
RTC Crystal Skate	2nd J								
National
Russian Champ.		10th	8th	9th	3rd	6th	WD	7th	
Russian Junior	12th	3rd	2nd	1st		2nd			
Russian Cup Final						2nd		2nd	6th

== Detailed results ==
Small medals for short program and free skating awarded only at ISU Championships.

=== Senior level ===
2018–19 season
Date	Event	SP	FS	Total
18–22 February 2019	2019 Russian Cup Final domestic competition	3; 79.80	3; 155.05	2; 234.85
7–10 February 2019	2019 Dragon Trophy	2; 79.69	1; 136.94	1; 216.63
19–23 December 2018	2019 Russian Championships	13; 61.64	5; 158.30	7; 219.94
2017–18 season
Date	Event	SP	FS	Total
19–24 December 2017	2018 Russian Championships	15; 65.08	WD	WD
6–9 December 2017	2017 CS Golden Spin of Zagreb	8; 74.44	7; 146.15	8; 220.59
3–5 November 2017	2017 Cup of China	9; 68.58	12; 117.44	11; 186.02
6–8 October 2017	2017 CS Finlandia Trophy	11; 59.42	8; 139.15	9; 198.57
14–17 September 2017	2017 CS Lombardia Trophy	8; 68.79	6; 139.86	7; 208.65
2016–17 season
Date	Event	SP	FS	Total
5–9 April 2017	2017 Triglav Trophy	2; 75.62	1; 141.94	1; 217.56
22–25 December 2016	2017 Russian Championships	9; 75.97	5; 160.96	6; 236.93
7–10 December 2016	2016 CS Golden Spin of Zagreb	11; 66.63	1; 156.29	4; 222.92
18–20 November 2016	2016 Cup of China	9; 74.21	6; 154.23	6; 228.44
28–30 October 2016	2016 Skate Canada	8; 71.50	6; 152.89	7; 224.39
6–10 October 2016	2016 CS Finlandia Trophy	7; 69.71	3; 142.09	6; 211.80
22–24 September 2016	2016 CS Nebelhorn Trophy	1; 75.13	1; 157.08	1; 232.21
2015–16 season
Date	Event	SP	FS	Total
2–6 March 2016	2016 Sportland Trophy	2; 67.83	2; 143.01	2; 210.84
4–7 February 2016	2016 Sarajevo Open	2; 69.67	2; 140.47	2; 210.14
26–31 January 2016	2016 European Championships	10; 76.95	7; 152.74	8; 229.69
24–27 December 2015	2016 Russian Championships	5; 81.61	3; 167.03	3; 248.64
13–15 November 2015	2015 Trophée Éric Bompard	6; 74.64	C	6
30 October – 1 November 2015	2015 Skate Canada International	7; 71.44	7; 149.58	6; 221.02
16–18 October 2015	2015 International Cup of Nice	3; 75.90	6; 133.19	6; 208.99

- C= Cancelled.

=== Junior level ===
2016–17 season
Date	Event	Level	SP	FS	Total
15–19 March 2017	2017 World Junior Championships	Junior	4; 81.29	5; 162.18	4; 243.47
8–12 February 2017	2017 Sofia Trophy	Junior	1; 77.52	1; 134.08	1; 211.60
1–5 February 2017	2017 Russian Junior Championships	Junior	3; 79.19	2; 161.07	2; 240.26
2014–15 season
Date	Event	Level	SP	FS	Total
2–8 March 2015	2015 World Junior Championships	Junior	3; 75.28	10; 130.95	6; 206.23
4–7 February 2015	2015 Russian Junior Championships	Junior	1; 77.89	2; 140.18	1; 218.07
24–28 December 2014	2015 Russian Championships	Senior	6; 76.87	10; 129.00	9; 205.87
11–14 December 2014	2014–15 Junior Grand Prix Final	Junior	4; 70.07	2; 137.07	3; 207.14
20–23 November 2014	2014 CS Warsaw Cup	Senior	1; 75.74	1; 155.79	1; 231.53
5–9 November 2014	2014 CS Volvo Open Cup	Senior	1; 74.49	1; 144.29	1; 218.78
15–19 October 2014	2014 International Cup of Nice	Senior	1; 74.91	1; 156.79	1; 231.70
9–12 October 2014	2014 CS Finlandia Trophy	Senior	2; 73.29	3; 141.21	3; 214.50
24–27 September 2014	2014 JGP Tallinn Cup	Junior	1; 70.74	1; 137.63	1; 208.37
27–30 August 2014	2014 JGP Ljubljana Cup	Junior	1; 74.59	2; 141.74	2; 216.33
2013–14 season
Date	Event	Level	SP	FS	Total
10–16 March 2014	2014 World Junior Championships	Junior	5; 69.72	4; 140.31	4; 210.03
22–25 January 2014	2014 Russian Junior Championships	Junior	2; 79.14	2; 148.57	2; 227.71
22–27 December 2013	2014 Russian Championships	Senior	7; 71.79	7; 144.68	8; 216.47
5–8 December 2013	2013–14 Junior Grand Prix Final	Junior	4; 70.92	5; 127.71	5; 198.63
7–10 November 2013	2013 Volvo Open Cup (22nd)	Senior	2; 73.77	2; 144.98	2; 218.75
2–5 October 2013	2013 JGP Czech Skate	Junior	2; 70.08	2; 133.36	2; 203.44
18–21 September 2013	2013 JGP Baltic Cup	Junior	2; 63.70	2; 131.70	2; 195.40
2012–13 season
Date	Event	Level	SP	FS	Total
27–31 March 2013	2013 Triglav Trophy	Junior	1; 66.56	1; 126.41	1; 192.97
31 January – 3 February 2013	2013 Russian Junior Championships	Junior	3; 66.55	3; 145.37	3; 211.92
10–13 January 2013	2013 20th Volvo Open Cup	Junior	1; 60.40	1; 108.91	1; 169.31
24–28 December 2012	2013 Russian Championships	Junior	8; 67.83	8; 135.74	10; 203.57
24–28 October 2012	2012 International Cup of Nice	Junior	1; 58.23	1; 130.72	1; 188.95
19–22 September 2012	2012 JGP Istanbul Bosphorus Cup	Junior	2; 60.28	2; 114.17	2; 174.45
22–25 August 2012	2012 JGP Courchevel	Junior	6; 51.74	6; 107.94	5; 159.68
2011–12 season
Date	Event	Level	SP	FS	Total
26–28 April 2012	2012 Rostelecom Crystal Skate	Junior	3; 47.00	1; 116.97	2; 163.97
4–7 February 2012	2012 Russian Junior Championships	Junior	13; 54.12	11; 106.37	12; 160.49
29 November – 4 December 2011	2011 NRW Trophy	Junior	1; 48.44	1; 87.76	1; 136.20
2010–11 season
Date	Event	Level	SP	FS	Total
6–8 January 2011	2011 Toruń Cup	Novice	1; 34.19	1; 67.18	1; 101.37
2009–10 season
Date	Event	Level	SP	FS	Total
24–25 April 2010	2010 Rostelecom Crystal Skate	Novice	4; 32.86	4; 85.73	4; 118.59
7–10 January 2010	2010 Toruń Cup	Novice	2; 33.77	1; 69.64	2; 103.41
