= 2014–15 ISU Junior Grand Prix =

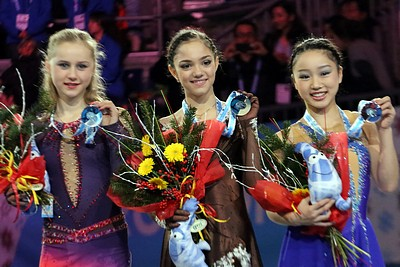
- 2014-2015 JGPF Ladies Podium
- Type: ISU Junior Grand Prix
- Date: August 20 – December 14, 2014
- Season: 2014–15
- Previous: 2013–14 ISU Junior Grand Prix
- Next: 2015–16 ISU Junior Grand Prix

The 2014–15 ISU Junior Grand Prix was the 18th season of a series of junior international competitions organized by the International Skating Union. It was the junior-level complement to the 2014–15 ISU Grand Prix of Figure Skating. Medals were awarded in the disciplines of men's singles, ladies' singles, pair skating, and ice dance. At each event, skaters also earned points toward qualifying for the final. The top six skaters or teams from each discipline met at the 2014–15 Junior Grand Prix Final, held together with the senior final.

== Competitions ==
The locations of the JGP events change yearly. In the 2014–15 season, the series was composed of the following events in autumn 2014:

Date	Event	Location	Details	Other notes
August 20–24	2014 JGP Courchevel	Courchevel, France	Results	No pairs
August 27–31	2014 JGP Slovenia	Ljubljana, Slovenia	Results	No pairs
September 3–7	2014 JGP Ostrava	Ostrava, Czech Republic	Results	
September 10–14	2014 JGP SBC Cup	Aichi, Japan	Results	No pairs
September 24–28	2014 JGP Tallinn Cup	Tallinn, Estonia	Results	
October 1–5	2014 JGP Pokal der Blauen Schwerter	Dresden, Germany	Results	
October 8–12	2014 JGP Croatia Cup	Zagreb, Croatia	Results	
December 11–14	2014–15 Junior Grand Prix Final	Barcelona, Spain		Held with senior GPF

== Qualifying ==
Skaters who had reached the age of 13 before July 1, 2014 but had not turned 19 (singles and females of the other two disciplines) or 21 (male pair skaters and ice dancers) were eligible to compete on the junior circuit. Unlike the senior Grand Prix, skaters for the JGP are not seeded by the ISU. The number of entries allotted to each ISU member federation was determined by their skaters' placements in each discipline at the previous season's Junior World Championships.

== Medalists ==
=== Men ===
Competition	Gold	Silver	Bronze	Details
JGP Courchevel	(South Korea) Lee June-hyoung	(Japan) Sota Yamamoto	(Russia) Alexander Samarin	Details
JGP Ljubljana Cup	(China) Jin Boyang	(Russia) Alexander Petrov	(Russia) Dmitri Aliev	Details
JGP Ostrava	(Canada) Roman Sadovsky	(Russia) Alexander Samarin	(Japan) Sei Kawahara	Details
JGP Nagoya TV Cup	(China) Jin Boyang	(Japan) Shoma Uno	(Russia) Dmitri Aliev	Details
JGP Tallinn Cup	(Russia) Alexander Petrov	(Japan) Sota Yamamoto	(China) Zhang He	Details
JGP Pokal dBS	(Russia) Andrei Lazukin	(China) Zhang He	(Ukraine) Yaroslav Paniot	Details
JGP Croatia Cup	(Japan) Shoma Uno	(United States) Nathan Chen	(South Korea) Lee June-hyoung	Details
JGP Final	(Japan) Shoma Uno	(Japan) Sota Yamamoto	(Russia) Alexander Petrov	Details

=== Ladies ===
Competition	Gold	Silver	Bronze	Details
JGP Courchevel	(Russia) Evgenia Medvedeva	(Japan) Rin Nitaya	(United States) Amber Glenn	Details
JGP Ljubljana Cup	(Russia) Serafima Sakhanovich	(Japan) Yuka Nagai	(United States) Leah Keiser	Details
JGP Ostrava	(Russia) Evgenia Medvedeva	(Japan) Wakaba Higuchi	(United States) Karen Chen	Details
JGP Nagoya TV Cup	(Russia) Serafima Sakhanovich	(Japan) Yuka Nagai	(Kazakhstan) Elizabet Tursynbayeva	Details
JGP Tallinn Cup	(Japan) Miyu Nakashio	(Russia) Maria Sotskova	(Russia) Alsu Kaiumova	Details
JGP Pokal dBS	(Japan) Wakaba Higuchi	(Kazakhstan) Elizabet Tursynbayeva	(Russia) Alexandra Proklova	Details
JGP Croatia Cup	(Russia) Maria Sotskova	(United States) Karen Chen	(Russia) Alexandra Proklova	Details
JGP Final	(Russia) Evgenia Medvedeva	(Russia) Serafima Sakhanovich	(Japan) Wakaba Higuchi	Details

=== Pairs ===
Competition	Gold	Silver	Bronze	Details
JGP Ostrava	(Canada) Julianne Séguin / Charlie Bilodeau	(Russia) Lina Fedorova / Maxim Miroshkin	(Russia) Kamilla Gainetdinova / Sergei Alexeev	Details
JGP Tallinn Cup	(Russia) Maria Vigalova / Egor Zakroev	(Russia) Kamilla Gainetdinova / Sergei Alexeev	(Russia) Anastasia A. Gubanova / Alexei Sintsov	Details
JGP Pokal dBS	(Canada) Julianne Séguin / Charlie Bilodeau	(Russia) Lina Fedorova / Maxim Miroshkin	(United States) Chelsea Liu / Brian Johnson	Details
JGP Croatia Cup	(Russia) Maria Vigalova / Egor Zakroev	(Russia) Daria Beklemisheva / Maxim Bobrov	(Ukraine) Renata Ohanesian / Mark Bardei	Details
JGP Final	(Canada) Julianne Séguin / Charlie Bilodeau	(Russia) Lina Fedorova / Maxim Miroshkin	(Russia) Maria Vigalova / Egor Zakroev	Details

=== Ice dance ===
Competition	Gold	Silver	Bronze	Details
JGP Courchevel	(Russia) Alla Loboda / Pavel Drozd	(Canada) Madeline Edwards / Zhao Kai Pang	(Russia) Anastasia Shpilevaya / Grigory Smirnov	Details
JGP Ljubljana Cup	(Russia) Daria Morozova / Mikhail Zhirnov	(Canada) Brianna Delmaestro / Timothy Lum	(United States) Holly Moore / Daniel Klaber	Details
JGP Ostrava	(Canada) Mackenzie Bent / Garrett MacKeen	(Russia) Betina Popova / Yuri Vlasenko	(United States) Lorraine McNamara / Quinn Carpenter	Details
JGP Nagoya TV Cup	(Canada) Madeline Edwards / Zhao Kai Pang	(Russia) Alla Loboda / Pavel Drozd	(United States) Rachel Parsons / Michael Parsons	Details
JGP Tallinn Cup	(Russia) Anna Yanovskaya / Sergey Mozgov	(Canada) Mackenzie Bent / Garrett MacKeen	(Ukraine) Oleksandra Nazarova / Maxim Nikitin	Details
JGP Pokal dBS	(Russia) Betina Popova / Yuri Vlasenko	(United States) Lorraine McNamara / Quinn Carpenter	(Canada) Brianna Delmaestro / Timothy Lum	Details
JGP Croatia Cup	(Russia) Anna Yanovskaya / Sergey Mozgov	(United States) Rachel Parsons / Michael Parsons	(Hungary) Carolina Moscheni / Ádám Lukács	Details
JGP Final	(Russia) Anna Yanovskaya / Sergey Mozgov	(Russia) Alla Loboda / Pavel Drozd	(Russia) Betina Popova / Yuri Vlasenko	Details

== Medals table ==
Rank	Nation	Gold	Silver	Bronze	Total
1	Russia (RUS)	16	12	12	40
2	Canada (CAN)	6	3	1	10
3	Japan (JPN)	4	8	2	14
4	China (CHN)	2	1	1	4
5	South Korea (KOR)	1	0	1	2
6	United States (USA)	0	4	7	11
7	Kazakhstan (KAZ)	0	1	1	2
8	Ukraine (UKR)	0	0	3	3
9	Hungary (HUN)	0	0	1	1
Totals (9 entries)		29	29	29	87

== JGP Final qualification standings ==
=== Qualification rules ===
At each event, skaters earn points toward qualification for the Junior Grand Prix Final. Following the 7th event, the top six highest scoring skaters advance to the Final. The points earned per placement are as follows:

Placement	Points (Singles/Dance)	Points (Pairs)
1st	15	15
2nd	13	13
3rd	11	11
4th	9	9
5th	7	7
6th	5	5
7th	4	4
8th	3	3
9th	2	–
10th	1	–

There are seven tie-breakers in cases of a tie in overall points:

1. Highest placement at an event. If a skater placed 1st and 3rd, the tiebreaker is the 1st place, and that beats a skater who placed 2nd in both events.
2. Highest combined total scores in both events. If a skater earned 200 points at one event and 250 at a second, that skater would win in the second tie-break over a skater who earned 200 points at one event and 150 at another.
3. Participated in two events.
4. Highest combined scores in the free skating/free dance portion of both events.
5. Highest individual score in the free skating/free dance portion from one event.
6. Highest combined scores in the short program/short dance of both events.
7. Highest number of total participants at the events.

If there is still a tie, it is considered unbreakable and the tied skaters all advance to the Junior Grand Prix Final.

=== Qualifiers ===
	Men	Ladies	Pairs	Ice dance
1	(China) Jin Boyang	(Russia) Serafima Sakhanovich	(Canada) Julianne Séguin / Charlie Bilodeau	(Russia) Anna Yanovskaya / Sergey Mozgov
2	(Japan) Shoma Uno	(Russia) Evgenia Medvedeva	(Russia) Maria Vigalova / Egor Zakroev	(Canada) Mackenzie Bent / Garrett MacKeen
3	(Russia) Alexander Petrov	(Japan) Wakaba Higuchi	(Russia) Lina Fedorova / Maxim Miroshkin	(Russia) Betina Popova / Yuri Vlasenko
4	(South Korea) Lee June-hyoung	(Russia) Maria Sotskova	(Russia) Kamilla Gainetdinova / Sergei Alexeev	(Russia) Alla Loboda / Pavel Drozd
5	(Japan) Sota Yamamoto	(Japan) Yuka Nagai	(Russia) Daria Beklemisheva / Maxim Bobrov	(Canada) Madeline Edwards / Zhao Kai Pang
6	(Canada) Roman Sadovsky	(Japan) Miyu Nakashio	(United States) Chelsea Liu / Brian Johnson	(Russia) Daria Morozova / Mikhail Zhirnov
Alternates
1st	(China) Zhang He	(United States) Karen Chen	(Russia) Anastasia A. Gubanova / Alexei Sintsov	(United States) Rachel Parsons / Michael Parsons
2nd	(Russia) Alexander Samarin	(Kazakhstan) Elizabet Tursynbayeva	(Ukraine) Renata Ohanesian / Mark Bardei	(United States) Lorraine McNamara / Quinn Carpenter
3rd	(Russia) Dmitri Aliev	(Japan) Rin Nitaya	(Japan) Ami Koga / Francis Boudreau Audet	(Canada) Brianna Delmaestro / Timothy Lum

== Top JGP scores ==
=== Men ===
Rank	Name	Nation	Score	Event
1	Shoma Uno	Japan	238.27	2014–15 Junior Grand Prix Final
2	Jin Boyang	China	221.92	2014 JGP Japan
3	Alexander Petrov	Russia	216.33	2014 JGP Slovenia
4	Sota Yamamoto	Japan	213.12	2014–15 Junior Grand Prix Final
5	Nathan Chen	United States	208.16	2014 JGP Croatia
6	Lee June-hyoung	South Korea	203.92	2014 JGP Croatia
7	Andrei Lazukin	Russia	202.68	2014 JGP Germany
8	Zhang He	China	196.20	2014 JGP Germany
9	Yaroslav Paniot	Ukraine	194.60	2014 JGP Germany
10	Roman Sadovsky	Canada	192.44	2014 JGP Germany

=== Ladies ===
Rank	Name	Nation	Score	Event
1	Serafima Sakhanovich	Russia	191.96	2014 JGP Slovenia
2	Evgenia Medvedeva	Russia	190.89	2014–15 Junior Grand Prix Final
3	Wakaba Higuchi	Japan	178.09	2014–15 Junior Grand Prix Final
4	Maria Sotskova	Russia	175.99	2014–15 Junior Grand Prix Final
5	Yuka Nagai	Japan	172.34	2014–15 Junior Grand Prix Final
6	Karen Chen	United States	169.41	2014 JGP Croatia
7	Elizabet Tursynbayeva	Kazakhstan	164.79	2014 JGP Germany
8	Miyu Nakashio	Japan	160.64	2014 JGP Estonia
9	Alexandra Proklova	Russia	159.23	2014 JGP Croatia
10	Rin Nitaya	Japan	158.76	2014 JGP France

=== Pairs ===
Rank	Name	Nation	Score	Event
1	Julianne Séguin / Charlie Bilodeau	Canada	175.57	2014–15 Junior Grand Prix Final
2	Maria Vigalova / Egor Zakroev	Russia	167.98	2014 JGP Croatia
3	Lina Fedorova / Maxim Miroshkin	Russia	165.78	2014–15 Junior Grand Prix Final
4	Daria Beklemisheva / Maxim Bobrov	Russia	143.62	2014 JGP Croatia
5	Kamilla Gainetdinova / Sergei Alexeev	Russia	137.31	2014 JGP Estonia
6	Renata Ohanesian / Mark Bardei	Ukraine	135.57	2014 JGP Croatia
7	Chelsea Liu / Brian Johnson	United States	134.97	2014 JGP Croatia
8	Maria Chuzhanova / Denis Mintsev	Russia	134.80	2014 JGP Croatia
9	Ami Koga / Francis Boudreau Audet	Japan	134.07	2014 JGP Croatia
10	Anastasia A. Gubanova / Alexei Sintsov	Russia	132.45	2014 JGP Estonia

=== Ice dance ===
Rank	Name	Nation	Score	Event
1	Anna Yanovskaya / Sergey Mozgov	Russia	152.00	2014 JGP Estonia
2	Betina Popova / Yuri Vlasenko	Russia	147.31	2014 JGP Germany
3	Mackenzie Bent / Garrett MacKeen	Canada	144.51	2014 JGP Estonia
4	Rachel Parsons / Michael Parsons	United States	140.33	2014 JGP Croatia
5	Lorraine McNamara / Quinn Carpenter	United States	139.35	2014 JGP Germany
6	Alla Loboda / Pavel Drozd	Russia	136.31	2014–15 Junior Grand Prix Final
7	Carolina Moscheni / Ádám Lukács	Hungary	135.96	2014 JGP Croatia
8	Madeline Edwards / Zhao Kai Pang	Canada	134.42	2014 JGP Japan
9	Daria Morozova / Mikhail Zhirnov	Russia	131.54	2014 JGP Slovenia
10	Brianna Delmaestro / Timothy Lum	Canada	131.30	2014 JGP Slovenia
