= Garrett MacKeen =

Canadian ice dancer (born 1994)

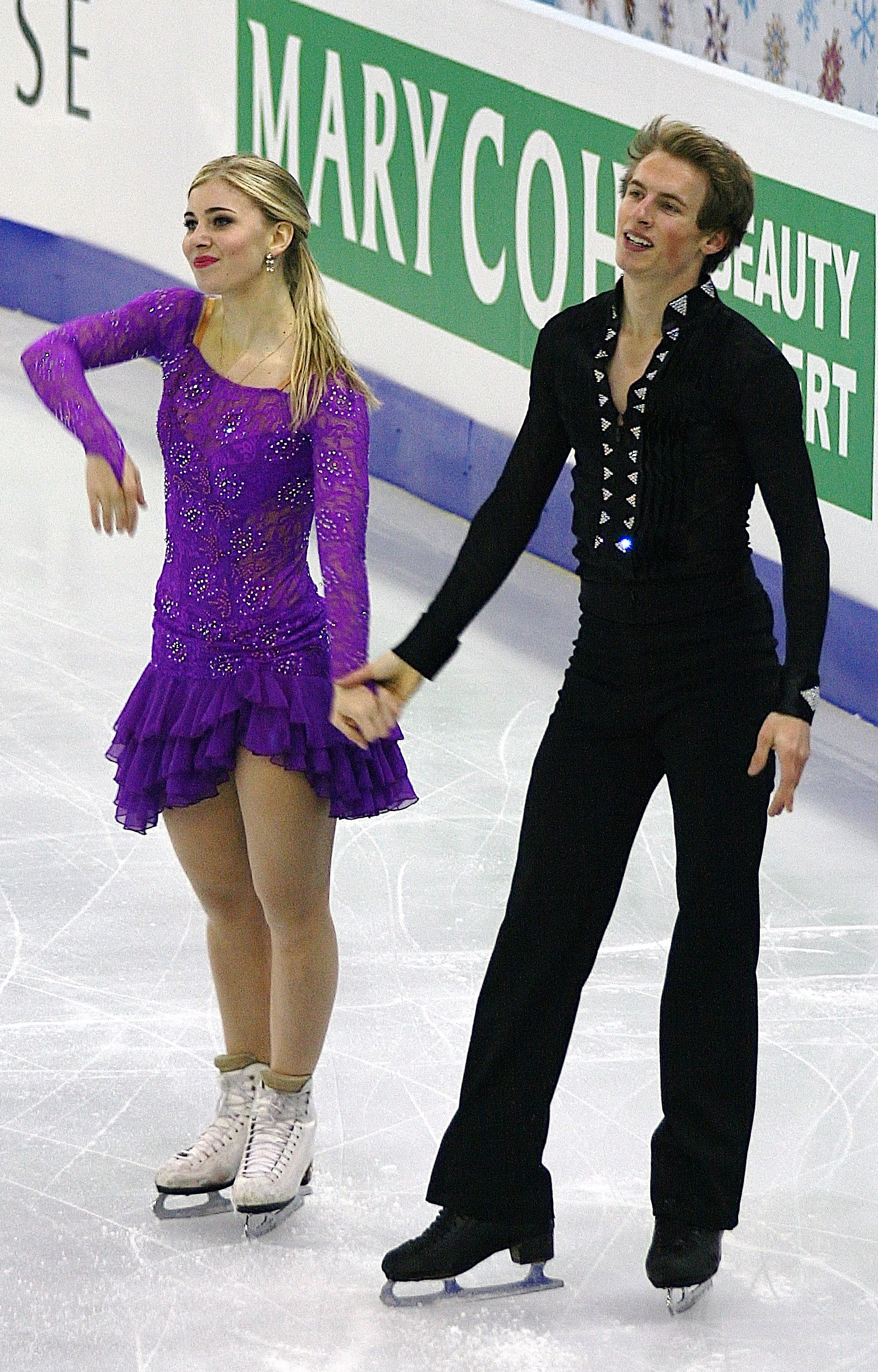

Personal information
- Born: March 23, 1994 (age 32) Burnaby, British Columbia
- Home town: Oshawa, Ontario
- Height: 1.78 m (5 ft 10 in)

Figure skating career
- Country: Canada
- Coach: Carol and Jon Lane; Juris Razgulajevs
- Skating club: Scarboro FSC; Bowmanville FSC
- Began skating: 1997

Garrett MacKeen (born March 23, 1994) is a Canadian ice dancer. With former partner Mackenzie Bent, he is the 2014 Canadian junior champion and finished 5th at two World Junior Championships.

== Career ==
Bent/MacKeen won the novice bronze medal at the Canadian Championships in January 2011. Making their ISU Junior Grand Prix (JGP) debut, they took the bronze medal in Braşov, Romania in September of the same year. They placed 5th at their second JGP assignment, in Tallinn, Estonia, and fourth on the junior level at the 2012 Canadian Championships.

Bent/MacKeen returned to the JGP series in 2012–13, winning a bronze medal in Linz, Austria and placing fourth in Zagreb, Croatia. Junior silver medalists at the 2013 Canadian Championships, they were named in Canada's team to the 2013 World Junior Championships in Milan, Italy. Ranked 4th in the short dance and 7th in the free dance, they finished 5th overall in their debut at the competition.

Competing in the 2013–14 JGP series, Bent/MacKeen won gold in Riga, Latvia and finished 6th in Košice, Slovakia. After winning the junior title at the 2014 Canadian Championships, they were assigned to the 2014 World Junior Championships in Sofia, Bulgaria; they placed 9th in the short, 12th in the free, and 12th overall.

During the 2014–15 JGP season, Bent/MacKeen won gold in Ostrava, Czech Republic and silver in Tallinn, Estonia. Their results qualified them for the 2014–15 JGP Final in Barcelona, where they placed fourth. Having already won the junior title, they were required to compete on the senior level at the 2015 Canadian Championships. They finished 6th and were sent again to Tallinn to compete at their third Junior Worlds. They came in 5th after ranking second in the short and 8th in the free. They parted ways at the end of the season.

In 2015, Garrett left the competitive skating and became a dance partner for skating clubs in the Kingston and Toronto areas.

== Programs ==
(with Bent)

Season	Short dance	Free dance
2014–2015	Rhumba: Vida Loca by Francisco Cespedes; Samba: Straight to Memphis by Club des Belugas choreo. by Carol Lane, Juris Razgulajevs	Once Upon a Time by Mark Isham; Zombie Fight by Ilan Eshkeri choreo. by Asher Hill, Carol Lane, Juris Razgulajevs
2013–2014	Quickstep: Let's Start Tomorrow Night; Foxtrot: Movin' the Line; Quickstep: Let's Be Bad by Marc Shaiman	Yesterday Once More; Fun Fun Fun; End of the World performed by Carpenters; Hard Jive performed by Sha Na Na
2012–2013	Blues: History Is Made At Night by Marc Shaiman; Swing: I Never Met A Wolf Who Didn't Love	Misterio Y Fuego performed by Ensemble Vivant

== Competitive highlights ==
JGP: Junior Grand Prix

With Bent

International
Event	2011–12	2012–13	2013–14	2014–15
Junior Worlds		5th	12th	5th
JGP Final				4th
JGP Austria		3rd		
JGP Croatia		4th		
JGP Czech Rep.				1st
JGP Estonia	5th			2nd
JGP Latvia			1st	
JGP Romania	3rd			
JGP Slovakia			6th	
National
Canadian Champ.	4th J.	2nd J.	1st J.	6th
