= Alla Loboda =

Russian ice dancer (born 1998)

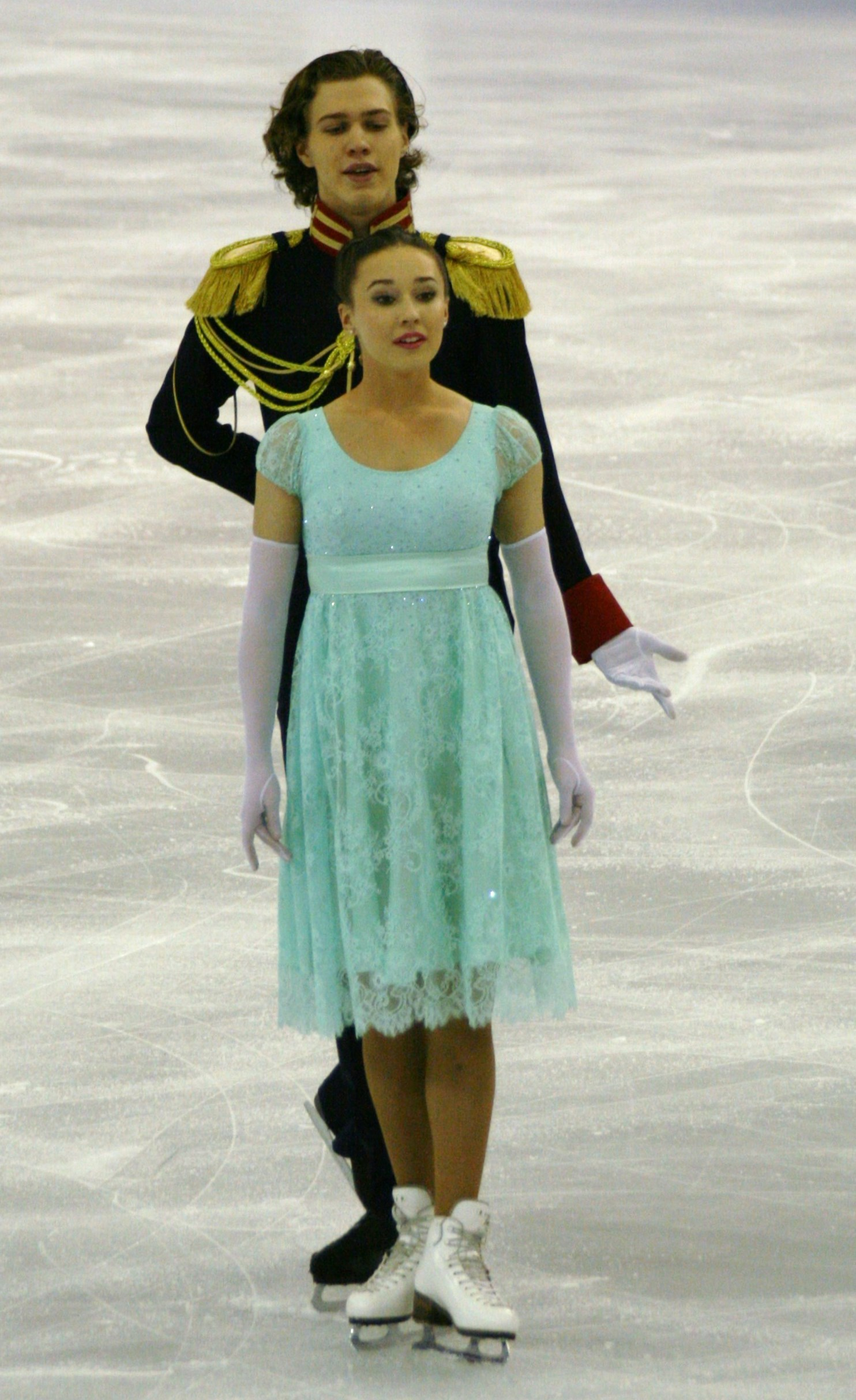
- Loboda/Drozd at the 2015–16 Junior Grand Prix Final

Personal information
- Native name: Алла Андреевна Лобода
- Full name: Alla Andreyevna Loboda
- Born: 10 December 1998 (age 27) Moscow, Russia
- Height: 1.67 m (5 ft 5 1/2 in)

Figure skating career
- Country: Russia
- Coach: Anjelika Krylova, Oleg Volkov
- Skating club: Megasport
- Retired: July 30, 2019
Medal record
Representing Russia
Figure skating: Ice dancing
World Junior Championships
Silver medal – second place	2017 Taipei	Ice dancing
Bronze medal – third place	2016 Debrecen	Ice dancing
Junior Grand Prix Final
Silver medal – second place	2016–17 Marseille	Ice dancing
Silver medal – second place	2015–16 Barcelona	Ice dancing
Silver medal – second place	2014–15 Barcelona	Ice dancing

Alla Andreyevna Loboda (Russian: Алла Андреевна Лобода; born 10 December 1998) is a Russian former competitive ice dancer. With her former skating partner Pavel Drozd, she is a two-time World Junior medalist (silver in 2017, bronze in 2016), a three-time JGP Final silver medalist (2014–15, 2015–16, 2016–17), and the 2016 Russian junior national champion.

== Personal life ==
Alla Andreyevna Loboda was born on 10 December 1998 in Moscow. She graduated from secondary school in the spring of 2016, planning to enroll at a sports institute. Her elder sister, Lilia, is an economist.

== Career ==
=== Early years ===
Loboda began learning to skate at age four. She trained in single skating at CSKA Moscow, coached by Sofia Kitasheva, before trying out successfully at Ksenia Rumiantseva's ice dancing school around 2009. She competed with Emil Samvelian from 2010 to 2012.

=== Start of partnership with Drozd ===
On 10 March 2012, Loboda began skating with Pavel Drozd, who trained under the same coaches. Led by Ksenia Rumiantseva and Ekaterina Volobueva in Moscow, they placed 11th at the 2013 Russian Junior Championships.

=== 2013–2014 season ===
Loboda/Drozd debuted on the ISU Junior Grand Prix (JGP) series in the 2013–14 season, obtaining bronze medals in Riga, Latvia and Gdańsk, Poland. They finished fifth at the 2014 Russian Junior Championships.

=== 2014–2015 season ===
Loboda/Drozd's first assignment of the 2014–15 JGP season was in Courchevel, France. Ranked second in the short dance and first in the free dance, they won the gold medal by a margin of 2.82 points over Canada's Madeline Edwards / Zhao Kai Pang. They took silver in Aichi, Japan, finishing second to Edwards/Pang by 0.44 points. Loboda/Drozd qualified for the JGP Final in Barcelona, where they won the silver medal behind teammates Anna Yanovskaya / Sergey Mozgov. Having finished 4th at the 2015 Russian Junior Championships, they were not named in Russia's team to the 2015 World Junior Championships.

=== 2015–2016 season ===
In the 2015–16 JGP season, Loboda/Drozd won the silver medal in Bratislava, Slovakia, and then gold in Linz, Austria, before taking silver behind Americans Lorraine McNamara / Quinn Carpenter at the 2015–16 JGP Final in Barcelona. After winning their first junior national title, they were awarded the bronze medal at the 2016 World Junior Championships in Debrecen, Hungary, having finished third behind McNamara/Carpenter and Rachel Parsons / Michael Parsons.

=== 2016–2017 season ===
Competing in the 2016–17 JGP season, Loboda/Drozd won gold medals in Saransk, Russia, and Tallinn, Estonia. In December 2016, they were awarded the silver medal behind the Parsons at the 2016–17 JGP Final in Marseille, France.

In March 2017 they won the silver medal at the 2017 World Junior Championships.

=== 2017–2018 season ===
Loboda/Drozd started their senior career by winning the silver medal at the 2017 CS Lombardia Trophy. In October 2017 they made their Grand Prix debut at the 2017 Skate Canada where they placed 5th. Next month they competed at their 2nd GP event of the season, the 2017 Internationaux de France, where they placed 9th. In December 2017 they competed at the 2018 Russian Championships where they placed 6th after placing 6th in both the short dance and the free dance.

Anjelika Krylova and Oleg Volkov became their new coaches in May 2018. Loboda and Drozd ended their partnership by July 2018.

=== 2018–2019 season ===
Loboda teamed up with Anton Shibnev in summer 2018. Loboda/Shibnev made their international debut at the 2019 Egna Trophy where they won the bronze medal.

== Programs ==
(with Drozd)

Season	Short dance	Free dance	Exhibition
2017–2018	Samba: Largadinho by Claudia Leitte; Rhumba: Diles by Malú; Samba: Toma Que Toma by Furia Gitana	Chicago (musical soundtrack)	Sous le ciel de Paris by Zaz, Pablo Alborán
2016–2017	Blues: St. Louis Blues; Swing	Malagueña by Ernesto Lecuona choreo. by Benoît Richaud	
2015–2016	Waltz: Nr. 10 in H minor, op. 69.2 by Frédéric Chopin; March: Storming Pleven (from The Turkish Gambit)	Lo ti penso amore performed by David Garrett, Nicole Scherzinger; Caprice No. 5 performed by Edvin Marton	The Winner Takes It All by ABBA
2014–2015	Samba: Samabando; Rhumba; Samba	Giselle by Adolphe Adam	
2013–2014	Quickstep: Jeepers Creepers by Bennett Salvay; Foxtrot: Work Song by Chantz	Vivo per lei performed by Andrea Bocelli, Hélène Ségara; Dance of the Knights (from Romeo and Juliet) by Sergei Prokofiev; Vivo per lei	
2012–2013	That's Life; Time to Swing by Helmut Lotti	Scheherazade by Nikolai Rimsky-Korsakov	

== Records and achievements ==
(with Drozd)

- Set the junior-level ice dance record for the combined total score to 164.37 points at the 2017 World Junior Championships.

== Competitive highlights ==
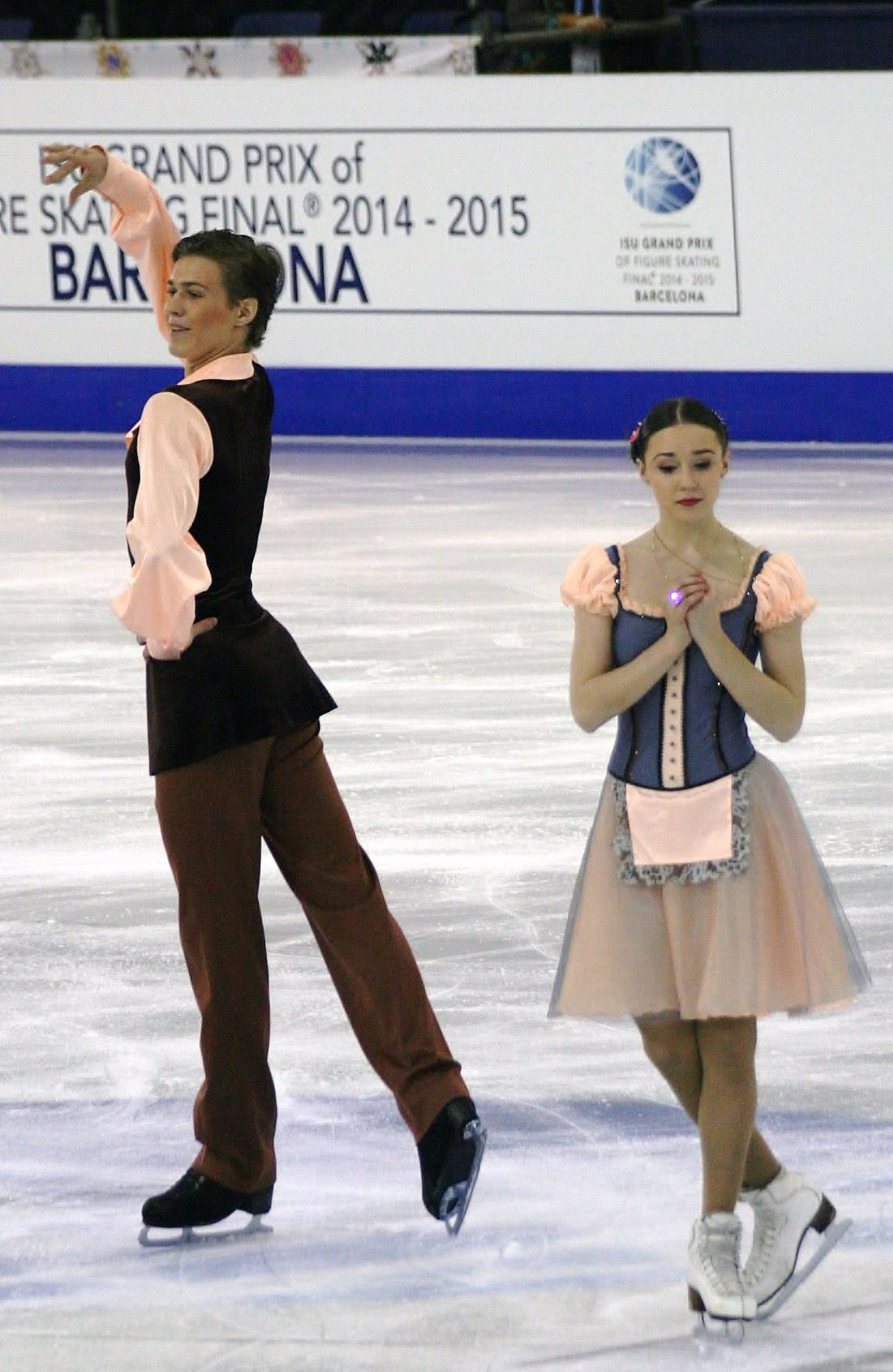
Loboda/Drozd at the 2014-15 Junior Grand Prix Final

GP: Grand Prix; CS: Challenger Series; JGP: Junior Grand Prix

=== With Shibnev ===
International
Event	2018–19
Egna Dance Trophy	3rd

=== With Drozd ===
International
Event	12–13	13–14	14–15	15–16	16–17	17–18
GP France						9th
GP Skate Canada						5th
CS Golden Spin						10th
CS Lombardia						2nd
Shanghai Trophy						4th
International: Junior
Junior Worlds				3rd	2nd	
JGP Final			2nd	2nd	2nd	
JGP Austria				1st		
JGP Estonia					1st	
JGP France			1st			
JGP Japan			2nd			
JGP Latvia		3rd				
JGP Poland		3rd				
JGP Russia					1st	
JGP Slovakia				2nd		
Ice Challenge	3rd					
National
Russian Champ.						6th
Russian Jr. Champ.	11th	5th	4th	1st	2nd	

== Detailed results ==
=== With Shibnev ===
2018–2019 season
Date	Event	RD	FD	Total
1–3 February 2019	2019 Egna Trophy	2; 64.98	5; 87.50	3; 152.48

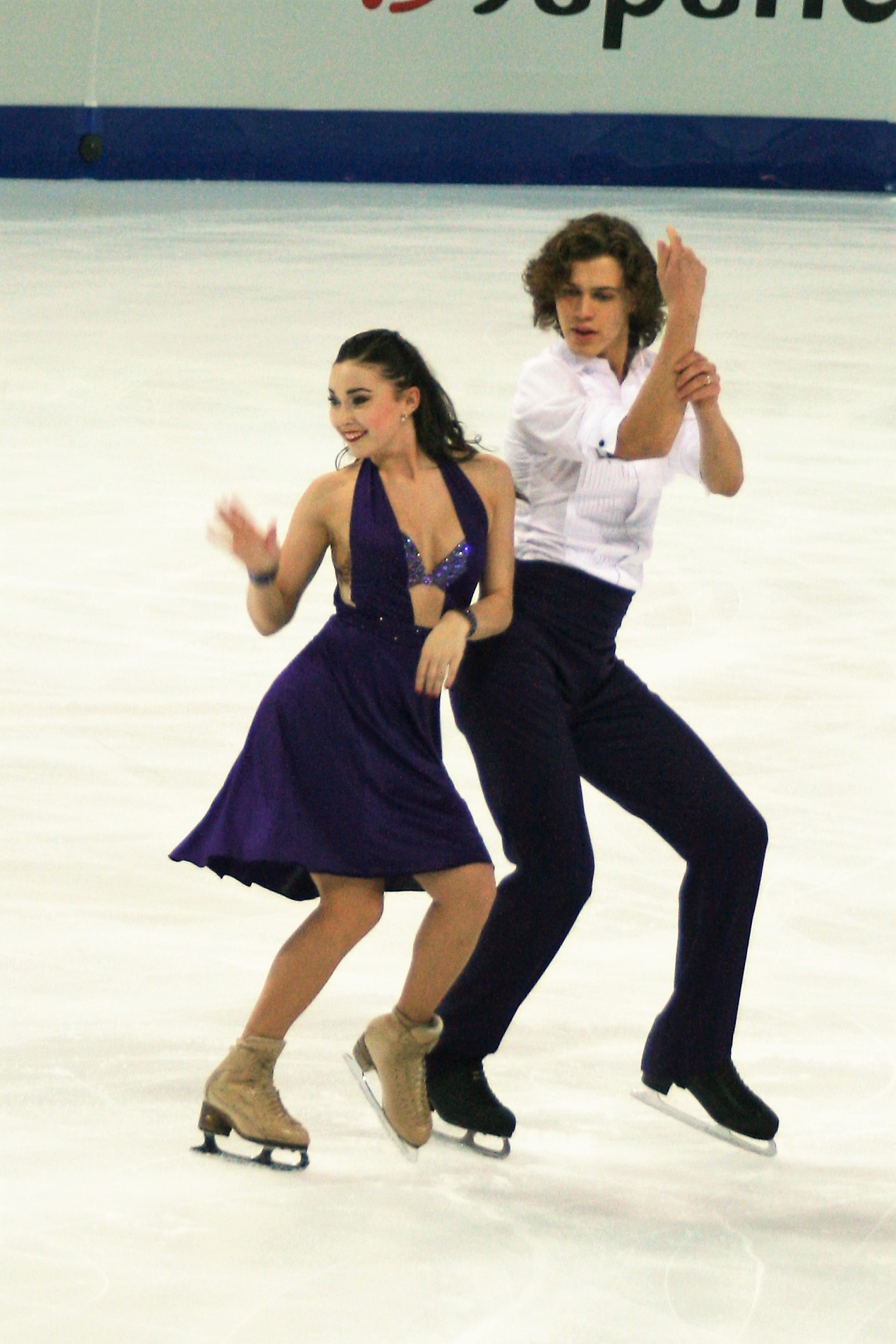
Loboda/Drozd at the 2016-16 Junior Grand Prix Final

Small medals for short and free programs awarded only at ISU Championships.

=== With Drozd ===
2017–18 season
Date	Event	SD	FD	Total
21–24 December 2017	2018 Russian Championships	6; 63.07	6; 96.92	6; 159.99
6–9 December 2017	2017 CS Golden Spin of Zagreb	11; 59.42	9; 90.90	10; 150.32
24–26 November 2017	2017 Shanghai Trophy	–	4; 95.27	4; 95.27
17–19 November 2017	2017 Internationaux de France	7; 60.43	9; 85.42	9; 145.85
27–29 October 2017	2017 Skate Canada	6; 62.60	5; 93.12	5; 155.72
14–17 September 2017	2017 CS Lombardia Trophy	2; 63.34	2; 91.06	2; 154.40

2016–17 season
Date	Event	Level	SD	FD	Total
15–19 March 2017	2017 World Junior Championships	Junior	1; 67.59	2; 96.78	2; 164.37
1–5 February 2017	2017 Russian Junior Championships	Junior	1; 69.40	4; 88.59	2; 157.99
8–11 December 2016	2016−17 JGP Final	Junior	1; 67.58	2; 94.29	2; 161.87
28 September – 2 October 2016	2016 JGP Estonia	Junior	1; 65.54	1; 91.47	1; 157.01
14–18 September 2016	2016 JGP Russia	Junior	1; 64.96	1; 96.91	1; 161.87
2015–16 season
Date	Event	Level	SD	FD	Total
14–20 March 2016	2016 World Junior Championships	Junior	6; 58.93	3; 92.26	3; 151.19
19–23 January 2016	2016 Russian Junior Championships	Junior	1; 68.84	2; 96.06	1; 164.90
10–13 December 2015	2015−16 JGP Final	Junior	3; 64.01	2; 86.85	2; 150.86
9–13 September 2015	2015 JGP Austria	Junior	1; 61.73	1; 91.91	1; 153.64
19–23 August 2015	2015 JGP Slovakia	Junior	1; 60.48	2; 86.90	2; 147.38
2014–15 season
Date	Event	Level	SD	FD	Total
4–7 February 2015	2015 Russian Junior Championships	Junior	2; 61.84	5; 78.53	4; 140.37
11–14 December 2014	2014–15 JGP Final	Junior	2; 53.72	2; 82.59	2; 136.31
10–14 September 2014	2014 JGP Japan	Junior	3; 52.25	1; 81.73	2; 133.98
20–24 August 2014	2014 JGP France	Junior	2; 50.10	1; 82.34	1; 132.44
2013–14 season
Date	Event	Level	SD	FD	Total
23–25 January 2014	2014 Russian Junior Championships	Junior	5; 58.53	3; 86.66	5; 145.19
19–21 September 2013	2013 JGP Poland	Junior	3; 54.55	3; 79.56	3; 134.11
29–31 August 2013	2013 JGP Latvia	Junior	3; 50.93	1; 75.50	3; 126.43
2012–13 season
Date	Event	Level	SD	FD	Total
1–3 February 2013	2013 Russian Junior Championships	Junior	12; 41.22	11; 66.04	11; 107.26
