= Mark Bardei =

Ukrainian pair skater

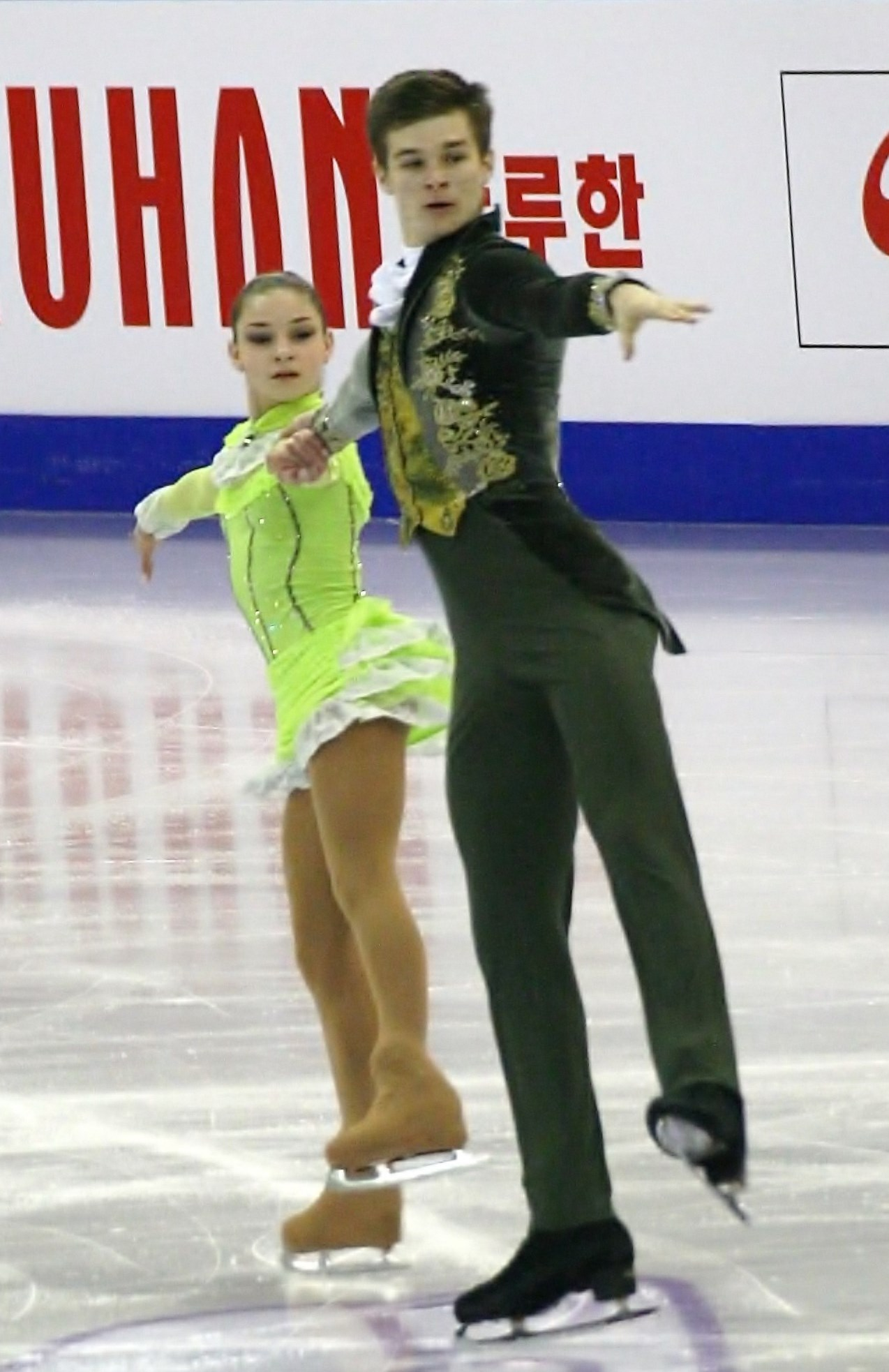
- Bardei with Ohanesian in December 2015

Personal information
- Native name: Марк Бардей
- Other names: Bardey
- Born: 15 July 1996 (age 30) Dnipropetrovsk, Ukraine
- Height: 1.90 m (6 ft 3 in)

Figure skating career
- Country: Canada
- Coach: Lilia Batutina
- Skating club: ShVSM Dnipropetrovsk
- Began skating: 2001

Mark Bardei (Ukrainian: Марк Бардей, born 15 July 1996) is a Ukrainian pair skater. With former partner, Justine Brasseur for Canada, he is the 2019 CS Warsaw Cup bronze medalist.

He previously represented Ukraine with former partner Renata Ohanesian. They won three ISU Junior Grand Prix medals, including gold at 2015 JGP Latvia, and three Ukrainian senior national titles, and placed fourth at the 2016 World Junior Championships.

== Career ==
=== Early years ===
Bardei began learning to skate in 2001. He and Renata Ohanesian made their international debut in March 2012 at the International Challenge Cup, placing fifth in junior pairs.

=== 2014–2015 season ===
In the 2014–15 season, Ohanesian/Bardei won the junior gold medal at the Lombardia Trophy in September 2014. The following week, they competed at their first ISU Junior Grand Prix (JGP) assignment, placing second in the short program, eighth in the free skate, and fifth overall at the event in Tallinn, Estonia. In October, they took the bronze medal at a JGP event in Zagreb, Croatia, having climbed from seventh place after the short program.

Ohanesian/Bardei won both the senior and junior national titles and were selected to represent Ukraine at the World Junior Championships in March 2015 in Tallinn. After placing twelfth in the short program, they withdrew from the competition due to Bardei's illness.

=== 2015–2016 season ===
Ohanesian/Bardei's first assignment of the 2015–16 JGP series took place in late August in Riga, Latvia. Ranked first in the short and second in the free, they won the gold medal ahead of Russian pairs Anastasia Poluianova / Stepan Korotkov and Ekaterina Borisova / Dmitry Sopot. In September, they took bronze at the JGP in Linz, Austria, having ranked third in both segments, and qualified for the JGP Final. They placed fifth at the latter event, which was held in December in Barcelona, Spain.

Ohanesian/Bardei repeated as national champions on both the senior and junior levels. Their training was limited in January 2016 due to problems with the ice at their rink in Dnipropetrovsk. At the 2016 World Junior Championships in Debrecen, Hungary, the pair won a small bronze medal for the short program and finished fourth overall.

=== 2016–2017 season ===
During the 2016–17 ISU Junior Grand Prix, Ohanesian/Bardei finished sixth in Tallinn and 10th in Dresden. Making their senior international debut, they placed tenth at the 2016 CS Golden Spin of Zagreb in December. They withdrew from the 2017 European Championships after Ohanesian was diagnosed with a cardiovascular health problem. In April 2017, the Ukrainian Figure Skating Federation stated that their partnership had ended.

=== 2017–2018 season ===
In September 2017, Bardei appeared with Justine Brasseur on the entry list for a Quebec competition. They later withdrew from the event.

=== 2018–2019 season ===
Brasseur/Bardei were scheduled to make their international debut at the 2018 CS Golden Spin of Zagreb, but withdrew from the event. They competed at the 2019 Canadian Championships, placing fifth overall, and coming third in the free skate. Brasseur deemed it "not our best performance", but both enjoyed competing again after some years away.

=== 2019–2020 season ===
Making their international debut together, Brasseur/Bardei competed on the Challenger series at the 2019 CS Warsaw Cup. Fourth in the short program and third in the free skate, they won the bronze medal. Bardei noted that he had seen his parents in person for the first time since leaving Ukraine in 2017. They placed fourth at the 2020 Canadian Championships.

In April, it was announced that they had split.

== Programs ==
=== With Brasseur ===
Season	Short program	Free skating
2018–2019	Way Down We Go by Kaleo choreo. by Julie Marcotte	Il etait une fois le diable by Ennio Morricone performed by Angèle Dubeau & La Pietà choreo. by Julie Marcotte

=== With Ohanesian ===
Season	Short program	Free skating	Exhibition
2016–2017	The Race II by Yello	The Sands of Time (from Prince of Persia: The Sands of Time) by Harry Gregson-Williams	
2015–2016	The Race II by Yello	Interview with the Vampire by Elliot Goldenthal	Thunderstruck by David Garrett
2014–2015	Thunderstruck by David Garrett	Sabre Dance (from Gayaneh) by Aram Khachaturian	

== Competitive highlights ==
CS: Challenger Series; JGP: Junior Grand Prix

=== With Brasseur for Canada ===
International
Event	2018–19	2019–20
CS Warsaw Cup		3rd
Challenge Cup	WD	
National
Canadian Championships	5th	4th
WD = Withdrew; TBD = Assigned

=== With Ohanesian for Ukraine ===
International
Event	11–12	12–13	14–15	15–16	16–17
Europeans					WD
CS Golden Spin					10th
International: Junior
Junior Worlds			WD	4th	
JGP Final				5th	
JGP Austria				3rd	
JGP Croatia			3rd		
JGP Estonia			5th		6th
JGP Germany					10th
JGP Latvia				1st	
Bavarian Open				2nd J	
Challenge Cup	5th J		2nd J		
Lombardia Trophy			1st J		
National
Ukrainian Champ.			1st	1st	1st
Ukrainian Junior		1st	1st	1st	
J = Junior level; WD = Withdrew
