= Kirill Aleshin =

Russian ice dancer (born 1997)

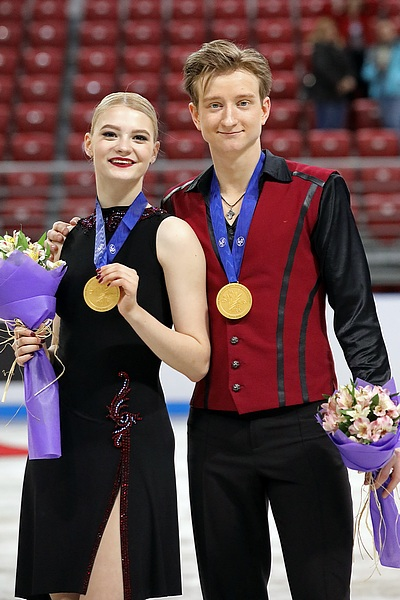
- Skoptsova/Aleshin at the 2018 World Junior Championships

Personal information
- Native name: Кирилл Павлович Алёшин
- Full name: Kirill Pavlovich Aleshin
- Other names: Alyoshin
- Born: 24 April 1997 (age 29) Omsk, Russia
- Height: 1.78 m (5 ft 10 in)

Figure skating career
- Country: Russia
- Began skating: 2004
Medal record
Representing Russia
Figure skating: Ice dancing
World Junior Championships
Gold medal – first place	2018 Sofia	Ice dancing
Junior Grand Prix Final
Gold medal – first place	2017–18 Nagoya	Ice dancing
Winter Youth Olympics
Bronze medal – third place	2016 Lillehammer	Ice dancing
Representing Mixed-NOCs
Winter Youth Olympics
Gold medal – first place	2016 Lillehammer	Team

Kirill Pavlovich Aleshin (Russian: Кирилл Павлович Алёшин; born 24 April 1997) is a Russian retired ice dancer. With his former skating partner, Anastasia Skoptsova, he was the 2020 Rostelecom Cup bronze medalist, 2018 CS Tallinn Trophy silver medalist, and 2021 Russian national bronze medalist.

Earlier in their career, they won gold at the 2018 World Junior Championships and 2017 Junior Grand Prix Final, as well as bronze at the 2016 Winter Youth Olympics.

== Early life ==
Kirill Pavlovich Aleshin was born on 24 April 1997 in Omsk, Russia.

== Career ==
=== Early years ===
Aleshin began learning to skate in 2004. As a child, he was taught by Tatiana Odinokova in Omsk. From 2009–2010 to 2011–2012, he skated with Evgenia Cherpakova in Saint Petersburg.

=== Beginning of partnership with Skoptsova ===
Aleshin teamed up with Anastasia Skoptsova after she contacted him through a Russian partner search. They began competing together in October 2013. They qualified to the 2015 Russian Junior Championships and finished ninth, having ranked ninth in the short and seventh in the free dance.

=== 2015–2016 season: Junior Grand Prix debut ===
Skoptsova/Aleshin's first Junior Grand Prix (JGP) assignments came in the 2015–2016 season. They won the bronze medal at the JGP in Toruń, Poland, after placing third in both segments behind Lorraine McNamara / Quinn Carpenter and Christina Carreira / Anthony Ponomarenko. At the JGP in Zagreb, Croatia, Skoptsova/Aleshin placed second in both segments and won the silver medal, scoring 12 points less than Rachel Parsons / Michael Parsons (gold) and almost five points more than Sofia Shevchenko / Igor Eremenko (bronze). Ranked 6th in the JGP standings, they took the final spot at the 2015–16 JGP Final in Barcelona, where they finished sixth.

Fifth at the 2016 Russian Junior Championships (seventh in the short dance, fourth in the free), the two were named in Russia's team to the 2016 Winter Youth Olympics in Hamar. Ranked second in the short dance and third in the free, they were awarded the bronze medal in the ice dancing event in Norway. They won gold in the mixed NOC team event.

=== 2016–2017 season ===
In late September, Skoptsova/Aleshin won bronze at a JGP event in Ljubljana, Slovenia; they finished third behind Lorraine McNamara / Quinn Carpenter and Sofia Polishchuk / Alexander Vakhnov. A week later, they received silver at a JPG assignment in Tallinn, Estonia, where they placed second to Alla Loboda / Pavel Drozd. They finished as the first alternates for the JGP Final.

In February, Skoptsova/Aleshin took bronze at the 2017 Russian Junior Championships, finishing behind Anastasia Shpilevaya / Grigory Smirnov and Loboda/Drozd. They were included in Russia's team to the 2017 World Junior Championships, held in March in Taipei, Taiwan, and finished fifth overall after placing third in the short dance and fifth in the free dance.

=== 2017–2018 season: World Junior title ===
Skoptsova/Aleshin began their JGP season in September, in Minsk, Belarus; they were awarded the silver medal, having finished 6.41 points behind Christina Carreira / Anthony Ponomarenko of the United States. In October, they won gold at a JGP event in Gdańsk, Poland, defeating their closest rivals, Elizaveta Khudaiberdieva / Nikita Nazarov, by 16.93 points. Due to their results, they qualified to the 2017 Junior Grand Prix Final, held in December in Nagoya, Japan. They placed first in both segments in Japan, winning gold with a 1.85 point margin over silver medalists Carreira/Ponomarenko.

Skoptsova/Aleshin won gold at the 2018 Russian Junior Championships in January. They ranked first in both segments on their way to the gold medal at the 2018 World Junior Championships, held in March in Sofia, Bulgaria. They outscored the silver medalists (Carreira/Ponomarenko) by 7.47 points overall.

=== 2018–2019 season: Senior debut ===
Skoptsova suffered from a recurrence of an ankle injury over the summer that limited the duo's training time leading up to the new season. In late October Skoptsova/Aleshin made their international senior and Grand Prix debut at the 2018 Skate Canada where they placed 10th. Two weeks later they finished 7th at the 2018 NHK Trophy.

In late November Skoptsova/Aleshin won their first international senior medal at the 2018 CS Tallinn Trophy. Ranked first in the rhythm dance and third in the free dance they won the silver medal with their personal best score of 179.78 points. At the 2019 Russian Championships, they placed fifth.

=== 2019–2020 season ===
Skoptcova/Aleshin had to withdraw from the Russian test skates prior to skating their free dance due to Aleshin becoming ill, and withdrew from the Finlandia Trophy and the Ice Star. Consequently, they started their competition season at the 2019 Cup of China on the Grand Prix, placing seventh. At the 2019 Rostelecom Cup, they were ninth of ten teams.

Skoptcova/Aleshin placed fifth at the 2020 Russian Championships.

=== 2020–2021 season: Grand Prix and national bronze medals ===
Skoptcova/Aleshin debuted at the senior Russian test skates, repeating their programs from the previous season due to the COVID-19 pandemic. They competed on the domestic Cup of Russia series, winning the gold medal at stage four in Kazan by almost 34 points.

With the Grand Prix allotted based mainly on geographic location, Skoptcova/Aleshin competed at the 2020 Rostelecom Cup, placing third in the rhythm dance. Third in the free dance as well, they won their first Grand Prix medal, a bronze.

With reigning national champions Sinitsina/Katsalapov sitting out the 2021 Russian Championships due to COVID-19 illness, the bronze medal position on the national podium was widely perceived to be open to contest between several teams, Skoptcova/Aleshin among them. They placed third in the rhythm dance. Due to a twizzle error from Skoptcova, they placed fourth in the free dance, but remained in third place overall to take bronze, standing on the senior national podium for the first time.

Following the national championships, Stepanova/Bukin participated in the 2021 Channel One Trophy, a televised team competition held in lieu of the cancelled European Championships. They were selected for the Time of Firsts team captained by Evgenia Medvedeva. They placed first in both their segments of the competition, while their team finished in second overall. They did not participate in the Russian Cup Final.

=== 2021–2022 season ===
Skoptsova and Aleshin debuted their programs at the Russian senior test skates. They won a gold medal at the 2021 CS Denis Ten Memorial Challenge, and then were sixth at the 2021 Rostelecom Cup. They went on to win another gold at the Santa Claus Cup.

At the 2022 Russian Championships, Skoptsova/Aleshin placed sixth. Speaking after the free dance, Skoptsova noted that Aleshin had had twizzle problems, but that otherwise she felt it "was emotional, soulful, beautiful, sublime, and tender and we are very proud of ourselves and the coaches." This proved to be their final competition, as at the end of the season they announced their retirement, with Aleshin saying he would begin working as a coach.

== Programs ==
(with Skoptsova)

Season	Rhythm dance	Free dance
2021–2022	Uptown Funk by Mark Ronson, feat. Bruno Mars; Bad to the Bone by George Thorogood and the Destroyers	Kissing You (from Romeo + Juliet) by Des'ree; The Cheek of Night (from Romeo & Juliet); Abdication (from W.E.) by Abel Korzeniowski
2019–2021	Blues: Raise a Little Hell performed by Jeremy Jordan; Foxtrot: How 'bout a Dance performed by Laura Osnes; Quickstep: This World Will Remember Us performed by Jeremy Jordan & Laura Osnes (from Bonnie & Clyde) by Frank Wildhorn & Don Black	Never Tear Us Apart (from Fifty Shades Freed) by Andrew Farriss & Michael Hutchence performed by L'Orchestra Cinematique; Earned It (from Fifty Shades of Grey) by The Weeknd
2018–2019	Tango: Viejos Aires performed by Ara Malikian; Tango: Yo Soy Maria performed by Maria Volonte	Bad by Michael Jackson performed by Billie Eilish; Dangerous (Immortal Version); They Don't Care About Us by Michael Jackson
	Short dance	
2017–2018	Rhumba: Historia de un amor performed by Cesária Évora, Tania Libertad; Cha Cha; Samba	Tango by Gotan Project
2016–2017	Blues: At Last by Michael Bolton; Swing: Swing Baby by Park Jin-young	O Mar E Tu by Dulce Pontes, George Dalaras
2015–2016	Foxtrot: Zydeko (from Cirque du Soleil: Quidam); Waltz: Algo pequeñito by Daniel Diges	Iko Iko by Club des Belugas feat. Brenda Boykin; Hasta Siempre Comandante; Straight to Memphis
2014–2015	Hip Hip Chin Chin by Club des Belugas; Sweet Dreams (Are Made of This) by Eurythmics	Ukrainian folk dance: Unharness your horses, boys! (Ukrainian: Розпрягайте, хлопці, коні); Moon in the sky (Ukrainian: Місяць на небі)
2013–2014	That Man by Caro Emerald; St. James Infirmary by Ray Condo and His Hardrock Goners	Ukrainian folk dance: Unharness your horses, boys! (Ukrainian: Розпрягайте, хлопці, коні); Moon in the sky (Ukrainian: Місяць на небі)

== Competitive highlights ==
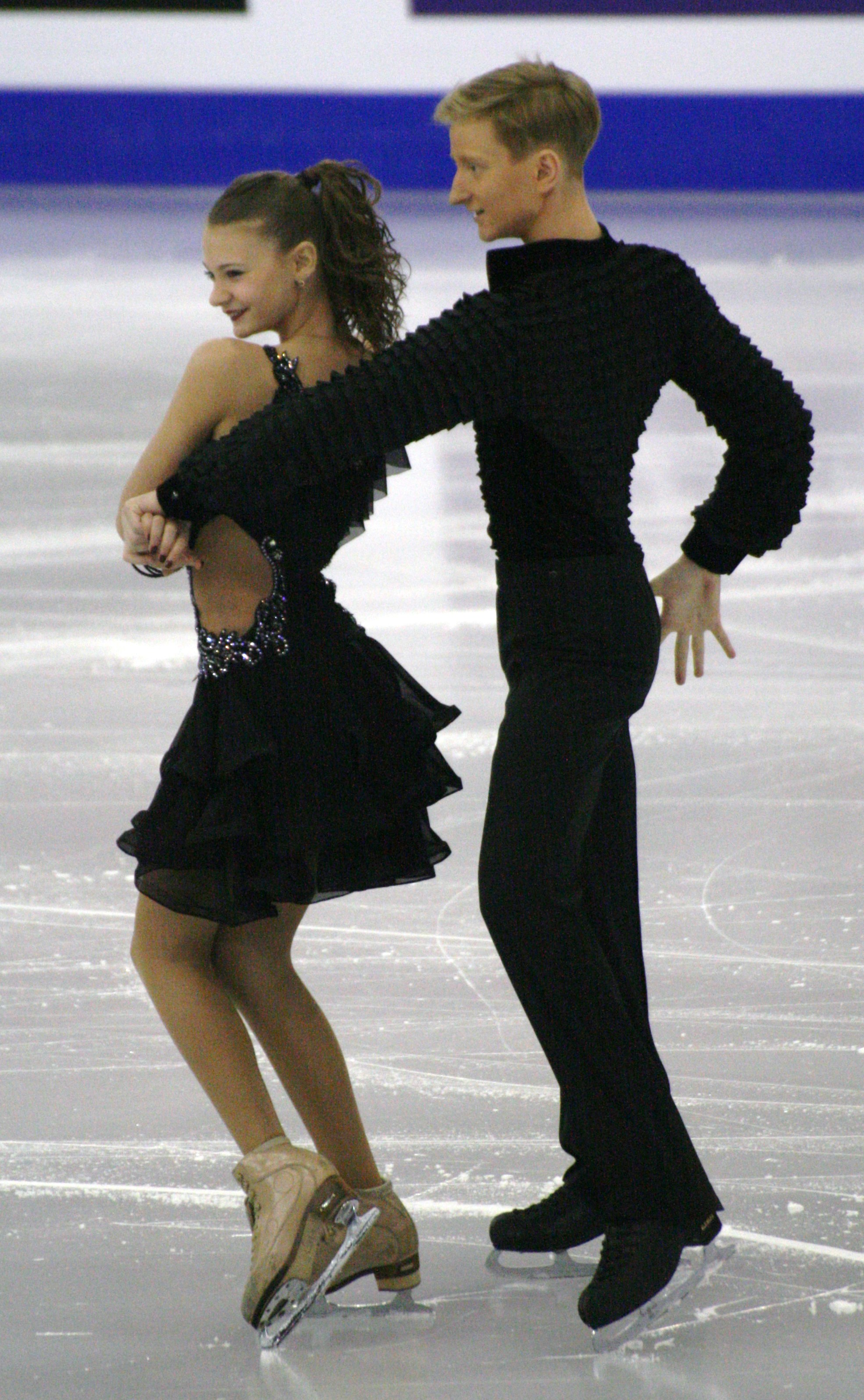
Skoptsova/Aleshin at the 2015–16 Junior Grand Prix Final

GP: Grand Prix; CS: Challenger Series; JGP: Junior Grand Prix

With Skoptsova

International
Event	13–14	14–15	15–16	16–17	17–18	18–19	19–20	20–21	21–22
GP Cup of China							7th		
GP NHK Trophy						7th			
GP Rostelecom							9th	3rd	6th
GP Skate Canada						10th			
CS Denis Ten Memorial									1st
CS Finlandia							WD		
CS Ice Star							WD		
CS Tallinn Trophy						2nd			
Egna Trophy							2nd		
Santa Claus Cup							1st		1st
Universiade						WD			
International: Junior
Junior Worlds				5th	1st				
Youth Olympics			3rd						
JGP Final			6th		1st				
JGP Belarus					2nd				
JGP Croatia			2nd						
JGP Estonia				2nd					
JGP Poland			3rd		1st				
JGP Slovenia				3rd					
Tallinn Trophy				1st	1st				
Volvo Open Cup		4th							
National
Russian Champ.						5th	5th	3rd	6th
Russian Junior		9th	5th	3rd	1st				
Russian Youth; Elder Age	4th								
Team events
Youth Olympics			1st T 2nd P						
TBD = Assigned; WD = Withdrew; T = Team result; P = Personal result. Medals awarded for team result only.

== Detailed results ==
Small medals for short and free programs awarded only at ISU Championships.

With Skoptsova

2021–22 season
Date	Event	RD	FD	Total
21–26 December 2021	2022 Russian Championships	7; 75.36	6; 110.36	6; 185.72
6–12 December 2021	2021 Santa Claus Cup	1; 81.17	1; 118.24	1; 199.41
26–28 November 2021	2021 Rostelecom Cup	6; 71.95	6; 108.98	6; 180.93
28–31 October 2021	2021 CS Denis Ten Memorial Challenge	1; 78.39	1; 116.67	1; 195.06
2020–21 season
Date	Event	RD	FD	Total
5–7 February 2021	2021 Channel One Trophy	3; 81.42	3; 123.34	2T/3P; 204.76
23–27 December 2020	2021 Russian Championships	3; 80.19	4; 116.78	3; 196.97
5–8 December 2020	2020 Cup of Russia Series, 5th Stage, Moscow domestic competition	1; 81.81	1; 123.17	1; 204.98
20–22 November 2020	2020 Rostelecom Cup	3; 79.75	3; 119.50	3; 199.25
8–12 November 2020	2020 Cup of Russia Series, 4th Stage, Kazan domestic competition	1; 79.36	1; 120.20	1; 199.56
2019–20 season
Date	Event	RD	FD	Total
7–9 February 2020	2020 Egna Trophy	1; 74.04	2; 108.53	2; 182.57
24–29 December 2019	2020 Russian Championships	4; 73.98	5; 112.83	5; 186.81
2–8 December 2019	2019 Santa Claus Cup	1; 72.75	1; 109.34	1; 182.09
15–17 November 2019	2019 Rostelecom Cup	7; 66.52	9; 98.12	9; 164.64
8–10 November 2019	2019 Cup of China	6; 69.19	8; 100.15	7; 169.34
2018–19 season
Date	Event	RD	FD	Total
19–23 December 2018	2019 Russian Championships	6; 69.00	5; 106.10	5; 175.10
26 November – 2 December 2018	2018 CS Tallinn Trophy	1; 71.17	3; 108.61	2; 179.78
9–11 November 2018	2018 NHK Trophy	6; 64.53	7; 95.43	7; 159.96
26–28 October 2018	2018 Skate Canada	7; 62.68	10; 85.31	10; 147.99

2017–18 season
Date	Event	Level	SD	FD	Total
5–11 March 2018	2018 World Junior Championships	Junior	1; 66.44	1; 88.71	1; 155.15
23–26 January 2018	2018 Russian Junior Championships	Junior	1; 69.54	1; 92.89	1; 162.43
7–10 December 2017	2017–18 JGP Final	Junior	1; 65.87	1; 87.74	1; 153.61
21–26 November 2017	2017 Tallinn Trophy	Junior	1; 67.53	1; 88.94	1; 156.47
4–7 October 2017	2017 JGP Poland	Junior	1; 64.63	1; 86.15	1; 150.78
20–24 September 2017	2017 JGP Belarus	Junior	2; 61.71	3; 81.93	2; 143.64
2016–17 season
Date	Event	Level	SD	FD	Total
15–19 March 2017	2017 World Junior Championships	Junior	3; 63.38	5; 89.15	5; 152.53
1–5 February 2017	2017 Russian Junior Championships	Junior	3; 62.37	3; 89.68	3; 152.05
20–27 November 2016	2016 Tallinn Trophy	Junior	1; 62.74	1; 86.66	1; 149.40
28 September – 2 October 2016	2016 JGP Estonia	Junior	2; 62.53	2; 85.92	2; 148.45
21–25 September 2016	2016 JGP Slovenia	Junior	2; 56.80	2; 86.98	3; 143.78
2015–16 season
Date	Event	Level	SD	FD	Total
12–21 February 2016	2016 Winter Youth Olympics - Team event	Junior	-	2; 80.28	1
12–21 February 2016	2016 Winter Youth Olympics	Junior	2; 57.75	3; 76.87	3; 134.62
19–23 January 2016	2016 Russian Junior Championships	Junior	7; 59.41	4; 84.81	5; 144.22
10–13 December 2015	2015−16 JGP Final	Junior	6; 56.51	6; 78.10	6; 134.61
7–11 October 2015	2015 JGP Croatia	Junior	2; 60.80	2; 87.95	2; 148.75
23–27 September 2015	2015 JGP Poland	Junior	3; 57.98	3; 83.63	3; 141.61
2014–15 season
Date	Event	Level	SD	FD	Total
4–7 February 2015	2015 Russian Junior Championships	Junior	9; 46.79	7; 73.22	9; 120.01
5–9 November 2014	2014 Volvo Open Cup	Junior	3; 48.05	4; 73.21	4; 121.26
