= 2015–16 ISU Junior Grand Prix =

- Type: ISU Junior Grand Prix
- Date: August 19 – December 13, 2015
- Season: 2015–16
- Previous: 2014–15 ISU Junior Grand Prix
- Next: 2016–17 ISU Junior Grand Prix

The 2015–16 ISU Junior Grand Prix was the 19th season of a series of junior international competitions organized by the International Skating Union. It was the junior-level complement to the 2015–16 ISU Grand Prix of Figure Skating. Medals were awarded in the disciplines of men's singles, ladies' singles, pair skating, and ice dance. At each event, skaters also earned points toward qualifying for the final. The top six skaters or teams from each discipline met at the 2015–16 Junior Grand Prix Final, held together with the senior final.

== Competitions ==
The locations of the JGP events change yearly. In the 2015–16 season, the series was composed of the following events in autumn 2015:

Date	Event	Location	Details	Other notes
August 19–23	2015 ISU Junior Grand Prix in Slovakia	Bratislava, Slovakia	Details	No pairs
August 26–30	2015 ISU Junior Grand Prix in Latvia	Riga, Latvia	Details	
September 2–6	2015 ISU Junior Grand Prix in the United States	Colorado Springs, United States	Details	
September 9–13	2015 ISU Junior Grand Prix in Austria	Linz, Austria	Details	
September 23–27	2015 JGP Toruń Cup	Toruń, Poland	Details	
September 30 – October 4	2015 ISU Junior Grand Prix in Spain	Logroño, Spain	Details	No pairs
October 7–11	2015 JGP Croatia Cup	Zagreb, Croatia	Details	No pairs
December 10–13	2015–16 Junior Grand Prix Final	Barcelona, Spain	Details	Held with senior GPF

== Qualifying ==
Skaters who had reached the age of 13 before July 1, 2015 but had not turned 19 (singles and females of the other two disciplines) or 21 (male pair skaters and ice dancers) were eligible to compete on the junior circuit. Unlike the senior Grand Prix, skaters for the JGP are not seeded by the ISU. The number of entries allotted to each ISU member federation was determined by their skaters' placements in each discipline at the 2015 World Junior Championships.

== Medalists ==
=== Men ===
Competition	Gold	Silver	Bronze	Details
JGP Bratislava	(Canada) Roman Sadovsky	(United States) Vincent Zhou	(Argentina) Denis Margalik	Details
JGP Riga Cup	(Russia) Dmitri Aliev	(Latvia) Deniss Vasiļjevs	(United States) Alexei Krasnozhon	Details
JGP Colorado Springs	(United States) Nathan Chen	(Israel) Daniel Samohin	(Japan) Sota Yamamoto	Details
JGP Cup of Austria	(Russia) Dmitri Aliev	(United States) Vincent Zhou	(Ukraine) Ivan Pavlov	Details
JGP Toruń Cup	(Japan) Sota Yamamoto	(Latvia) Deniss Vasiļjevs	(Canada) Roman Sadovsky	Details
JGP Logroño	(United States) Nathan Chen	(Israel) Daniel Samohin	(China) Zhang He	Details
JGP Croatia Cup	(Russia) Alexander Samarin	(Canada) Nicolas Nadeau	(United States) Tomoki Hiwatashi	Details
JGP Final	(United States) Nathan Chen	(Russia) Dmitri Aliev	(Japan) Sota Yamamoto	Details

=== Ladies ===
Competition	Gold	Silver	Bronze	Details
JGP Bratislava	(Russia) Polina Tsurskaya	(Japan) Mai Mihara	(United States) Vivian Le	Details
JGP Riga Cup	(Russia) Maria Sotskova	(Japan) Kaori Sakamoto	(South Korea) Choi Da-bin	Details
JGP Colorado Springs	(Japan) Yuna Shiraiwa	(Japan) Marin Honda	(United States) Vivian Le	Details
JGP Cup of Austria	(Russia) Maria Sotskova	(Japan) Mai Mihara	(South Korea) Choi Da-bin	Details
JGP Toruń Cup	(Russia) Polina Tsurskaya	(Russia) Ekaterina Mitrofanova	(Japan) Rin Nitaya	Details
JGP Logroño	(Japan) Yuna Shiraiwa	(Russia) Alisa Fedichkina	(Japan) Yura Matsuda	Details
JGP Croatia Cup	(Japan) Marin Honda	(Japan) Wakaba Higuchi	(Russia) Diana Pervushkina	Details
JGP Final	(Russia) Polina Tsurskaya	(Russia) Maria Sotskova	(Japan) Marin Honda	Details

=== Pairs ===
Competition	Gold	Silver	Bronze	Details
JGP Riga Cup	(Ukraine) Renata Ohanesian / Mark Bardei	(Russia) Anastasia Poluianova / Stepan Korotkov	(Russia) Ekaterina Borisova / Dmitry Sopot	Details
JGP Colorado Springs	(Russia) Anastasia Gubanova / Alexei Sintsov	(United States) Joy Weinberg / Maximiliano Fernandez	(Russia) Elena Ivanova / Tagir Khakimov	Details
JGP Cup of Austria	(Russia) Amina Atakhanova / Ilia Spiridonov	(Czech Republic) Anna Dušková / Martin Bidař	(Ukraine) Renata Ohanesian / Mark Bardei	Details
JGP Toruń Cup	(Russia) Ekaterina Borisova / Dmitry Sopot	(Russia) Amina Atakhanova / Ilia Spiridonov	(Russia) Anastasia Gubanova / Alexei Sintsov	Details
JGP Final	(Russia) Ekaterina Borisova / Dmitry Sopot	(Czech Republic) Anna Dušková / Martin Bidař	(Russia) Amina Atakhanova / Ilia Spiridonov	Details

=== Ice dance ===
Competition	Gold	Silver	Bronze	Details
JGP Bratislava	(United States) Rachel Parsons / Michael Parsons	(Russia) Alla Loboda / Pavel Drozd	(Russia) Sofia Shevchenko / Igor Eremenko	Details
JGP Riga Cup	(Russia) Betina Popova / Yuri Vlasenko	(France) Angélique Abachkina / Louis Thauron	(Russia) Sofia Evdokimova / Egor Bazin	Details
JGP Colorado Springs	(United States) Lorraine McNamara / Quinn Carpenter	(Canada) Mackenzie Bent / Dmitre Razgulajevs	(Russia) Sofia Polishchuk / Alexander Vakhnov	Details
JGP Cup of Austria	(Russia) Alla Loboda / Pavel Drozd	(France) Marie-Jade Lauriault / Romain Le Gac	(United States) Julia Biechler / Damian Dodge	Details
JGP Toruń Cup	(United States) Lorraine McNamara / Quinn Carpenter	(United States) Christina Carreira / Anthony Ponomarenko	(Russia) Anastasia Skoptsova / Kirill Aleshin	Details
JGP Logroño	(France) Marie-Jade Lauriault / Romain Le Gac	(Russia) Betina Popova / Yuri Vlasenko	(United States) Elliana Pogrebinsky / Alex Benoit	Details
JGP Croatia Cup	(United States) Rachel Parsons / Michael Parsons	(Russia) Anastasia Skoptsova / Kirill Aleshin	(Russia) Sofia Shevchenko / Igor Eremenko	Details
JGP Final	(United States) Lorraine McNamara / Quinn Carpenter	(Russia) Alla Loboda / Pavel Drozd	(United States) Rachel Parsons / Michael Parsons	Details

== Overall standings ==
=== Medal standings ===
Rank	Nation	Gold	Silver	Bronze	Total
1	Russia (RUS)	14	10	10	34
2	United States (USA)	8	4	7	19
3	Japan (JPN)	4	5	5	14
4	Canada (CAN)	1	2	1	4
5	France (FRA)	1	2	0	3
6	Ukraine (UKR)	1	0	2	3
7	Czech Republic (CZE)	0	2	0	2
7	Israel (ISR)	0	2	0	2
7	Latvia (LAT)	0	2	0	2
10	South Korea (KOR)	0	0	2	2
11	Argentina (ARG)	0	0	1	1
11	China (CHN)	0	0	1	1
Totals (12 entries)		29	29	29	87

=== Standings per nation ===
For the first season, the ISU added standings per nation. Points are calculated for each discipline separately before being combined for a total score per nation. For each discipline, each nation combines the points from up to four JGP events (excluding the final). A country does not have to use the same events for each discipline (e.g. a country can combine points from JGP events in Latvia, United States, Austria, and Poland for pairs while using Slovakia, Austria, Spain, and Croatia for ice dance). For each discipline at each event, each nation combines the points from up to two skaters/couples. The points each skater/couple earns is based on placement. Placement to point conversion is the same as for qualification, with first place earning 15 points, second earning 13 points, etc. In the event ties in the total scores, the country with the fewer skaters/couples (only counting skaters/couples from whom points were combined), wins the tie breaker. If the tie is not broken, the nations will have the same rank.

The final standings were:

Rank	Nation	Men	Ladies	Pairs	Ice dance	Total points
1	Russia	62	98	102	92	354
2	United States	66	48	35	92	241
3	Japan	46	90	0	0	136
4	Canada	33	0	35	51	119
5	Ukraine	23	4	26	3	56
6	South Korea	0	38	5	13	56
7	France	9	0	0	32	41
8	Latvia	26	7	0	0	33
9	Czech Republic	0	0	22	8	30
10	China	11	10	7	0	28

== JGP Final qualification standings ==
=== Qualification rules ===
At each event, skaters earn points toward qualification for the Junior Grand Prix Final. Following the 7th event, the top six highest scoring skaters advance to the Final. The points earned per placement are as follows:

Placement	Points (Singles/Dance)	Points (Pairs)
1st	15	15
2nd	13	13
3rd	11	11
4th	9	9
5th	7	7
6th	5	5
7th	4	4
8th	3	3
9th	2	–
10th	1	–

There are seven tie-breakers in cases of a tie in overall points:

1. Highest placement at an event. If a skater placed 1st and 3rd, the tiebreaker is the 1st place, and that beats a skater who placed 2nd in both events.
2. Highest combined total scores in both events. If a skater earned 200 points at one event and 250 at a second, that skater would win in the second tie-break over a skater who earned 200 points at one event and 150 at another.
3. Participated in two events.
4. Highest combined scores in the free skating/free dance portion of both events.
5. Highest individual score in the free skating/free dance portion from one event.
6. Highest combined scores in the short program/short dance of both events.
7. Highest number of total participants at the events.

If there is still a tie, it is considered unbreakable and the tied skaters all advance to the Junior Grand Prix Final.

=== Qualifiers ===
	Men	Ladies	Pairs	Ice dance
1	(United States) Nathan Chen	(Russia) Polina Tsurskaya	(Russia) Amina Atakhanova / Ilia Spiridonov	(United States) Lorraine McNamara / Quinn Carpenter
2	(Russia) Dmitri Aliev	(Russia) Maria Sotskova	(Ukraine) Renata Ohanesian / Mark Bardei	(United States) Rachel Parsons / Michael Parsons
3	(Japan) Sota Yamamoto	(Japan) Yuna Shiraiwa	(Russia) Ekaterina Borisova / Dmitry Sopot	(Russia) Alla Loboda / Pavel Drozd
4	(Canada) Roman Sadovsky	(Japan) Marin Honda	(Russia) Anastasia Gubanova / Alexei Sintsov	(Russia) Betina Popova / Yuri Vlasenko
5	(Israel) Daniel Samohin	(Japan) Mai Mihara	(Czech Republic) Anna Dušková / Martin Bidař	(France) Marie-Jade Lauriault / Romain Le Gac
6	(United States) Vincent Zhou	(Russia) Alisa Fedichkina	(Russia) Anastasia Poluianova / Stepan Korotkov	(Russia) Anastasia Skoptcova / Kirill Aleshin
Alternates
1st	(Latvia) Deniss Vasiļjevs	(Japan) Kaori Sakamoto	(Canada) Bryn Hoffman / Bryce Chudak	(France) Angélique Abachkina / Louis Thauron
2nd	(Russia) Alexander Samarin	(South Korea) Choi Da-bin	(United States) Joy Weinberg / Maximiliano Fernandez	(United States) Christina Carreira / Anthony Ponomarenko
3rd	(Canada) Nicolas Nadeau	(United States) Vivian Le	(Russia) Elena Ivanova / Tagir Khakimov	(Russia) Sofia Shevchenko / Igor Eremenko

== Top JGP scores ==
=== Men ===
Rank	Name	Nation	Score	Event
1	Nathan Chen	United States	236.76	2015 JGP USA
2	Sota Yamamoto	Japan	232.42	2015 JGP Poland
3	Daniel Samohin	Israel	227.19	2015 JGP Spain
4	Dmitri Aliev	Russia	225.94	2015 JGP Austria
5	Alexander Samarin	Russia	223.84	2015 JGP Croatia
6	Nicolas Nadeau	Canada	223.46	2015 JGP Croatia
7	Vincent Zhou	United States	211.96	2015 JGP Austria
8	Deniss Vasiļjevs	Latvia	207.83	2015 JGP Poland
9	Roman Sadovsky	Canada	203.72	2015 JGP Slovakia
10	Tomoki Hiwatashi	United States	197.62	2015 JGP Croatia

=== Ladies ===
Rank	Name	Nation	Score	Event
1	Polina Tsurskaya	Russia	195.28	2015–16 Junior Grand Prix Final
2	Yuna Shiraiwa	Japan	186.80	2015 JGP Spain
3	Alisa Fedichkina	Russia	186.38	2015 JGP Spain
4	Maria Sotskova	Russia	185.44	2015 JGP Austria
5	Mai Mihara	Japan	182.05	2015 JGP Austria
6	Marin Honda	Japan	181.22	2015 JGP Croatia
7	Yura Matsuda	Japan	178.98	2015 JGP Spain
8	Vivian Le	United States	176.30	2015 JGP Slovakia
9	Wakaba Higuchi	Japan	175.06	2015 JGP Croatia
10	Choi Da-bin	South Korea	172.38	2015 JGP Austria

=== Pairs ===
Rank	Name	Nation	Score	Event
1	Ekaterina Borisova / Dmitry Sopot	Russia	171.86	2015–16 Junior Grand Prix Final
2	Amina Atakhanova / Ilia Spiridonov	Russia	162.50	2015 JGP Austria
3	Anna Dušková / Martin Bidař	Czech Republic	162.33	2015–16 Junior Grand Prix Final
4	Anastasia Gubanova / Alexei Sintsov	Russia	157.09	2015–16 Junior Grand Prix Final
5	Renata Ohanesian / Mark Bardei	Ukraine	152.92	2015 JGP Austria
6	Anastasia Poluianova / Stepan Korotkov	Russia	145.27	2015–16 Junior Grand Prix Final
7	Bryn Hoffman / Bryce Chudak	Canada	142.33	2015 JGP Poland
8	Joy Weinberg / Maximiliano Fernandez	United States	136.62	2015 JGP USA
9	Chelsea Liu / Brian Johnson	United States	135.25	2015 JGP Poland
10	Justine Brasseur / Mathieu Ostiguy	Canada	135.11	2015 JGP Austria

=== Ice dance ===
Rank	Name	Nation	Score	Event
1	Lorraine McNamara / Quinn Carpenter	United States	162.63	2015 JGP Poland
2	Rachel Parsons / Michael Parsons	United States	160.79	2015 JGP Croatia
3	Alla Loboda / Pavel Drozd	Russia	153.64	2015 JGP Austria
4	Marie-Jade Lauriault / Romain Le Gac	France	152.72	2015 JGP Spain
5	Betina Popova / Yuri Vlasenko	Russia	150.94	2015 JGP Spain
6	Anastasia Skoptcova / Kirill Aleshin	Russia	148.75	2015 JGP Croatia
7	Christina Carreira / Anthony Ponomarenko	United States	146.15	2015 JGP Poland
8	Sofia Shevchenko / Igor Eremenko	Russia	143.87	2015 JGP Croatia
9	Angélique Abachkina / Louis Thauron	France	142.85	2015 JGP Croatia
10	Elliana Pogrebinsky / Alex Benoit	United States	142.85	2015 JGP Spain
