= Daniel Samohin =

Israeli figure skater

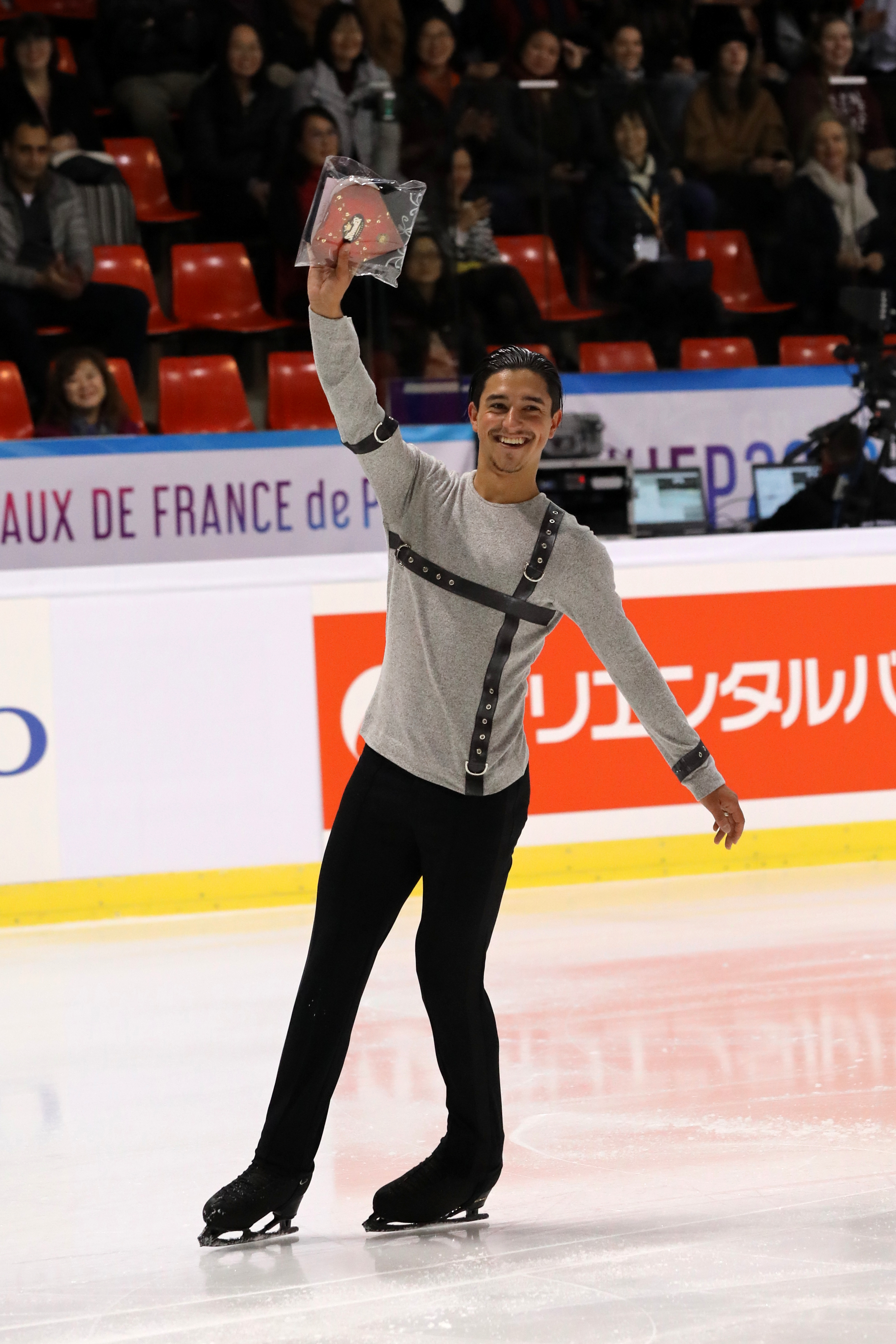
- Daniel Samohin at the 2019 Internationaux de France

Personal information
- Native name: דניאל סמוכין
- Born: March 12, 1998 (age 28) Tel Aviv, Israel
- Home town: San Diego, California, United States
- Height: 1.76 m (5 ft 9 in)

Figure skating career
- Country: United States (since 2023); Israel (2013–22)
- Discipline: Men's singles
- Coach: Igor Samohin
- Skating club: Ice Holon Israel
- Began skating: 2003
- Highest WS: 16th (2016–17)

Medal record
Representing Israel
Israeli Championships
Gold medal – first place	2015 Holon	Singles
Gold medal – first place	2019 Holon	Singles
Silver medal – second place	2016 Holon	Singles
Silver medal – second place	2017 Holon	Singles
Silver medal – second place	2020 Holon	Singles
Bronze medal – third place	2022 Holon	Singles
World Junior Championships
Gold medal – first place	2016 Debrecen	Singles

Daniel Samohin (Hebrew: דניאל סמוכין; born 12 March 1998) is an Israeli figure skater who currently competes for the US. He is the 2016 World Junior champion, and has won two ISU Challenger Series medals, including a gold medal at the 2015 U.S. International Classic. Samohin is one of the few skaters to have landed two quad jumps in a short program, three quads in a free program, and five quads in one competition. He was a member of the Israeli delegation to the 2018 Winter Olympics in Pyeongchang, South Korea.

== Personal life ==
Samohin was born on March 12, 1998, in Tel Aviv, Israel, is Jewish, and speaks two languages. His parents – Irina, a former rhythmic gymnast, and Igor Samohin, a former figure skater who had competed internationally in pairs for the Soviet Union and who as a figure skating coach coached Israel's national team for five years in the 1990s – had arrived in Israel from Russia in 1996. He has a grandfather who lives in Russia and a grandmother who lives in Israel. His brother, Stanislav, is 7 1/2 years older and competed in figure skating for both Russia and Israel. When he was 3 1/2 years old, Samohin moved with his mother to California in the United States, joining the rest of the family, who had moved earlier. His hometown is San Diego, California.

== Skating career ==
Samohin began skating in 2003. His club is Ice Holon Israel. His father is his coach, and his mother has worked as his choreographer, as have Olga Volozhinskaia and Nikolai Morozov.

=== 2013–14 season ===
Samohin made his international debut in September 2013 at an ISU Junior Grand Prix (JGP) event in Mexico. He ranked sixth in the short program, and placed third in the free skate and was awarded the bronze medal, outscoring Canada's Nam Nguyen by 1.85 points. He finished fourth at his second JGP assignment, in Ostrava, Czech Republic. In March 2014, he finished 12th at the 2014 World Junior Championships in Sofia, Bulgaria, having placed 17th in the short program and 10th in the free.

=== 2014–15 season ===
During the 2014 JGP series, Samohin placed 8th in Ljubljana, Slovenia and 16th in Zagreb, Croatia. In September 2014, he debuted on the senior international level, finishing 11th at the Nebelhorn Trophy, an ISU Challenger Series (CS) event. After placing fourth at another CS event, the Volvo Open Cup, he took silver at a regular senior international, the Tallinn Trophy, behind fellow Israeli Oleksii Bychenko. Ranked 12th in the short and 5th in the free, he finished 8th overall at the 2015 World Junior Championships in Tallinn, Estonia.

=== 2015–16 season ===
Samohin withdrew from a senior Grand Prix event, the 2015 Cup of China, in order to continue competing on the junior level. Competing in September at the Junior Grand Prix in Colorado Springs, Colorado, he placed 7th in the short and second in the free; he won the silver medal, finishing almost 30 points behind Nathan Chen of the United States and 3.49 ahead of Japan's Sota Yamamoto. Later that month, he won his first CS medal, outscoring Keiji Tanaka by 11.33 points to take gold at the U.S. International Classic.

After winning a silver medal at his second JGP event in Logroño, Spain, Samohin qualified for the JGP Final. His second CS medal, silver, came in October at the 2015 Mordovian Ornament, where he scored 1.24 points less than Maxim Kovtun. Samohin finished fifth at the JGP Final. His next event was the 2016 European Figure Skating Championships, where he set a new personal best in the short program and finished 7th overall.

In March, Samohin won a gold medal at the World Junior Championships in Debrecen, Hungary, winning the Single Skating Championship. He ranked 9th in the short program, but moved up to win the title after a personal-best free skate in which he landed three quadruple jumps. Samohin was the first Israeli skater to medal at Junior Worlds, and the first to win an ISU championship.

=== 2016–17 season ===
Samohin started his season off at the 2016 CS Autumn Classic International. He placed sixth overall. He then competed at the 2016 CS Finlandia Trophy where he finished thirteenth. Making his Grand Prix debut, Samohin placed 5th at the 2016 Skate Canada International and 8th at the 2016 Cup of China. In December, he won the silver medal behind Oleksii Bychenko at the 2016 CS Golden Spin of Zagreb, having ranked first in the short program and 7th in the free skate.

Samohin's luggage containing his skates was mislaid by the airline and did not arrive with him at the 2017 European Championships in Ostrava, Czech Republic, so he tried a borrowed new pair of skates four hours before the short program. He placed 33rd in the short, and did not advance to the free skate. His skates were found two and a half weeks later. He ranked 16th in the short program, second in the free skate, and sixth overall at the 2017 World Junior Championships in Taipei, Taiwan. He said that he was working on additional quads – loop, flip, and Lutz – but that they were not yet consistent for him.

In March 2017 he won the bronze medal at the Cup of Tyrol in Innsbruck, Austria. He also won a bronze medal in the ISU CS Minsk Arena Ice Star 2017, in Minsk, Belarus.

=== 2017–18 season ===
Samohin withdrew from the 2017 Skate America in November 2017, after dislocating his left shoulder when he fell on a quad Salchow.

He competed for Israel at the 2018 Winter Olympics in Men's Singles Figure Skating in Pyeongchang, South Korea, at the age of 19. He came in 13th, with 251.44 points, additionally setting a personal best score of 170.75 in the free skate.

He finished 20th at Worlds after scoring 20th in the short program and 18th in the free skate.

=== 2018–19 season ===
Samohin started his season off at the 2018 CS Ondrej Nepela Trophy. Placing 7th in the short program and 6th in the free skate, he placed 6th overall, He then competed at the 2018 CS Nebelhorn Trophy where he finished 6th. He withdrew from the 2018 CS Finlandia Trophy. In his Grand Prix events, he placed 8th at 2018 Skate Canada International and 10th at 2018 Internationaux de France.

=== 2019–20 season ===
Samohin began the season with a fifth-place finish at the 2019 CS Nebelhorn Trophy, before placing tenth at the 2019 Internationaux de France. Samohin withdrew from the 2019 Rostelecom Cup after placing eleventh in the short program, citing injury. He won the silver medal at the Israeli championships, concluding his season.

=== 2020–21 season ===
With the coronavirus pandemic leading to the ISU assigning Grand Prix events based primarily on training location, Samohin was assigned to the 2020 Skate America following the withdrawal of Stephen Gogolev. He placed twelfth of twelve skaters at the event.

=== 2021–22 season ===
Samohin began the international season with two minor events, a fifth-place finish at the Skating Club of Boston's Cranberry Cup before coming in seventh at the 2021 U.S. International Classic. On the Challenger series, he placed eighteenth at the 2021 CS Cup of Austria and twenty-third at the 2021 CS Golden Spin of Zagreb.

== Programs ==
Season	Short program	Free skating	Exhibition
2023–2024	L'immensità by Johnny Dorelli performed by Il Volo choreo. by Irina Samohina	Dawn of Faith by Eternal Eclipse choreo. by Irina Samohina	
2021–2022	L'immensità by Johnny Dorelli performed by Il Volo choreo. by Irina Samohina	Dawn of Faith by Eternal Eclipse choreo. by Irina Samohina	
2020–2021	Natural by Imagine Dragons	Sarajevo; Chase; Files; Train (from The Peacemaker) by Hans Zimmer	
2019–2020	Fastidious Horses (from White Night) by Vladimir Vysocki	Sarajevo; Chase; Files; Train (from The Peacemaker) by Hans Zimmer	
2018–2019	Senza Parole by Il Divo	Once Upon a Time in Mexico by Robert Rodriguez	
2017–2018	L'immensità by Johnny Dorelli performed by Il Volo; It's a Man's Man's Man's World performed by Seal	Two Angels by Sergei Erdenko, performed by Loyko	Tennessee Whiskey performed by Chris Stapleton
2016–2017	Delilah by Tom Jones	The Illusionist by Maxime Rodriguez	Crazy Santa
2015–2016	Still Loving You by The Scorpions choreo. by Irina Samohina	Sherlock Holmes by Hans Zimmer choreo. by Irina Samohina	
2014–2015	Still Loving You by The Scorpions choreo. by Irina Samohina	Once Upon a Time in Mexico by Robert Rodriguez choreo. by Irina Samohina	
2013–2014	Road of the Gypsies by Nikolai Erdenko choreo. by Irina Samohina	Hip Hop Tango by DJ choreo. by Irina Samohina	

== Competitive highlights ==
- GP – Event of the ISU Grand Prix Series
- JGP – Event of the ISU Junior Grand Prix Series
- CS – Event of the ISU Challenger Series
- WD – Withdrew from competition

=== Single skating (for the United States) ===
Competition placements at senior level
Season	2023–24
U.S. Championships	12th

=== Single skating (for Israel) ===
Competition placements at senior level
Season	2014–15	2015–16	2016–17	2017–18	2018–19	2019–20	2020–21	2021–22
Winter Olympics				13th				
World Championships				20th	24th			
European Championships	10th	7th	33rd	26th	13th			
Israeli Championships	1st	2nd	2nd		1st	2nd		3rd
GP Cup of China			8th					
GP Internationaux de France					10th	10th		
GP Rostelecom Cup				12th		WD		
GP Skate America				WD			12th	
GP Skate Canada			5th		8th			
CS Autumn Classic			6th					
CS Cup of Austria								18th
CS Finlandia Trophy			13th					
CS Golden Spin of Zagreb			2nd		4th	15th		23rd
CS Ice Star				3rd				
CS Mordovian Ornament		2nd						
CS Nebelhorn Trophy	11th				6th	5th		
CS Ondrej Nepela Trophy					6th			
CS Volvo Open Cup	4th							
CS U.S. Classic		1st		10th				7th
Challenge Cup						9th		
Cranberry Cup								5th
Cup of Tyrol			3rd					
Open Ice Mall Cup					1st			
Philadelphia Summer		1st						
Tallinn Trophy	2nd							

Competition placements at junior level
Season	2013–14	2014–15	2015–16	2016–17
World Junior Championships	12th	8th	1st	6th
Junior Grand Prix Final			5th	
JGP Croatia		16th		
JGP Czech Republic	4th			
JGP Mexico	3rd			
JGP Slovenia		8th		
JGP Spain			2nd	
JGP United States			2nd	
Bavarian Open	2nd			
Mentor Toruń Cup	1st			

== Detailed results ==
**2021–22 season**
Date	Event	SP	FS	Total
December 9–11, 2021	2021 CS Golden Spin of Zagreb	23; 56.85	18; 126.12	23; 182.97
November 11–14, 2021	2021 CS Cup of Austria	16; 66.33	20; 118.18	18; 184.51
September 14–17, 2021	2021 U.S. International Classic	7; 66.54	5; 140.82	7; 207.36
**2020–21 season**
Date	Event	SP	FS	Total
October 23–24, 2020	2020 Skate America	12; 61.60	12; 122.94	12; 184.54
**2019–20 season**
Date	Event	SP	FS	Total
February 20–23, 2020	2020 Challenge Cup	9; 66.54	6; 126.20	9; 192.74
December 4–7, 2019	2019 CS Golden Spin of Zagreb	11; 71.45	20; 115.90	15; 187.35
November 15–17, 2019	2019 Rostelecom Cup	11; 56.94	WD	–
November 1–3, 2019	2019 Internationaux de France	8; 70.84	10; 122.82	10; 193.66
September 25–28, 2019	2019 CS Nebelhorn Trophy	3; 69.52	5; 135.59	5; 205.11
**2018–19 season**
Date	Event	SP	FS	Total
March 18–24, 2019	2019 World Championships	15; 82.00	24; 123.28	24; 205.28
20–23 February 2019	2019 Open Ice Mall Cup	1; 91.32	2; 147.29	1; 238.61
21–27 January 2019	2019 European Championships	6; **86.48**	14; 130.69	13; 217.17
December 5–8, 2018	2018 CS Golden Spin of Zagreb	4; 85.10	6; 145.44	4; 230.54
November 23–25, 2018	2018 Internationaux de France	10; 72.33	9; 133.66	10; 205.99
October 26–28, 2018	2018 Skate Canada International	5; 84.90	9; 140.99	8; 225.89
September 26–29, 2018	2018 CS Nebelhorn Trophy	4; 71.60	6; 117.43	6; 189.04
19–22 September 2018	2018 CS Ondrej Nepela Trophy	7; 70.93	6; 126.87	6; 197.80
**2017–18 season**
Date	Event	SP	FS	Total
19–25 March 2018	2018 World Championships	20; 72.78	18; 141.23	20; 214.01
16–17 February 2018	2018 Winter Olympics	18; 80.69	11; **170.75**	13; **251.44**
15–21 January 2018	2018 European Championships	26; 59.18	–	26; 59.18
24–26 November 2017	2017 Skate America	5; 82.28	WD	–
26–29 October 2017	2017 CS Minsk-Arena Ice Star	6; 72.76	4; 146.99	3; 219.75
20–22 October 2017	2017 Rostelecom Cup	12; 62.02	12; 121.77	12; 183.79
13–17 September 2017	2017 CS U.S. International Classic	11; 64.74	9; 126.46	10; 191.20
2016–17 season
Date	Event	SP	FS	Total
25–29 January 2017	2017 European Championships	33; 50.33	–	33; 50.33
7–10 December 2016	2016 CS Golden Spin of Zagreb	1; 82.35	7; 143.77	2; 226.12
18–20 November 2016	2016 Cup of China	2; 83.47	10; 130.04	8; 213.51
28–30 October 2016	2016 Skate Canada	5; 74.62	7; 152.91	5; 226.53
6–10 October 2016	2016 CS Finlandia Trophy	14; 52.03	13; 108.94	13; 160.97
29 Sept. – 1 Oct. 2016	2016 CS Autumn Classic International	7; 60.81	7; 129.09	6; 189.90

=== Junior level ===
Small medals for short and free programs awarded only at ISU Championships. Previous ISU world best highlighted in bold.

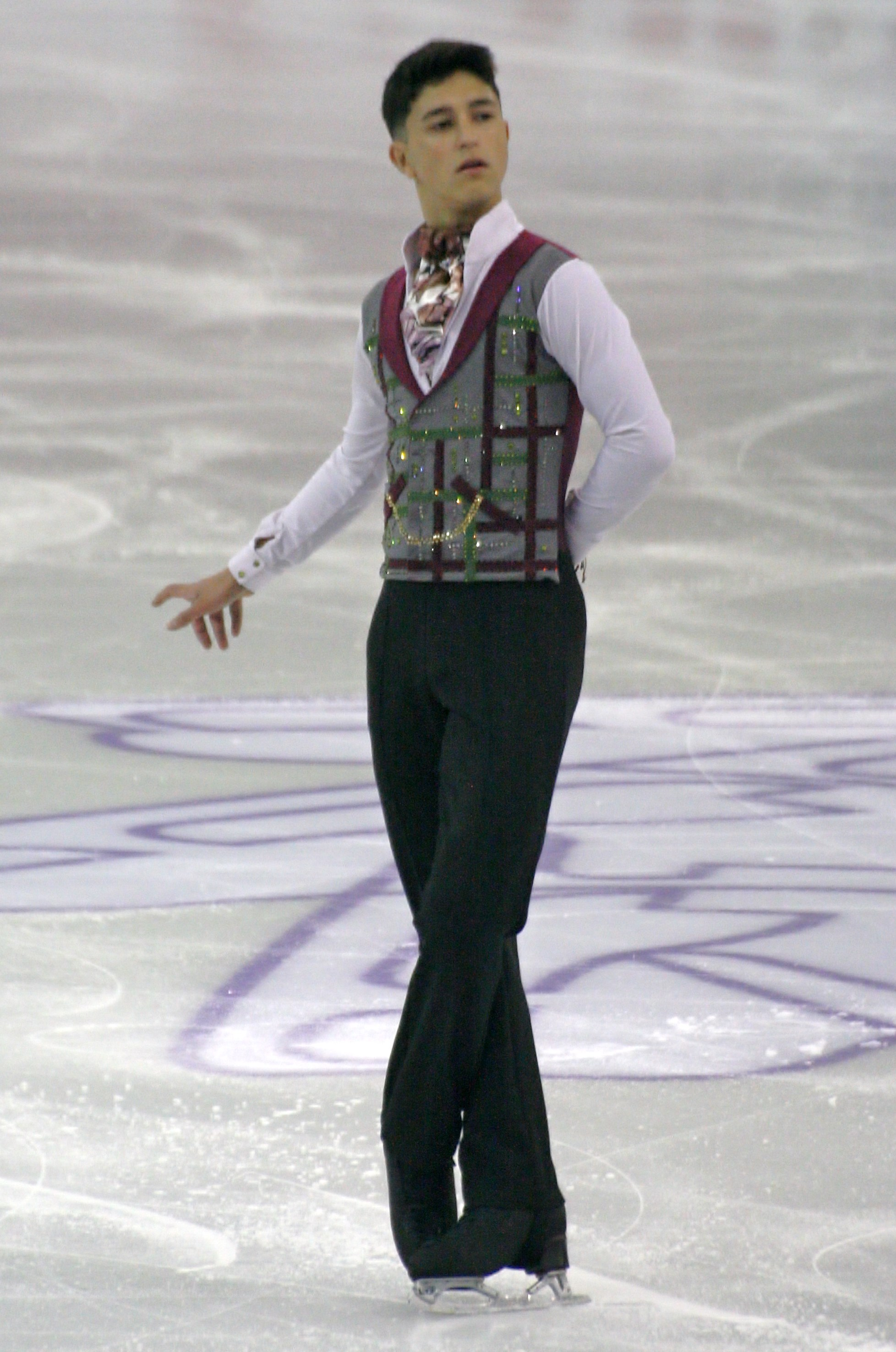
Samohin at the 2015–16 JGP Final

**2016–17 season**
Date	Event	Level	SP	FS	Total
15–19 March 2017	2017 World Junior Championships	Junior	16; 67.00	2; 165.63	6; 232.63
2015–16 season
Date	Event	Level	SP	FS	Total
14–20 March 2016	2016 World Junior Championships	Junior	9; 71.27	1; **165.38**	1; 236.65
26–31 January 2016	2016 European Championships	Senior	5; 82.73	8; 149.35	7; 232.08
9–13 December 2015	2015 JGP Final	Junior	5; 69.48	5; 115.20	5; 184.68
16–19 October 2015	2015 Mordovian Ornament	Senior	1; 79.66	2; 155.48	2; 235.14
30 Sept. – 3 Oct. 2015	2015 JGP Spain	Junior	2; 67.96	1; 159.23	2; 227.19
16–20 September 2015	2015 CS U.S. Classic	Senior	3; 71.52	2; 152.15	1; 223.67
2–5 September 2015	2015 JGP United States	Junior	7; 58.53	2; 148.64	2; 207.17
3–5 August 2017	2015 Philadelphia Summer International	Senior	3; 63.41	1; 125.36	1; 188.77
**2014–15 season**
Date	Event	Level	SP	FS	Total
2–8 March 2015	2015 World Junior Championships	Junior	12; 67.00	5; 135.39	8; 202.39
26 Jan. – 1 Feb. 2015	2015 European Championships	Senior	8; 72.65	9; 137.28	10; 209.93
3–7 December 2014	2014 Tallinn Trophy	Senior	2; 60.40	2; 124.54	2; 184.94
5–9 November 2014	2014 CS Volvo Open Cup	Senior	3; 61.91	4; 121.56	4; 183.47
9–10 October 2014	2014 JGP Croatia	Junior	16; 50.04	16; 95.88	16; 145.92
24–27 September 2014	2014 CS Nebelhorn Trophy	Senior	11; 49.67	14; 94.86	11; 144.53
**2013–14 season**
Date	Event	Level	SP	FS	Total
10–16 March 2014	2014 World Junior Championships	Junior	17; 58.84	10; 120.64	12; 179.48
29 January – February 2, 2014	2014 Bavarian Open	Junior	2; 60.09	2; 105.57	2; 165.66
8 January – January 11, 2014	2014 Toruń Cup	Junior	1; 65.24	1; 125.19	1; 190.43
2–5 October 2013	2013 JGP Czech Skate	Junior	9; 51.80	4; 117.18	4; 168.98
Sept. 4–8, 2013	2013 JGP Mexico	Junior	6; 59.36	3; 123.53	3; 182.89

- Personal best highlighted in **bold**.
