= 2015–16 Grand Prix of Figure Skating Final =

2015–16 Grand Prix Final
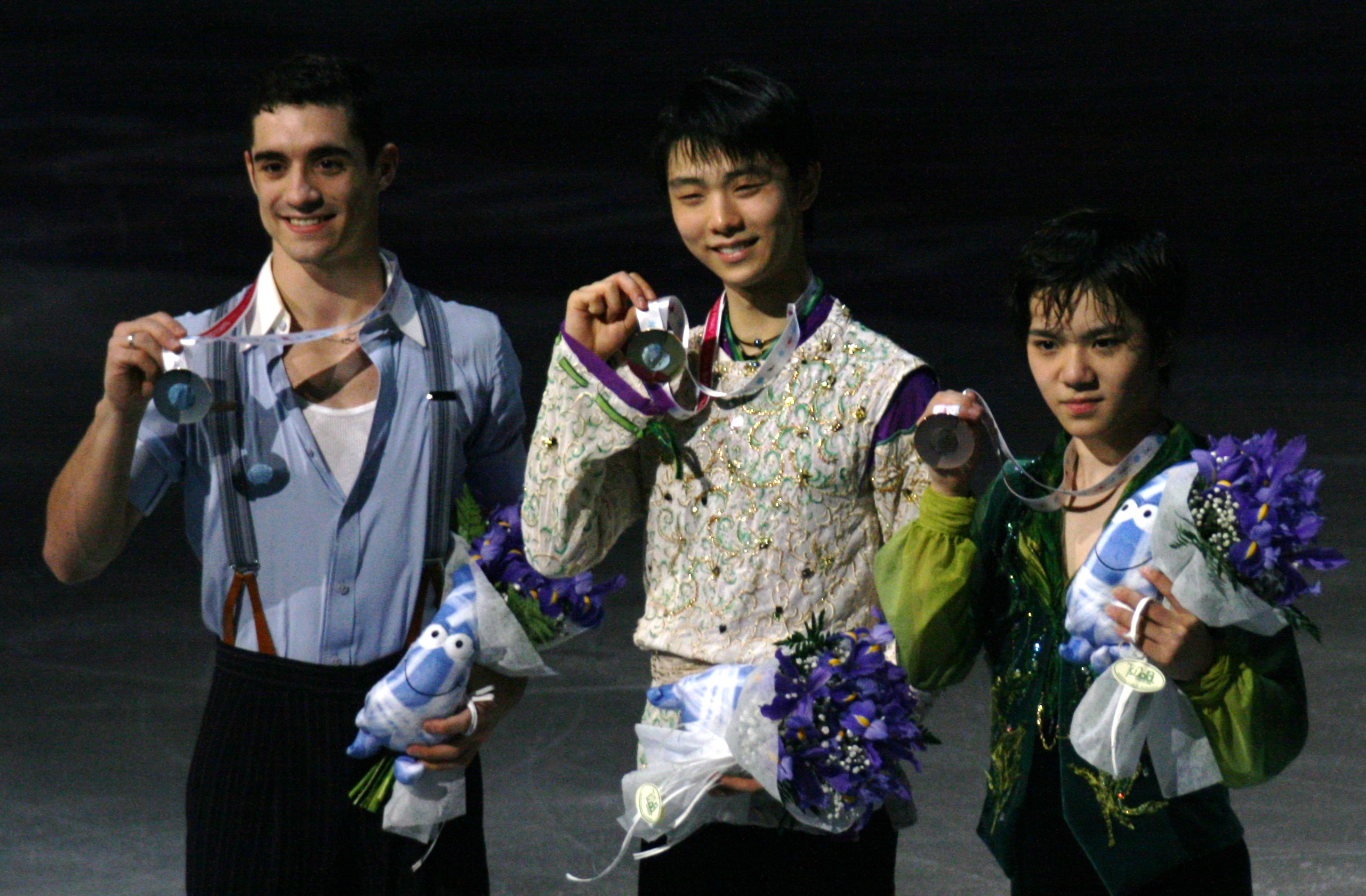
- Men's singles medal ceremonies
- Type: Grand Prix
- Date: December 10 – 13, 2015
- Season: 2015–16
- Location: Barcelona, Spain
- Host: Spanish Ice Sports Federation
- Venue: CCIB - Centre de Convencions Internacional de Barcelona

Champions
- Men's singles: (Japan) Yuzuru Hanyu (S) (United States) Nathan Chen (J)
- Ladies' singles: (Russia) Evgenia Medvedeva (S) (Russia) Polina Tsurskaya (J)
- Pairs: (Russia) Ksenia Stolbova / Fedor Klimov (S) (Russia) Ekaterina Borisova / Dmitry Sopot (J)
- Ice dance: (Canada) Kaitlyn Weaver / Andrew Poje (S) (United States) Lorraine McNamara / Quinn Carpenter (J)
- Previous: 2014–15 Grand Prix Final
- Next: 2016–17 Grand Prix Final
- Previous Grand Prix: 2015 NHK Trophy

The 2015–16 Grand Prix of Figure Skating Final and ISU Junior Grand Prix Final took place from December 10 to 13, 2015 in Barcelona, Spain. Hosted by Barcelona for the second year in a row, the combined event was the culmination of two international series — the Grand Prix of Figure Skating and the Junior Grand Prix. Medals were awarded in the disciplines of men's singles, women's singles, pair skating, and ice dancing on the senior and junior levels. For the first time, medals were also awarded in synchronized skating.

== Records ==
The following new highest senior and junior scores were set during this competition:

Event	Component	Skater(s)	Score	Date	Ref
Men	Short program	(Japan) Yuzuru Hanyu	110.95	10 December 2015	
Junior Ladies	Free skating	(Russia) Polina Tsurskaya	128.59	12 December 2015	
Junior Ladies	Total score	(Russia) Polina Tsurskaya	195.28	12 December 2015	
Men	Free skating	(Japan) Yuzuru Hanyu	219.48	12 December 2015	
Men	Total score	(Japan) Yuzuru Hanyu	330.43	12 December 2015	

== Schedule ==
(Local time):

Thursday, December 10

- 14:05 - Junior: Short dance
- 15:20 - Junior: Ladies short
- 16:25 - Junior: Pairs' short
- 17:40 - Junior: Men's short
- Opening ceremony
- 20:30 - Senior: Pairs' short
- 21:55 - Senior: Men's short

Friday, December 11

- 15:45 - Junior: Free dance
- 17:05 - Junior: Men's free
- 19:05 - Senior: Short dance
- 20:20 - Senior: Pairs' free
- 21:55 - Senior: Ladies short

Saturday, December 12

- 13:30 - Junior: Ladies free
- 14:45 - Junior: Pairs' free
- 16:10 - Synchronized skating: free
- 17:25 - Senior: Free dance
- 19:45 - Senior: Ladies free
- 21:00 - Senior: Men's free
- Awards ceremony

Sunday, December 13

- Gala exhibition

== Qualifiers ==
=== Senior-level qualifiers ===
Due to the cancellation of the free skating/dance at the 2015 Trophée Éric Bompard, the International Skating Union announced an exception to the qualification criteria – Bompard competitors who finished seventh in the qualifying standings would be invited to compete in the Grand Prix Final.

	Men	Ladies	Pairs	Ice dancing
1	(Spain) Javier Fernández	(United States) Gracie Gold	(Canada) Meagan Duhamel / Eric Radford	(Canada) Kaitlyn Weaver / Andrew Poje
2	(Japan) Yuzuru Hanyu	(Russia) Evgenia Medvedeva	(Russia) Yuko Kavaguti / Alexander Smirnov	(United States) Madison Chock / Evan Bates
3	(Japan) Shoma Uno	(Japan) Satoko Miyahara	(China) ~~Sui Wenjing / Han Cong~~ (withdrew)	(Italy) Anna Cappellini / Luca Lanotte
4	(China) Jin Boyang	(Japan) Mao Asada	(Russia) Ksenia Stolbova / Fedor Klimov	(United States) Maia Shibutani / Alex Shibutani
5	(Canada) Patrick Chan	(Russia) Elena Radionova	(United States) Alexa Scimeca / Chris Knierim	(United States) Madison Hubbell / Zachary Donohue
6	(Japan) Daisuke Murakami	(United States) Ashley Wagner	(China) Yu Xiaoyu / Jin Yang	(Russia) Ekaterina Bobrova / Dmitri Soloviev
7	—N/a	—N/a	(Canada) Julianne Séguin / Charlie Bilodeau	—N/a
Alternates
1st	(China) Yan Han	(Japan) Rika Hongo	(China) Peng Cheng / Zhang Hao (called up)	(Russia) Victoria Sinitsina / Nikita Katsalapov
2nd	(United States) Max Aaron	(Russia) Elizaveta Tuktamysheva	(France) Vanessa James / Morgan Ciprès	(Canada) Piper Gilles / Paul Poirier
3rd	(Russia) Adian Pitkeev	(United States) Courtney Hicks	—N/a	(Russia) Alexandra Stepanova / Ivan Bukin

=== Junior-level qualifiers ===
	Men	Ladies	Pairs	Ice dancing
1	(United States) Nathan Chen	(Russia) Polina Tsurskaya	(Russia) Amina Atakhanova / Ilia Spiridonov	(United States) Lorraine McNamara / Quinn Carpenter
2	(Russia) Dmitri Aliev	(Russia) Maria Sotskova	(Ukraine) Renata Ohanesian / Mark Bardei	(United States) Rachel Parsons / Michael Parsons
3	(Japan) Sota Yamamoto	(Japan) Yuna Shiraiwa	(Russia) Ekaterina Borisova / Dmitry Sopot	(Russia) Alla Loboda / Pavel Drozd
4	(Canada) Roman Sadovsky	(Japan) Marin Honda	(Russia) Anastasia Gubanova / Alexei Sintsov	(Russia) Betina Popova / Yuri Vlasenko
5	(Israel) Daniel Samohin	(Japan) Mai Mihara	(Czech Republic) Anna Dušková / Martin Bidař	(France) Marie-Jade Lauriault / Romain Le Gac
6	(United States) Vincent Zhou	(Russia) Alisa Fedichkina	(Russia) Anastasia Poluianova / Stepan Korotkov	(Russia) Anastasia Skoptsova / Kirill Aleshin
Alternates
1st	(Latvia) Deniss Vasiļjevs	(Japan) Kaori Sakamoto	(Canada) Bryn Hoffman / Bryce Chudak	(France) Angélique Abachkina / Louis Thauron
2nd	(Russia) Alexander Samarin	(South Korea) Choi Da-bin	(United States) Joy Weinberg / Maximiliano Fernandez	(United States) Christina Carreira / Anthony Ponomarenko
3rd	(Canada) Nicolas Nadeau	(United States) Vivian Le	(Russia) Elena Ivanova / Tagir Khakimov	(Russia) Sofia Shevchenko / Igor Eremenko

=== Synchronized skating ===
On 1 September 2015, the ISU announced that synchronized skating would make its debut at the Grand Prix Final. The top five countries would be allowed to send one team, with criteria used from placements at the 2015 World Synchronized Skating Championships. There would also be three substitutes. The following countries qualified:

- Canada
- Finland
- Russia
- Sweden
- United States

Substitutes:

- Germany
- Japan
- Italy

== Medalists ==
=== Senior ===
Discipline	Gold	Silver	Bronze
Men	(Japan) Yuzuru Hanyu	(Spain) Javier Fernández	(Japan) Shoma Uno
Ladies	(Russia) Evgenia Medvedeva	(Japan) Satoko Miyahara	(Russia) Elena Radionova
Pairs	(Russia) Ksenia Stolbova / Fedor Klimov	(Canada) Meagan Duhamel / Eric Radford	(Russia) Yuko Kavaguti / Alexander Smirnov
Ice dancing	(Canada) Kaitlyn Weaver / Andrew Poje	(United States) Madison Chock / Evan Bates	(Italy) Anna Cappellini / Luca Lanotte

=== Junior ===
Discipline	Gold	Silver	Bronze
Men	(United States) Nathan Chen	(Russia) Dmitri Aliev	(Japan) Sota Yamamoto
Ladies	(Russia) Polina Tsurskaya	(Russia) Maria Sotskova	(Japan) Marin Honda
Pairs	(Russia) Ekaterina Borisova / Dmitry Sopot	(Czech Republic) Anna Dušková / Martin Bidař	(Russia) Amina Atakhanova / Ilia Spiridonov
Ice dancing	(United States) Lorraine McNamara / Quinn Carpenter	(Russia) Alla Loboda / Pavel Drozd	(United States) Rachel Parsons / Michael Parsons

== Medals table ==
=== Senior ===
Rank	Nation	Gold	Silver	Bronze	Total
1	Russia (RUS)	2	0	2	4
2	Japan (JPN)	1	1	1	3
3	Canada (CAN)	1	1	0	2
4	Spain (ESP)	0	1	0	1
4	United States (USA)	0	1	0	1
6	Italy (ITA)	0	0	1	1
Totals (6 entries)		4	4	4	12

=== Junior ===
Rank	Nation	Gold	Silver	Bronze	Total
1	Russia (RUS)	2	3	1	6
2	United States (USA)	2	0	1	3
3	Czech Republic (CZE)	0	1	0	1
4	Japan (JPN)	0	0	2	2
Totals (4 entries)		4	4	4	12

== Senior-level results ==
=== Men ===
Yuzuru Hanyu set a new world record for the short program (110.95), for the free skating (219.48), and for the combined total (330.43).

Rank	Name	Nation	Total points	SP		FS	
1	Yuzuru Hanyu	Japan	330.43	1	110.95	1	219.48
2	Javier Fernández	Spain	292.95	2	91.52	2	201.43
3	Shoma Uno	Japan	276.79	4	86.47	4	190.32
4	Patrick Chan	Canada	263.45	6	70.61	3	192.84
5	Jin Boyang	China	263.45	3	86.95	5	176.50
6	Daisuke Murakami	Japan	235.49	5	83.47	6	152.02

=== Women ===
Rank	Name	Nation	Total points	SP		FS	
1	Evgenia Medvedeva	Russia	222.54	1	74.58	1	147.96
2	Satoko Miyahara	Japan	208.85	4	68.76	2	140.09
3	Elena Radionova	Russia	201.13	2	69.43	4	131.70
4	Ashley Wagner	United States	199.81	6	60.04	3	139.77
5	Gracie Gold	United States	194.79	5	66.52	5	128.27
6	Mao Asada	Japan	194.32	3	69.13	6	125.19

=== Pairs ===
Rank	Name	Nation	Total points	SP		FS	
1	Ksenia Stolbova / Fedor Klimov	Russia	229.44	1	74.84	1	154.60
2	Meagan Duhamel / Eric Radford	Canada	216.67	3	72.74	2	143.93
3	Yuko Kavaguti / Alexander Smirnov	Russia	206.59	2	73.64	3	132.95
4	Julianne Séguin / Charlie Bilodeau	Canada	200.98	4	71.16	4	129.82
5	Yu Xiaoyu / Jin Yang	China	186.67	5	68.63	5	118.24
6	Peng Cheng / Zhang Hao	China	183.04	7	65.60	6	117.44
7	Alexa Scimeca / Chris Knierim	United States	177.42	6	68.14	7	109.28

=== Ice dancing ===
Rank	Name	Nation	Total points	SD		FD	
1	Kaitlyn Weaver / Andrew Poje	Canada	182.66	1	72.75	1	109.91
2	Madison Chock / Evan Bates	United States	177.55	2	71.64	3	105.91
3	Anna Cappellini / Luca Lanotte	Italy	176.37	3	70.14	2	106.23
4	Maia Shibutani / Alex Shibutani	United States	174.92	4	69.11	4	105.81
5	Ekaterina Bobrova / Dmitri Soloviev	Russia	166.73	6	65.43	5	101.30
6	Madison Hubbell / Zachary Donohue	United States	163.20	5	66.21	6	96.99

=== Synchronized skating ===
Rank	Name	Nation	Total points	FS
1	Team Paradise	Russia	131.09	1
2	Team Rockettes	Finland	127.66	2
3	Team Nexxice	Canada	120.34	3
4	Team Surprise	Sweden	118.48	4
5	Team Haydenettes	United States	106.81	5

== Junior-level results ==
=== Men ===
Rank	Name	Nation	Total points	SP		FS	
1	Nathan Chen	United States	225.04	1	78.59	1	146.45
2	Dmitri Aliev	Russia	211.22	2	76.78	2	134.44
3	Sota Yamamoto	Japan	205.31	3	72.85	4	132.46
4	Vincent Zhou	United States	204.56	4	70.48	3	134.08
5	Daniel Samohin	Israel	184.68	5	69.48	5	115.20
6	Roman Sadovsky	Canada	168.40	6	59.37	6	109.03

=== Women ===
Polina Tsurskaya set a new junior world record for the free skating (128.59 points) and for the combined total (195.28 points).

Rank	Name	Nation	Total points	SP		FS	
1	Polina Tsurskaya	Russia	195.28	1	66.69	1	128.59
2	Maria Sotskova	Russia	184.01	4	62.64	2	121.37
3	Marin Honda	Japan	178.64	3	63.69	3	114.95
4	Alisa Fedichkina	Russia	178.11	2	64.17	4	113.94
5	Yuna Shiraiwa	Japan	173.82	5	60.68	5	113.14
6	Mai Mihara	Japan	166.25	6	56.01	6	110.24

=== Pairs ===
Rank	Name	Nation	Total points	SP		FS	
1	Ekaterina Borisova / Dmitry Sopot	Russia	171.86	1	60.29	1	111.57
2	Anna Dušková / Martin Bidař	Czech Republic	162.33	3	55.78	2	106.55
3	Amina Atakhanova / Ilia Spiridonov	Russia	162.00	2	58.58	3	103.42
4	Anastasia Gubanova / Alexei Sintsov	Russia	157.09	4	54.88	4	102.21
5	Renata Ohanesian / Mark Bardei	Ukraine	149.87	5	52.54	5	97.33
6	Anastasia Poluianova / Stepan Korotkov	Russia	145.27	6	45.89	6	99.38

=== Ice dancing ===
Rank	Name	Nation	Total points	SD		FD	
1	Lorraine McNamara / Quinn Carpenter	United States	158.26	1	65.90	1	92.36
2	Alla Loboda / Pavel Drozd	Russia	150.86	3	64.01	2	86.85
3	Rachel Parsons / Michael Parsons	United States	144.41	2	64.91	5	79.50
4	Betina Popova / Yuri Vlasenko	Russia	143.96	4	61.85	4	82.11
5	Marie-Jade Lauriault / Romain Le Gac	France	141.44	5	57.97	3	83.47
6	Anastasia Skoptsova / Kirill Aleshin	Russia	134.61	6	56.51	6	78.10
