= Anastasia Poluianova =

Russian pair skater

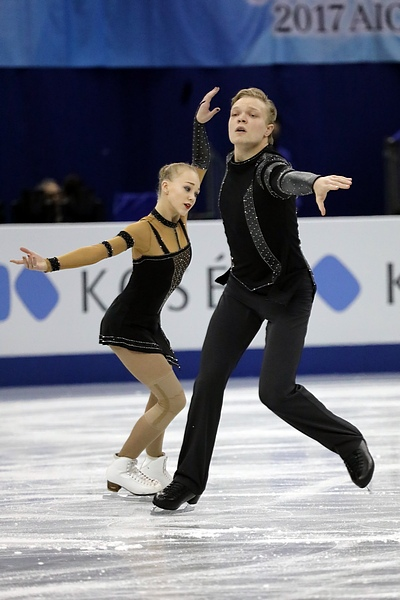
- Poluianova/Sopot in December 2017

Personal information
- Native name: Анастасия Артёмовна Полуянова
- Full name: Anastasia Artyomovna Poluianova
- Born: 10 July 2001 (age 25) Perm, Russia
- Home town: Perm, Russia
- Height: 1.62 m (5 ft 4 in)

Figure skating career
- Country: Russia
- Partner: Dmitry Sopot
- Coach: Pavel Sliusarenko, Valentina Tiukova
- Skating club: Perm Krai Sports Center
- Began skating: 2006
- Retired: August 22, 2019
Medal record
Figure skating: Pairs
Representing Russia
Winter Universiade
| Silver medal – second place | 2019 Krasnoyarsk | Pairs |

Anastasia Artyomovna Poluianova (Russian: Анастасия Артёмовна Полуянова, born 10 July 2001) is a Russian retired pair skater. With her skating partner, Dmitry Sopot, she is the 2017 CS Tallinn Trophy bronze medalist and has won two medals on the ISU Junior Grand Prix series. She qualified for the 2015–16 JGP Final with her previous partner, Stepan Korotkov.

== Career ==
Poluianova began learning to skate in 2006. She trained as a single skater in Perm.

=== Partnership with Korotkov ===
Poluianova and Stepan Korotkov began competing together in 2012. Coached by Valentina Tiukova and Pavel Sliusarenko at Perm Krai Sports Center in Perm, Poluianova/Korotkov made their international debut in late August 2015 at the Junior Grand Prix (JGP) competition in Riga. They were awarded the silver medal in Latvia and placed fourth at their second JGP assignment, in Linz, Austria. Their results qualified them for the 2015–16 JGP Final in Barcelona, where they finished sixth.

At Russian Nationals, Poluianova/Korotkov ranked tenth on the senior level and sixth at the junior event. They parted ways at the end of the season.

=== 2016–2017 season: Partnership with Selkin ===
Poluianova teamed up with Maksim Selkin in 2016. The two made their international debut in early September at the 2016–17 JGP event in Ostrava, Czech Republic, where they placed 4th.

At the 2017 Russian Championships, they placed 10th on the senior level and 11th at the junior event.

=== 2017–2018 season: Partnership with Sopot ===
Poluianova teamed up with Dmitry Sopot in 2017. They made their international debut at the 2017–18 JGP event in Minsk, Belarus where they placed 2nd behind teammates Daria Pavliuchenko / Denis Khodykin. They placed 3rd at their second JGP assignment, in Gdańsk, Poland. Their results qualified them for the 2017–18 JGP Final in Nagoya, Japan, where they placed 6th.

In November 2017 Poluianova/Sopot made their international senior debut at the 2017 CS Tallinn Trophy where they won the bronze medal.

At the 2018 Russian Championships, they placed 10th on the senior level and 8th at the junior event.

=== 2018–2019 season ===
Poluianova/Sopot started their season by competing in the 2018 JGP series. At their first JGP event of the season they won the silver medal in Linz, Austria. They were ranked 3rd in the short program and 2nd in the free skate and they were part of a Russian sweep of the pairs' podium. Poluianova/Sopot were more than 14 points behind the gold medalists, Polina Kostiukovich / Dmitrii Ialin but they beat the bronze medalists, Alina Pepeleva / Roman Pleshkov, by more than 7 points.

At their 2nd JGP event of the season they placed 4th in Ostrava, Czech Republic. With these results they qualified for the 2018–19 Junior Grand Prix Final where they finished 5th.

According to Tamara Moskvina, head coach of the Tamara Moskvina skating school where Anastasia and Dmitri trained, they have split up. He went on a cruise ship to skate in shows there. She apparently is not looking for a partner to continue her competitive career but plans to join the cruise ship once she is old enough.

== Programs ==
=== With Sopot ===
| Season | Short program | Free skating |
|---|---|---|
| 2018–2019 | Rain, In Your Black Eyes by Ezio Bosso | Adagio of Spartacus and Phrygia by Aram Khachaturian |
| 2017–2018 | Gabriel's Realm by Nathalie Manser | The Unforgiven Nothing Else Matters by Metallica |

=== With Selkin ===
| Season | Short program | Free skating |
|---|---|---|
| 2016–2017 | Lollipop (remix) by The Chordettes | Danse, mon Esmeralda (from Notre-Dame de Paris) by Riccardo Cocciante |

=== With Korotkov ===
| Season | Short program | Free skating |
|---|---|---|
| 2015–2016 | Booty Swing by Parov Stelar | Bohemian Rhapsody performed by Maksim Mrvica |
| 2014–2015 | Street Stomp; Papwalk performed by Ron Davis | Bohemian Rhapsody performed by Maksim Mrvica |
| 2013–2014 | unknown | Rain Blues by Raimonds Pauls |

== Competitive highlights ==
JGP: Junior Grand Prix

=== With Sopot ===
International
| Event | 2017–18 | 2018–19 |
|---|---|---|
| CS Tallinn Trophy | 3rd | |
| Universiade | | 2nd |
International: Junior
| JGP Final | 6th | 5th |
| JGP Austria | | 2nd |
| JGP Belarus | 2nd | |
| JGP Czech Republic | | 4th |
| JGP Poland | 3rd | |
National
| Russian Champ. | 10th | 12th |
| Russian Jr. Champ. | 8th | WD |
TBD = Assigned; WD = Withdrew

=== With Selkin ===
International
| Event | 2016–17 |
|---|---|
| JGP Czech Republic | 4th |
National
| Russian Champ. | 10th |
| Russian Junior Champ. | 11th |
TBD: Assigned

=== With Korotkov ===
International
| Event | 2013–14 | 2014–15 | 2015–16 |
|---|---|---|---|
| JGP Final | | | 6th |
| JGP Austria | | | 4th |
| JGP Latvia | | | 2nd |
National
| Russian Champ. | | | 10th |
| Russian Jr. Champ. | 10th | 6th | 6th |

== Detailed results ==
With Sopot

2018–19 season
| Date | Event | Level | SP | FS | Total |
| 7–9 March 2019 | 2019 Winter Universiade | Senior | 1; 58.92 | 2; 111.07 | 2; 169.99 |
| 19–23 December 2018 | 2019 Russian Championships | Senior | 11; 59.08 | 11; 113.81 | 12; 172.89 |
| 6–9 December 2018 | 2018–19 JGP Final | Junior | 5; 59.28 | 5; 99.05 | 5; 158.33 |
| 26–29 September 2018 | 2018 JGP Czech Republic | Junior | 3; 59.80 | 4; 95.81 | 4; 155.61 |
| 29 August – 1 September 2018 | 2018 JGP Austria | Junior | 3; 54.07 | 2; 112.04 | 2; 166.11 |
2017–18 season
| Date | Event | Level | SP | FS | Total |
| 23–26 January 2018 | 2018 Russian Junior Championships | Junior | 7; 58.42 | 9; 106.77 | 8; 165.19 |
| 21–24 December 2017 | 2018 Russian Championships | Senior | 10; 56.10 | 9; 118.02 | 10; 174.12 |
| 7–10 December 2017 | 2017–18 JGP Final | Junior | 5; 57.28 | 6; 103.19 | 6; 160.47 |
| 21–26 November 2017 | 2017 CS Tallinn Trophy | Senior | 4; 53.86 | 2; 107.74 | 3; 161.60 |
| 4–7 October 2017 | 2017 JGP Poland | Junior | 3; 56.81 | 3; 102.37 | 3; 159.18 |
| 20–24 September 2017 | 2017 JGP Belarus | Junior | 1; 56.37 | 2; 105.77 | 2; 162.14 |
