= Quinn Carpenter =

American ice dancer (born 1996)

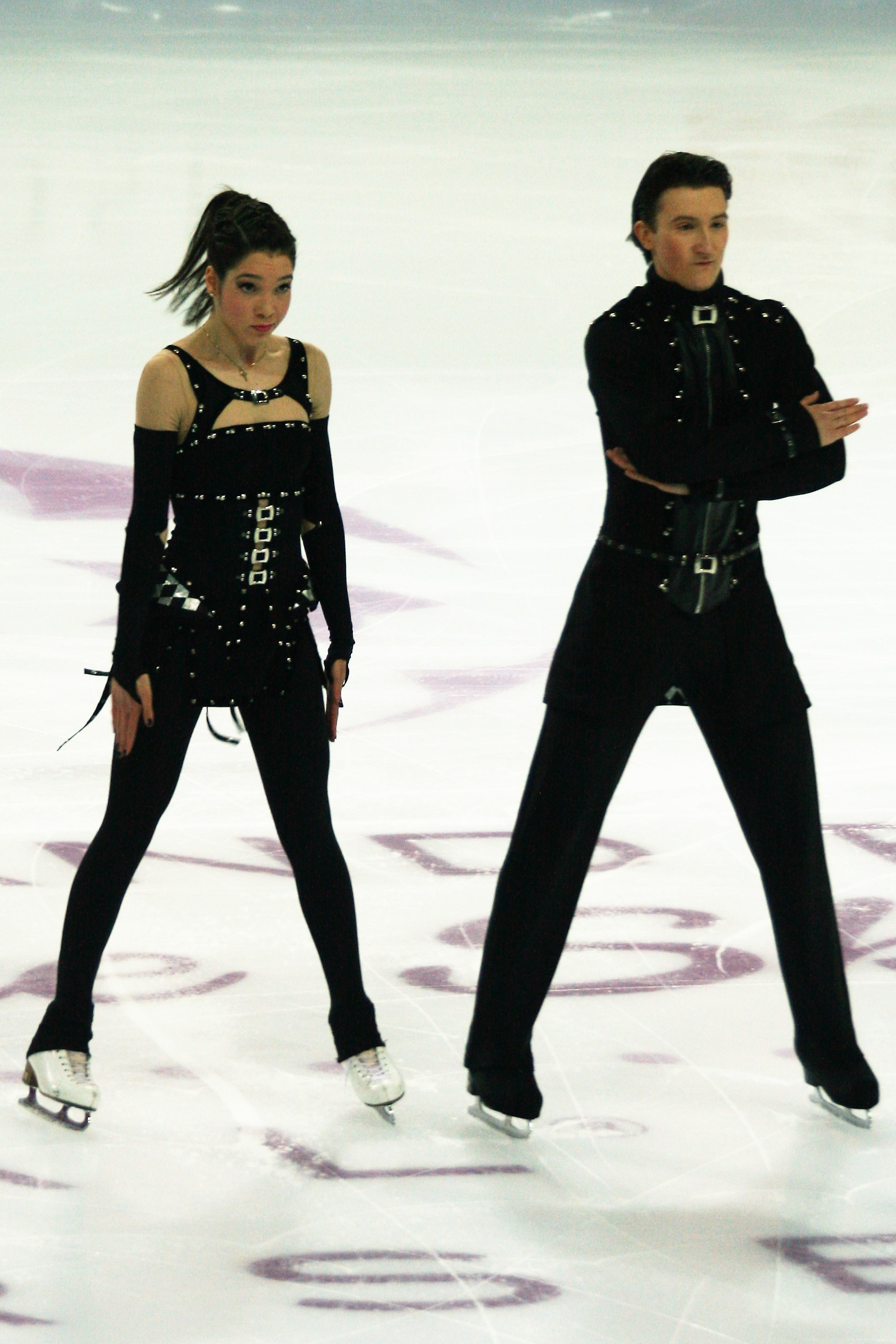
- McNamara and Carpenter at the 2016-17 JGP Final

Personal information
- Born: February 24, 1996 (age 30) Bethesda, Maryland, U.S.
- Home town: Wheaton, Maryland, U.S.
- Height: 5 ft 9 in (1.76 m)

Figure skating career
- Country: United States
- Discipline: Ice dance
- Began skating: 2000
- Retired: April 16, 2020
World Junior Championships
Gold medal – first place	2016 Debrecen	Ice dance
Silver medal – second place	2015 Tallinn	Ice dance
Junior Grand Prix Final
Gold medal – first place	2015–16 Barcelona	Ice dance
Bronze medal – third place	2013–14 Fukuoka	Ice dance
Bronze medal – third place	2016–17 Marseille	Ice dance

Quinn Carpenter (born February 24, 1996) is an American retired ice dancer. With his former skating partner, Lorraine McNamara, he is the 2018 Grand Prix of Helsinki bronze medalist, a three-time silver medalist on the ISU Challenger Series, and the 2019 U.S. national pewter medalist. Earlier in their career, they became the 2016 World Junior champions, the 2015 JGP Final champions, and two-time U.S. national junior champions.

== Personal life ==
Quinn Carpenter was born February 24, 1996, in Bethesda, Maryland. He was homeschooled before enrolling at Montgomery College in Rockville, Maryland, where he is studying mechanical engineering. He currently resides in North Bethesda, Maryland.

== Career ==
Carpenter's parents introduced him to ice skating when he was two or three years old. He joined Alexei Kiliakov and Elena Novak at the Wheaton Ice Dance Academy at age six. Carpenter skated one season with his first partner.

Carpenter began skating with Lorraine McNamara in 2005. They won the junior bronze medal at the 2012 U.S. Championships but McNamara was too young to be sent to the 2012 World Junior Championships.

=== 2012–2013 season ===
McNamara/Carpenter became age-eligible for junior internationals. In August 2012, they finished sixth in their Junior Grand Prix (JGP) debut, in Courchevel, France. They placed fourth the following month at their second JGP assignment, in Istanbul, Turkey. After winning the junior bronze medal at the U.S. Championships, McNamara/Carpenter were assigned to the World Junior Championships in Milan. They placed 8th in the short dance, 11th in the free dance, and 9th overall in Italy.

=== 2013–2014 season ===
McNamara/Carpenter won their first international medals during the 2013–14 JGP series, taking silver in Riga, Latvia and then gold in Minsk, Belarus. Their results qualified them to the JGP Final in Fukuoka, Japan, where they won the bronze medal. The duo won the junior silver medal at the 2014 U.S. Championships and finished fourth at the 2014 World Junior Championships in Sofia, Bulgaria, after placing third in the short dance and fifth in the free dance.

=== 2014–2015 season ===
In the 2014–15 JGP series, McNamara/Carpenter won bronze in Ostrava, Czech Republic and silver in Dresden, Germany, finishing as second alternates for the JGP Final. In January 2015, they won the junior titles at the Toruń Cup and then at the 2015 U.S. National Championships. In March, they were awarded the silver medal at the 2015 World Junior Championships in Tallinn, Estonia. Third in both segments, they finished second overall to Russia's Anna Yanovskaya / Sergey Mozgov by a margin of 9.09 points and ahead of Ukraine's Oleksandra Nazarova / Maxim Nikitin by 0.82.

=== 2015–2016 season ===
McNamara/Carpenter won gold at both of their 2015–16 JGP assignments, in Colorado Springs, Colorado, and Toruń, Poland. In December 2015, they were awarded gold at the 2015–16 JGP Final, outscoring silver medalists Alla Loboda / Pavel Drozd by over eight points. In January 2016, they won their second national junior title, finishing ahead of Rachel Parsons / Michael Parsons by 4.58 points. In March, they competed at the World Junior Championships in Debrecen, Hungary. Ranked second in the short dance and first in the free dance, McNamara/Carpenter won the gold medal by a margin of 0.91 over the Parsons.

=== 2016–2017 season ===
In their final season on the junior level, McNamara/Carpenter won gold in both of their 2016-17 JGP assignments in Ljubljana, Slovenia and Ostrava, Czech Republic. They went on to finish third at the 2016-17 Junior Grand Prix Final. They also finished third at the 2017 U.S. National Championships.

Competing in what would be their final Junior World Championships, they placed seventh in the short dance after receiving only a Level 1 on their step sequence. Carpenter had trouble with her twizzles in the free dance, placing them sixth in that segment, and remaining in seventh place overall.

=== 2017–2018 season ===
Making their senior international debut, McNamara/Carpenter won the Lake Placid Ice Dance International. Initially assigned to two Challenger series events, they placed fifth at the 2017 CS Autumn Classic International and eight at the 2017 CS Finlandia Trophy. They then made their Grand Prix debut, placing fifth at the 2017 Cup of China. Reflecting on the transition to the senior ranks, Carpenter remarked "we knew we didn't have anything to lose, so we threw out our very best. We will use the experience of getting here and build off of it." Following the Grand Prix they competed at a third Challenger, and won the silver medal at the 2017 CS Warsaw Cup.

Competing as seniors domestically, they placed sixth at the 2018 U.S. Championships. As the top three American teams were assigned to the Olympic team, McNamara/Carpenter were sent to the 2018 Four Continents Championships in Taipei. McNamara/Carpenter placed fourth in Taipei, of which McNamara said "I think it went exactly the way we wanted, two strong, clean skates. I think it’s a good debut for us."

=== 2018–2019 season ===
In their second senior season, McNamara/Carpenter began by repeating as champions at Lake Placid Ice Dance International. After winning the silver medal at their first Challenger, the 2018 CS Ondrej Nepela Trophy, they placed fourth at the 2018 Skate America, narrowly missing the podium behind Tiffany Zahorski / Jonathan Guerreiro after coming third in the free dance. At their second Grand Prix event of the season, they won the bronze medal at the 2018 Grand Prix of Helsinki despite two extended lift deductions in the free dance. McNamara called their first Grand Prix medal "something to be proud of." Afterward, they competed a second Challenger, the 2018 CS Inge Solar Memorial, where they again won the silver medal.

At their final event of the season, the 2018 U.S. Championships, McNamara/Carpenter placed fourth, earning the domestic pewter medal.

=== 2019–2020 season ===
Beginning the season again at the Lake Placid Ice Dance International, McNamara/Carpenter won the bronze medal. On the Challenger series, they won bronze at the 2019 CS Ondrej Nepela Memorial. Subsequently, an injury compelled them to withdraw from their first Grand Prix, the 2019 Internationaux de France. They were able to compete at their second Grand Prix, placing ninth at the 2019 NHK Trophy.

McNamara/Carpenter placed sixth at the 2020 U.S. Championships. This proved to be their final competitive appearance, as Carpenter announced his retirement from ice dance on April 16, 2020. McNamara said she would seek to continue skating with a new partner.

== Programs ==
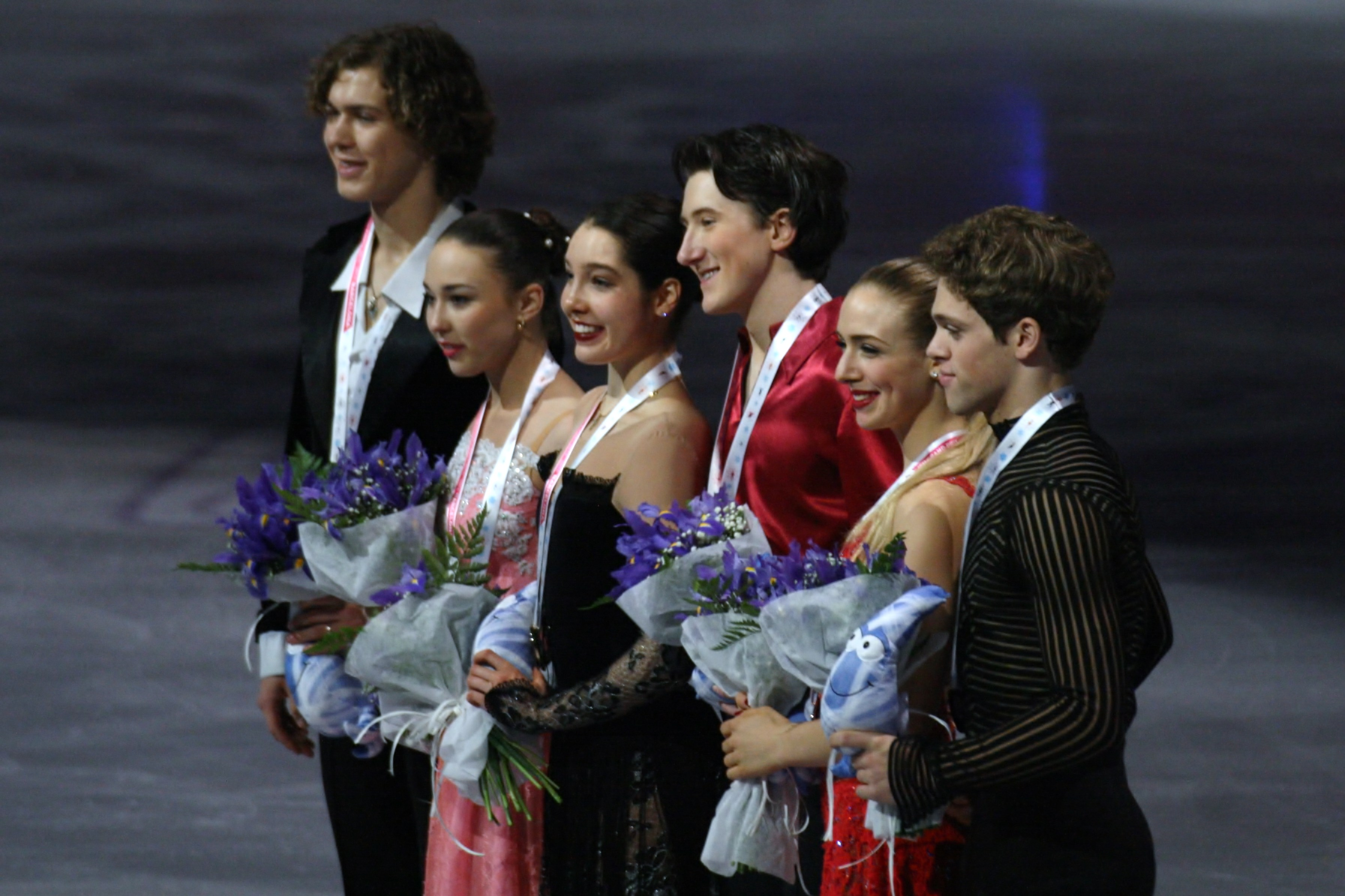
McNamara/Carpenter at the 2015-16 JGP Final podium

(with McNamara)

Season	Short dance	Free dance	Exhibition
2019–2020	Slow Foxtrot: It Was A Good Time (from Liza with a Z); Quickstep: Maybe This Time (from Cabaret) both performed by Liza Minnelli	Anime Contro Vendo by Medialuna Tango Project; Rescue by Lauren Daigle; No Boundaries by Adam Lambert	
2018–2019	Waltz: Desde el Alma; Tango: Quejumbroso by Orquesta Clor Tango de Roberto Alvarez	Porz Goret by Yann Tiersen; Mirror - Modern Piano by Piano; Penn Ar Roc'h by Yann Tiersen	
2017–2018	Rhumba: Mambo Italiano by Bob Merrill; Slow Rhumba: El Perdedor by Enrique Iglesias feat. Marco Antonio Solís; Samba: Big Bagz by Alex Romano	Anime Contro Vendo by Medialuna Tango Project	
2016–2017	Hip hop: Vanguardian by Steed Lord; Blues: The Power by District 78 feat. Cheesa; Hip hop: Gaia by Claude Challe, Jean-Marc Challe	Thunder Struck; Nothing Else Matters; Rock Prelude performed by David Garrett	Disco Inferno by The Trammps with Parsons/Parsons
2015–2016	Peer Gynt by Edvard Grieg; Anitra's Dance; In the Hall of the Mountain King choreo. by Elena Novak, Alexei Kiliakov	Carmen by Georges Bizet; Changing of the Guard; Dance; Second Intermezzo; Scene choreo. by Elena Novak, Alexei Kiliakov	I Want It That Way by the Backstreet Boys
2014–2015	Heart of Africa by Nature Lounge Club	The Phantom of the Opera by Andrew Lloyd Webber; The Phantom of the Opera; The Music of the Night; The Phantom of the Opera	Beneath Your Beautiful by Labrinth ft. Emeli Sandé; Get Smart by Trevor Rabin
2013–2014	Bublitchki; Chiribim Chiribom performed by The Barry Sisters	Discombobulate (from Sherlock Holmes) by Hans Zimmer; The Godfather Waltz by Nino Rota; Discombobulate	Beneath Your Beautiful by Labrinth ft. Emeli Sandé
2012–2013	Ramalama Bang Bang by Róisín Murphy; Zombie Blues by Flipron; Ramalama Bang Bang by Róisín Murphy	Roméo et Juliette, de la Haine à l'Amour by Gerard Presgurvic; Le Balcon; Les Rois Du Monde	
2011–2012	Kaboom by Ursula 1000; Gabriel's Oboe by Ennio Morricone	The Four Seasons by Antonio Vivaldi performed by TechnoClassica	
2010–2011	Waltz: Tango:	Smile by Charlie Chaplin	
2009–2010		Boléro by Maurice Ravel	
2008–2009		Doll program	
2007–2008		Nobody Does It Better (from The Spy Who Loved Me) by Marvin Hamlisch; Soul Bossa Nova by Quincy Jones	
2006–2007		The Addams Family; Selections by Duke Ellington	

== Competitive highlights ==
=== Ice dance with Lorraine McNamara ===
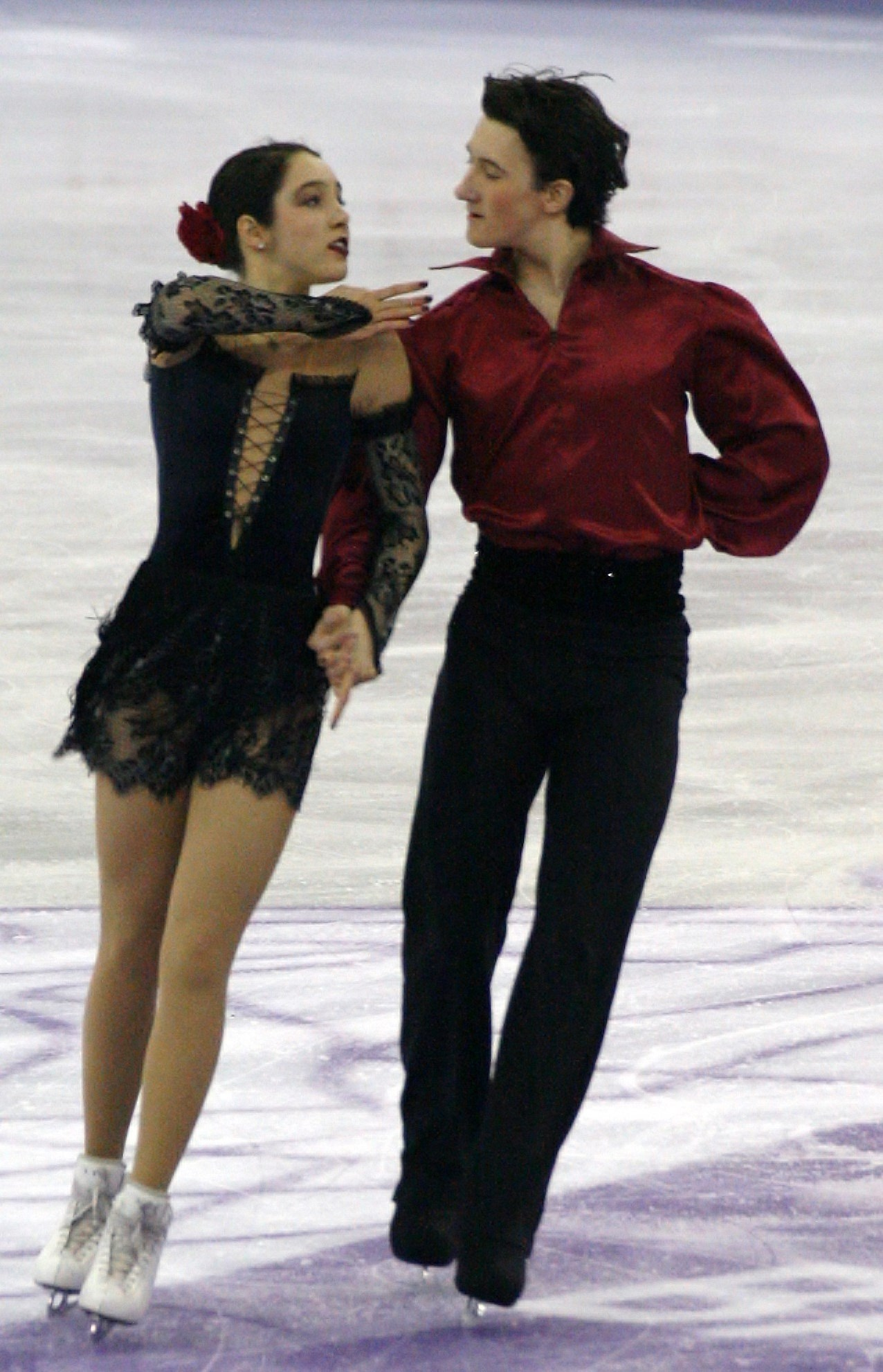
McNamara and Carpenter at the 2015−16 Junior Grand Prix Final

- GP – Event of the ISU Grand Prix Series
- JGP – Event of the ISU Junior Grand Prix Series
- CS – Event of the ISU Challenger Series

Competition placements at senior level
Season	2017–18	2018–19	2019–20
Four Continents Championships	4th		
GP Cup of China	5th		
GP Finland		3rd	
GP NHK Trophy			9th
GP Skate America		4th	
CS Alpen Trophy		2nd	
CS Autumn Classic	5th		
CS Finlandia Trophy	8th		
CS Golden Spin of Zagreb			4th
CS Nepela Memorial		2nd	3rd
CS Warsaw Cup	2nd		
Lake Placid Ice Dance	1st	1st	3rd
U.S. Championships	6th	4th	6th

Competition placements at junior level
Season	2010–11	2011–12	2012–13	2013–14	2014–15	2015–16	2016–17
World Junior Championships			9th	4th	2nd	1st	7th
JGP Final				3rd		1st	3rd
JGP Belarus				1st			
JGP Czech Republic					3rd		1st
JGP France			6th				
JGP Germany					2nd		
JGP Latvia				2nd			
JGP Poland						1st	
JGP Slovenia							1st
JGP Turkey			4th				
JGP United States						1st	
Toruń Cup					1st		
U.S. Championships	9th	3rd	3rd	2nd	1st	1st	3rd

== Detailed results ==
=== Ice dance with Lorraine McNamara ===
ISU personal best scores in the +5/-5 GOE System
Segment	Type	Score	Event
Total	TSS	183.47	2019 CS Nepela Memorial
Rhythm dance	TSS	78.39	2019 CS Golden Spin of Zagreb
Rhythm dance	TES	44.75	2019 CS Golden Spin of Zagreb
Rhythm dance	PCS	33.64	2019 CS Golden Spin of Zagreb
Free dance	TSS	109.87	2019 CS Nepela Memorial
Free dance	TES	60.09	2018 CS Ondrej Nepela Trophy
Free dance	PCS	50.04	2019 CS Nepela Memorial

ISU personal bests in the +3/-3 GOE System (from 2010–11)
Segment	Type	Score	Event
Total	TSS	163.65	2016 World Junior Championships
Short dance	TSS	66.60	2016 JGP Czech Republic
Short dance	TES	35.85	2015 JGP United States
Short dance	PCS	32.34	2016 JGP Czech Republic
Free dance	TSS	97.98	2017 CS Warsaw Cup
Free dance	TES	51.87	2018 Four Continents Championships
Free dance	PCS	49.81	2015 JGP Poland
