= 2017 Russian Figure Skating Championships =

- Type: National championship
- Date: 20–26 December 2016 (S); 1–5 February 2017 (J)
- Season: 2016–17
- Location: Chelyabinsk (S); Saint Petersburg (J)
- Host: Figure Skating Federation of Russia

Champions
- Men's singles: Mikhail Kolyada (S); Dmitri Aliev (J)
- Ladies' singles: Evgenia Medvedeva (S); Alina Zagitova (J)
- Pairs: Ksenia Stolbova / Fedor Klimov (S); Aleksandra Boikova / Dmitrii Kozlovskii (J)
- Ice dance: Ekaterina Bobrova / Dmitri Soloviev (S); Anastasia Shpilevaya / Grigory Smirnov (J)
- Previous: 2016 Russian Championships
- Next: 2018 Russian Championships

The 2017 Russian Figure Skating Championships (Russian: Чемпионат России по фигурному катанию на коньках 2017) were held from 20 to 26 December 2016 in Chelyabinsk, Chelyabinsk Oblast. Medals were awarded in the disciplines of men's singles, ladies' singles, pair skating, and ice dancing. The results were among the criteria used to select Russia's teams to the 2017 World Championships and 2017 European Championships.

== Competitions ==
In the 2016–17 season, Russian skaters will compete in domestic qualifying events and national championships for various age levels. The Russian Cup series will lead to three events – the Russian Championships, the Russian Junior Championships, and the Russian Cup Final.

Date	Event	Type	Location	Details
25–29 September 2016	1st stage of Russian Cup	Qualifier	Samara, Samara Oblast	Details
11–15 October 2016	2nd stage of Russian Cup	Qualifier	Yoshkar-Ola, Mari El	Details
25–29 October 2016	3rd stage of Russian Cup	Qualifier	Perm, Perm Krai	Details
7–11 November 2016	4th stage of Russian Cup	Qualifier	Kazan, Tatarstan	Details
2–6 December 2016	5th stage of Russian Cup	Qualifier	Moscow	Details
20–26 December 2016	2017 Russian Championships	Final	Chelyabinsk, Chelyabinsk Oblast	Details
1–5 February 2017	2017 Russian Junior Championships	Final	Saint Petersburg	Details
12–16 February 2017	2017 Russian Cup Final	Final	Saransk, Mordovia	Details
3–7 March 2017	2017 Russian Youth Championships – Younger Age	Final	Saransk, Mordovia	Details
1–4 April 2017	2017 Russian Youth Championships – Elder Age	Final	Veliky Novgorod, Novgorod Oblast	Details

== Medalists of most important competitions ==
Senior Championships
Discipline	Gold	Silver	Bronze
Men	Mikhail Kolyada	Alexander Samarin	Maxim Kovtun
Ladies	Evgenia Medvedeva	Alina Zagitova	Maria Sotskova
Pairs	Ksenia Stolbova / Fedor Klimov	Evgenia Tarasova / Vladimir Morozov	Natalia Zabiiako / Alexander Enbert
Ice dancing	Ekaterina Bobrova / Dmitri Soloviev	Alexandra Stepanova / Ivan Bukin	Victoria Sinitsina / Nikita Katsalapov
Junior Championships
Discipline	Gold	Silver	Bronze
Men	Dmitri Aliev	Alexander Petrov	Igor Efimchuk
Ladies	Alina Zagitova	Stanislava Konstantinova	Polina Tsurskaya
Pairs	Aleksandra Boikova / Dmitrii Kozlovskii	Amina Atakhanova / Ilia Spiridonov	Alina Ustimkina / Nikita Volodin
Ice dancing	Anastasia Shpilevaya / Grigory Smirnov	Alla Loboda / Pavel Drozd	Anastasia Skoptsova / Kirill Aleshin
Cup Final
Discipline	Gold	Silver	Bronze
Men	Alexander Samarin	Alexander Petrov	Sergei Voronov
Ladies	Polina Tsurskaya	Elizaveta Tuktamysheva	Valeria Mikhailova
Pairs	Kristina Astakhova / Alexei Rogonov	Alisa Efimova / Alexander Korovin	Anastasia Poluianova / Maksim Selkin
Ice dancing	Tiffany Zahorski / Jonathan Guerreiro	Betina Popova / Sergey Mozgov	Vasilisa Davankova / Anton Shibnev
Junior men	Makar Ignatov	Evgeni Semenenko	Ilia Skirda
Junior ladies	Anastasiia Gubanova	Viktoria Vasilieva	Alexandra Trusova
Junior pairs	Daria Kvartalova / Alexei Sviatchenko	Ekaterina Borisova / Dmitry Sopot	Nika Osipova / Aleksandr Galiamov
Junior ice dancing	Alla Loboda / Pavel Drozd	Sofia Polishchuk / Alexander Vakhnov	Elizaveta Khudaiberdieva / Nikita Nazarov
Youth Championships – Elder Age
Discipline	Gold	Silver	Bronze
Men	Egor Rukhin	Ilia Skirda	Egor Murashov
Ladies	Anastasia Tarakanova	Alexandra Trusova	Elizaveta Nugumanova
Pairs	Daria Pavliuchenko / Denis Khodykin	Kseniia Akhanteva / Valerii Kolesov	Lina Kudryavtseva / Alexander Simenenko
Ice dancing	Polina Ivanenko / Daniil Karpov	Arina Ushakova / Maxim Nekrasov	Elizaveta Shanaeva / Devid Naryzhnyy
Youth Championships – Younger Age
Discipline	Gold	Silver	Bronze
Men	Andrei Kutovoi	Egor Rukhin	Daniil Samsonov
Ladies	Anastasia Tarakanova	Anna Shcherbakova	Alexandra Trusova
Pairs	No pairs' discipline		
Ice dancing	No Ice dancing discipline		

== Senior Championships ==
The senior Championships will be held in Chelyabinsk from 20 to 26 December 2016. Competitors will qualify through international success or by competing in the Russian Cup series' senior-level events.

=== Entries ===
The Russian figure skating federation published the full list of entries on 13 December 2016.

Men	Ladies	Pairs	Ice dance
Mikhail Kolyada	Evgenia Medvedeva	Ksenia Stolbova / Fedor Klimov	Ekaterina Bobrova / Dmitri Soloviev
Maxim Kovtun	Anna Pogorilaya	Evgenia Tarasova / Vladimir Morozov	Alexandra Stepanova / Ivan Bukin
Sergei Voronov	Elena Radionova	Natalia Zabiiako / Alexander Enbert	Victoria Sinitsina / Nikita Katsalapov
Artur Dmitriev Jr.	Elizaveta Tuktamysheva	Yuko Kavaguti / Alexander Smirnov	Elena Ilinykh / Ruslan Zhiganshin
Alexander Petrov	Maria Sotskova	Kristina Astakhova / Alexei Rogonov	Tiffany Zahorski / Jonathan Guerreiro
Alexander Samarin	~~Yulia Lipnitskaya~~ (withdrew)	Alisa Efimova / Alexander Korovin	Sofia Evdokimova / Egor Bazin
~~Roman Savosin~~ (withdrew)	Alena Leonova	Anastasia Mishina / Vladislav Mirzoev	Vasilisa Davankova / Anton Shibnev
Ilia Skirda	Serafima Sakhanovich	Alina Ustimkina / Nikita Volodin	Maria Stavitskaia / Andrei Bagin
Dmitri Aliev	Alina Zagitova	Aleksandra Boikova / Dmitrii Kozlovskii	Ludmila Sosnitskaia / Pavel Golovishnikov
Anton Shulepov	Anastasiia Gubanova	Anastasia Poluianova / Maksim Selkin	Anastasia Safronova / Ilia Zimin
Andrei Lazukin	~~Elizaveta Nugumanova~~ (withdrew)	Bogdana Lukashevich / Alexander Stepanov	
Pavel Vyugov	Alisa Fedichkina	~~Maria Chuzhanova / Denis Mintsev~~ (withdrew)	
Alexey Erokhov	Stanislava Konstantinova		
Vladimir Samoilov	Valeria Mikhailova		
Murad Kurbanov	Alisa Lozko		
Artem Lezheev	Natalia Ogoreltseva		
Ilia Knyazhuk	Anastasia Kolomiets		
~~Evgeni Vlasov~~ (withdrew)	~~Anastasia Gracheva~~ (withdrew)		
Substitutes
Andrei Zuber (added)	Anastasia Yatsenko (added)	Elizaveta Zhuk / Egor Britkov (added)	Olga Bibikhina / Daniil Zvorykin
	Sofia Samodurova (added)		Betina Popova / Sergey Mozgov
	Ekaterina Guseva (added)		

=== Results ===
==== Men ====
Mikhail Kolyada won his first national title by a margin of 23 points over the silver medalist, Alexander Samarin. Moving up from 7th after the short program, former champion Maxim Kovtun took the bronze medal.

Rank	Name	Total points	SP		FS	
1	Mikhail Kolyada	283.48	1	95.33	1	188.15
2	Alexander Samarin	259.74	2	87.41	3	172.33
3	Maxim Kovtun	249.37	7	76.65	2	172.72
4	Andrei Lazukin	241.00	4	83.19	6	157.81
5	Dmitri Aliev	240.69	8	76.26	4	164.43
6	Alexander Petrov	236.93	9	75.97	5	160.96
7	Sergei Voronov	233.62	3	85.89	8	147.73
8	Artur Dmitriev Jr.	226.77	5	80.97	10	145.80
9	Anton Shulepov	224.03	6	78.11	9	145.92
10	Alexey Erokhov	216.80	13	64.20	7	152.60
11	Pavel Vyugov	206.82	10	71.51	11	135.31
12	Ilia Skirda	200.39	12	68.63	12	131.76
13	Artem Lezheev	195.25	11	69.18	15	126.07
14	Ilia Knyazhuk	189.47	15	60.12	13	129.35
15	Murad Kurbanov	189.38	14	62.83	14	126.55
16	Andrei Zuber	177.93	16	59.63	16	118.30
17	Vladimir Samoilov	160.42	17	46.97	17	113.45

==== Ladies ====
Medvedeva successfully defended her national title, outscoring Alina Zagitova by twelve points.

Rank	Name	Total points	SP		FS	
1	Evgenia Medvedeva	233.57	1	80.08	1	153.49
2	Alina Zagitova	221.21	3	74.26	2	146.95
3	Maria Sotskova	219.90	2	74.39	3	145.51
4	Anna Pogorilaya	215.62	4	73.45	4	142.17
5	Elena Radionova	209.24	5	70.19	5	139.05
6	Stanislava Konstantinova	200.19	7	68.34	7	131.85
7	Anastasiia Gubanova	197.26	10	63.34	6	133.92
8	Elizaveta Tuktamysheva	194.52	6	69.17	10	125.35
9	Sofia Samodurova	192.16	8	65.29	8	126.87
10	Alisa Fedichkina	189.57	9	63.96	9	125.61
11	Valeria Mikhailova	180.73	12	59.90	11	120.83
12	Serafima Sakhanovich	175.53	13	59.37	12	116.16
13	Alena Leonova	174.67	11	60.60	13	114.07
14	Alisa Lozko	170.93	14	58.40	14	112.53
15	Anastasia Yatsenko	164.61	16	55.74	15	108.87
16	Ekaterina Guseva	160.66	17	53.04	16	107.62
17	Natalia Ogoreltseva	159.69	15	57.48	17	102.21
18	Anastasia Kolomiets	137.93	18	44.24	18	93.69

==== Pairs ====
Returning to competition following an injury, Stolbova / Klimov won their third national title by a margin of less than a point over Tarasova / Morozov.

Rank	Name	Total points	SP		FS	
1	Ksenia Stolbova / Fedor Klimov	220.12	2	77.47	1	142.65
2	Evgenia Tarasova / Vladimir Morozov	219.19	1	80.04	2	139.15
3	Natalia Zabiiako / Alexander Enbert	201.91	3	72.85	3	129.06
4	Kristina Astakhova / Alexei Rogonov	198.79	4	70.73	4	128.06
5	Yuko Kavaguti / Alexander Smirnov	191.42	5	67.52	5	123.90
6	Aleksandra Boikova / Dmitrii Kozlovskii	179.01	8	60.77	6	118.24
7	Anastasia Mishina / Vladislav Mirzoev	178.26	7	62.80	7	115.46
8	Alisa Efimova / Alexander Korovin	176.60	6	63.69	8	112.91
9	Elizaveta Zhuk / Egor Britkov	161.24	9	57.64	9	103.60
10	Anastasia Poluianova / Maksim Selkin	154.98	12	52.25	10	102.73
11	Bogdana Lukashevich / Alexander Stepanov	146.88	11	52.88	11	94.00
WD	Alina Ustimkina / Nikita Volodin		10	55.35		

==== Ice dancing ====
Bobrova / Soloviev obtained their sixth national title. Stepanova / Bukin took the silver medal, with a deficit of 7.72 points, while Sinitsina/Katsalapov edged out Ilinykh / Zhiganshin by 0.17 for the bronze.

Rank	Name	Total points	SD		FD	
1	Ekaterina Bobrova / Dmitri Soloviev	197.26	1	81.40	1	115.86
2	Alexandra Stepanova / Ivan Bukin	189.54	2	76.47	2	113.07
3	Victoria Sinitsina / Nikita Katsalapov	178.45	3	73.78	4	104.67
4	Elena Ilinykh / Ruslan Zhiganshin	178.28	4	73.22	3	105.06
5	Tiffany Zahorski / Jonathan Guerreiro	169.46	5	69.01	5	100.45
6	Sofia Evdokimova / Egor Bazin	152.15	6	60.85	6	91.30
7	Vasilisa Davankova / Anton Shibnev	139.44	8	53.03	7	86.41
8	Maria Stavitskaia / Andrei Bagin	139.23	7	56.28	8	82.95
9	Ludmila Sosnitskaia / Pavel Golovishnikov	128.05	9	52.58	9	75.47
10	Anastasia Safronova / Ilia Zimin	112.22	10	45.18	10	67.04

== Junior Championships ==
The 2017 Russian Junior Championships (Russian: Первенство России среди юниоров 2017) will be held in Saint Petersburg from 1 to 5 February 2017. Competitors will qualify by competing in the Russian Cup series' junior-level events. The results of the Junior Championships are part of the selection criteria for the 2017 World Junior Championships.

=== Entries ===
The Russian figure skating federation published the full list of entries on 16 January 2017.

Men	Ladies	Pairs	Ice dance
Dmitri Aliev	Alina Zagitova	~~Anastasia Mishina / Vladislav Mirzoev~~ (withdrew)	Alla Loboda / Pavel Drozd
~~Alexander Samarin~~ (withdrew)	Anastasiia Gubanova	Aleksandra Boikova / Dmitrii Kozlovskii	Anastasia Shpilevaya / Grigory Smirnov
Roman Savosin	Polina Tsurskaya	Alina Ustimkina / Nikita Volodin	Anastasia Skoptsova / Kirill Aleshin
Alexander Petrov	Stanislava Konstantinova	Amina Atakhanova / Ilia Spiridonov	Sofia Polishchuk / Alexander Vakhnov
Ilia Skirda	Elizaveta Nugumanova	Ekaterina Borisova / Dmitry Sopot	Sofia Shevchenko / Igor Eremenko
Makar Ignatov	Alisa Fedichkina	Anastasia Poluianova / Maksim Selkin	Arina Ushakova / Maxim Nekrasov
Alexey Erokhov	~~Anna Shcherbakova~~ (withdrew)	Elizaveta Zhuk / Egor Britkov	Yana Buga / Georgiy Pokhilyuk
Petr Gumennik	Daria Panenkova	Daria Kvartalova / Alexei Sviatchenko	Ksenia Konkina / Grigory Yakushev
Artem Kovalev	Alexandra Trusova	Nika Osipova / Aleksandr Galiamov	Elizaveta Khudaiberdieva / Nikita Nazarov
Igor Efimchuk	Sofia Samodurova	Daria Pavliuchenko / Denis Khodykin	Evgeniia Lopareva / Alexey Karpushov
Egor Rukhin	Ekaterina Kurakova	Kseniia Akhanteva / Valerii Kolesov	Polina Ivanenko / Daniil Karpov
~~Artur Danielian~~ (withdrew)	~~Alisa Lozko~~ (withdrew)	Albina Sokur / Roman Pleshkov	Eva Kuts / Dmitrii Mikhailov
Egor Murashov	Anastasiia Guliakova		Daria Rumyantseva / Dmitry Ryabchenko
Evgeni Semenenko	Viktoria Vasilieva		Angelina Lazareva / Maxim Prokofiev
Mark Kondratiuk	Anastasia Tarakanova		Ekaterina Andreeva / Ivan Desyatov
Andrei Kutovoi	Anna Tarusina		
~~Andrei Sachkov~~ (withdrew)	Maria Talalaikina		
Artem Frolov	Ksenia Pankova		
Substitutes
Matvei Vetlugin (added)	Alena Kostornaia (added)	Elizaveta Martynova / Roman Zaporozhets (added)	Anastasia Ilianova / Dmitry Bovin
Kirill Yakovlev (added)	Ekaterina Mitrofanova (added)	Valeria Makarova / Dmitry Shulgin	Elizaveta Shanaeva / Devid Naryzhnyy
Mikhail Udalov (added)	Elena Pavlova	Polina Kostiukovich / Dmitrii Ialin	

=== Results ===
==== Men ====
Rank	Name	Total points	SP		FS	
1	Dmitri Aliev	247.82	1	86.23	1	161.59
2	Alexander Petrov	240.26	3	79.19	2	161.07
3	Igor Efimchuk	230.97	2	80.27	4	150.70
4	Makar Ignatov	230.54	5	77.55	3	152.99
5	Alexey Erokhov	224.49	6	75.23	5	149.26
6	Artem Frolov	215.43	7	73.07	7	142.36
7	Ilia Skirda	214.56	8	71.44	6	143.12
8	Roman Savosin	212.30	4	77.57	10	134.73
9	Petr Gumennik	204.12	11	68.13	8	135.99
10	Evgeni Semenenko	203.60	9	69.27	11	134.33
11	Egor Rukhin	202.72	12	67.83	9	134.89
12	Artem Kovalev	197.28	10	68.16	14	129.12
13	Matvei Vetlugin	197.16	13	67.65	13	129.51
14	Egor Murashov	196.63	16	65.11	12	131.52
15	Andrei Kutovoi	192.23	15	65.25	15	126.98
16	Mark Kondratiuk	189.27	14	66.75	16	122.52
17	Kirill Yakovlev	179.95	18	60.40	17	119.55
18	Mikhail Udalov	178.11	17	62.58	18	115.53

==== Ladies ====
Rank	Name	Total points	SP		FS	
1	Alina Zagitova	216.82	1	74.46	1	142.36
2	Stanislava Konstantinova	200.85	2	70.25	3	130.60
3	Polina Tsurskaya	200.08	5	65.79	2	134.29
4	Alexandra Trusova	194.60	6	64.95	4	129.65
5	Daria Panenkova	192.52	7	64.34	5	128.18
6	Alisa Fedichkina	186.33	3	69.87	11	116.46
7	Anastasiia Gubanova	185.79	11	62.18	6	123.61
8	Anastasiia Guliakova	182.00	4	66.13	12	115.87
9	Ekaterina Kurakova	180.79	8	64.11	10	116.68
10	Anna Tarusina	180.22	10	62.62	8	117.60
11	Elizaveta Nugumanova	178.83	13	55.72	7	123.11
12	Sofia Samodurova	176.70	9	63.24	13	113.46
13	Viktoria Vasilieva	171.47	14	54.53	9	116.94
14	Anastasia Tarakanova	165.38	16	53.29	14	112.09
15	Maria Talalaikina	163.36	15	53.38	15	109.98
16	Alena Kostornaia	161.25	12	57.77	16	103.48
17	Ksenia Pankova	153.07	18	50.15	17	102.92
18	Ekaterina Mitrofanova	151.33	17	51.82	18	99.51

==== Pairs ====
Rank	Name	Total points	SP		FS	
1	Aleksandra Boikova / Dmitrii Kozlovskii	181.58	2	64.95	1	116.63
2	Amina Atakhanova / Ilia Spiridonov	176.17	1	67.41	3	108.76
3	Alina Ustimkina / Nikita Volodin	172.56	5	61.73	2	110.83
4	Elizaveta Zhuk / Egor Britkov	170.12	6	61.60	4	108.52
5	Daria Pavliuchenko / Denis Khodykin	166.57	4	62.75	7	103.82
6	Daria Kvartalova / Alexei Sviatchenko	163.35	3	62.95	8	100.40
7	Albina Sokur / Roman Pleshkov	160.77	8	55.73	5	105.04
8	Ekaterina Borisova / Dmitry Sopot	157.89	11	53.02	6	104.87
9	Nika Osipova / Aleksandr Galiamov	154.58	7	55.86	9	98.72
10	Elizaveta Martynova / Roman Zaporozhets	151.01	10	54.24	10	96.77
11	Anastasia Poluianova / Maksim Selkin	147.87	9	54.55	11	93.32
WD	Kseniia Akhanteva / Valerii Kolesov					

==== Ice dancing ====
Rank	Name	Total points	SD		FD	
1	Anastasia Shpilevaya / Grigory Smirnov	163.88	2	67.71	1	96.17
2	Alla Loboda / Pavel Drozd	157.99	1	69.40	4	88.59
3	Anastasia Skoptsova / Kirill Aleshin	152.05	3	62.37	2	89.68
4	Sofia Polishchuk / Alexander Vakhnov	150.04	4	61.31	3	88.73
5	Ksenia Konkina / Grigory Yakushev	143.63	5	58.84	5	84.79
6	Sofia Shevchenko / Igor Eremenko	139.88	6	56.40	6	83.48
7	Arina Ushakova / Maxim Nekrasov	135.54	7	55.99	8	79.55
8	Elizaveta Khudaiberdieva / Nikita Nazarov	135.01	9	52.71	7	82.30
9	Evgeniia Lopareva / Alexey Karpushov	128.62	8	52.76	9	75.86
10	Eva Kuts / Dmitrii Mikhailov	125.74	10	50.83	10	74.91
11	Yana Buga / Georgiy Pokhilyuk	118.58	14	46.67	12	71.91
12	Polina Ivanenko / Daniil Karpov	117.90	12	47.90	13	70.00
13	Daria Rumyantseva / Dmitry Ryabchenko	116.23	15	42.52	11	73.71
14	Angelina Lazareva / Maxim Prokofiev	112.84	13	47.35	14	65.49
WD	Ekaterina Andreeva / Ivan Desyatov		11	50.06		

== International team selections ==
=== European Championships ===
Russia's team to the 2017 European Championships was published on 25 December 2016.

	Men	Ladies	Pairs	Ice dancing
1	Mikhail Kolyada	Evgenia Medvedeva	Ksenia Stolbova / Fedor Klimov	Ekaterina Bobrova / Dmitri Soloviev
2	Alexander Samarin	Maria Sotskova	Evgenia Tarasova / Vladimir Morozov	Alexandra Stepanova / Ivan Bukin
3	Maxim Kovtun	Anna Pogorilaya	Natalia Zabiiako / Alexander Enbert	Victoria Sinitsina / Nikita Katsalapov
1st alt.	Andrei Lazukin	Elena Radionova	Kristina Astakhova / Alexei Rogonov	Elena Ilinykh / Ruslan Zhiganshin
2nd alt.	Dmitri Aliev	Stanislava Konstantinova	Yuko Kavaguti / Alexander Smirnov	Tiffany Zahorski / Jonathan Guerreiro
3rd alt.	Alexander Petrov	Elizaveta Tuktamysheva	Anastasia Mishina / Vladislav Mirzoev	Sofia Evdokimova / Egor Bazin

=== Winter Universiade ===
Russia's team to the 2017 Winter Universiade was published on 25 December 2016.

Because the pairs' event had only two Russian entries, the pairs' event was cancelled.

	Men	Ladies	~~Pairs~~	Ice dancing
1	Andrei Lazukin	Elena Radionova	~~Alisa Efimova / Alexander Korovin~~	~~Elena Ilinykh / Ruslan Zhiganshin~~
2	Artur Dmitriev Jr.	Elizaveta Tuktamysheva	~~Bogdana Lukashevich / Alexander Stepanov~~	Sofia Evdokimova / Egor Bazin
3	Anton Shulepov	Alena Leonova		Vasilisa Davankova / Anton Shibnev
Alt.				Maria Stavitskaia / Andrei Bagin (added)

=== European Youth Olympic Winter Festival ===
Russia's team to the 2017 European Youth Olympic Winter Festival was published on 2 February 2017.

	Men	Ladies
1	Petr Gumennik	Alina Zagitova

=== World Junior Championships ===
Russia's team to the 2017 World Junior Championships was published on 5 February 2017.

	Men	Ladies	Pairs	Ice dancing
1	Dmitri Aliev	Alina Zagitova	Aleksandra Boikova / Dmitrii Kozlovskii	Anastasia Shpilevaya / Grigory Smirnov
2	Alexander Petrov	Stanislava Konstantinova	Amina Atakhanova / Ilia Spiridonov	Alla Loboda / Pavel Drozd
3	Alexander Samarin	Polina Tsurskaya	Alina Ustimkina / Nikita Volodin	Anastasia Skoptsova / Kirill Aleshin
Alt.	Igor Efimchuk	Daria Panenkova	Daria Kvartalova / Alexei Sviatchenko	Sofia Polishchuk / Alexander Vakhnov
Alt.	Alexey Erokhov	Alisa Fedichkina	Ekaterina Borisova / Dmitry Sopot	Ksenia Konkina / Grigory Yakushev
Alt.	Ilia Skirda	Anastasiia Gubanova	Anastasia Poluianova / Maksim Selkin	Sofia Shevchenko / Igor Eremenko

=== World Championships ===
Russia's team to the 2017 World Championships.

	Men	Ladies	Pairs	Ice dancing
1	Mikhail Kolyada	Evgenia Medvedeva	Ksenia Stolbova / Fedor Klimov	Ekaterina Bobrova / Dmitri Soloviev
2	Maxim Kovtun	Maria Sotskova	Evgenia Tarasova / Vladimir Morozov	Alexandra Stepanova / Ivan Bukin
3		Anna Pogorilaya	Natalia Zabiiako / Alexander Enbert	
1st alt.	Alexander Samarin	Elena Radionova	Kristina Astakhova / Alexei Rogonov	Victoria Sinitsina / Nikita Katsalapov
2nd alt.		Elizaveta Tuktamysheva		Elena Ilinykh / Ruslan Zhiganshin

=== World Team Trophy ===
Russia's team to the 2017 World Team Trophy.

	Men	Ladies	Pairs	Ice dancing
1	Mikhail Kolyada	Evgenia Medvedeva	Evgenia Tarasova / Vladimir Morozov	Ekaterina Bobrova / Dmitri Soloviev
2	Maxim Kovtun	Elena Radionova		
1st alt.	Alexander Samarin	Anna Pogorilaya	Natalia Zabiiako / Alexander Enbert	Alexandra Stepanova / Ivan Bukin
2nd alt.	Dmitri Aliev	Maria Sotskova		
