= 2018 Russian Figure Skating Championships =

- Type: National championship
- Date: 19–24 December 2017 (S); 23–26 January 2018 (J)
- Season: 2017–18
- Location: Saint Petersburg (S); Saransk (J)
- Host: Figure Skating Federation of Russia

Champions
- Men's singles: Mikhail Kolyada (S); Alexey Erokhov (J)
- Ladies' singles: Alina Zagitova (S); Alexandra Trusova (J)
- Pairs: Evgenia Tarasova / Vladimir Morozov (S); Daria Pavliuchenko / Denis Khodykin (J)
- Ice dance: Ekaterina Bobrova / Dmitri Soloviev (S); Anastasia Skoptsova / Kirill Aleshin (J)
- Previous: 2017 Russian Championships
- Next: 2019 Russian Championships

The 2018 Russian Figure Skating Championships (Russian: Чемпионат России по фигурному катанию на коньках 2018) were held from 19 to 24 December 2017 in Saint Petersburg. Medals were awarded in the disciplines of men's singles, ladies' singles, pair skating, and ice dance. The results were among the criteria used to select Russia's teams to the 2018 European Championships, 2018 Winter Olympics, and 2018 World Championships.

== Competitions ==
In the 2017–18 season, Russian skaters will compete in domestic qualifying events and national championships for various age levels. The Russian Cup series will lead to three events – the Russian Championships, the Russian Junior Championships, and the Russian Cup Final.

| Date | Event | Type | Location | Details |
|---|---|---|---|---|
| 15–19 September 2017 | 1st stage of Russian Cup | Qualifier | Syzran, Samara Oblast | Details |
| 12–16 October 2017 | 2nd stage of Russian Cup | Qualifier | Yoshkar-Ola, Mari El | Details |
| 27–31 October 2017 | 3rd stage of Russian Cup | Qualifier | Sochi, Krasnodar Krai | Details |
| 7–11 November 2017 | 4th stage of Russian Cup | Qualifier | Kazan, Tatarstan | Details |
| 21–25 November 2017 | 5th stage of Russian Cup | Qualifier | Moscow | Details |
| 19–24 December 2017 | 2018 Russian Championships | Final | Saint Petersburg | Details |
| 23–26 January 2018 | 2018 Russian Junior Championships | Final | Saransk, Mordovia | Details |
| 19–23 February 2018 | 2018 Russian Cup Final | Final | Veliky Novgorod, Novgorod Oblast | Details |
| 13–17 March 2018 | 2018 Russian Youth Championships – Younger Age | Final | Tyumen, Tyumen Oblast | Details |
| 2–5 April 2018 | 2018 Russian Youth Championships – Elder Age | Final | Kazan, Tatarstan | Details |

== Medalists of most important competitions ==
Senior Championships
| Discipline | Gold | Silver | Bronze |
|---|---|---|---|
| Men | Mikhail Kolyada | Alexander Samarin | Dmitri Aliev |
| Ladies | Alina Zagitova | Maria Sotskova | Alena Kostornaia |
| Pairs | Evgenia Tarasova / Vladimir Morozov | Ksenia Stolbova / Fedor Klimov | Natalia Zabiiako / Alexander Enbert |
| Ice dance | Ekaterina Bobrova / Dmitri Soloviev | Alexandra Stepanova / Ivan Bukin | Tiffany Zahorski / Jonathan Guerreiro |
Junior Championships
| Discipline | Gold | Silver | Bronze |
| Men | Alexey Erokhov | Roman Savosin | Artur Danielian |
| Ladies | Alexandra Trusova | Alena Kostornaia | Stanislava Konstantinova |
| Pairs | Daria Pavliuchenko / Denis Khodykin | Anastasia Mishina / Aleksandr Galiamov | Polina Kostiukovich / Dmitrii Ialin |
| Ice dance | Anastasia Skoptsova / Kirill Aleshin | Sofia Shevchenko / Igor Eremenko | Arina Ushakova / Maxim Nekrasov |
Cup Final
| Discipline | Gold | Silver | Bronze |
| Men | Anton Shulepov | Konstantin Milyukov | Vladimir Samoilov |
| Ladies | Alena Kostornaia | Anastasiia Gubanova | Daria Panenkova |
| Pairs | Alisa Efimova / Alexander Korovin | Sofia Buzaeva / Elisey Ivanov | Daria Kvartalova / Alexei Sviatchenko |
| Ice dance | Annabelle Morozov / Andrei Bagin | Olga Bibikhina / Daniil Zvorykin | Anastasia Safronova / Ilia Zimin |
| Junior men | Alexey Erokhov | Artur Danielian | Petr Gumennik |
| Junior ladies | Anna Shcherbakova | Alexandra Trusova | Kseniia Sinitsyna |
| Junior pairs | Anastasia Mishina / Aleksandr Galiamov | Anastasia Poluianova / Dmitry Sopot | Apollinariia Panfilova / Dmitry Rylov |
| Junior ice dance | Ksenia Konkina / Grigory Yakushev | Elizaveta Shanaeva / Devid Naryzhnyy | Angelina Lazareva / Maxim Prokofiev |
Youth Championships – Elder Age
| Discipline | Gold | Silver | Bronze |
| Men | Daniil Samsonov | Petr Gumennik | Egor Rukhin |
| Ladies | Anna Tarusina | Kseniia Sinitsyna | Alena Kanysheva |
| Pairs | Amina Atakhanova / Nikita Volodin | Kseniia Akhanteva / Valerii Kolesov | Apollinariia Panfilova / Dmitry Rylov |
| Ice dance | Polina Ivanenko / Daniil Karpov | Elizaveta Shanaeva / Devid Naryzhnyy | Sofya Tyutyunina / Alexander Shustitskiy |
Youth Championships – Younger Age
| Discipline | Gold | Silver | Bronze |
| Men | Daniil Samsonov | Andrei Kutovoi | Mikhail Polyanskiy |
| Ladies | Alena Kanysheva | Sofia Moroz | Anna Frolova |
| Pairs | No pairs' discipline | | |
| Ice dance | No Ice dance discipline | | |

== Senior Championships ==
The senior Championships were held in Saint Petersburg from 19 to 24 December 2017. Competitors qualified through international success or by competing in the Russian Cup series' senior-level events.

=== Entries ===
The Russian figure skating federation published the full list of entries on 15 December 2017.

| Men | Ladies | Pairs | Ice dance |
|---|---|---|---|
| Mikhail Kolyada | ~~Evgenia Medvedeva~~ (withdrew) | Ksenia Stolbova / Fedor Klimov | Ekaterina Bobrova / Dmitri Soloviev |
| Sergei Voronov | Alina Zagitova | Evgenia Tarasova / Vladimir Morozov | Alexandra Stepanova / Ivan Bukin |
| Alexander Samarin | Maria Sotskova | Natalia Zabiiako / Alexander Enbert | Victoria Sinitsina / Nikita Katsalapov |
| Artur Dmitriev Jr. | Polina Tsurskaya | Apollinariia Panfilova / Dmitry Rylov | Tiffany Zahorski / Jonathan Guerreiro |
| Dmitri Aliev | Elena Radionova | Kristina Astakhova / Alexei Rogonov | Betina Popova / Sergey Mozgov |
| Maxim Kovtun | Elizaveta Tuktamysheva | Alisa Efimova / Alexander Korovin | Alla Loboda / Pavel Drozd |
| Roman Savosin | Serafima Sakhanovich | Anastasia Mishina / Aleksandr Galiamov | Sofia Evdokimova / Egor Bazin |
| Alexander Petrov | Stanislava Konstantinova | Daria Pavliuchenko / Denis Khodykin | Annabelle Morozov / Andrei Bagin |
| Alexey Erokhov | Alena Leonova | Aleksandra Boikova / Dmitrii Kozlovskii | Ludmila Sosnitskaia / Pavel Golovishnikov |
| Anton Shulepov | Alena Kostornaia | Anastasia Poluianova / Dmitry Sopot | Anastasia Safronova / Ilia Zimin |
| Andrei Lazukin | Anastasiia Gubanova | Bogdana Lukashevich / Alexander Stepanov | Vlada Solovieva / Yuri Vlasenko |
| Makar Ignatov | Daria Panenkova | Tatiana Lyirova / Maksim Selkin | Ekaterina Luchina / Mikhail Bragin |
| Andrei Zuber | ~~Alisa Fedichkina~~ (withdrew) | | Margarita Shestakova / Saveliy Ugryumov |
| Vladimir Samoilov | Valeria Mikhailova | | |
| Murad Kurbanov | Sofia Samodurova | | |
| Artem Lezheev | Anastasiia Guliakova | | |
| Egor Murashov | Anna Tarusina | | |
| Konstantin Milyukov | Lidia Yakovleva | | |
Substitutes
| | Sofia Istomina (added) | | |
| | Anastasia Gracheva (added) | | |

=== Results ===
==== Men ====
| Rank | Name | Total points | SP | | FS | |
|---|---|---|---|---|---|---|
| 1 | Mikhail Kolyada | 281.16 | 2 | 101.62 | 1 | 179.54 |
| 2 | Alexander Samarin | 258.53 | 1 | 103.11 | 4 | 155.42 |
| 3 | Dmitri Aliev | 249.11 | 3 | 91.95 | 2 | 157.16 |
| 4 | Sergei Voronov | 245.88 | 4 | 90.23 | 3 | 155.65 |
| 5 | Artur Dmitriev Jr. | 238.51 | 7 | 83.66 | 5 | 154.85 |
| 6 | Vladimir Samoilov | 231.20 | 6 | 85.10 | 8 | 146.10 |
| 7 | Andrei Lazukin | 230.94 | 5 | 85.47 | 9 | 145.47 |
| 8 | Alexey Erokhov | 230.59 | 8 | 80.38 | 7 | 150.21 |
| 9 | Anton Shulepov | 221.13 | 13 | 69.99 | 6 | 151.14 |
| 10 | Roman Savosin | 218.61 | 9 | 77.79 | 12 | 140.82 |
| 11 | Artem Lezheev | 218.09 | 10 | 77.18 | 11 | 140.91 |
| 12 | Makar Ignatov | 217.25 | 11 | 75.81 | 10 | 141.44 |
| 13 | Konstantin Milyukov | 208.52 | 12 | 70.13 | 13 | 138.39 |
| 14 | Egor Murashov | 197.45 | 14 | 69.27 | 14 | 128.18 |
| 15 | Murad Kurbanov | 189.02 | 17 | 61.41 | 15 | 127.61 |
| 16 | Andrei Zuber | 177.59 | 18 | 50.34 | 16 | 127.25 |
| WD | Alexander Petrov | | 15 | 65.08 | | |
| WD | Maxim Kovtun | | 16 | 64.72 | | |

==== Ladies ====
| Rank | Name | Total points | SP | | FS | |
|---|---|---|---|---|---|---|
| 1 | Alina Zagitova | 233.59 | 1 | 78.15 | 1 | 155.44 |
| 2 | Maria Sotskova | 221.76 | 2 | 76.39 | 2 | 145.37 |
| 3 | Alena Kostornaia | 216.57 | 4 | 73.59 | 4 | 142.98 |
| 4 | Stanislava Konstantinova | 211.28 | 10 | 66.51 | 3 | 144.77 |
| 5 | Polina Tsurskaya | 207.61 | 3 | 75.33 | 6 | 132.28 |
| 6 | Anastasiia Gubanova | 206.60 | 5 | 71.69 | 5 | 134.91 |
| 7 | Elizaveta Tuktamysheva | 202.06 | 6 | 71.07 | 8 | 130.99 |
| 8 | Daria Panenkova | 201.97 | 7 | 69.83 | 7 | 132.14 |
| 9 | Serafima Sakhanovich | 197.44 | 8 | 67.58 | 10 | 129.86 |
| 10 | Elena Radionova | 196.78 | 13 | 66.16 | 9 | 130.62 |
| 11 | Sofia Samodurova | 196.51 | 9 | 67.07 | 11 | 129.44 |
| 12 | Anna Tarusina | 195.59 | 11 | 66.46 | 12 | 129.13 |
| 13 | Anastasiia Guliakova | 187.87 | 12 | 66.35 | 14 | 121.52 |
| 14 | Valeria Mikhailova | 186.51 | 14 | 63.79 | 13 | 122.72 |
| 15 | Alena Leonova | 176.72 | 16 | 62.15 | 15 | 114.57 |
| 16 | Sofia Istomina | 174.05 | 17 | 62.09 | 16 | 111.96 |
| 17 | Anastasia Gracheva | 167.30 | 15 | 62.17 | 18 | 105.13 |
| 18 | Lidia Yakoleva | 160.78 | 18 | 52.43 | 17 | 108.35 |
| WD | Evgenia Medvedeva | | | | | |
| WD | Alisa Fedichkina | | | | | |

==== Pairs ====
| Rank | Name | Total points | SP | | FS | |
|---|---|---|---|---|---|---|
| 1 | Evgenia Tarasova / Vladimir Morozov | 223.34 | 2 | 75.36 | 1 | 147.98 |
| 2 | Ksenia Stolbova / Fedor Klimov | 215.55 | 1 | 76.32 | 2 | 139.23 |
| 3 | Natalia Zabiiako / Alexander Enbert | 207.51 | 3 | 75.00 | 3 | 132.51 |
| 4 | Kristina Astakhova / Alexei Rogonov | 198.41 | 4 | 69.65 | 4 | 128.76 |
| 5 | Aleksandra Boikova / Dmitrii Kozlovskii | 195.80 | 5 | 68.20 | 5 | 127.60 |
| 6 | Daria Pavliuchenko / Denis Khodykin | 191.61 | 6 | 65.07 | 6 | 126.54 |
| 7 | Anastasia Mishina / Aleksandr Galiamov | 185.83 | 7 | 63.85 | 7 | 121.98 |
| 8 | Apollinariia Panfilova / Dmitry Rylov | 181.18 | 9 | 62.64 | 8 | 118.54 |
| 9 | Alisa Efimova / Alexander Korovin | 176.63 | 8 | 63.44 | 10 | 113.19 |
| 10 | Anastasia Poluianova / Dmitry Sopot | 174.12 | 10 | 56.10 | 9 | 118.02 |
| 11 | Tatiana Lyirova / Maksim Selkin | 164.22 | 11 | 55.51 | 11 | 108.71 |
| 12 | Bogdana Lukashevich / Alexander Stepanov | 144.73 | 12 | 52.34 | 12 | 92.39 |

==== Ice dance ====
| Rank | Name | Total points | SD | | FD | |
|---|---|---|---|---|---|---|
| 1 | Ekaterina Bobrova / Dmitri Soloviev | 193.08 | 1 | 77.55 | 1 | 115.53 |
| 2 | Alexandra Stepanova / Ivan Bukin | 188.28 | 2 | 76.97 | 2 | 111.31 |
| 3 | Tiffany Zahorski / Jonathan Guerreiro | 175.78 | 3 | 71.52 | 4 | 104.26 |
| 4 | Betina Popova / Sergey Mozgov | 167.70 | 5 | 63.27 | 3 | 104.43 |
| 5 | Sofia Evdokimova / Egor Bazin | 161.46 | 7 | 62.18 | 5 | 99.28 |
| 6 | Alla Loboda / Pavel Drozd | 159.99 | 6 | 63.07 | 6 | 96.92 |
| 7 | Vlada Solovieva / Yuri Vlasenko | 139.04 | 8 | 54.90 | 8 | 84.14 |
| 8 | Annabelle Morozov / Andrei Bagin | 137.86 | 9 | 52.32 | 7 | 85.54 |
| 9 | Ludmila Sosnitskaia / Pavel Golovishnikov | 127.91 | 10 | 49.24 | 9 | 78.67 |
| 10 | Anastasia Safronova / Ilia Zimin | 117.23 | 11 | 43.59 | 10 | 73.64 |
| 11 | Margarita Shestakova / Saveliy Ugryumov | 101.95 | 12 | 39.17 | 11 | 62.78 |
| 12 | Ekaterina Luchina / Mikhail Bragin | 97.34 | 13 | 37.85 | 12 | 59.49 |
| WD | Victoria Sinitsina / Nikita Katsalapov | | 4 | 68.46 | | |

== Junior Championships ==
The 2018 Russian Junior Championships (Russian: Первенство России среди юниоров 2018) will be held in Saransk, Mordovia from 23 to 26 January 2018. Competitors will qualify by competing in the Russian Cup series' junior-level events. The results of the Junior Championships are part of the selection criteria for the 2018 World Junior Championships.

=== Entries ===
The Russian figure skating federation published the full list of entries on 22 January 2018.

| Men | Ladies | Pairs | Ice dance |
|---|---|---|---|
| Alexey Erokhov | Alexandra Trusova | Daria Pavliuchenko / Denis Khodykin | Anastasia Skoptsova / Kirill Aleshin |
| Roman Savosin | Alena Kostornaia | Aleksandra Boikova / Dmitrii Kozlovskii | Sofia Polishchuk / Alexander Vakhnov |
| Makar Ignatov | Anastasiia Gubanova | Polina Kostiukovich / Dmitrii Ialin | Arina Ushakova / Maxim Nekrasov |
| Igor Efimchuk | Stanislava Konstantinova | Anastasia Poluianova / Dmitry Sopot | Sofia Shevchenko / Igor Eremenko |
| Vladimir Samoilov | Anastasia Tarakanova | Apollinariia Panfilova / Dmitry Rylov | Ksenia Konkina / Grigory Yakushev |
| Maksim Fedotov | Daria Panenkova | Anastasia Mishina / Aleksandr Galiamov | Elizaveta Khudaiberdieva / Nikita Nazarov |
| Matvei Vetlugin | Anastasiia Guliakova | Alexandra Koshevaya / Dmitry Bushlanov | Polina Ivanenko / Daniil Karpov |
| Petr Gumennik | Elizaveta Nugumanova | Daria Kvartalova / Alexei Sviatchenko | Eva Kuts / Dmitrii Mikhailov |
| Andrei Mozalev | Anna Shcherbakova | Tatiana Lyirova / Maksim Selkin | Sofya Tyutyunina / Alexander Shustitskiy |
| Daniil Samsonov | Viktoria Vasilieva | Ekaterina Belova / Maksim Bobrov | Alexandra Kravchenko / Gordey Khubulov |
| Egor Rukhin | Alena Kanysheva | Kseniia Akhanteva / Valerii Kolesov | Daria Drozd / Dmitry Bovin |
| Artur Danielian | Sofia Moroz | Nadezhda Labazina / Nikita Rakhmanin | Diana Davis / Fedor Varlamov |
| Egor Murashov | Viktoriia Safonova | | Elizaveta Shanaeva / Devid Naryzhnyy |
| Egor Petrov | Ksenia Tsibinova | | Angelina Lazareva / Maxim Prokofiev |
| Ilya Yablokov | Anastasia Kostyuk | | Ekaterina Andreeva / Ivan Desyatov |
| Andrei Kutovoi | Kseniia Sinitsyna | | |
| Artem Zotov | Maria Pavlova | | |
| Georgiy Kunitsa | Alexandra Cherpakova | | |

=== Results ===
==== Men ====
| Rank | Name | Total points | SP | | FS | |
|---|---|---|---|---|---|---|
| 1 | Alexey Erokhov | 248.51 | 2 | 82.52 | 1 | 165.99 |
| 2 | Roman Savosin | 235.64 | 6 | 73.48 | 2 | 162.16 |
| 3 | Artur Danielian | 235.62 | 1 | 83.91 | 3 | 151.71 |
| 4 | Egor Murashov | 224.54 | 3 | 80.32 | 5 | 144.22 |
| 5 | Egor Rukhin | 216.03 | 7 | 72.80 | 6 | 143.23 |
| 6 | Makar Ignatov | 215.24 | 5 | 74.79 | 8 | 140.45 |
| 7 | Vladimir Samoilov | 214.76 | 11 | 70.36 | 4 | 144.40 |
| 8 | Petr Gumennik | 212.82 | 10 | 70.58 | 7 | 142.24 |
| 9 | Daniil Samsonov | 210.26 | 12 | 70.00 | 9 | 140.26 |
| 10 | Andrei Kutovoi | 205.19 | 9 | 71.85 | 12 | 133.34 |
| 11 | Georgiy Kunitsa | 202.50 | 8 | 72.54 | 14 | 129.96 |
| 12 | Matvei Vetlugin | 202.25 | 15 | 67.85 | 10 | 134.40 |
| 13 | Igor Efimchuk | 201.98 | 14 | 68.36 | 11 | 133.62 |
| 14 | Ilya Yablokov | 195.28 | 13 | 69.99 | 17 | 125.29 |
| 15 | Artem Zotov | 194.37 | 16 | 66.69 | 16 | 127.68 |
| 16 | Maksim Fedotov | 192.83 | 17 | 63.75 | 15 | 129.08 |
| 17 | Andrei Mozalev | 192.31 | 4 | 75.25 | 18 | 117.06 |
| 18 | Egor Petrov | 186.14 | 18 | 55.83 | 13 | 130.31 |

==== Ladies ====
| Rank | Name | Total points | SP | | FS | |
|---|---|---|---|---|---|---|
| 1 | Alexandra Trusova | 212.09 | 1 | 74.25 | 3 | 137.84 |
| 2 | Alena Kostornaia | 211.51 | 3 | 69.88 | 1 | 141.63 |
| 3 | Stanislava Konstantinova | 206.27 | 12 | 66.40 | 2 | 139.87 |
| 4 | Anastasiia Gubanova | 205.92 | 2 | 72.10 | 4 | 133.82 |
| 5 | Daria Panenkova | 201.48 | 7 | 68.34 | 5 | 133.14 |
| 6 | Viktoria Vasilieva | 198.90 | 5 | 68.93 | 6 | 129.97 |
| 7 | Anastasia Tarakanova | 198.38 | 4 | 69.74 | 7 | 128.64 |
| 8 | Alena Kanysheva | 195.12 | 9 | 67.94 | 8 | 127.18 |
| 9 | Kseniia Sinitsyna | 191.91 | 10 | 67.46 | 10 | 124.45 |
| 10 | Anastasiia Guliakova | 191.87 | 6 | 68.88 | 11 | 122.99 |
| 11 | Elizaveta Nugumanova | 191.65 | 11 | 66.41 | 9 | 125.24 |
| 12 | Anastasia Kostyuk | 181.25 | 13 | 64.07 | 12 | 117.18 |
| 13 | Anna Shcherbakova | 179.19 | 8 | 68.19 | 16 | 111.00 |
| 14 | Viktoriia Safonova | 177.34 | 15 | 60.40 | 13 | 116.94 |
| 15 | Ksenia Tsibinova | 174.32 | 14 | 61.22 | 14 | 113.10 |
| 16 | Sofia Moroz | 164.79 | 16 | 52.08 | 15 | 112.71 |
| 17 | Alexandra Cherpakova | 142.65 | 18 | 43.22 | 17 | 99.43 |
| 18 | Maria Pavlova | 139.81 | 17 | 50.95 | 18 | 88.86 |

==== Pairs ====
| Rank | Name | Total points | SP | | FS | |
|---|---|---|---|---|---|---|
| 1 | Daria Pavliuchenko / Denis Khodykin | 188.37 | 1 | 64.16 | 1 | 124.21 |
| 2 | Anastasia Mishina / Aleksandr Galiamov | 176.90 | 4 | 61.93 | 3 | 114.97 |
| 3 | Polina Kostiukovich / Dmitrii Ialin | 176.37 | 11 | 54.66 | 2 | 121.71 |
| 4 | Aleksandra Boikova / Dmitrii Kozlovskii | 174.64 | 2 | 63.19 | 6 | 111.45 |
| 5 | Daria Kvartalova / Alexei Sviatchenko | 173.64 | 3 | 62.14 | 5 | 111.50 |
| 6 | Kseniia Akhanteva / Valerii Kolesov | 172.42 | 5 | 60.01 | 4 | 112.41 |
| 7 | Apollinariia Panfilova / Dmitry Rylov | 169.13 | 6 | 59.27 | 7 | 109.86 |
| 8 | Anastasia Poluianova / Dmitry Sopot | 165.19 | 7 | 58.42 | 9 | 106.77 |
| 9 | Nadezhda Labazina / Nikita Rakhmanin | 164.00 | 9 | 56.47 | 8 | 107.53 |
| 10 | Tatiana Lyirova / Maksim Selkin | 155.02 | 8 | 57.13 | 11 | 97.89 |
| 11 | Ekaterina Belova / Maksim Bobrov | 154.42 | 10 | 56.00 | 10 | 98.42 |
| 12 | Alexandra Koshevaya / Dmitry Bushlanov | 141.52 | 12 | 46.17 | 12 | 95.35 |

==== Ice dance ====
| Rank | Name | Total points | SD | | FD | |
|---|---|---|---|---|---|---|
| 1 | Anastasia Skoptsova / Kirill Aleshin | 162.43 | 1 | 69.54 | 1 | 92.89 |
| 2 | Sofia Shevchenko / Igor Eremenko | 154.97 | 3 | 63.69 | 2 | 91.28 |
| 3 | Arina Ushakova / Maxim Nekrasov | 153.27 | 5 | 63.06 | 3 | 90.21 |
| 4 | Sofia Polishchuk / Alexander Vakhnov | 152.82 | 4 | 63.38 | 4 | 89.44 |
| 5 | Elizaveta Khudaiberdieva / Nikita Nazarov | 149.21 | 2 | 63.99 | 6 | 85.22 |
| 6 | Ksenia Konkina / Grigory Yakushev | 146.46 | 6 | 60.83 | 5 | 85.63 |
| 7 | Eva Kuts / Dmitrii Mikhailov | 134.63 | 7 | 58.12 | 11 | 76.51 |
| 8 | Ekaterina Andreeva / Ivan Desyatov | 134.03 | 9 | 56.16 | 7 | 77.87 |
| 9 | Angelina Lazareva / Maxim Prokofiev | 133.14 | 10 | 55.46 | 9 | 77.68 |
| 10 | Polina Ivanenko / Daniil Karpov | 131.09 | 11 | 53.24 | 8 | 77.85 |
| 11 | Alexandra Kravchenko / Gordey Khubulov | 129.72 | 13 | 52.26 | 10 | 77.46 |
| 12 | Elizaveta Shanaeva / Devid Naryzhnyy | 126.93 | 14 | 51.77 | 12 | 75.16 |
| 13 | Diana Davis / Fedor Varlamov | 125.84 | 12 | 52.56 | 13 | 73.28 |
| 14 | Sofya Tyutyunina / Alexander Shustitskiy | 124.30 | 8 | 56.88 | 15 | 67.42 |
| 15 | Daria Drozd / Dmitry Bovin | 115.00 | 15 | 46.16 | 14 | 68.84 |

== International team selections ==
=== European Championships ===
Russia's team to the 2018 European Championships was published on 24 December 2017.

| | Men | Ladies | Pairs | Ice dance |
|---|---|---|---|---|
| 1 | Mikhail Kolyada | Alina Zagitova | Evgenia Tarasova / Vladimir Morozov | Ekaterina Bobrova / Dmitri Soloviev |
| 2 | Alexander Samarin | Maria Sotskova | Ksenia Stolbova / Fedor Klimov | Alexandra Stepanova / Ivan Bukin |
| 3 | Dmitri Aliev | Evgenia Medvedeva | Natalia Zabiiako / Alexander Enbert | Tiffany Zahorski / Jonathan Guerreiro |
| 1st alt. | Sergei Voronov | Stanislava Konstantinova | Kristina Astakhova / Alexei Rogonov | Betina Popova / Sergey Mozgov |
| 2nd alt. | Artur Dmitriev Jr. | Polina Tsurskaya | Aleksandra Boikova / Dmitrii Kozlovskii | Sofia Evdokimova / Egor Bazin |

=== Winter Olympics ===
Russia's team to the 2018 Winter Olympics was published on 21 January 2018.

| | Men | Ladies | Pairs | Ice dance |
|---|---|---|---|---|
| 1 | Dmitri Aliev | Alina Zagitova | Evgenia Tarasova / Vladimir Morozov | Ekaterina Bobrova / Dmitri Soloviev |
| 2 | Mikhail Kolyada | Evgenia Medvedeva | Ksenia Stolbova / Fedor Klimov (WD) | Alexandra Stepanova / Ivan Bukin (WD) |
| 3 | | Maria Sotskova | Natalia Zabiiako / Alexander Enbert | |
| Alt. | Alexander Samarin | Stanislava Konstantinova | Kristina Astakhova / Alexei Rogonov (added) | Tiffany Zahorski / Jonathan Guerreiro (added) |

=== World Junior Championships ===
Russia's team to the 2018 World Junior Championships. The International Skating Union published the full list of entries on 13 February 2018.

| | Men | Ladies | Pairs | Ice dance |
|---|---|---|---|---|
| 1 | Alexey Erokhov | Alexandra Trusova | Daria Pavliuchenko / Denis Khodykin | Anastasia Skoptsova / Kirill Aleshin |
| 2 | Roman Savosin | Alena Kostornaia | Anastasia Mishina / Aleksandr Galiamov | Sofia Shevchenko / Igor Eremenko |
| 3 | Artur Danielian | Stanislava Konstantinova | Polina Kostiukovich / Dmitrii Ialin | Arina Ushakova / Maxim Nekrasov |
| Alt. | Egor Murashov | Anastasiia Gubanova | Aleksandra Boikova / Dmitrii Kozlovskii | Sofia Polishchuk / Alexander Vakhnov |
| Alt. | Egor Rukhin | Daria Panenkova | Daria Kvartalova / Alexei Sviatchenko | Elizaveta Khudaiberdieva / Nikita Nazarov |
| Alt. | Makar Ignatov | Viktoria Vasilieva | Kseniia Akhanteva / Valerii Kolesov | Ksenia Konkina / Grigory Yakushev |

=== World Championships ===
Russia's team to the 2018 World Championships. The International Skating Union published the full list of entries on 28 February 2018.

| | Men | Ladies | Pairs | Ice dance |
|---|---|---|---|---|
| 1 | Dmitri Aliev | Alina Zagitova | Evgenia Tarasova / Vladimir Morozov | Ekaterina Bobrova / Dmitri Soloviev (WD) |
| 2 | Mikhail Kolyada | Evgenia Medvedeva (WD) | Natalia Zabiiako / Alexander Enbert | Alexandra Stepanova / Ivan Bukin |
| 3 | | Maria Sotskova | Kristina Astakhova / Alexei Rogonov | |
| Alt. | Sergei Voronov | Stanislava Konstantinova (added) | Aleksandra Boikova / Dmitrii Kozlovskii | Tiffany Zahorski / Jonathan Guerreiro (added) |
| Alt. | Alexander Samarin | Polina Tsurskaya | Ksenia Stolbova / Fedor Klimov | Betina Popova / Sergey Mozgov |
