= 2017–18 Grand Prix of Figure Skating Final =

2017–18 Grand Prix Final
- Type: Grand Prix
- Date: December 7 – 10, 2017
- Season: 2017–18
- Location: Nagoya, Japan
- Host: Japan Skating Federation
- Venue: Nagoya Civic General Gymnasium (Nippon Gaishi Hall)

Champions
- Men's singles: (United States) Nathan Chen (S) (United States) Alexei Krasnozhon (J)
- Ladies' singles: (Russia) Alina Zagitova (S) (Russia) Alexandra Trusova (J)
- Pairs: (Germany) Aliona Savchenko / Bruno Massot (S) (Australia) Ekaterina Alexandrovskaya / Harley Windsor (J)
- Ice dance: (France) Gabriella Papadakis / Guillaume Cizeron (S) (Russia) Anastasia Skoptcova / Kirill Aleshin (J)
- Previous: 2016–17 Grand Prix Final
- Next: 2018–19 Grand Prix Final
- Previous Grand Prix: 2017 Skate America
- Next Grand Prix: 2018 Skate America

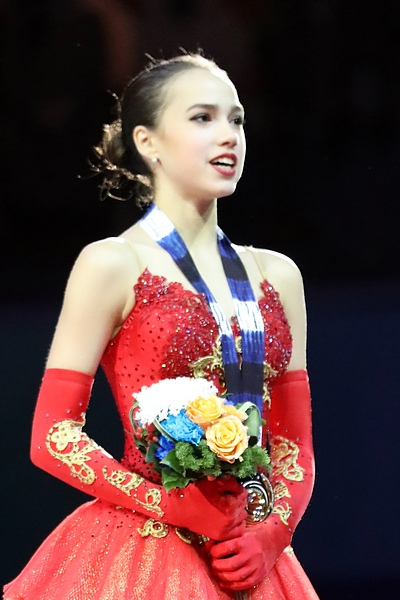

The 2017–18 Grand Prix of Figure Skating Final and ISU Junior Grand Prix Final took place from 7 to 10 December 2017 at the Nagoya Civic General Gymnasium (Nippon Gaishi Hall) in Nagoya, Japan. Nagoya was announced as the host on 3 November 2016. The combined event was the culmination of two international series — the Grand Prix of Figure Skating and the Junior Grand Prix. Medals were awarded in the disciplines of men's singles, ladies' singles, pair skating, and ice dance on the senior and junior levels."The competition featured the top six qualifiers from each discipline, based on the results of their respective series

== Records ==
The following new ISU best scores were set during this competition:

Event	Component	Skater(s)	Score	Date	Ref
Junior ladies	Short program	(Russia) Alena Kostornaia	71.65	7 December 2017	
Junior ladies	Short program	(Russia) Alexandra Trusova	73.25	7 December 2017	
Pairs	Free skate	(Germany) Aliona Savchenko / Bruno Massot	157.25	9 December 2017	
Ice dance	Total score	(France) Gabriella Papadakis / Guillaume Cizeron	202.16	9 December 2017	

== Schedule ==
(Local time)

Thursday, December 7

- 14:10 - Junior: Pairs' short
- 15:30 - Junior: Men's short
- 16:40 - Junior: Ladies' short
- Opening ceremony
- 18:15 - Senior: Pairs' short
- 19:30 - Senior: Men's short
- 20:40 - Senior: Short dance

Friday, December 8

- 14:40 - Junior: Short dance
- 16:00 - Junior: Pairs' free
- 17:30 - Junior: Men's free
- 18:55 - Senior: Ladies' short
- 20:15 - Senior: Men's free
- Victory ceremony – Senior Men, Junior Men, Junior Pairs

Saturday, December 9

- 13:45 - Junior: Free dance
- 15:05 - Junior: Ladies' free
- 16:25 - Senior: Pairs' free
- 17:55 - Senior: Free dance
- 19:20 - Senior: Ladies' free
- Victory ceremony – Senior Ladies, Junior Ice Dance, Junior Ladies, Senior Pairs, Senior Ice Dance

Sunday, December 10

- Gala exhibition

== Qualifiers ==
=== Senior-level qualifiers ===
	Men	Ladies	Pairs	Ice dance
1	(United States) Nathan Chen	(Russia) ~~Evgenia Medvedeva~~ (withdrew)	(China) Sui Wenjing / Han Cong	(France) Gabriella Papadakis / Guillaume Cizeron
2	(Japan) Shoma Uno	(Russia) Alina Zagitova	(Russia) Evgenia Tarasova / Vladimir Morozov	(Canada) Tessa Virtue / Scott Moir
3	(Russia) Mikhail Kolyada	(Canada) Kaetlyn Osmond	(Germany) Aliona Savchenko / Bruno Massot	(United States) Maia Shibutani / Alex Shibutani
4	(Russia) Sergei Voronov	(Italy) Carolina Kostner	(Canada) Meagan Duhamel / Eric Radford	(United States) Madison Chock / Evan Bates
5	(United States) Adam Rippon	(Russia) Maria Sotskova	(Russia) Ksenia Stolbova / Fedor Klimov	(United States) Madison Hubbell / Zachary Donohue
6	(China) ~~Jin Boyang~~ (withdrew)	(Japan) Wakaba Higuchi	(China) Yu Xiaoyu / Zhang Hao	(Italy) Anna Cappellini / Luca Lanotte
Alternates
1st	(United States) Jason Brown (called up)	(Japan) Satoko Miyahara (called up)	(France) Vanessa James / Morgan Ciprès	(Russia) Ekaterina Bobrova / Dmitri Soloviev
2nd	(Spain) Javier Fernández	(Japan) Kaori Sakamoto	(Russia) Kristina Astakhova / Alexei Rogonov	(Canada) Kaitlyn Weaver / Andrew Poje
3rd	(Uzbekistan) Misha Ge	(Russia) Polina Tsurskaya	(Italy) Nicole Della Monica / Matteo Guarise	(Russia) Alexandra Stepanova / Ivan Bukin

=== Junior-level qualifiers ===
	Men	Ladies	Pairs	Ice dance
1	(Russia) Alexey Erokhov	(Russia) Alexandra Trusova	(Russia) Daria Pavliuchenko / Denis Khodykin	(United States) Christina Carreira / Anthony Ponomarenko
2	(United States) Alexei Krasnozhon	(Russia) Sofia Samodurova	(Russia) Apollinariia Panfilova / Dmitry Rylov	(Russia) Anastasia Skoptcova / Kirill Aleshin
3	(United States) Camden Pulkinen	(Russia) Alena Kostornaia	(Australia) Ekaterina Alexandrovskaya / Harley Windsor	(Russia) Sofia Polishchuk / Alexander Vakhnov
4	(Japan) Mitsuki Sumoto	(Russia) Daria Panenkova	(Russia) Anastasia Poluianova / Dmitry Sopot	(Canada) Marjorie Lajoie / Zachary Lagha
5	(Russia) Makar Ignatov	(Russia) Anastasia Tarakanova	(Russia) Aleksandra Boikova / Dmitrii Kozlovskii	(Russia) Sofia Shevchenko / Igor Eremenko
6	(United States) Andrew Torgashev	(Japan) Rika Kihira	(China) Gao Yumeng / Xie Zhong	(Russia) Arina Ushakova / Maxim Nekrasov
Alternates
1st	(Canada) Joseph Phan	(Japan) Mako Yamashita	(Russia) Polina Kostiukovich / Dmitrii Ialin	(Russia) Ksenia Konkina / Grigory Yakushev
2nd	(France) Luc Economides	(Japan) Nana Araki	(Canada) Evelyn Walsh / Trennt Michaud	(Russia) Elizaveta Khudaiberdieva / Nikita Nazarov
3rd	(Russia) Roman Savosin	(South Korea) Lim Eun-soo	(United States) Laiken Lockley / Keenan Prochnow	(United States) Caroline Green / Gordon Green

== Medalists ==
=== Senior ===
Discipline	Gold	Silver	Bronze
Men	(United States) Nathan Chen	(Japan) Shoma Uno	(Russia) Mikhail Kolyada
Ladies	(Russia) Alina Zagitova	(Russia) Maria Sotskova	(Canada) Kaetlyn Osmond
Pairs	(Germany) Aliona Savchenko / Bruno Massot	(China) Sui Wenjing / Han Cong	(Canada) Meagan Duhamel / Eric Radford
Ice dance	(France) Gabriella Papadakis / Guillaume Cizeron	(Canada) Tessa Virtue / Scott Moir	(United States) Maia Shibutani / Alex Shibutani

=== Junior ===
Discipline	Gold	Silver	Bronze
Men	(United States) Alexei Krasnozhon	(United States) Camden Pulkinen	(Japan) Mitsuki Sumoto
Ladies	(Russia) Alexandra Trusova	(Russia) Alena Kostornaia	(Russia) Anastasia Tarakanova
Pairs	(Australia) Ekaterina Alexandrovskaya / Harley Windsor	(Russia) Apollinariia Panfilova / Dmitry Rylov	(Russia) Daria Pavliuchenko / Denis Khodykin
Ice dance	(Russia) Anastasia Skoptcova / Kirill Aleshin	(United States) Christina Carreira / Anthony Ponomarenko	(Russia) Sofia Polishchuk / Alexander Vakhnov

== Medals table ==
=== Senior ===
Rank	Nation	Gold	Silver	Bronze	Total
1	Russia (RUS)	1	1	1	3
2	United States (USA)	1	0	1	2
3	France (FRA)	1	0	0	1
3	Germany (GER)	1	0	0	1
5	Canada (CAN)	0	1	2	3
6	China (CHN)	0	1	0	1
6	Japan (JPN)	0	1	0	1
Totals (7 entries)		4	4	4	12

=== Junior ===
Rank	Nation	Gold	Silver	Bronze	Total
1	Russia (RUS)	2	2	3	7
2	United States (USA)	1	2	0	3
3	Australia (AUS)	1	0	0	1
4	Japan (JPN)	0	0	1	1
Totals (4 entries)		4	4	4	12

== Senior-level results ==
=== Men ===
Rank	Name	Nation	Total points	SP		FS	
1	Nathan Chen	United States	286.51	1	103.32	2	183.19
2	Shoma Uno	Japan	286.01	2	101.51	1	184.50
3	Mikhail Kolyada	Russia	282.00	3	99.22	3	182.78
4	Sergei Voronov	Russia	266.59	5	87.77	4	178.82
5	Adam Rippon	United States	254.33	6	86.19	5	168.14
6	Jason Brown	United States	253.81	4	89.02	6	164.79

=== Ladies ===
Rank	Name	Nation	Total points	SP		FS	
1	Alina Zagitova	Russia	223.30	2	76.27	1	147.03
2	Maria Sotskova	Russia	216.28	4	74.00	2	142.28
3	Kaetlyn Osmond	Canada	215.16	1	77.04	5	138.12
4	Carolina Kostner	Italy	214.65	6	72.82	3	141.83
5	Satoko Miyahara	Japan	213.49	3	74.61	4	138.88
6	Wakaba Higuchi	Japan	202.11	5	73.26	6	128.85

=== Pairs ===
Rank	Name	Nation	Total points	SP		FS	
1	Aliona Savchenko / Bruno Massot	Germany	236.68	1	79.43	1	157.25
2	Sui Wenjing / Han Cong	China	230.89	3	75.82	2	155.07
3	Meagan Duhamel / Eric Radford	Canada	210.83	5	72.18	3	138.65
4	Ksenia Stolbova / Fedor Klimov	Russia	209.26	4	73.15	5	136.11
5	Evgenia Tarasova / Vladimir Morozov	Russia	208.73	2	78.83	6	129.90
6	Yu Xiaoyu / Zhang Hao	China	207.14	6	70.15	4	136.99

=== Ice dance ===
Rank	Name	Nation	Total points	SP		FS	
1	Gabriella Papadakis / Guillaume Cizeron	France	202.16	1	82.07	1	120.09
2	Tessa Virtue / Scott Moir	Canada	199.86	2	81.53	2	118.33
3	Maia Shibutani / Alex Shibutani	United States	188.00	3	78.09	6	109.91
4	Madison Hubbell / Zachary Donohue	United States	187.40	4	74.81	4	112.59
5	Madison Chock / Evan Bates	United States	187.15	5	74.36	3	112.79
6	Anna Cappellini / Luca Lanotte	Italy	185.23	6	74.24	5	110.99

== Junior-level results ==
=== Men ===
Rank	Name	Nation	Total points	SP		FS	
1	Alexei Krasnozhon	United States	236.35	1	81.33	1	155.02
2	Camden Pulkinen	United States	217.10	5	70.90	2	146.20
3	Mitsuki Sumoto	Japan	214.45	3	77.10	3	137.35
4	Makar Ignatov	Russia	211.99	4	75.78	4	136.21
5	Alexey Erokhov	Russia	207.04	2	78.39	5	128.65
6	Andrew Torgashev	United States	160.49	6	64.73	6	95.76

=== Ladies ===
Alena Kostornaia broke the junior world record in the women's short program, 70.92 held by Alina Zagitova, with a score of 71.65. Alexandra Trusova broke it again 13 minutes later with a score of 73.25. Rika Kihira became the first woman to land triple Axel-triple toe loop combination in the free skate.

Rank	Name	Nation	Total points	SP		FS	
1	Alexandra Trusova	Russia	205.61	1	73.25	2	132.36
2	Alena Kostornaia	Russia	204.58	2	71.65	1	132.93
3	Anastasia Tarakanova	Russia	199.64	3	67.90	3	131.74
4	Rika Kihira	Japan	192.45	4	66.82	4	125.63
5	Daria Panenkova	Russia	191.16	5	65.65	5	125.51
6	Sofia Samodurova	Russia	187.74	6	65.01	6	122.73

=== Pairs ===
Rank	Name	Nation	Total points	SP		FS	
1	Ekaterina Alexandrovskaya / Harley Windsor	Australia	173.85	2	60.26	1	113.59
2	Apollinariia Panfilova / Dmitry Rylov	Russia	173.01	1	60.81	3	112.20
3	Daria Pavliuchenko / Denis Khodykin	Russia	172.94	3	59.51	2	113.43
4	Gao Yumeng / Xie Zhong	China	165.03	4	59.47	4	105.56
5	Aleksandra Boikova / Dmitrii Kozlovskii	Russia	160.80	6	55.92	5	104.88
6	Anastasia Poluianova / Dmitry Sopot	Russia	160.47	5	57.28	6	103.19

=== Ice dance ===
Rank	Name	Nation	Total points	SP		FS	
1	Anastasia Skoptcova / Kirill Aleshin	Russia	153.61	1	65.87	1	87.74
2	Christina Carreira / Anthony Ponomarenko	United States	151.76	2	64.10	2	87.66
3	Sofia Polishchuk / Alexander Vakhnov	Russia	149.04	3	63.17	3	85.87
4	Sofia Shevchenko / Igor Eremenko	Russia	144.38	5	60.10	4	84.28
5	Arina Ushakova / Maxim Nekrasov	Russia	141.88	6	58.53	5	83.35
6	Marjorie Lajoie / Zachary Lagha	Canada	141.28	4	60.52	6	80.76
