= Daria Panenkova =

Russian figure skater (born 2002)

- Panenkova performing at the 2018 Skate Canada

Personal information
- Native name: Дарья Сергеевна Паненкова (Russian)
- Full name: Daria Sergeevna Panenkova
- Born: 8 December 2002 (age 23) Moscow, Russia
- Home town: Moscow, Russia
- Height: 1.53 m (5 ft 0 in)

Figure skating career
- Country: Russia
- Coach: Anna Tsareva
- Skating club: Sambo 70
- Began skating: 2006
- Retired: September 2, 2020

Daria Sergeevna Panenkova (Russian: Дарья Сергеевна Паненкова; born 8 December 2002) is a retired Russian figure skater. She is the 2017 JGP Latvia champion.

== Personal life ==
Panenkova was born on 8 December 2002 in Moscow.

== Career ==
=== Early career ===
Panenkova began learning to skate in 2006. Her first coach was Natalia Gavrilova. Eteri Tutberidze and Sergei Dudakov became her coaches in 2016.

Panenkova finished fifth at the 2017 Russian Junior Championships after placing seventh in the short program and fifth in the free skate. Making her international debut, she won the junior gold medal at the Sofia Trophy in early February 2017.

=== 2017–2018 season ===
Panenkova's ISU Junior Grand Prix (JGP) debut came in early September 2017 in Riga, Latvia; ranked first in the short program and second in the free skate, she won the gold medal ahead of Rika Kihira. After taking silver at her second JGP assignment, she qualified to the JGP Final in Nagoya, Japan, where she placed fifth. Two weeks later, she placed eighth at the senior Russian Nationals after placing seventh in both segments of the competition, with a combined score of over 200 points.

In January 2018 she competed at the 2018 Russian Junior Championships where she placed fifth after placing seventh in the short program and fifth in the free skate.

=== 2018–2019 season ===
During the summer of 2018, Panenkova announced that she'd parted ways with coach Eteri Tutberidze and her team at Sambo 70 for unclear reasons. She joined the camp of Anna Tsareva.

Panenkova made her senior international debut in late October at the 2018 Skate Canada in Laval, Quebec. She placed last in the short program after a messy skate that included a popped triple flip, but came back in the free skate to score 117.13 points, the sixth highest free skate in the ladies event. She finished ninth overall. A week later she placed sixth at the 2018 Grand Prix of Helsinki. In late November she finished fifth at the 2018 CS Tallinn Trophy.

At the 2019 Russian Championships she placed eighteenth.

=== Retirement ===
Panekova retired on September 2, 2020, to pursue a coaching career in figure skating.

== Programs ==
Season	Short program	Free skating	Exhibition
2018–2019	Skyfall performed by Adele	You're Not From Here performed by Lara Fabian	
2017–2018	While the Trees Sleep by David Nevue; I Dreamed a Dream performed by Idina Menzel and Lea Michele (Glee) choreo. by Daniil Gleikhengauz	Ne me quitte pas performed by Celine Dion choreo. by Daniil Gleikhengauz	
2016–2017	I Can't Forgive (from Temptation of Wife) performed by Cha Soo Kyung	Ne me quitte pas performed by Celine Dion choreo. by Daniil Gleikhengauz	

== Competitive highlights ==
GP: Grand Prix; CS: Challenger Series; JGP: Junior Grand Prix

International
Event	16–17	17–18	18–19	19-20
GP Finland			6th	
GP Skate Canada			9th	
CS Alpen Trophy			WD	
CS Tallinn Trophy			5th	
International: Junior
JGP Final		5th		
JGP Latvia		1st		
JGP Poland		2nd		
Sofia Trophy	1st			
National
Russian Champ.		8th	18th	
Russian Junior Champ.	5th	5th		
J = Junior level; TBD = Assigned

== Detailed results ==
=== Senior level ===
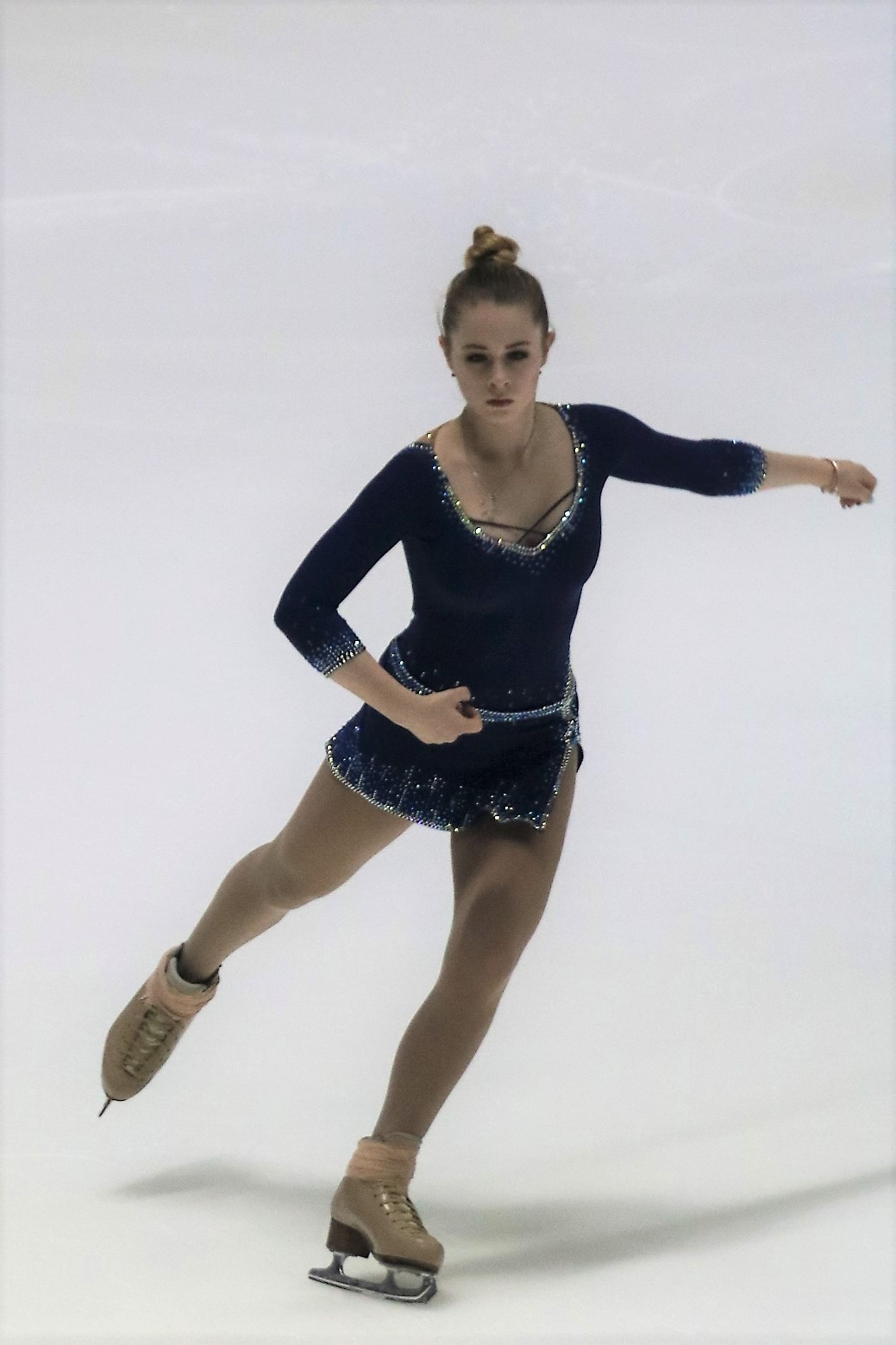
Panenkova at the 2018 Grand Prix of Helsinki

2018–19 season
Date	Event	SP	FS	Total
19–23 December 2018	2019 Russian Championships	18; 53.63	17; 114.15	18; 167.78
26 November – 2 December 2018	2018 CS Tallinn Trophy	6; 55.83	5; 117.78	5; 173.61
2–4 November 2018	2018 Grand Prix Finland	6; 58.23	9; 103.25	6; 161.48
26–28 October 2018	2018 Skate Canada	11; 51.41	6; 117.13	9; 168.54

=== Junior level ===
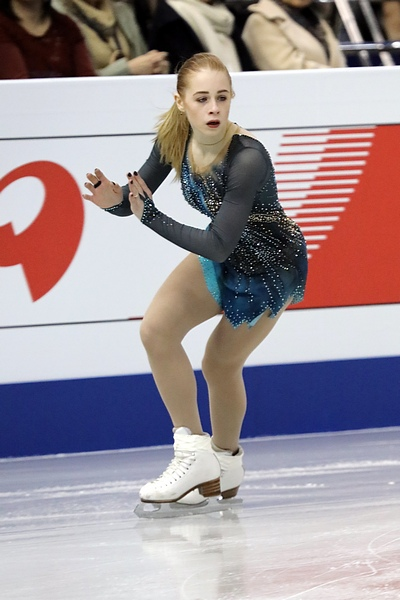
Panenkova at the 2017–18 JGP Final

2017–18 season
Date	Event	Level	SP	FS	Total
23–26 January 2018	2018 Russian Junior Championships	Junior	7; 68.34	5; 133.14	5; 201.48
21–24 December 2017	2018 Russian Championships	Senior	7; 69.83	7; 132.14	8; 201.97
7–10 December 2017	2017–18 JGP Final	Junior	5; 65.65	5; 125.51	5; 191.16
4–7 October 2017	2017 JGP Poland	Junior	2; 65.64	1; 130.91	2; 196.55
6–9 September 2017	2017 JGP Latvia	Junior	1; 66.65	2; 119.15	1; 185.80
2016–17 season
Date	Event	Level	SP	FS	Total
8–12 February 2017	2017 Sofia Trophy	Junior	1; 69.33	1; 128.04	1; 197.37
1–5 February 2017	2017 Russian Junior Championships	Junior	7; 64.34	5; 128.18	5; 192.52
