= Alexey Erokhov =

Russian figure skater

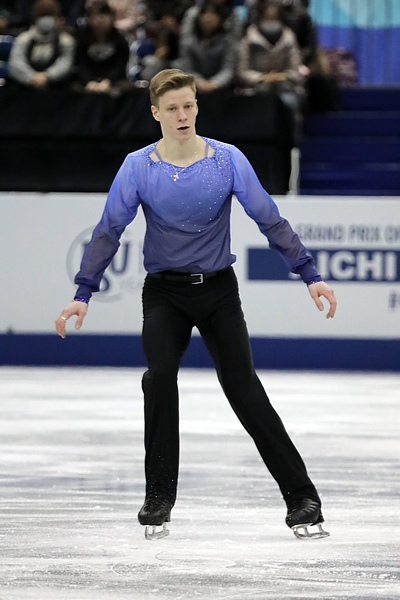
- Erokhov at the 2017–18 Junior Grand Prix Final

Personal information
- Native name: Алексей Валерьевич Ерохов (Russian)
- Full name: Alexey Valeryevich Erokhov
- Born: 5 September 1999 (age 27) Moscow, Russia
- Height: 1.77 m (5 ft 9 1/2 in)

Figure skating career
- Country: Russia
- Coach: Viktoria Butsaeva
- Skating club: Sambo 70
- Began skating: 2003
Medal record
Representing Russia
Figure skating: Men's singles
World Junior Championships
Gold medal – first place	2018 Sofia	Men's singles

Alexey Valeryevich Erokhov (Russian: Алексей Валерьевич Ерохов; born 5 September 1999) is a Russian figure skater. He is the 2018 Junior World champion, the 2017 JGP Belarus champion, the 2017 JGP Poland champion, and the 2018 Russian junior national champion.

== Personal life ==
Erokhov was born on 5 September 1999 in Moscow. As of April 2018, he is a student at Moscow's Institute for Physiculture.

== Career ==
=== Early career ===
Erokhov began learning to skate in 2003. Ilia Klimkin coached him at Moscow's CSKA Sports School until 2011; Erokhov then transferred to Sambo 70 School, also in Moscow, and began to be coached by Eteri Tutberidze and Sergei Dudakov.

He placed 12th at the 2016 Russian Junior Championships.

=== 2016–2017 season ===
Erokhov's international debut came in September 2016 at a 2016–17 ISU Junior Grand Prix (JGP) competition in Yokohama, Japan, where he won the bronze medal. Due to an injury, he withdrew from his second JGP assignment, in Germany, following the short program.

Erokhov finished 10th competing on the senior level at the 2017 Russian Championships in December 2016 and 5th at the junior event in February 2017.

=== 2017–2018 season ===
Erokhov won his first international title in September at the 2017 JGP event in Minsk, Belarus. Ranked first in both segments, he outscored the silver medalist, Andrew Torgashev, by more than 20 points. He attained his personal best total score, 232.79 points, at that competition. After winning gold in Gdańsk, Poland, he qualified to the JGP Final in Nagoya, Japan, where he placed 5th.

At the 2018 Russian Championships, Erokhov placed 8th at the senior event in December 2017 and took gold at the junior event in January 2018.

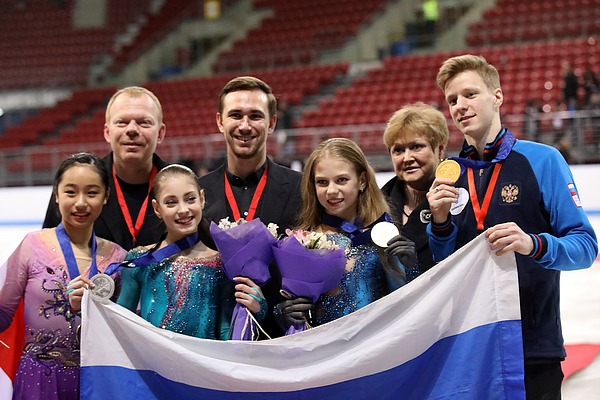
Erokhov (right) with Alexandra Trusova, Alena Kostornaia, Daniil Gleikhengauz, Sergei Dudakov and Mako Yamashita at the 2018 World Junior Championships podium

In March 2018, he won gold at the 2018 World Junior Championships in Sofia, Bulgaria. He ranked second in the short program, behind Alexei Krasnozhon, who later withdrew, and first in the free skate, outscoring the silver medalist, his teammate Artur Danielian, by more than 12 points.

=== 2018–2019 season ===
Erokhov was supposed to start his season at the Ondrej Nepela Trophy but withdrew due to injury. He competed at the Finlandia Trophy in October, where he was placed seventh. Afterward, he withdrew from both his GP events - the Rostelecom Cup and the Grand Prix of Helsinki. He also withdrew from the 2019 Russian Nationals. He competed at the 2019 Russian Junior Nationals and placed fourth. He was named to the 2019 World Junior Figure Skating Championships but later withdrew.

=== 2019–2020 season ===
Still dealing with an injury, Erokhov only competed in one competition - the Russian Cup Final, where he placed twelfth.

=== 2020–2021 season ===
In July, it was announced that he was changing coaches from longtime coaches Eteri Tutberidze and Sergei Dudakov to Viktoria Butsaeva. He was sixth at the second stage of the Russian Cup in Moscow and won bronze at the fifth stage, also in Moscow. This qualified him for the National Championships in Chelyabkinsk. However, he later withdrew from the competition.

=== 2021–2022 season ===
Returning to international competition, Erokhov placed eighth at the 2021 CS Warsaw Cup. At the 2022 Russian Championships he finished in seventh place.

== Programs ==
Season	Short program	Free skating	Exhibition
2023–2024	Love Song (from 50 First Dates) by The Cure performed by Bruno Pelletier; Your Song (from Moulin Rouge) by Elton John performed by Ewan McGregor	Turandot: Violin Fantasy on Puccini's Turandot by Vanessa-Mae; Nessun dorma by Giacomo Puccini performed by Paul Potts	
2022–2023	Love Song (from 50 First Dates) by The Cure performed by Bruno Pelletier; Your Song (from Moulin Rouge) by Elton John performed by Ewan McGregor	Notre Dame de Paris by Riccardo Cocciante	
2021–2022	Fallin' by Alicia Keys performed by Nicola Cavallaro	The Greatest Showman by Pasek and Paul	
2020–2021	Fallin' by Alicia Keys performed by Nicola Cavallaro	You Raise Me Up by Secret Garden performed by Josh Groban	
2018–2019	Black Earth by Fazıl Say	Io Ci Saro performed by Andrea Bocelli	
2017–2018	Lighthouse by Patrick Watson	Piano Concerto No. 2 by Sergei Rachmaninoff	
2016–2017	The Thrill Is Gone by B.B. King, Eric Chapman	Romeo and Juliette	

== Competitive highlights ==
GP: Grand Prix; CS: Challenger Series; JGP: Junior Grand Prix

International
Event	15–16	16–17	17–18	18–19	19–20	20–21	21–22	22–23	23–24
GP Finland				WD					
GP Rostelecom Cup				WD					
CS Finlandia Trophy				7th					
CS Ondrej Nepela				WD					
CS Warsaw Cup							8th		
International: Junior
Junior Worlds			1st	WD					
JGP Final			5th						
JGP Belarus			1st						
JGP Germany		WD							
JGP Japan		3rd							
JGP Poland			1st						
National
Russian Champ.		10th	8th	WD		WD	7th	13th	WD
Russian Jr. Champ.	12th	5th	1st	4th					
Russian Cup Final (Note: The 2023 Russian Cup Final was renamed as the 2023 Russian Grand Prix Final.)		7th	1st J	WD	9th	10th	2nd	12th	
GPR Heart of Siberia									2nd
GPR Perm Krai								4th	
GPR Velvet Season								2nd	
GPR Volga Pirouette									6th
TBD = Assigned; WD = Withdrew

== Detailed results ==
=== Senior level ===
2021–22 season
Date	Event	SP	FS	Total
December 21–26, 2021	2022 Russian Championships	4; 95.24	8; 166.24	7; 261.48
November 18–20, 2021	2021 CS Warsaw Cup	7; 77.41	11; 135.13	8; 212.54

=== Junior level ===
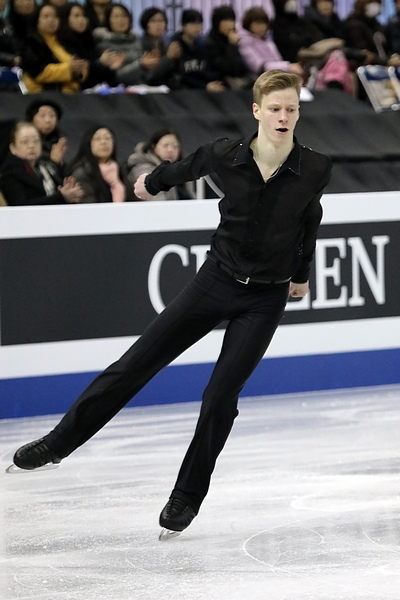
Erokhov at the 2017–18 JGP Final

Small medals for short and free programs awarded only at ISU Championships.

2018–19 season
Date	Event	Level	SP	FS	Total
February 1–4, 2019	2019 Russian Junior Championships	Junior	16; 72.33	2; 153.01	4; 225.34
October 4–7, 2018	2018 CS Finlandia Trophy	Senior	12; 62.16	4; 152.43	7; 214.59
2017–18 season
Date	Event	Level	SP	FS	Total
March 5–11, 2018	2018 World Junior Championships	Junior	2; 76.54	1; 154.98	1; 231.52
January 23–26, 2018	2018 Russian Junior Championships	Junior	2; 82.52	1; 165.99	1; 248.51
December 21–24, 2017	2018 Russian Championships	Senior	8; 80.38	7; 150.21	8; 230.59
December 7–10, 2017	2017–18 JGP Final	Junior	2; 78.39	5; 128.65	5; 207.04
October 4–7, 2017	2017 JGP Poland	Junior	1; 78.83	1; 143.06	1; 221.89
September 20–24, 2017	2017 JGP Belarus	Junior	1; 77.52	1; 155.27	1; 232.79
2016–17 season
Date	Event	Level	SP	FS	Total
February 1–5, 2017	2017 Russian Junior Championships	Junior	6; 75.23	5; 149.26	5; 224.49
December 20–26, 2016	2017 Russian Championships	Senior	13; 64.20	7; 152.60	10; 216.80
October 5–9, 2016	2016 JGP Germany	Junior	6; 64.33	WD	WD
September 7–11, 2016	2016 JGP Japan	Junior	3; 74.90	5; 142.01	3; 216.91
2015–16 season
Date	Event	Level	SP	FS	Total
January 21–23, 2016	2016 Russian Junior Championships	Junior	8; 65.26	14; 115.64	12; 180.90
