= Artur Danielian =

Russian figure skater

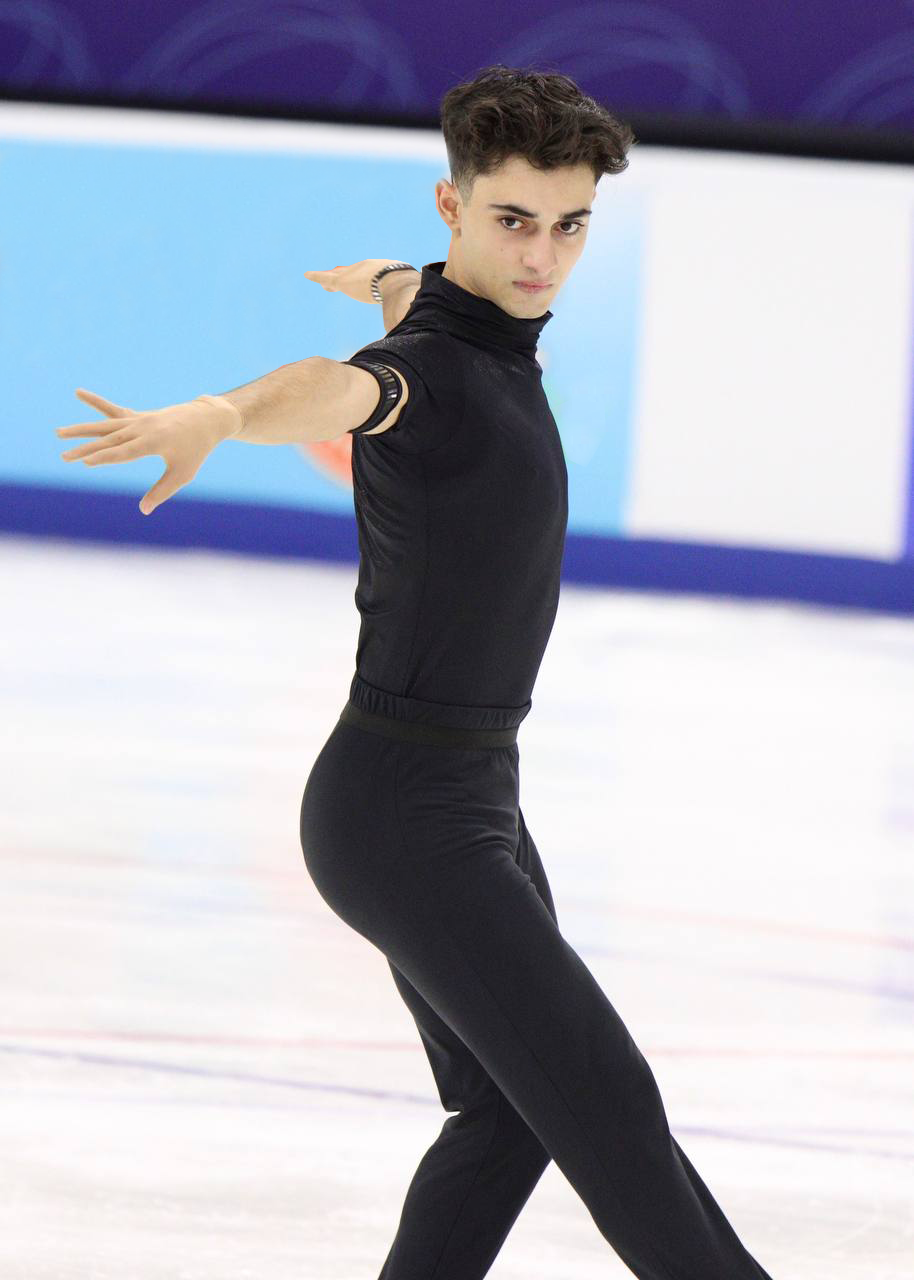
- Artur Danielian in 2022

Personal information
- Native name: Артур Ашотович Даниелян
- Full name: Artur Ashotovich Danielian
- Other names: Artur Danielyan
- Born: 17 December 2003 (age 22) Volgograd, Russia
- Home town: Moscow, Russia
- Height: 1.69 m (5 ft 6 1/2 in)

Figure skating career
- Country: Russia
- Discipline: Men's singles
- Coach: Evgeni Rukavicin
- Skating club: CSKA Moscow
- Began skating: 2007

Medal record
European Championships
| Silver medal – second place | 2020 Graz | Singles |
Russian Championships
| Silver medal – second place | 2020 Krasnoyarsk | Singles |
World Junior Championships
| Silver medal – second place | 2018 Sofia | Singles |

Artur Ashotovich Danielian (Russian: Артур Ашотович Даниелян, born 17 December 2003) is a Russian figure skater. He is the 2020 European silver medalist, the 2020 Russian national silver medalist, and the 2018 World Junior silver medalist.

== Personal life ==
Danielian was born on 17 December 2003 in Volgograd, Russia. He is the youngest of three children. He is of Armenian descent.

== Career ==
=== Early years ===
Danielian began learning to skate in 2008, after an ice rink opened near his home in Volgograd. In 2016, he moved to Moscow and joined CSKA Moscow. Marina Selitskaia and Elena Buianova became his coaches.

=== 2017–2018 season ===
In September 2017, Danielian competed at his first Junior Grand Prix (JGP) assignment, placing seventh in Zagreb, Croatia. In February 2018, he won the bronze medal at the 2018 Russian Junior Championships.

In March, Danielian competed at the 2018 World Junior Championships in Sofia, Bulgaria. He won the silver medal, behind teammate Alexey Erokhov, after placing eighth in the short program and second in the free skate.

=== 2018–2019 season ===
Danielian started his season by competing in the 2018 JGP series. At his first JGP event of the season, he placed fifth in Ljubljana, Slovenia. At his second JGP event, he placed fourth in Yerevan, Armenia. Danielian next competed at the 2018 Tallinn Trophy, where he won a gold medal.

Though only fifth at the 2019 Russian Junior Championships, Danielian was nevertheless sent to the 2019 World Junior Championships. This happened because junior champion Daniil Samsonov was not age-eligible to compete internationally and fourth-place finisher Erokhov withdrew. At the Junior Worlds, Danielian placed ninth in the short program, fifth in the free skating and fourth overall, with a new personal best score of 220.68 points.

=== 2019–2020 season ===
Competing on the Junior Grand Prix, Danielian won silver medals at both JGP Russia and JGP Croatia, ending up as first alternate to the Junior Grand Prix Final. Making his senior international debut on the Challenger series at 2019 CS Golden Spin of Zagreb, he placed fourth.

Competing at the 2020 Russian Championships at the senior level for the first time, Danielian was only thirteenth in the short program but skated a clean free program, winning that segment outright amidst rough performances from those who placed ahead in the short program. As a result, he rose to the silver medal position.

Danielian's performance earned him a berth at the 2020 European Championships, where he placed third in the short program despite stepping out of his triple Axel. Though he placed fourth in the free skate, he won the silver medal overall.

Danielan was assigned to compete at the 2020 World Championships in Montreal, but these were cancelled as a result of the coronavirus pandemic.

=== 2020–2021 season ===
An ankle injury forced Danielian to withdraw from the senior Russian test skates. Danielian was scheduled to make his Grand Prix debut at the 2020 Rostelecom Cup, but withdrew due to his surgical recovery. He subsequently withdrew from the Russian Championships for the same reason.

=== 2021–2022 season ===
Danielian returned to international competition at the 2021 Skate America, where he placed tenth. He was tenth as well at the 2021 Internationaux de France.

At the 2022 Russian Championships, Danielian finished in thirteenth place.

=== 2022-2023 season ===
It was announced in August that Danielian had switched coaches from Elena Buyanova to Evgeni Rukavicin.

== Programs ==
| Season | Short program | Free skating |
|---|---|---|
| 2023-2024 | Tango by Mgzavrebi | La boheme (Stelios Remix) by Charles Aznavour |
| 2022-2023 | I Feel Like I'm Drowning; You by Two Feet | Wyden Down; Just Wait by Riopy |
| 2020–2022 | Don Juan by Félix Gray choreo. by Nikita Mikhailov | Scheherazade by Nikolai Rimsky-Korsakov choreo. by Nikita Mikhailov |
| 2019–2020 | Don Juan by Félix Gray choreo. by Nikita Mikhailov | Gladiator by Hans Zimmer and Lisa Gerrard choreo. by Nikita Mikhailov |
| 2018–2019 | Puttin' On the Ritz by Irving Berlin choreo. by Nikita Mikhailov and Tatiana Tarasova | La donna è mobile (from Rigoletto) by Giuseppe Verdi; La traviata Overture; Libiamo ne' lieti calici (from La traviata) by Giuseppe Verdi, performed by André Rieu choreo. by Nikita Mikhailov |
| 2017–2018 | Llanto: Prologue by Vicente Pradal; Bésame Mucho (Buleria) performed by Jin Oki; Poeta en el mar by Vicente Amigo choreo. by Nikita Mikhailov | Notre-Dame de Paris by Riccardo Cocciante; Le temps des cathédrales performed by Alessandro Safina; La monture; La sorcière; La fête des fous performed by Garou, Daniel Lavoie choreo. by Nikita Mikhailov |

== Competitive highlights ==
GP: Grand Prix; CS: Challenger Series; JGP: Junior Grand Prix

International
| Event | 16–17 | 17–18 | 18–19 | 19–20 | 20–21 | 21–22 | 22–23 | 24–25 | 25-26 |
|---|---|---|---|---|---|---|---|---|---|
| Worlds | | | | C | | | | | |
| Europeans | | | | 2nd | | | | | |
| GP France | | | | | | 10th | | | |
| GP Rostelecom Cup | | | | | WD | | | | |
| GP Skate America | | | | | | 10th | | | |
| CS Golden Spin | | | | 4th | | WD | | | |
International: Junior
| Junior Worlds | | 2nd | 4th | | | | | | |
| JGP Armenia | | | 4th | | | | | | |
| JGP Croatia | | 7th | | 2nd | | | | | |
| JGP Russia | | | | 2nd | | | | | |
| JGP Slovenia | | | 5th | | | | | | |
| Denis Ten Memorial | | | | 2nd | | | | | |
| Tallinn Trophy | | | 1st | | | | | | |
National
| Russian Champ. | | | | 2nd | WD | 13th | 12th | 16th | 8th |
| Russian Jr. Champ. | WD | 3rd | 5th | WD | | | | | |
| Russian Cup Final (Note: The 2023 Russian Cup Final was renamed as the 2023 Russian Grand Prix Final.) | | | | | | | 9th | | |

== Detailed results ==
Small medals for short and free programs awarded only at ISU Championships.

=== Senior ===
2021–22 season
| Date | Event | SP | FS | Total |
|---|---|---|---|---|
| December 21–26, 2021 | 2022 Russian Championships | 9; 87.74 | 12; 160.61 | 13; 248.35 |
| November 19–21, 2021 | 2021 Internationaux de France | 8; 76.81 | 11; 144.69 | 10; 221.50 |
| October 22–24, 2021 | 2021 Skate America | 9; 68.74 | 8; 146.19 | 10; 214.93 |
2019–20 season
| Date | Event | SP | FS | Total |
| January 20–26, 2020 | 2020 European Championships | 3; 84.63 | 4; 162.11 | 2; 246.74 |
| December 24–29, 2019 | 2020 Russian Championships | 13; 75.72 | 1; 177.70 | 2; 253.42 |
| December 4–7, 2019 | 2019 CS Golden Spin of Zagreb | 10; 71.50 | 3; 155.91 | 4; 227.41 |

=== Junior ===
2019–20 season
| Date | Event | SP | FS | Total |
|---|---|---|---|---|
| 9–12 October 2019 | 2019 Denis Ten Memorial Challenge | 2; 83.95 | 2; 134.28 | 2; 218.23 |
| 25–28 September 2019 | 2019 JGP Croatia | 1; 82.11 | 3; 141.71 | 2; 223.82 |
| 11–14 September 2019 | 2019 JGP Russia | 1; 83.31 | 2; 138.62 | 2; 221.93 |
2018–19 season
| Date | Event | SP | FS | Total |
| 4–10 March 2019 | 2019 World Junior Championships | 9; 77.71 | 5; 142.97 | 4; 220.68 |
| 1–4 February 2019 | 2019 Russian Junior Championships | 3; 84.00 | 8; 140.92 | 5; 224.92 |
| 14–19 December 2018 | 2018 Russian–Chinese Youth Winter Games | 2; 74.16 | 1; 142.47 | 1; 216.63 |
| 26 November – 2 December 2018 | 2018 Tallinn Trophy | 1; 69.19 | 1; 142.01 | 1; 211.20 |
| 10–13 October 2018 | 2018 JGP Armenia | 8; 62.33 | 3; 132.97 | 4; 195.30 |
| 3–6 October 2018 | 2018 JGP Slovenia | 6; 69.30 | 2; 141.19 | 5; 210.49 |
2017–18 season
| Date | Event | SP | FS | Total |
| 5–11 March 2018 | 2018 World Junior Championships | 8; 69.15 | 2; 149.61 | 2; 218.76 |
| 23–26 January 2018 | 2018 Russian Junior Championships | 1; 83.91 | 3; 151.71 | 3; 235.62 |
| 27–30 September 2017 | 2017 JGP Croatia | 7; 61.31 | 8; 127.05 | 7; 188.36 |
