= 2017–18 ISU Junior Grand Prix =

- Type: ISU Junior Grand Prix
- Date: August 21 – December 10, 2017
- Season: 2017–18
- Previous: 2016–17 ISU Junior Grand Prix
- Next: 2018–19 ISU Junior Grand Prix

The 2017–18 ISU Junior Grand Prix was a series of junior international competitions organized by the International Skating Union that were held from August 2017 through December 2017. It was the junior-level complement to the 2017–18 ISU Grand Prix of Figure Skating. Medals were awarded in men's singles, women's singles, pair skating, and ice dance. Skaters earned points based on their placement at each event and the top six in each discipline qualified to compete at the 2017–18 Junior Grand Prix Final in Nagoya, Japan.

== Competitions ==
The locations of the JGP events change yearly. This season, the series was composed of the following events.

Date	Event	Location	Notes	Results
August 23–26	2017 JGP Australia	Brisbane, Australia	No pairs	Details
August 31 – September 2	2017 JGP Austria	Salzburg, Austria	No pairs	Details
September 6–9	2017 JGP Latvia	Riga, Latvia		Details
September 20–24	2017 JGP Belarus	Minsk, Belarus		Details
September 27–30	2017 JGP Croatia	Zagreb, Croatia		Details
October 4–7	2017 JGP Poland	Gdańsk, Poland		Details
October 11–14	2017 JGP Italy	Egna, Italy	No pairs	Details
December 7–10	(Japan) 2017–18 JGP Final	Nagoya, Japan		Details

== Entries ==
Skaters who reached the age of 13 by July 1, 2017, but had not turned 19 (singles skaters and female pairs or ice dance skaters) or 21 (male pairs or ice dance skaters) were eligible to compete on the junior circuit. Competitors were chosen by their countries according to their federations' selection procedures. The number of entries allotted to each ISU member federation was determined by their skaters' placements at the 2017 World Junior Championships in each discipline.

== Medalists ==
=== Men's singles ===
Competition	Gold	Silver	Bronze	Results
JGP Australia	(United States) Alexei Krasnozhon	(Russia) Roman Savosin	(Russia) Egor Rukhin	
JGP Austria	(United States) Camden Pulkinen	(France) Luc Economides	(Russia) Egor Murashov	
JGP Latvia	(Japan) Mitsuki Sumoto	(Russia) Makar Ignatov	(United States) Tomoki Hiwatashi	
JGP Belarus	(Russia) Alexey Erokhov	(United States) Andrew Torgashev	(Russia) Igor Efimchuk	
JGP Croatia	(United States) Alexei Krasnozhon	(Canada) Joseph Phan	(Russia) Makar Ignatov	
JGP Poland	(Russia) Alexey Erokhov	(United States) Camden Pulkinen	(Canada) Conrad Orzel	
JGP Italy	(Italy) Matteo Rizzo	(Russia) Vladimir Samoilov	(United States) Tomoki Hiwatashi	
(Japan) 2017–18 JGP Final	(United States) Alexei Krasnozhon	(United States) Camden Pulkinen	(Japan) Mitsuki Sumoto	

=== Ladies' singles ===
Competition	Gold	Silver	Bronze	Results
JGP Australia	(Russia) Alexandra Trusova	(Russia) Anastasia Gulyakova	(Japan) Riko Takino	
JGP Austria	(Russia) Anastasia Tarakanova	(South Korea) Lim Eun-soo	(Japan) Mako Yamashita	
JGP Latvia	(Russia) Daria Panenkova	(Japan) Rika Kihira	(United States) Emmy Ma	
JGP Belarus	(Russia) Alexandra Trusova	(Japan) Nana Araki	(Russia) Stanislava Konstantinova	
JGP Croatia	(Russia) Sofia Samodurova	(Japan) Mako Yamashita	(Russia) Anastasia Tarakanova	
JGP Poland	(Russia) Alena Kostornaia	(Russia) Daria Panenkova	(Japan) Rino Kasakake	
JGP Italy	(Russia) Sofia Samodurova	(Russia) Alena Kostornaia	(Japan) Rika Kihira	
(Japan) 2017–18 JGP Final	(Russia) Alexandra Trusova	(Russia) Alena Kostornaia	(Russia) Anastasia Tarakanova	

=== Pairs ===
Competition	Gold	Silver	Bronze	Results
JGP Latvia	(Russia) Apollinariia Panfilova / Dmitry Rylov	(Russia) Aleksandra Boikova / Dmitrii Kozlovskii	(Canada) Evelyn Walsh / Trennt Michaud	
JGP Belarus	(Russia) Daria Pavliuchenko / Denis Khodykin	(Russia) Anastasia Poluianova / Dmitry Sopot	(Russia) Apollinariia Panfilova / Dmitry Rylov	
JGP Croatia	(Russia) Polina Kostiukovich / Dmitrii Ialin	(China) Gao Yumeng / Xie Zhong	(Russia) Aleksandra Boikova / Dmitrii Kozlovskii	
JGP Poland	(Australia) Ekaterina Alexandrovskaya / Harley Windsor	(Russia) Daria Pavliuchenko / Denis Khodykin	(Russia) Anastasia Poluianova / Dmitry Sopot	
(Japan) 2017–18 JGP Final	(Australia) Ekaterina Alexandrovskaya / Harley Windsor	(Russia) Apollinariia Panfilova / Dmitry Rylov	(Russia) Daria Pavliuchenko / Denis Khodykin	

=== Ice dance ===
Competition	Gold	Silver	Bronze	Results
JGP Australia	(Russia) Sofia Polishchuk / Alexander Vakhnov	(Canada) Marjorie Lajoie / Zachary Lagha	(Russia) Elizaveta Khudaiberdieva / Nikita Nazarov	
JGP Austria	(United States) Christina Carreira / Anthony Ponomarenko	(Russia) Ksenia Konkina / Grigory Yakushev	(France) Natacha Lagouge / Corentin Rahier	
JGP Latvia	(Russia) Sofia Shevchenko / Igor Eremenko	(Russia) Anastasia Shpilevaya / Grigory Smirnov	(United States) Caroline Green / Gordon Green	
JGP Belarus	(United States) Christina Carreira / Anthony Ponomarenko	(Russia) Anastasia Skoptcova / Kirill Aleshin	(Russia) Arina Ushakova / Maxim Nekrasov	
JGP Croatia	(Canada) Marjorie Lajoie / Zachary Lagha	(Russia) Sofia Shevchenko / Igor Eremenko	(Russia) Ksenia Konkina / Grigory Yakushev	
JGP Poland	(Russia) Anastasia Skoptcova / Kirill Aleshin	(Russia) Elizaveta Khudaiberdieva / Nikita Nazarov	(United States) Caroline Green / Gordon Green	
JGP Italy	(Russia) Arina Ushakova / Maxim Nekrasov	(Russia) Sofia Polishchuk / Alexander Vakhnov	(Canada) Alicia Fabbri / Claudio Pietrantonio	
(Japan) 2017–18 JGP Final	(Russia) Anastasia Skoptcova / Kirill Aleshin	(United States) Christina Carreira / Anthony Ponomarenko	(Russia) Sofia Polishchuk / Alexander Vakhnov	

== Overall standings ==
=== Medal standings ===
Rank	Nation	Gold	Silver	Bronze	Total
1	Russia (RUS)	18	17	15	50
2	United States (USA)	6	4	5	15
3	Australia (AUS)	2	0	0	2
4	Japan (JPN)	1	3	5	9
5	Canada (CAN)	1	2	3	6
6	Italy (ITA)	1	0	0	1
7	France (FRA)	0	1	1	2
8	China (CHN)	0	1	0	1
8	South Korea (KOR)	0	1	0	1
Totals (9 entries)		29	29	29	87

=== Standings per nation ===
Starting in the 2015–16 season, the ISU added standings per nation. Points were calculated for each discipline separately before being combined for a total score per nation. For each discipline, each nation combined the points from up to four JGP events. A country did not have to use the same events for each discipline (e.g. a country can combine points from JGP events in France, Japan, Russia, and Slovenia for pairs while using Czech Republic, Japan, Estonia, and Germany for ice dance). For each discipline at each event, each nation combined the points from up to two skaters/teams. The points that each skater/team earned is based on placement. Placement to point conversion was the same as for qualification, with first place earning 15 points, second earning 13 points, etc. In the event ties in the total scores, the country with the fewer skaters/teams (only counting skaters/teams from whom points were combined), won the tie breaker. If the tie was not broken, the nations would have the same rank.

The current standings were:

No.	Nation	Men	Ladies	Pairs	Ice dance	Total
1	Russia	141	184	132	167	624
2	United States	70	43	35	71	219
3	Canada	37	11	32	73	153
4	Japan	50	80	0	0	130
5	China	10	0	39	0	49
5	France	26	0	3	20	49
7	South Korea	0	45	0	0	45
8	Italy	30	6	0	9	45
9	Ukraine	12	11	0	21	44
10	Australia	0	0	24	0	24

== Qualification ==
At each event, skaters earned points toward qualification for the Junior Grand Prix Final. Following the seventh event, the top six highest-scoring skaters/teams advanced to the Final. The points earned per placement were as follows.

Placement	Singles	Pairs/Ice dance
1st	15	15
2nd	13	13
3rd	11	11
4th	9	9
5th	7	7
6th	5	5
7th	4	4
8th	3	3
9th	2	—
10th	1	—

There were originally seven tie-breakers in cases of a tie in overall points:

1. Highest placement at an event. If a skater placed 1st and 3rd, the tiebreaker is the 1st place, and that beats a skater who placed 2nd in both events.
2. Highest combined total scores in both events. If a skater earned 200 points at one event and 250 at a second, that skater would win in the second tie-break over a skater who earned 200 points at one event and 150 at another.
3. Participated in two events.
4. Highest combined scores in the free skating/free dance portion of both events.
5. Highest individual score in the free skating/free dance portion from one event.
6. Highest combined scores in the short program/short dance of both events.
7. Highest number of total participants at the events.

If a tie remained, it was considered unbreakable and the tied skaters all advanced to the Junior Grand Prix Final.

=== Qualifiers ===
No.	Men	Ladies	Pairs	Ice dance
1	(Russia) Alexey Erokhov	(Russia) Alexandra Trusova	(Russia) Daria Pavliuchenko / Denis Khodykin	(United States) Christina Carreira / Anthony Ponomarenko
2	(United States) Alexei Krasnozhon	(Russia) Sofia Samodurova	(Russia) Apollinariia Panfilova / Dmitry Rylov	(Russia) Anastasia Skoptcova / Kirill Aleshin
3	(United States) Camden Pulkinen	(Russia) Alena Kostornaia	(Australia) Ekaterina Alexandrovskaya / Harley Windsor	(Russia) Sofia Polishchuk / Alexander Vakhnov
4	(Japan) Mitsuki Sumoto	(Russia) Daria Panenkova	(Russia) Anastasia Poluianova / Dmitry Sopot	(Canada) Marjorie Lajoie / Zachary Lagha
5	(Russia) Makar Ignatov	(Russia) Anastasia Tarakanova	(Russia) Aleksandra Boikova / Dmitrii Kozlovskii	(Russia) Sofia Shevchenko / Igor Eremenko
6	(United States) Andrew Torgashev	(Japan) Rika Kihira	(China) Gao Yumeng / Xie Zhong	(Russia) Arina Ushakova / Maxim Nekrasov

Alternates

No.	Men	Ladies	Pairs	Ice dance
1	(Canada) Joseph Phan	(Japan) Mako Yamashita	(Russia) Polina Kostiukovich / Dmitrii Ialin	(Russia) Ksenia Konkina / Grigory Yakushev
2	(France) Luc Economides	(Japan) Nana Araki	(Canada) Evelyn Walsh / Trennt Michaud	(Russia) Elizaveta Khudaiberdieva / Nikita Nazarov
3	(Russia) Roman Savosin	(South Korea) Eunsoo Lim	(United States) Laiken Lockley / Keenan Prochnow	(United States) Caroline Green / Gordon Green

== Top scores ==
=== Men's singles ===
Top 10 best scores in the men's combined total
No.	Skater	Nation	Score	Event
1	Alexei Krasnozhon	United States	236.35	2017–18 JGP Final
2	Alexey Erokhov	Russia	232.79	2017 JGP Belarus
3	Matteo Rizzo	Italy	229.18	2017 JGP Italy
4	Joseph Phan	Canada	221.07	2017 JGP Croatia
5	Makar Ignatov	Russia	219.22	2017 JGP Croatia
6	Camden Pulkinen	United States	217.10	2017–18 JGP Final
7	Mitsuki Sumoto	Japan	214.45	2017–18 JGP Final
8	Andrew Torgashev	United States	212.71	2017 JGP Belarus
9	Vladimir Samoilov	Russia	211.74	2017 JGP Italy
10	Tomoki Hiwatashi	United States	206.28	2017 JGP Italy

Top 10 best scores in the men's short program
No.	Skater	Nation	Score	Event
1	Alexei Krasnozhon	United States	81.33	2017–18 JGP Final
2	Alexey Erokhov	Russia	78.83	2017 JGP Poland
3	Vladimir Samoilov	Russia	77.65	2017 JGP Italy
4	Matteo Rizzo	Italy	77.24	2017 JGP Italy
5	Mitsuki Sumoto	Japan	77.10	2017–18 JGP Final
6	Igor Efimchuk	Russia	76.10	2017 JGP Belarus
7	Joseph Phan	Canada	76.09	2017 JGP Croatia
8	Makar Ignatov	Russia	75.78	2017–18 JGP Final
9	Andrew Torgashev	United States	74.34	2017 JGP Belarus
10	Tomoki Hiwatashi	United States	73.28	2017 JGP Italy

Top 10 best scores in the men's free skating
No.	Skater	Nation	Score	Event
1	Alexey Erokhov	Russia	155.27	2017 JGP Belarus
2	Alexei Krasnozhon	United States	155.02	2017–18 JGP Final
3	Matteo Rizzo	Italy	151.94	2017 JGP Italy
4	Makar Ignatov	Russia	147.22	2017 JGP Croatia
5	Camden Pulkinen	United States	146.20	2017–18 JGP Final
6	Joseph Phan	Canada	144.98	2017 JGP Croatia
7	Mitsuki Sumoto	Japan	140.26	2017 JGP Latvia
8	Andrew Torgashev	United States	138.37	2017 JGP Belarus
9	Conrad Orzel	Canada	134.98	2017 JGP Poland
10	Vladimir Samoilov	Russia	134.09	2017 JGP Italy

=== Ladies' singles ===
Top 10 best scores in the ladies' combined total
No.	Skater	Nation	Score	Event
1	Alexandra Trusova	Russia	205.61	2017–18 JGP Final
2	Alena Kostornaia	Russia	204.58	2017–18 JGP Final
3	Anastasia Tarakanova	Russia	199.64	2017–18 JGP Final
4	Daria Panenkova	Russia	196.55	2017 JGP Poland
5	Rika Kihira	Japan	192.45	2017–18 JGP Final
6	Sofia Samodurova	Russia	192.19	2017 JGP Italy
7	Lim Eun-soo	South Korea	186.34	2017 JGP Austria
8	Nana Araki	Japan	183.00	2017 JGP Belarus
9	Stanislava Konstantinova	Russia	181.98	2017 JGP Belarus
10	Anastasia Gulyakova	Russia	181.43	2017 JGP Australia

Top 10 best scores in the ladies' short program
No.	Skater	Nation	Score	Event
1	Alexandra Trusova	Russia	73.25	2017–18 JGP Final
2	Alena Kostornaia	Russia	71.65	2017–18 JGP Final
3	Anastasia Tarakanova	Russia	67.90	2017–18 JGP Final
4	Rika Kihira	Japan	66.82	2017–18 JGP Final
5	Sofia Samodurova	Russia	66.67	2017 JGP Italy
6	Daria Panenkova	Russia	66.65	2017 JGP Latvia
7	Mako Yamashita	Japan	65.22	2017 JGP Croatia
8	Lim Eun-soo	South Korea	64.79	2017 JGP Austria
9	Nana Araki	Japan	64.57	2017 JGP Italy
10	Alisa Fedichkina	Russia	63.48	2017 JGP Latvia

Top 10 best scores in the ladies' free skating
No.	Skater	Nation	Score	Event
1	Alena Kostornaia	Russia	132.93	2017–18 JGP Final
2	Alexandra Trusova	Russia	132.36	2017–18 JGP Final
3	Anastasia Tarakanova	Russia	131.74	2017–18 JGP Final
4	Daria Panenkova	Russia	130.91	2017 JGP Poland
5	Rika Kihira	Japan	125.63	2017–18 JGP Final
6	Sofia Samodurova	Russia	125.52	2017 JGP Italy
7	Stanislava Konstantinova	Russia	122.13	2017 JGP Belarus
8	Lim Eun-soo	South Korea	121.55	2017 JGP Austria
9	Nana Araki	Japan	120.02	2017 JGP Belarus
10	Anastasia Gulyakova	Russia	117.96	2017 JGP Australia

=== Pairs ===
Top 10 best scores in the pairs' combined total
No.	Team	Nation	Score	Event
1	Ekaterina Alexandrovskaya / Harley Windsor	Australia	173.85	2017–18 JGP Final
2	Apollinariia Panfilova / Dmitry Rylov	Russia	173.01	2017–18 JGP Final
3	Daria Pavliuchenko / Denis Khodykin	Russia	172.94	2017–18 JGP Final
4	Polina Kostiukovich / Dmitrii Ialin	Russia	165.48	2017 JGP Croatia
5	Gao Yumeng / Xie Zhong	China	165.03	2017–18 JGP Final
6	Aleksandra Boikova / Dmitrii Kozlovskii	Russia	163.21	2017 JGP Croatia
7	Anastasia Poluianova / Dmitry Sopot	Russia	162.14	2017 JGP Belarus
8	Evelyn Walsh / Trennt Michaud	Canada	153.73	2017 JGP Latvia
9	Laiken Lockley / Keenan Prochnow	United States	151.27	2017 JGP Latvia
10	Audrey Lu / Misha Mitrofanov	United States	150.65	2017 JGP Belarus

Top 10 best scores in the pairs' short program
No.	Team	Nation	Score	Event
1	Aleksandra Boikova / Dmitrii Kozlovskii	Russia	61.23	2017 JGP Croatia
2	Ekaterina Alexandrovskaya / Harley Windsor	Australia	61.00	2017 JGP Poland
3	Apollinariia Panfilova / Dmitry Rylov	Russia	60.81	2017–18 JGP Final
4	Gao Yumeng / Xie Zhong	China	59.99	2017 JGP Croatia
4	Daria Pavliuchenko / Denis Khodykin	Russia	59.99	2017 JGP Poland
6	Polina Kostiukovich / Dmitrii Ialin	Russia	59.68	2017 JGP Croatia
7	Anastasia Poluianova / Dmitry Sopot	Russia	57.28	2017–18 JGP Final
8	Tang Feiyao / Yang Yongchao	China	54.00	2017 JGP Belarus
9	Audrey Lu / Misha Mitrofanov	United States	52.94	2017 JGP Belarus
10	Laiken Lockley / Keenan Prochnow	United States	52.65	2017 JGP Latvia

Top 10 best scores in the pairs' free skating
No.	Team	Nation	Score	Event
1	Ekaterina Alexandrovskaya / Harley Windsor	Australia	113.59	2017 JGP Latvia
2	Daria Pavliuchenko / Denis Khodykin	Russia	113.43	2017 JGP Latvia
3	Apollinariia Panfilova / Dmitry Rylov	Russia	112.20	2017 JGP Latvia
4	Polina Kostiukovich / Dmitrii Ialin	Russia	105.80	2017 JGP Croatia
5	Anastasia Poluianova / Dmitry Sopot	Russia	105.77	2017 JGP Belarus
6	Gao Yumeng / Xie Zhong	China	105.56	2017–18 JGP Final
7	Aleksandra Boikova / Dmitrii Kozlovskii	Russia	104.88	2017 JGP Croatia
8	Evelyn Walsh / Trennt Michaud	Canada	103.58	2017 JGP Latvia
9	Audrey Lu / Misha Mitrofanov	United States	99.12	2017 JGP Belarus
10	Laiken Lockley / Keenan Prochnow	United States	98.63	2017 JGP Latvia

=== Ice dance ===
Top 10 best scores in the combined total (ice dance)
No.	Team	Nation	Score	Event
1	Anastasia Skoptcova / Kirill Aleshin	Russia	153.61	2017–18 JGP Final
2	Christina Carreira / Anthony Ponomarenko	United States	151.76	2017–18 JGP Final
3	Marjorie Lajoie / Zachary Lagha	Canada	150.30	2017 JGP Croatia
4	Sofia Polishchuk / Alexander Vakhnov	Russia	149.04	2017–18 JGP Final
5	Arina Ushakova / Maxim Nekrasov	Russia	149.01	2017 JGP Italy
6	Sofia Shevchenko / Igor Eremenko	Russia	145.05	2017 JGP Croatia
7	Ksenia Konkina / Grigory Yakushev	Russia	143.77	2017 JGP Croatia
8	Anastasia Shpilevaya / Grigory Smirnov	Russia	139.83	2017 JGP Latvia
9	Alicia Fabbri / Claudio Pietrantonio	Canada	136.01	2017 JGP Italy
10	Elizaveta Khudaiberdieva / Nikita Nazarov	Russia	133.85	2017 JGP Poland

Top 10 best scores in the short dance
No.	Team	Nation	Score	Event
1	Anastasia Skoptcova / Kirill Aleshin	Russia	65.87	2017–18 JGP Final
2	Christina Carreira / Anthony Ponomarenko	United States	64.10	2017–18 JGP Final
3	Sofia Polishchuk / Alexander Vakhnov	Russia	63.17	2017–18 JGP Final
4	Marjorie Lajoie / Zachary Lagha	Canada	62.89	2017 JGP Croatia
5	Arina Ushakova / Maxim Nekrasov	Russia	61.07	2017 JGP Italy
6	Ksenia Konkina / Grigory Yakushev	Russia	60.16	2017 JGP Croatia
7	Anastasia Shpilevaya / Grigory Smirnov	Russia	60.11	2017 JGP Latvia
8	Sofia Shevchenko / Igor Eremenko	Russia	60.10	2017–18 JGP Final
9	Elizaveta Khudaiberdieva / Nikita Nazarov	Russia	59.03	2017 JGP Poland
10	Alicia Fabbri / Claudio Pietrantonio	Canada	57.28	2017 JGP Italy

Top 10 best scores in the free dance
No.	Team	Nation	Score	Event
1	Arina Ushakova / Maxim Nekrasov	Russia	87.94	2017 JGP Italy
2	Anastasia Skoptcova / Kirill Aleshin	Russia	87.74	2017–18 JGP Final
3	Christina Carreira / Anthony Ponomarenko	United States	87.66	2017–18 JGP Final
4	Marjorie Lajoie / Zachary Lagha	Canada	87.41	2017 JGP Croatia
5	Sofia Polishchuk / Alexander Vakhnov	Russia	85.87	2017–18 JGP Final
6	Ksenia Konkina / Grigory Yakushev	Russia	85.17	2017 JGP Austria
7	Sofia Shevchenko / Igor Eremenko	Russia	85.08	2017 JGP Croatia
8	Anastasia Shpilevaya / Grigory Smirnov	Russia	79.72	2017 JGP Latvia
9	Alicia Fabbri / Claudio Pietrantonio	Canada	78.73	2017 JGP Italy
10	Evgeniia Lopareva / Alexey Karpushov	Russia	76.31	2017 JGP Austria
