= Egor Murashov =

Russian-Swiss figure skater

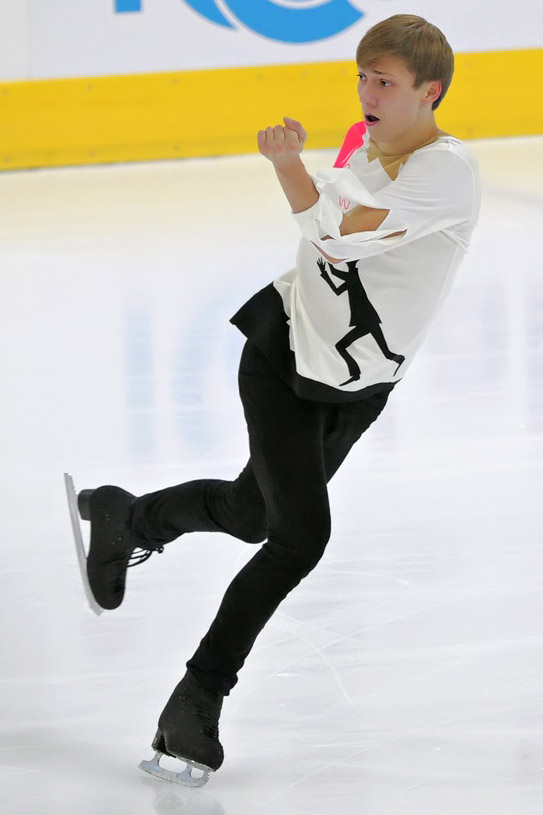
- Murashov at the 2019 Lombardia Trophy

Personal information
- Native name: Егор Дмитриевич Мурашов (Russian)
- Full name: Egor Dmitrievich Murashov
- Other names: Yegor Murasov
- Born: 20 May 2000 (age 26) Moscow, Russia
- Home town: Moscow
- Height: 1.69 m (5 ft 6 1/2 in)

Figure skating career
- Country: Switzerland
- Coach: Viktoria Butsaeva
- Skating club: Olympic School "Moskvich"
- Began skating: 2005

Medal record
Representing Switzerland
Swiss Championships
Silver medal – second place	2022 Lucerne	Singles

Egor Dmitrievich Murashov (Russian: Егор Дмитриевич Мурашов; born 20 May 2000) is a retired Russian-born figure skater who competed for Switzerland. For Russia, he is the 2018 Christmas Cup champion, the 2019 Sofia Trophy champion, and the 2019 Cup of Tyrol bronze medalist. On the junior level, he is the 2017 JGP Austria bronze medalist.

In May 2021, Murashov announced that he would begin representing Switzerland from the 2021–22 season. He is the 2022 Swiss national silver medalist.

== Programs ==
Season	Short program	Free skating
2021–2022		
2020–2021		
2019–2020	Egal was Kommt (No Matter What Happens) choreo. by Galina Ishchenko	King Arthur: Legend of the Sword by Daniel Pemberton choreo. by Galina Ishchenko
2018–2019	Marionetka by Alexander Shunkov choreo. by Galina Ishchenko	Sir Duke; Lately performed by Stevie Wonder choreo. by Galina Ishchenko
2017–2018	Aknaszlatina by Okean Elzy choreo. by Galina Ishchenko	Sir Duke; Lately performed by Stevie Wonder choreo. by Galina Ishchenko

== Competitive highlights ==
CS: Challenger Series; JGP: Junior Grand Prix

For Switzerland

International
Event	2021–22
National
Swiss Champ.	2nd

For Russia

International
Event	13–14	14–15	15–16	16–17	17–18	18–19	19–20	20–21
CS Lombardia							5th	
CS Warsaw Cup							10th	
Christmas Cup						1st		
Cup of Tyrol				6th		3rd		
Ice Star				6th				
Sofia Trophy						1st		
International: Junior
JGP Austria					3rd			
JGP Italy					8th			
JGP Lithuania						4th		
Bavarian Open	3rd	1st	3rd					
Cup of Nice			2nd	1st				
Gardena Spring		2nd						
Merano Cup				1st				
National
Russian Champ.			16th		14th	8th	14th	13th
Russian Junior				14th	4th	6th		
