= Tatiana Danilova =

Russian pair skater (born 1993)

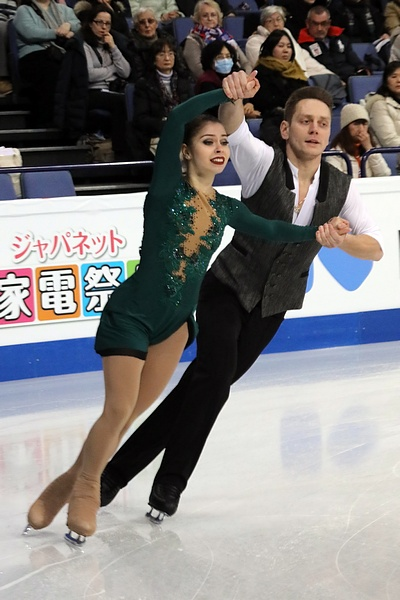
- Danilova and Kamianchuk in 2017

Personal information
- Native name: Татьяна Сергеевна Данилова
- Born: 25 November 1993 (age 32) Moscow, Russia
- Height: 1.54 m (5 ft 1/2 in)

Figure skating career
- Country: Belarus
- Partner: Mikalai Kamianchuk
- Coach: Dmitri Kaplun
- Skating club: SDUSHOR Minsk
- Began skating: 2000

Tatiana Sergeyevna Danilova (Russian: Татьяна Сергеевна Данилова; born 25 November 1993) is a Russian pair skater. Competing for Russia with Andrei Novoselov, she is the 2010 Golden Spin of Zagreb silver medalist. Competing for Belarus with Mikalai Kamianchuk, she is the 2015 Toruń Cup silver medalist and has finished in the top ten at two European Championships (2016, 2017).

== Career ==
=== In Russia ===
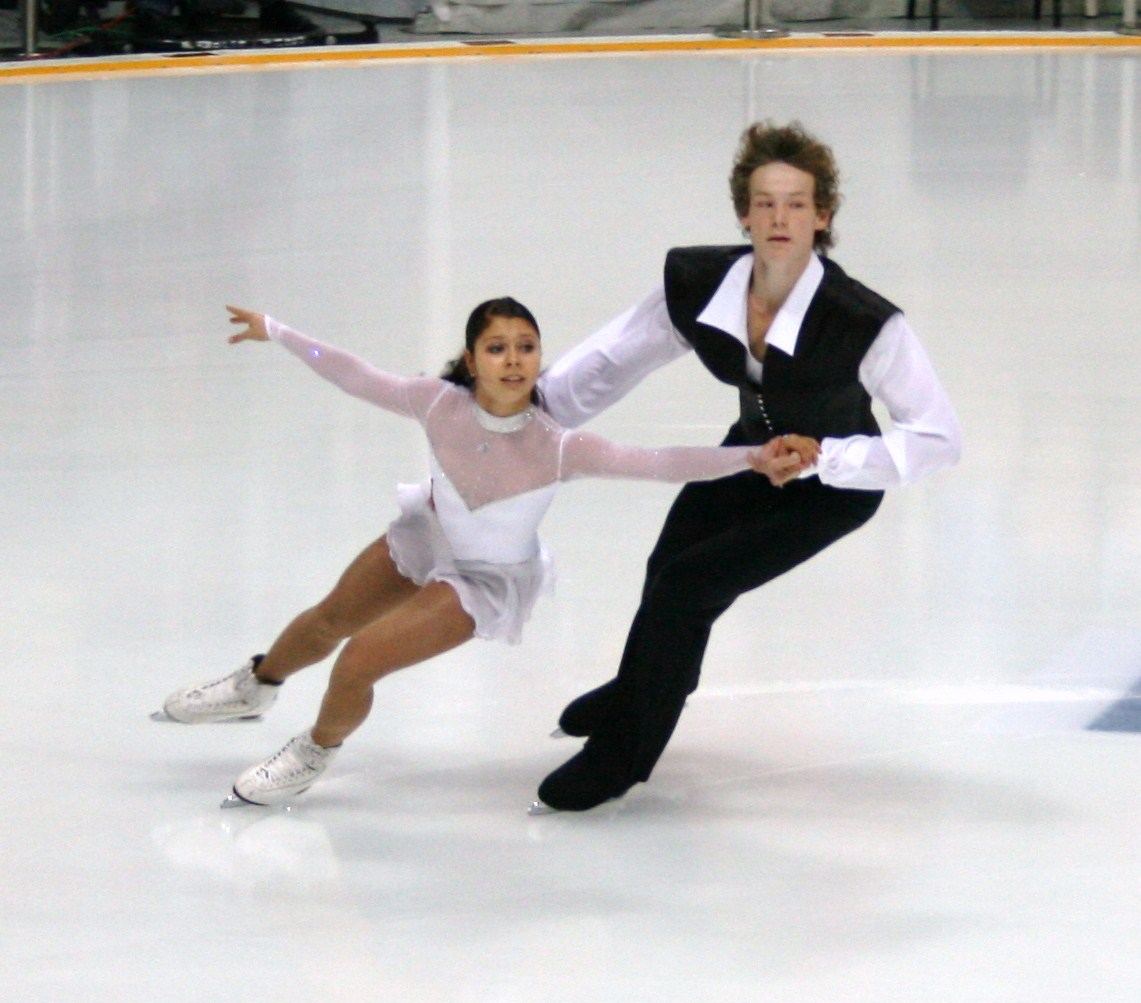
Tatiana Danilova and Andrei Novoselov in 2009

Danilova began learning to skate in 2000.

In 2009, she teamed up with Andrei Novoselov. The pair was coached by Inna Utkina in Moscow and represented Russia. They placed 8th at the 2010 Russian Junior Championships and appeared on the ISU Junior Grand Prix series the following season, placing 4th in Austria and 6th in Germany. Competing on the senior level, they won the silver medal at the 2010 Golden Spin of Zagreb.

Danilova was unable to skate for a year following a shoulder operation so she told Novoselov that he could look for another partner. After returning to skating, she performed in ice shows for two years.

=== Partnership with Kamianchuk ===
In the 2014–15 season, Danilova began competing for Belarus with Mikalai Kamianchuk. Making their debut as a pair, they placed 6th at the CS Golden Spin of Zagreb in December 2014. They won the silver medal at the Toruń Cup in January 2015. They were second at the Belarusian Championships behind Maria Paliakova / Nikita Bochkov.

Danilova/Kamianchuk finished 10th at the 2016 European Championships in Bratislava and 20th at the 2016 World Championships in Boston, coached by Dmitri Kaplun in Minsk.

The pair placed 10th at the 2017 European Championships in Ostrava. They placed 23rd at the 2017 World Championships in Helsinki.

== Programs ==
=== With Kamianchuk ===
Season	Short program	Free skating
2016–18	Sherlock Holmes by Hans Zimmer	Game of Thrones by Ramin Djawadi
2015–16	Don Juan	Notre-Dame de Paris by Riccardo Cocciante

=== With Novoselov ===
Season	Short program	Free skating
2010–11	Concerto for Violin by Saint-Preux	El Dia Que Me Quieras by Raúl Di Blasio

== Competitive highlights ==
CS: Challenger Series; JGP: Junior Grand Prix

=== With Kamianchuk for Belarus ===
International
Event	2014–15	2015–16	2016–17	2017–18
World Champ.		20th	23rd	
European Champ.		10th	10th	
CS Golden Spin of Zagreb	6th		8th	
CS Mordovian Ornament		5th		
CS Nebelhorn Trophy				12th
CS Warsaw Cup		4th	6th	
Toruń Cup	2nd			
National
Belarusian Champ.	2nd	1st	1st	

=== With Novoselov for Russia ===
International
Event	2009–10	2010–11
Golden Spin of Zagreb		2nd
JGP Austria		4th
JGP Germany		6th
National
Russian Junior Champ.	8th	
