= Russian Figure Skating Cup =

Figure skating series

- Status: Active
- Genre: Russian Grand Prix Events
- Frequency: Annual
- Country: Russia
- Previous event: 2026 Russian Figure Skating Cup
- Next event: 2027 Russian Figure Skating Cup
- Organiser: Figure Skating Federation of Russia

The Russian Cup in Figure Skating (Russian Cup - Rostelecom) (Russian: Кубок России) is a series of annual All-Russian figure skating competitions among Russian figure skaters, organized by the Figure Skating Federation of Russia.

The Russian Cup competitions include five stages and the final of the Russian Cup, in which athletes compete in men's and women's single skating, pair figure skating and in ice dancing.

The most frequent venues of the stages and the Cup Final: Moscow, Kazan, Samara, Perm, as well as Yoshkar-Ola, Sochi and Dmitrov.

The Russo-Ukrainian war resulted in a ban on Russian skaters competing in any ISU competitions, from the 2022 World Championships through to the end of the 2024-2025 season, after which they were allowed with restrictions. As a result, the Russian stage of the international ISU Grand Prix, the Rostelecom Cup (named after the same sponsor as the national cup - Rostelecom), was cancelled. The same year, Russian officials renamed The Russian Cup as The Russian Grand Prix as a "replacement."

== Participants ==
Competitions are held for two categories:

- adults - according to the category of the Master of Sports (MS), provided that the athlete has reached 14 years old - no more than 18 athletes in the form
- Juniors - by category Candidates for the Master of Sports (CCM) - in single skating (no more than 30 athletes in the form), pair skating and ice dancing.

The strongest athletes of the territorial organizations of the FFKK of Russia are allowed to participate in the Cup Stages. In single skating, athletes can only apply for two stages of the Cup one by one of the ranks: the KMS or the MS. The list of participants is approved by the President of the Federation on the recommendation of the All-Russian Coaching Council.

== Stages of the Russian Cup ==
Stages of the Cup of Russia are held from September to December. Athletes who took places 1 to 8 at the first and second stages of the Cup are allowed to participate in stages III, IV and V.

According to the results of participation in two stages of the Cup of Russia, the admission of athletes (pairs) to participation in Russian Championship, Russian Championships and Cup Finals is determined.

== Final Cup of Russia ==
The final competition "Cup of Russia - Rostelecom" allowed athletes on the highest number of points scored in the form of two stages of the Cup of Russia, accrued for the places occupied by athletes. Also allowed are candidates for the national team of Russia among adults and juniors. The final list of participants is approved by the President of the Federation on the recommendation of the All-Russian Coaching Council. Up to 12 athletes (couples) are allowed in each type of program. Total not more than 144 people.

The final of the Russian Cup is traditionally held in February.

== Senior medalists ==
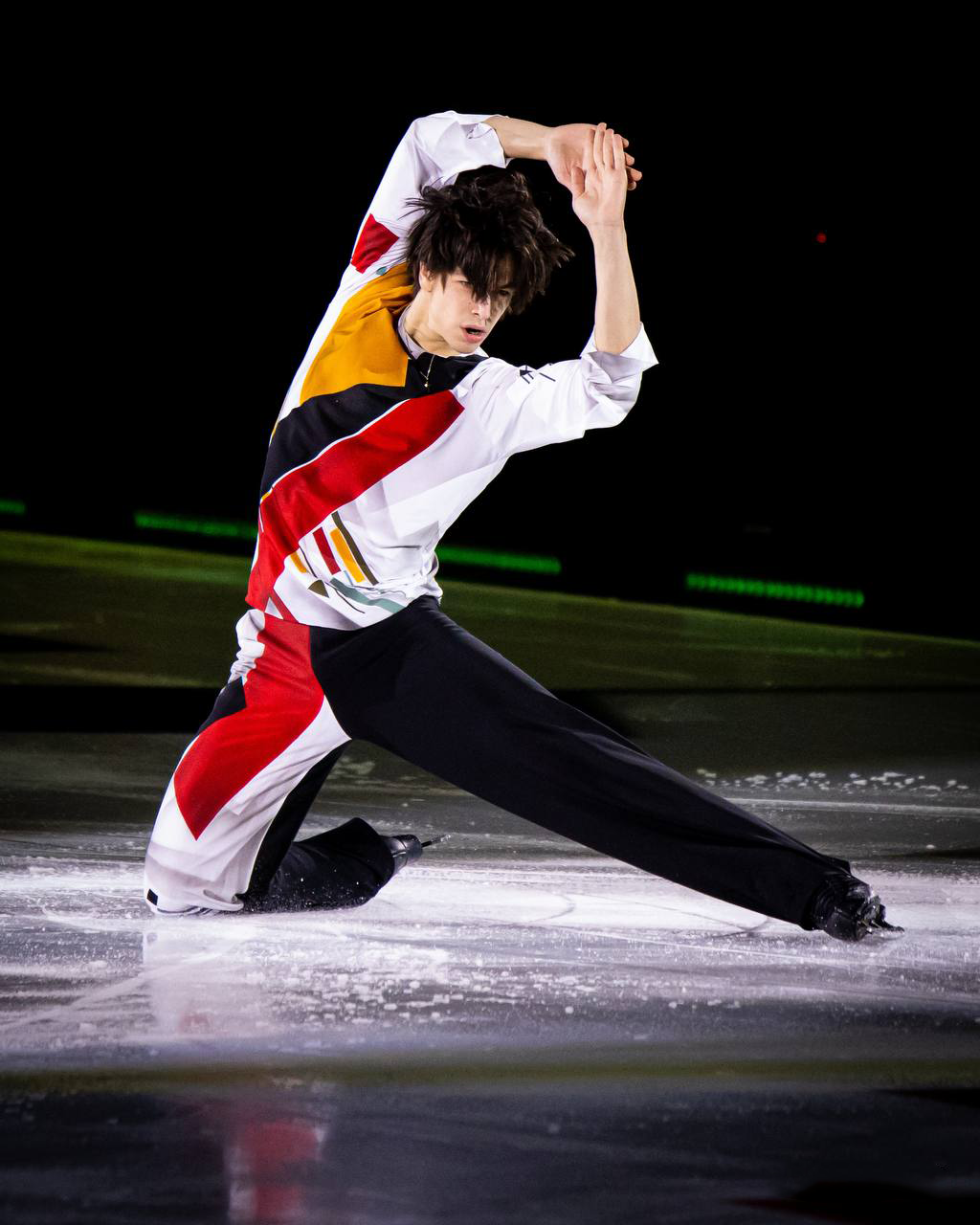
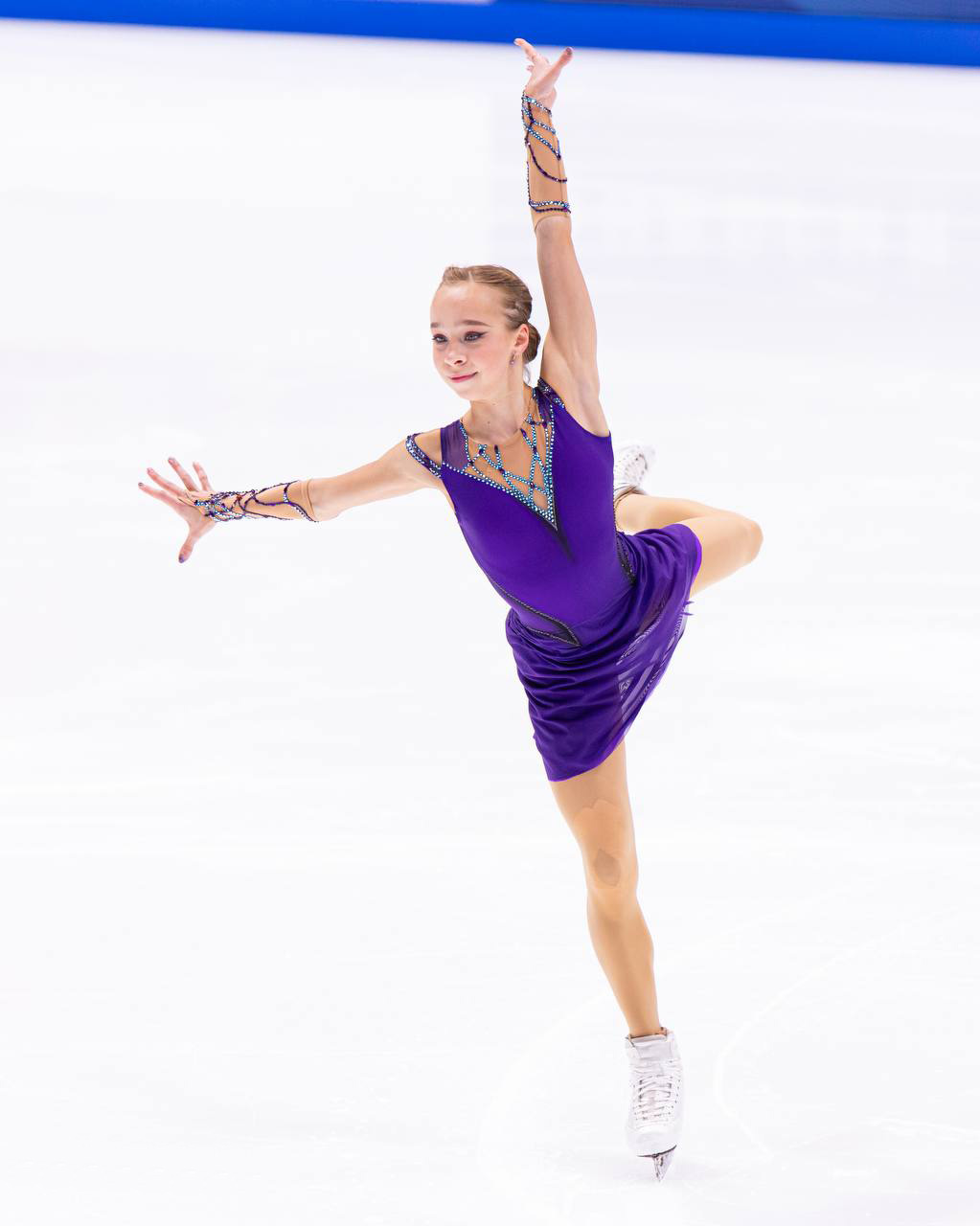
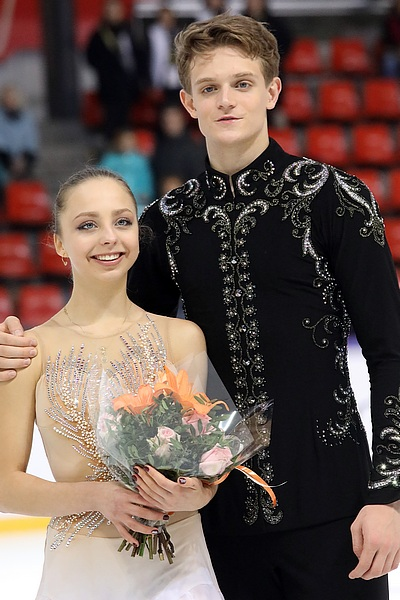
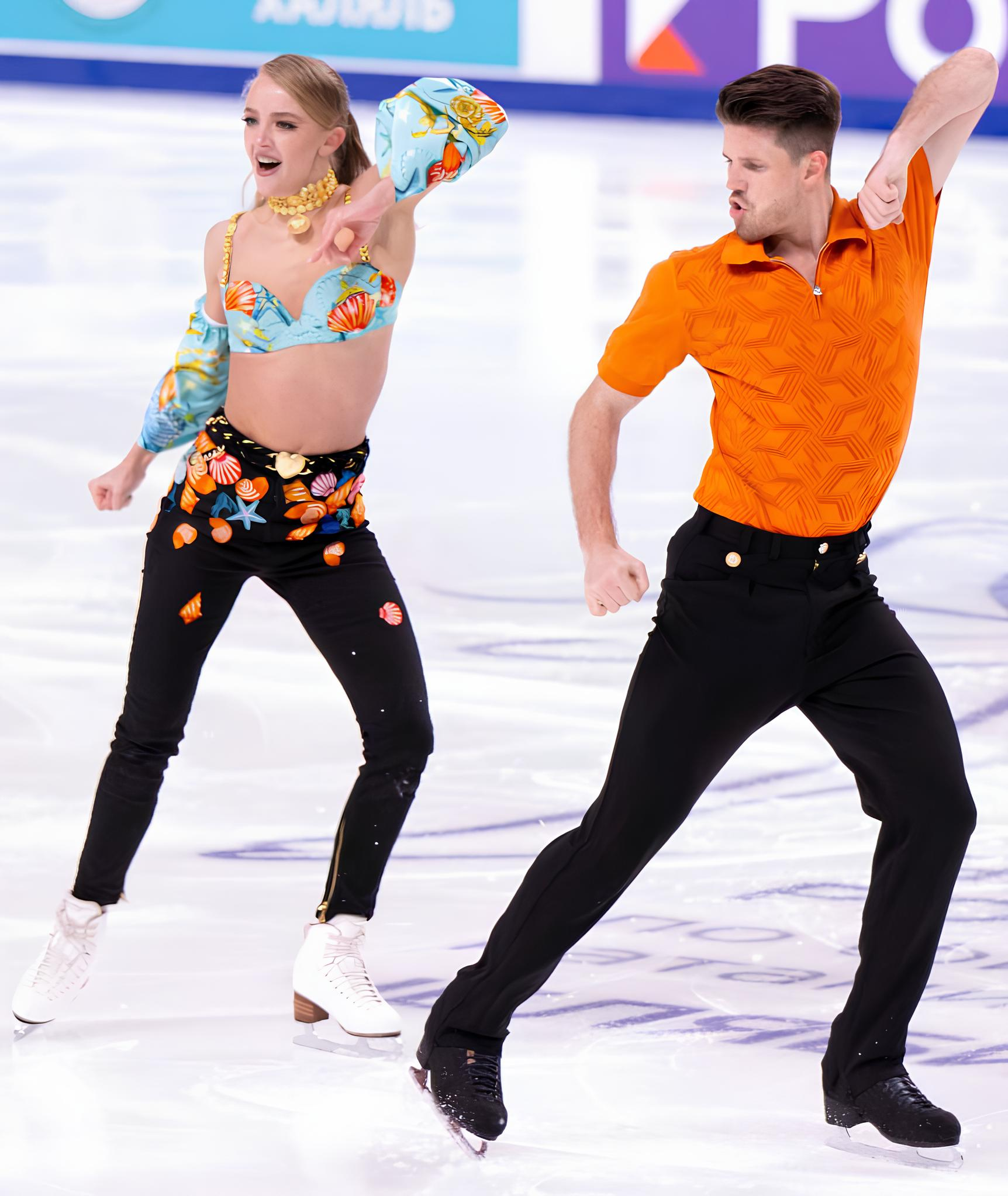
The reigning Russian Cup Final champions (from left to right): Petr Gumennik (men's singles), Alisa Dvoeglazova (women's singles), Aleksandra Boikova / Dmitrii Kozlovskii (pairs), Alexandra Stepanova / Ivan Bukin (ice dance)

=== Men ===
Year	Location	Gold	Silver	Bronze
1997	Tver	Oleg Tataurov	Alexander Abt	
2001	Nizhny Novgorod	Denis Balandin	Dmitry Nikitin	Denis Leushin
2002	Nizhny Novgorod	Alexander Shubin	Anton Smirnov	Denis Balandin
2003	Nizhny Novgorod	Mikhail Magerovski	Alexander Uspenski	Konstantin Menshov
2005	Nizhny Novgorod	Konstantin Menshov	Mikhail Magerovski	Vladimir Uspenski
2006	Nizhny Novgorod	Konstantin Menshov	Denis Leushin	Andrey Lezin
2007	Tver	Sergei Dobrin	Konstantin Menshov	Mikhail Magerovski
2008	Tver	Konstantin Menshov	Ivan Tretiakov	Stanislav Kovalev
2009	Tver	Ivan Tretiakov	Denis Leushin	Stanislav Kovalev
2010	Tver	Mark Shakhmatov	Sergei Dobrin	Denis Leushin
2011	Yoshkar-Ola	Konstantin Menshov	Sergei Voronov	Mark Shakhmatov
2012	Stary Oskol	Konstantin Menshov	Vladislav Sezganov	Gordei Gorshkov
2013	Tver	Konstantin Menshov	Sergei Voronov	Vladislav Sezganov
2014	Veliky Novgorod	Morisi Kvitelashvili	Gordei Gorshkov	Andrei Lazukin
2015	Saransk	Gordei Gorshkov	Anton Shulepov	Andrei Lazukin
2016	Saransk	Artur Dmitriev Jr.	Alexander Samarin	Sergey Voronov
2017	Saransk	Alexander Samarin	Alexander Petrov	Sergey Voronov
2018	Veliky Novgorod	Anton Shulepov	Konstantin Milyukov	Vladimir Samoilov
2019	Veliky Novgorod	Andrei Lazukin	Alexander Petrov	Anton Shulepov
2020	Veliky Novgorod	Makar Ignatov	Anton Shulepov	Ilya Yablokov
2021	Moscow	Evgeni Semenenko	Petr Gumennik	Dmitri Aliev
2022	Moscow	Makar Ignatov	Alexey Erokhov	Matvei Vetlugin
2023	Saint Petersburg	Petr Gumennik	Dmitri Aliev	Mark Kondratiuk
2024	Magnitogorsk	Evgeni Semenenko	Mark Kondratiuk	Vladislav Dikidzhi
2025	Krasnoyarsk	Petr Gumennik	Mark Kondratiuk	Evgeni Semenenko
2026	Chelyabinsk	Petr Gumennik	Evgeni Semenenko	Nikolaj Ugozhaev

=== Women ===
Year	Location	Gold	Silver	Bronze
2001	Nizhny Novgorod	Tatiana Basova	Svetlana Chernysheva	Tatyana Plyusheva
2002	Nizhny Novgorod	Anna Agapova	Olga Bobryashova	Ekaterina Vasilyeva
2003	Nizhny Novgorod	Anna Agapova	Ekaterina Vasilyeva	Alim Gershkovich
2004				
2005	Nizhny Novgorod	Angelina Turenko	Valeria Vorobieva	Alima Gershkovich
2006	Nizhny Novgorod	Alexandra Ievleva	Valeria Vorobieva	Olga Naidenova
2007	Tver	Elena Sokolova	Katarina Gerboldt	Alexandra Ievleva
2008	Tver	Oksana Gozeva	Olga Naidenova	Ksenia Basilchuk
2009	Tver	Alexandra Ievleva	Maria Artemieva	Arina Martynova
2010	Tver	Elizaveta Tuktamysheva	Katarina Gerboldt	Sofya Biryukova
2011	Yoshkar-Ola	Rosa Sheveleva	Ksenia Makarova	Yulia Lipnitskaya
2012	Stary Oskol	Elena Radionova	Anna Shershak	Maria Artemyeva
2013	Tver	Alena Leonova	Polina Agafonova	Nikol Gosviani
2014	Novgorod	Anna Pogorilaya	Evgenia Medvedeva	Maria Artemyeva
2015	Saransk	Alexandra Proklova	Elizaveta Yushchenko	Alena Leonova
2016	Saransk	Alena Leonova	Yulia Lipnitskaya	Serafima Sakhanovich
2017	Saransk	Polina Tsurskaya	Elizaveta Tuktamysheva	Valeria Mikhailova
2018	Veliky Novgorod	Alena Kostornaia	Anastasiia Gubanova	Daria Panenkova
2019	Veliky Novgorod	Evgenia Medvedeva	Elizaveta Tuktamysheva	Viktoria Vasilieva
2020	Veliky Novgorod	Anastasiia Guliakova	Anastasiia Gubanova	Maria Talalaikina
2021	Moscow	Kamila Valieva	Maya Khromykh	Daria Usacheva
2022	Moscow	Veronika Yametova	Veronika Peterimova	Anastasia Morozova
2023	Saint Petersburg	Adeliia Petrosian	Elizaveta Tuktamysheva	Sofia Akateva
2024	Magnitogorsk	Adeliia Petrosian	Anna Frolova	Kseniia Sinitsyna
2025	Krasnoyarsk	Adeliia Petrosian	Alina Gorbachova	Anna Frolova
2026	Chelyabinsk	Alisa Dvoeglazova	Daria Sadkova	Kamilla Neljubova

=== Pairs ===
Year	Location	Gold	Silver	Bronze
2001	Nizhny Novgorod	Viktoria Borzenkova / Andrei Chuvilaev	Anastasia Kuzmina / Stanislav Evdokimov	
2002	Nizhny Novgorod	Elena Riabchuk / Stanislav Zakharov	Julia Karbovskaya / Sergei Slavnov	Arina Ushakova / Alexander Popov
2003	Nizhny Novgorod	Anastasia Kuzmina / Stanislav Evdokimov	Ekaterina Ragozina / Pavel Slyusarenko	Olga Prokuronova / Alexander Goncharov
2004				
2005	Nizhny Novgorod	Anastasia Ignatieva / Vitali Dubina	Ekaterina Gladkova / Mikhail Bolshedvorsky	
2006	Nizhny Novgorod	Arina Ushakova / Sergei Karev	Daria Kazyuchits / Sergey Roslyakov	Ekaterina Vasilieva / Alexander Smirnov
2007	Tver	Yuko Kawaguchi / Alexander Smirnov	Elena Efaieva / Alexei Menshikov	Daria Kazyuchits / Sergey Roslyakov
2008	Tver	Anastasia Khodkova / Pavel Sliusarenko	Elena Efaieva / Sergey Roslyakov	Yevgeny Papunin / Vitaly Babkin
2009	Tver			
2010	Tver	Anastasia Martiusheva / Alexei Rogonov	Kristina Astakhova / Nikita Bochkov	Ekaterina Sheremetieva / Egor Chudin
2011	Yoshkar-Ola	Katarina Gerboldt / Alexander Enbert	Anastasia Martiusheva / Alexei Rogonov	Evgenia Tarasova / Egor Chudin
2012	Stary Oskol	Katarina Gerboldt / Alexander Enbert	Evgenia Tarasova / Egor Chudin	Maria Vigalova / Egor Zakroev
2013	Tver	Ksenia Stolbova / Fedor Klimov	Kristina Astakhova / Maxim Kurdyukov	Natalia Mitina / Yuri Shevchuk
2014	Novgorod	Julia Antipova / Nodari Maisuradze	Katarina Gerboldt / Alexander Enbert	Kristina Astakhova / Maxim Kurdyukov
2015	Saransk	Kristina Astakhova / Alexei Rogonov	Vasilisa Davankova / Alexander Enbert	Vera Bazarova / Andrei Deputat
2016	Saransk	Vera Bazarova / Andrei Deputat	Alisa Efimova / Alexander Korovin	Sofia Biryukova / Andrei Filonov
2017	Saransk	Kristina Astakhova / Alexei Rogonov	Alisa Efimova / Alexander Korovin	Anastasia Poluianova / Maksim Selkin
2018	Veliky Novgorod	Alisa Efimova / Alexander Korovin	Sofia Buzaeva / Elisey Ivanov	Daria Kvartalova / Alexei Sviatchenko
2019	Veliky Novgorod	Alina Pepeleva / Roman Pleshkov	Lina Kudriavtseva / Ilia Spiridonov	Anastasia Poluianova / Dmitry Sopot
2020	Veliky Novgorod	Anastasia Mishina / Aleksandr Galliamov	Yasmina Kadyrova / Ivan Balchenko	Alina Pepeleva / Roman Pleshkov
2021	Moscow	Anastasia Mishina / Aleksandr Galliamov	Daria Pavliuchenko / Denis Khodykin	Yasmina Kadyrova / Ivan Balchenko
2022	Moscow	Anastasia Mukhortova / Dmitry Evgenyev	Ekaterina Geynish / Ilya Mironov	Alina Solovyova / Elisey Ivanov
2023	Saint Petersburg	Aleksandra Boikova / Dmitrii Kozlovskii	Anastasia Mishina / Aleksandr Galliamov	Evgenia Tarasova / Vladimir Morozov
2024	Magnitogorsk	Anastasia Mishina / Aleksandr Galliamov	Aleksandra Boikova / Dmitrii Kozlovskii	Iuliia Artemeva / Aleksei Briukhanov
2025	Krasnoyarsk	Anastasia Mishina / Aleksandr Galliamov	Natalia Khabibullina / Ilya Knyazhuk	Aleksandra Boikova / Dmitrii Kozlovskii
2026	Chelyabinsk	Aleksandra Boikova / Dmitrii Kozlovskii	Anastasia Mishina / Aleksandr Galliamov	Ekaterina Chikmareva / Matvei Janchenkov

=== Ice dancing ===
Year	Location	Gold	Silver	Bronze
2001	Nizhny Novgorod	Ekaterina Gvozdkova / Timur Alaskhanov	Ekaterina Rubleva / Ivan Shefer	Marina Kurochkina / Dmitry Zlobin
2002	Nizhny Novgorod	Ekaterina Gvozdkova / Timur Alaskhanov	Jana Khokhlova / Sergei Novitski	Ekaterina Rubleva / Ivan Shefer
2003	Nizhny Novgorod	Svetlana Kulikova / Vitaly Novikov	Jana Khokhlova / Sergei Novitski	Julia Zlobina / Alexei Sitnikov
2004				
2005	Nizhny Novgorod	Olga Gmyzina / Ivan Lobanov	Inna Ladyagina / Anton Shabalin	
2006	Nizhny Novgorod	Ekaterina Rubleva / Ivan Shefer	Olga Gmyzina / Ivan Lobanov	Anastasia Yakovleva / Ivan Manvelov
2007	Tver	Ekaterina Rubleva / Ivan Shefer	Olga Gmyzina / Ivan Lobanov	Anastasia Yakovleva / Ivan Manvelov
2008	Tver	Ekaterina Rubleva / Ivan Shefer	Julia Zlobina / Alexei Sitnikov	Olga Kolotilina / Alexander Bortsov
2009	Tver	Anastasia Platonova / Alexander Grachev	Julia Zlobina / Alexei Sitnikov	Alexandra Chistyakova / Vladimir Kurochkin
2010	Tver	Ekaterina Rubleva / Ivan Shefer	Ekaterina Riazanova / Ilia Tkachenko	Julia Zlobina / Alexei Sitnikov
2011	Yoshkar-Ola	Anastasia Kabanova / Nikolay Babin	Evgenia Shakhtarina / Denis Kozlov	Ekaterina Riazanova / Ilia Tkachenko
2012	Stary Oskol	Valeria Starygina / Ivan Volobuiev	Anna Polikarpova / Maxim Kirillov	Evgenia Shakhtarina / Denis Kozlov
2013	Tver	Ksenia Monko / Kirill Khaliavin	Victoria Sinitsina / Ruslan Zhiganshin	Valeria Losev / Denis Lunin
2014	Velikiy Novgorod	Valeria Zenkova / Valerie Sinitsin	Svetlana Khomiakova / Nikita Shubo-Yablonski	Daria Scheglova / Anton Novikov
2015	Saransk	Evgenia Kosigina / Nikolai Moroshkin	Liudmila Sosnitskaia / Pavel Golovishnikov	Margarita Belyakova / Dmitry Volkov
2016	Saransk	Tiffany Zahorski / Jonathan Guerreiro	Liudmila Sosnitskaia / Pavel Golovishnikov	Anastasia Safronova / Ilia Zimin
2017	Saransk	Tiffany Zahorski / Jonathan Guerreiro	Betina Popova / Sergey Mozgov	Vasilisa Davankova / Anton Shibnev
2018	Velikiy Novgorod	Annabelle Morozov / Andrei Bagin	Olga Bibikhina / Daniil Zvorykin	Anastasia Safronova / Ilia Zimin
2019	Veliky Novgorod	Tiffany Zahorski / Jonathan Guerreiro	Betina Popova / Sergey Mozgov	Annabelle Morozov / Andrei Bagin
2020	Veliky Novgorod	Anastasia Shpilevaya / Grigory Smirnov	Ekaterina Mironova / Evgenii Ustenko	Julia Tultseva / Anatoliy Belovodchenko
2021	Moscow	Victoria Sinitsina / Nikita Katsalapov	Annabelle Morozov / Andrei Bagin	Ekaterina Mironova / Evgenii Ustenko
2022	Moscow	Ekaterina Mironova / Evgenii Ustenko	Elizaveta Pasechnik / Dmitry Blinov	Vlada Pavlenina / Aleksandr Aleksanyan
2023	Saint Petersburg	Vasilisa Kaganovskaia / Valeriy Angelopol	Elizaveta Shanaeva / Pavel Drozd	Sofya Tyutyunina / Andrei Bagin
2024	Magnitogorsk	Alexandra Stepanova / Ivan Bukin	Elizaveta Khudaiberdieva / Egor Bazin	Irina Khavronina / Devid Naryzhnyy
2025	Krasnoyarsk	Vasilisa Kaganovskaia / Maksim Nekrasov	Elizaveta Pasechnik / Dario Cirisano	Anna Scherbakova / Egor Goncharov
2026	Chelyabinsk	Alexandra Stepanova / Ivan Bukin	Vasilisa Kaganovskaia / Maksim Nekrasov	Ekaterina Mironova / Evgeniy Ustenko
