= Mikalai Kamianchuk =

Belarusian pair skater (born 1987)

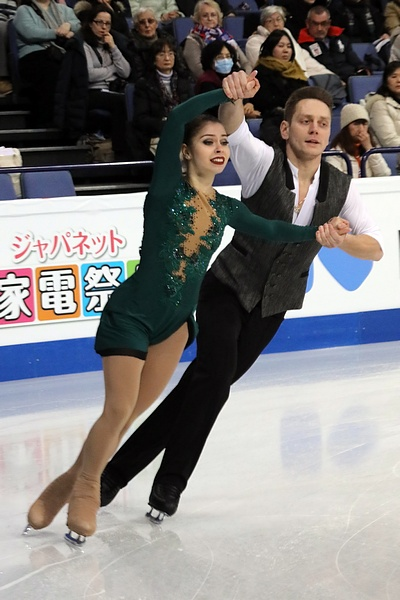
- Danilova / Kamianchuk in 2017

Personal information
- Native name: Мікалай Камянчук
- Born: 9 August 1987 (age 38) Minsk, Byelorussian SSR, Soviet Union
- Height: 1.75 m (5 ft 9 in)

Figure skating career
- Country: Belarus
- Partner: Tatiana Danilova
- Coach: Dmitri Kaplun
- Skating club: Skating School Minsk
- Began skating: 1992

Mikalai Kamianchuk (Belarusian: Мікалай Камянчук; born 9 August 1987) is a Belarusian pair skater. He has placed in the top ten at four European Championships, skating with Lubov Bakirova and Tatiana Danilova.

== Career ==
=== Early career ===
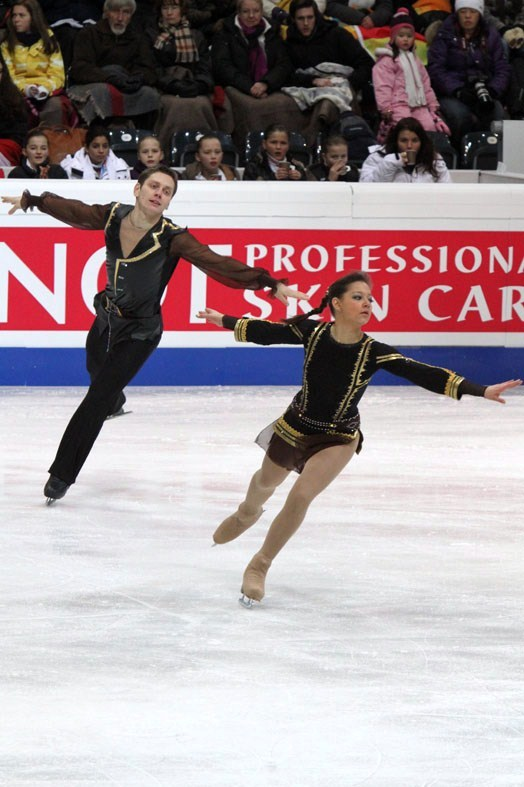
Bakirova/Kamianchuk at the 2011 European Championships

Kamianchuk began learning to skate in 1992. He switched from singles to pairs when he was 16 years old.

Kamianchuk teamed up with Russia's Lubov Bakirova in 2009. Appearing at six ISU Championships, the two achieved their best result, 10th, at the 2011 Europeans in Bern and the 2012 Europeans in Sheffield. They competed together until the end of the 2011−12 season.

=== Partnership with Danilova ===
Kamianchuk returned to competition in 2014–15, partnered with Russia's Tatiana Danilova. Making their debut as a pair, they placed 6th at the CS Golden Spin of Zagreb in December 2014. They won the silver medal at the Toruń Cup in January 2015. They were second at the Belarusian Championships behind Maria Paliakova / Nikita Bochkov.

Danilova/Kamianchuk finished 10th at the 2016 European Championships in Bratislava and 20th at the 2016 World Championships in Boston, coached by Dmitri Kaplun in Minsk.

The pair placed 10th at the 2017 European Championships in Ostrava. They placed 23rd at the 2017 World Championships in Helsinki.

== Programs ==
=== With Danilova ===
Season	Short program	Free skating
2016–18	Sherlock Holmes by Hans Zimmer	Game of Thrones by Ramin Djawadi
2015–16	Don Juan	Notre-Dame de Paris by Riccardo Cocciante

=== With Bakirova ===
Season	Short program	Free skating
2011–12	Ziganotchka (Russian Gypsy music) by Paul Mauriat	The Barber of Siberia by Eduard Artemyev
2009–11	Polovtsian Dances (from Prince Igor) by Alexander Borodin	Pirates of the Caribbean by Klaus Badelt, Hans Zimmer

== Competitive highlights ==
CS: Challenger Series

=== With Danilova ===
International
Event	2014–15	2015–16	2016–17	2017–18
World Champ.		20th	23rd	
European Champ.		10th	10th	
CS Golden Spin of Zagreb	6th		8th	
CS Mordovian Ornament		5th		
CS Nebelhorn Trophy				12th
CS Warsaw Cup		4th	6th	
Toruń Cup	2nd			
National
Belarusian Champ.	2nd	1st	1st	

=== With Bakirova ===
International
Event	2009–10	2010–11	2011–12
World Champ.	19th	19th	21st
European Champ.	17th	10th	10th
Nebelhorn Trophy		8th	
NRW Trophy		7th	2nd
Warsaw Cup			2nd
National
Belarusian Champ.	1st	1st	1st
