= Vasilisa Kaganovskaia =

Russian ice dancer

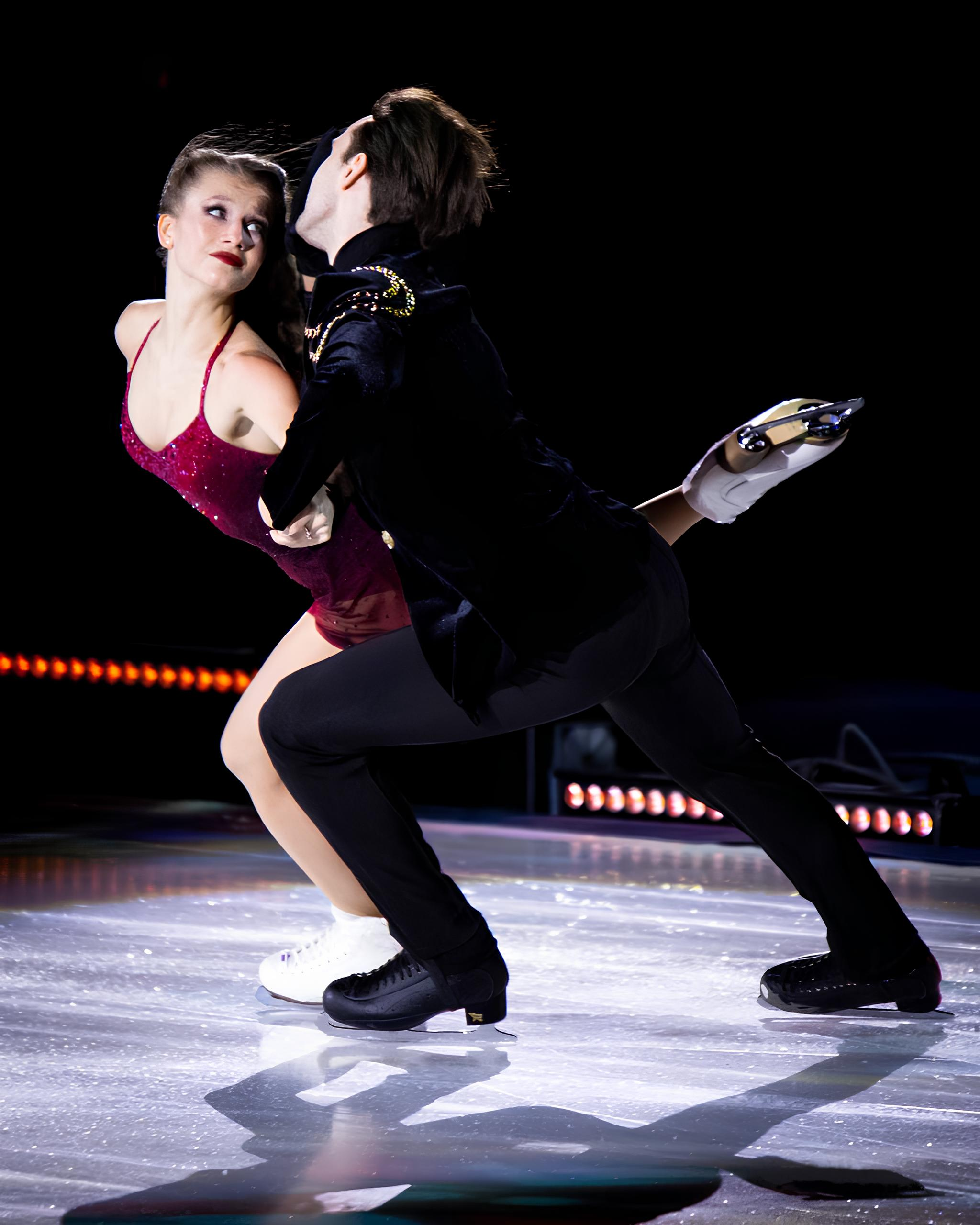
- Kaganovskaia and Nekrasov in 2024

Personal information
- Native name: Василиса Алексеевна Каганoвская
- Full name: Vasilisa Alexeevna Kaganovskaia
- Born: 14 October 2005 (age 21) Saint Petersburg, Russia
- Height: 1.58 m (5 ft 2 in)

Figure skating career
- Country: (Individual Neutral Athletes) Individual Neutral Athlete; Russia
- Discipline: Ice dance
- Partner: Maxim Nekrasov
- Coach: Anjelika Krylova, Alexei Gorshkov, Ekaterina Ryazanova
- Skating club: Megasport SC
- Began skating: 2008
Medal record
Representing Russia
Figure skating: Ice dance
Russian Championships
Silver medal – second place	2026 Saint Petersburg	Ice dance

Vasilisa Alexeevna Kaganovskaia (Russian: Василиса Алексеевна Каганoвская; also spelled Kaganovskaya, born 14 October 2005) is a Russian competitive ice dancer who currently competes as an Individual Neutral Athlete. With her former skating partner, Valeriy Angelopol, she won two medals on the ISU Junior Grand Prix, including a gold medal in 2021 Slovenia. With her current skating partner, Maxim Nekrasov, she is the 2026 Russian Figure Skating Championships silver medalist.

== Personal life ==
Vasilisa Alexeevna Kaganovskaia was born on 14 October 2005 in Saint Petersburg, Russia. She has a younger brother.

== Career ==
=== Early career ===
Kaganovskaia started skating in 2008. Until 2018 she trained in Saint Petersburg under Denis Lunin, competing with Ilya Vladimirov.

=== 2018–2023: Partnership with Valeriy Angelopol ===
In 2018 she teamed up with Valeriy Angelopol; they were coached by Anjelika Krylova.

In March 2021, Kaganovskaia and Angelopol took part in the Russian Junior Cup Final. With a score of 171.38, they won the silver medal.

=== 2021–2022 season ===
In 2021 Kaganovskaia/Angelopol made their international junior debut. In September they competed in the ISU Junior Grand Prix in Košice, where they placed second. Later that month they took part in the Junior Grand Prix event in Ljubljana and, with a total score of 167.22, they won the competition, qualifying for the 2021–2022 JGP Final. However the event, which was scheduled to take place in Osaka in December 2021, was cancelled due to the COVID-19 pandemic.

In October they competed at the Denis Ten Memorial; they placed first both in the rhythm dance and the free dance and, with a total score of 170.94, won the junior event.

In January 2022, they competed at the Russian Junior Championship. After the rhythm dance Kaganovskaia/Angelopol were in first place with 72.81 points. In the free dance they placed second with a score of 109.11, finishing second overall. A month later, they won the Russian Junior Cup Final, placing first in both the rhythm dance and the free dance, with a total score of 179.20.

=== 2022–2023 season ===
In October 2022 Kaganovskaia/Angelopol made their senior debut at the first stage of the Russian Grand Prix in Moscow, where they placed second. In November, they competed at the fourth stage of the Russian Grand Prix. They placed first in the rhythm dance and, maintaining their lead in the free dance, won the event with a score of 198.59. In December they were scheduled to compete at the Russian Championship in Krasnoyarsk, but were forced to withdraw due to Vasilisa's illness. Thanks to their previous placements, they qualified for the Russian Grand Prix Final, held in Saint Petersburg in March 2023, where they placed first.

In August 2023 it was announced that Kaganovskaia/Angelopol had ended their partnership "by mutual decision of the partners".

=== 2023–2024 season: Partnership with Maxim Nekrasov ===
In September 2023 Kaganovskaia teamed up with Maxim Nekrasov and began training under Anjelika Krylova and Alexei Gorshkov. During this season, Kaganovskaia/Nekrasov did not compete in official events and appeared only in exhibitions and ice shows.

=== 2024–2025 season ===
In October 2024, Kaganovskaia/Nekrasov made their debut at the N.A. Panin-Kolomenkin Memorial. The following month they competed in the third and fifth stages of the Russian Grand Prix, winning silver medals at both events.

In December they competed at the Russian Championship, where they placed fourth. In February they took part in the Russian Grand Prix Final, winning the gold medal.

=== 2025–2026 season: Silver national medalists ===
In the lead-up to the 2026 Winter Olympics in Milano-Cortina, Kaganovskaia and Nekrasov were reportedly considered substitute candidates for participation under the Individual Neutral Athletes (AIN) by the Russian Figure Skating Federation, as Russia remained banned from competing in international competitions by the ISU. The primary candidates from their discipline, Alexandra Stepanova and Ivan Bukin, were ultimately not granted neutral status. As a result of the ISU Rules, the quota place was not reassigned, and Kaganovskaia and Nekrasov were not considered for Olympic Participation.

Kaganovskaia/Nekrasov placed first and second at stages of the Russian Grand Prix.

In December, at the Russian Championships in Saint Petersburg, they won the silver medal, finishing behind only Alexandra Stepanova and Ivan Bukin.

In March they participated in the Russian Grand Prix Final, placing second in the rhythm dance, second in the free dance and second overall.

=== 2026–2027: International Senior Debut ===
On 30 June 2026, the International Skating Union announced that figure skaters from Russia and Belarus would be allowed to compete at international competitions as Individual Neutral Athletes (AINs). Each of these skaters are required to undergo an individual assessment conducted by the ISU Council to determine whether they meet the criteria for neutral status. Kaganovskaia/Nekrasov's applications were approved, allowing them to compete internationally as a neutral athletes.

The pair opened their season at the 2026 Kinoshita Group Cup, earning themselves the silver medal overall.

== Programs ==
=== With Nekrasov ===
Season	Rhythm dance	Free dance	Exhibition
2026–2027	Elegie produced by AI; Danse Macabre by Sephira	Plan & Elevation: IV. The Orangery by Attacca Quartet; Fratres For Violin String Orchestra and Percussion by Arvo Part; Outro by M83	No Time to Die by Billie Eilish
2025–2026	Breathe by The Prodigy; Angel by Massive Attack; Firestarter by The Prodigy	Rain, In your Black Eyes by Ezio Bosso	No Time to Die by Billie Eilish; Please Be A Little Weaker (Будь пожалуйста послабее) by Alexey Vorobyov; Harley Quinn and Joker; The Phantom of the Opera by Andrew Lloyd Webber
2024–2025	Trouble; Fever by Elvis Presley; Tutti Frutti by Les Greenes	Moonlight Sonata by Ludwig van Beethoven	The Master and Margarita by Igor Kornelyuk; I Don't Believe You (Я тебе не верю) by Grigory Leps and Irina Allegrova; Please Be A Little Weaker (Будь пожалуйста послабее) by Alexey Vorobyov; Venom; Harley Quinn and Joker

=== With Angelopol ===
Season	Rhythm Dance	Free Dance	Exhibition
2022–2023	Con Calma by Daddy Yankee ft. Snow; Adicto by Prince Royce ft. Mark Anthony; The Anthem by Pitbull ft. Lil Jon	Roxane's Dance; Eastern Path; The Charge (from the "Alexander" soundtrack)	Gangnam Style by PSY; One Desire by Jakarta; Синий платочек by Jerzy Petersburski
2021–2022	In the End Tommee Profitt Remix; Lose Yourself by Eminem	Ave Maria by Vladimir Fëdorovič Vavilov	

== Competitive Highlights ==
=== Skating as an Individual Neutral Athlete ===
With Nekrasov

International
Event	26-27
CS Kinoshita Group Cup	2nd
CS Denis Ten Memorial	2nd

=== Skating for Russia ===
==== With Nekrasov ====
National
Event	24-25	25-26	26-27
Russian Champ.	4th	2nd	
Russian GP Final	1st	2nd	
Russian GP Stage 1		1st	
Russian GP Stage 2		2nd	1st
Russian GP Stage 3	2nd		
Russian GP Stage 5	2nd		1st
N.A. Panin Memorial	1st	1st	
F.A. Klimov Comp.	1st		

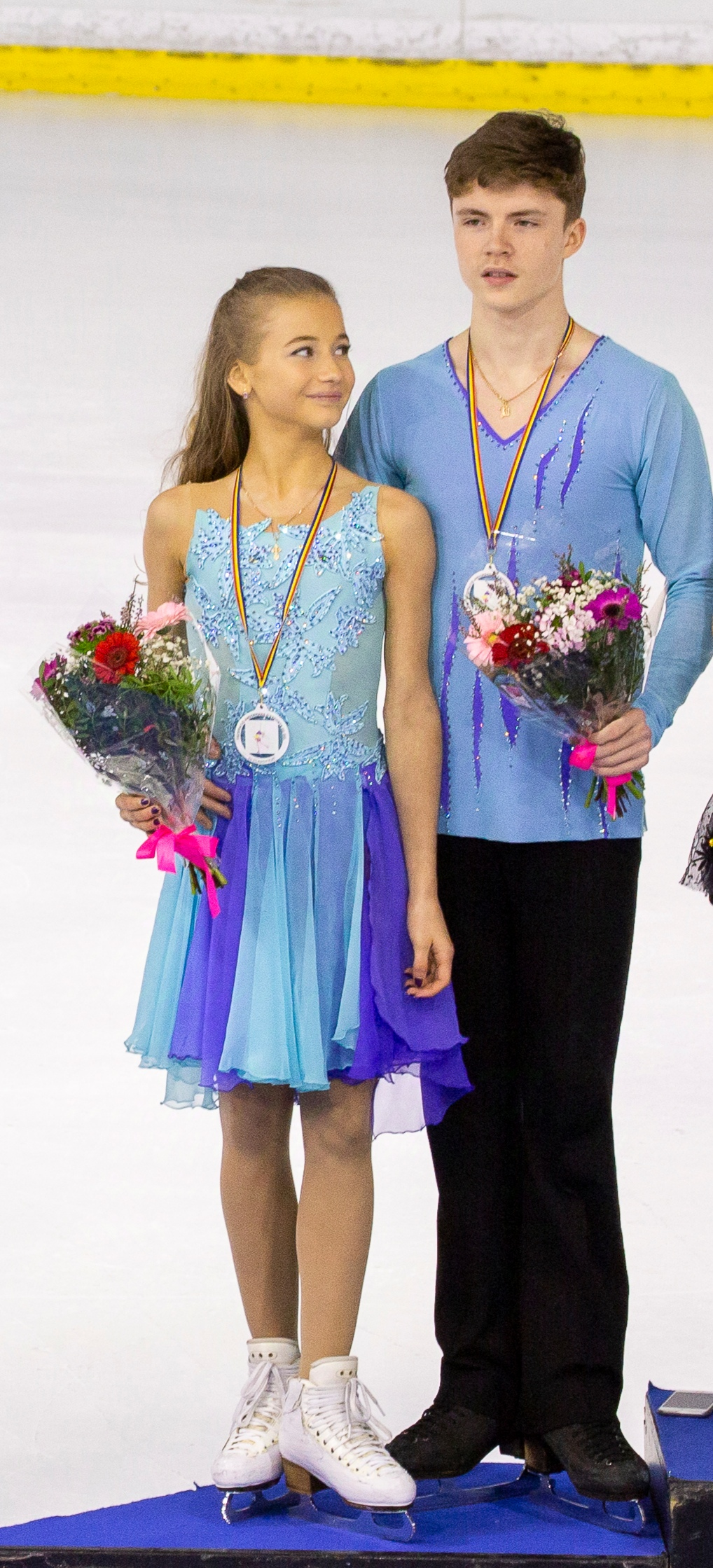
Kaganovskaia/Angelopol at the Open d'Andorra 2019

==== With Angelopol ====
International
Event	19-20	20-21	21-22	22-23
Denis Ten Memorial			1st	
Open d’Andorra	2nd			
Mezzaluna Cup	2nd			
JGP Final			C	
JGP Slovakia			2nd	
JGP Slovenia			1st	
Grand Prix of Bratislava	1st			
National
Event	19-20	20-21	21-22	22-23
Russian Champ.				WD
Russian Jr. Champ.	11th	7th	2nd	
Russian GP Final				1st
Russian Junior GP Final		2nd	1st	
Russian Junior GP Stage 2		2nd		
Russian Junior GP Stage 4		2nd		
Russian Junior GP Stage 5			1st	
Russian GP Stage 1				2nd
Russian GP Stage 4				1st

== Detailed results ==
With Nekrasov

2026–2027 season
Date	Event	Level	RD	FD	Total
13–16 November 2026	2026 Russian Grand Prix, 5th Stage	Senior	1 81.76	1 121.12	1 202.88
23–26 October 2026	2026 Russian Grand Prix, 2nd Stage	Senior	1 81.48	1 121.55	1 203.03
07–11 October 2026	2026 CS Denis Ten Memorial	Senior	3 74.28	2 112.92	2 187.20
04–6 September 2026	2026 CS Kinoshita Group Cup	Senior	2 74.21	1 110.60	2 184.81
2025–2026 season
Date	Event	Level	RD	FD	Total
06–9 March 2026	2025 Russian Grand Prix Final	Senior	2 87.61	2 128.44	2 216.05
17–22 December 2025	2026 Russian Championships	Senior	2 84.82	2 126.62	2 211.44
01–4 November 2025	2025 Russian Grand Prix, 2nd Stage	Senior	2 80.87	2 123.67	2 204.54
24–26 October 2025	2025 Russian Grand Prix, 1st Stage	Senior	2 74.30	1 123.66	1 197.96
08–12 October 2025	2025 N.A. Panin-Kolomenkin Memorial	Senior	1 78.74	1 116.42	1 195.16
2024–2025 season
Date	Event	Level	RD	FD	Total
13–17 February 2025	2024 Russian Grand Prix Final	Senior	1 81.51	1 124.07	1 205.58
18–23 December 2024	2025 Russian Championships	Senior	5 79.72	4 123.04	4 202.76
02–4 December 2024	2024 F.A. Klimov Competition	Senior	1 82.37	1 124.35	1 206.72
22–25 November 2024	2024 Russian Grand Prix, 5th Stage	Senior	1 82.28	2 123.46	2 205.74
08–11 November 2024	2024 Russian Grand Prix, 3rd Stage	Senior	2 79.81	2 121.12	2 200.93
01–5 October 2024	2024 N.A. Panin-Kolomenkin Memorial	Senior	1 82.18	1 119.33	1 201.51
