= Maxim Nekrasov =

Russian ice dancer (born 2000)

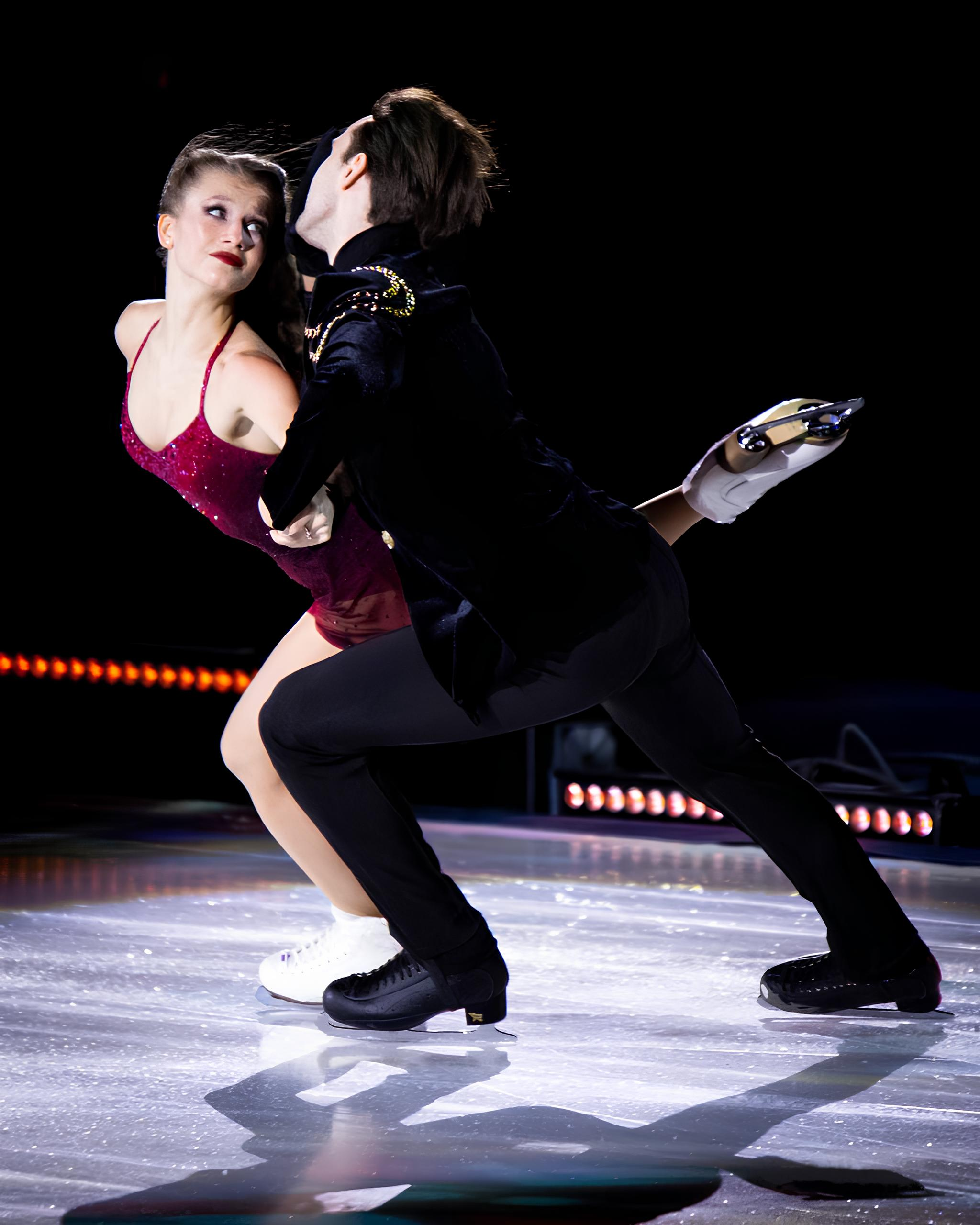
- Vasilisa Kaganovskaia and Nekrasov in 2024

Personal information
- Native name: Максим Александрович Некрасов
- Full name: Maxim Alexandrovich Nekrasov
- Born: 27 September 2000 (age 26) Odintsovo, Moscow Oblast, Russia
- Height: 1.83 m (6 ft 0 in)

Figure skating career
- Country: (Individual Neutral Athletes) Individual Neutral Athlete; Russia
- Partner: Vasilisa Kaganovskaia
- Coach: Alexei Gorshkov, Anjelika Krylova, Ekaterina Ryazanova
- Skating club: Megasport SC
- Began skating: 2004
Medal record
Representing Russia (with Kaganovskaia)
Figure skating: Ice dancing
Russian Championships
Silver medal – second place	2026 Saint Petersburg	Ice dance
Representing Russia (with Ushakova)
World Junior Championships
Bronze medal – third place	2018 Sofia	Ice dancing
Junior Grand Prix Final
Silver medal – second place	2018–19 Vancouver	Ice dancing

Maxim Alexandrovich Nekrasov (Russian: Максим Александрович Некрасов, born 27 September 2000) is a Russian competitive ice dancer who currently competes as an Individual Neutral Athlete. With his former skating partner, Arina Ushakova, he is the 2018 World Junior bronze medalist and 2018–19 Junior Grand Prix Final silver medalist. He has also won six medals on the ISU Junior Grand Prix series, including gold medals in 2017 Italy, 2018 Lithuania and 2018 Armenia.

== Personal life ==
Maxim Alexandrovich Nekrasov was born on 27 September 2000 in Odintsovo, Russia.

== Career ==
=== Early career ===
Nekrasov began learning to skate in 2004. He trained as a single skater until 2010; he then switched to ice dancing. He and his first partner, Polina Velikanova, competed together during the 2011–2012 season. He skated the following season with Maria Oleynik.

Nekrasov and Polina Kalinina skated two seasons together, 2013–2014 and 2014–2015. In 2015, he teamed up with Arina Ushakova. They were coached by Alexei Gorshkov and Maxim Bolotin.

=== 2016–2017 season ===
Ushakova/Nekrasov received their first ISU Junior Grand Prix (JGP) assignments in the 2016–2017 season. They won bronze medals at both events, competing in late August in Ostrava, Czech Republic and in October in Dresden, Germany.

In November 2016, they won the silver medal at the 2016 Ice Star. They placed seventh at the 2017 Russian Junior Championships.

=== 2017–2018 season ===
Competing in the 2017 JGP series, Ushakova/Nekrasov took bronze in August in Minsk, Belarus. They won their first JGP gold medal in October at the event in Egna, Italy, beating the silver medalists, their teammates Polishchuk/Vakhnov, by about two points. With these results they qualified for the 2017–18 JGP Final, where they placed fifth.

In January 2018, Ushakova/Nekrasov took the bronze medal at the 2018 Russian Junior Championships after placing fifth in the short dance and third in the free dance. In March, they won bronze at the 2018 World Junior Championships in Sofia, Bulgaria, having placed third in both segments.

=== 2018–2019 season ===
Ushakova/Nekrasov started their season by competing in the 2018 JGP series. At their first JGP event of the season, they won the gold medal in Kaunas, Lithuania. They were ranked first in both the rhythm dance and the free dance and won the gold medal by a margin of more than 6 points over the silver medalists, Nguyen/Kolesnik. Their rhythm dance, free dance and combined total scores at that competition were the highest scores achieved in an international junior ice dance competition at the time, though since surpassed.

At their second JGP event of the season, they won another gold medal, now in Yerevan, Armenia. Again they were ranked first in both the short program and the free skate. Ushakova/Nekrasov also upgraded their earlier short program, free skate, and combined total World record scores. With two JGP gold medals, they qualified for the 2018–19 Junior Grand Prix Final. At the Final, Ushakova/Nekrasov won the silver medal after placing second in the rhythm dance and first in the free dance. They were part of a Russian sweep of the ice dance podium. Ushakova/Nekrasov beat the bronze medalists, Khudaiberdieva/Nazarov, by about 6 points, but the race for the gold medal was extremely tight. The gold medalists, Shevchenko/Eremenko, beat Ushakova/Nekrasov by a margin of only 0.01 points.

Following the Final, Ushakova/Nekrasov were again defeated by Shevchenko/Eremenko at the 2019 Russian Junior Championships, winning the silver medal after second-place finishes in both segments. They won the 2019 Open Ice Mall Cup in late February.

Their final event of the season was the 2019 World Junior Championships, where they unexpectedly placed fourth in the rhythm dance after hitting only two of the eight key points on the tango pattern dance. They dropped to fifth place overall after placing fifth in the free dance.

=== 2019–2020 season ===
Ushakova/Nekrasov missed the first half of the season, including the Junior Grand Prix, due to Nekrasov undergoing and recovering from leg surgery. They returned to competition with a victory at the Golden Spin of Zagreb and then competed at the Russian Junior Championships, where they placed second behind Shanaeva/Naryzhnyy. Their silver medal at junior nationals led to their being assigned to compete at the 2020 World Junior Championships in Tallinn, Estonia. They placed fourth in the rhythm dance, hitting only three of the eight key points on the Teatime Foxtrot pattern dance. Fourth in the free dance, they finished fourth overall.

=== 2020–2021 season ===
With the COVID-19 pandemic resulting in the cancellation of the international junior season, Ushakova/Nekrasov competed exclusively domestically. In their final junior event, they won the gold medal at the 2021 Russian Junior Championships.

=== 2021–2022 season ===
Ushakova and Nekrasov moved to the senior level. They withdrew from the Russian test skates, citing medical reasons. It was subsequently reported that Ushakova had contracted COVID-19.

Appearing at their first senior Russian championships, Ushakova/Nekrasov placed seventh.

=== 2022–2023 season ===
In 2022, Nekrasov teamed up with Elizaveta Pasechnik. Together they won a bronze and a silver medal at stages of the Russian Grand Prix and placed third at the Russian Championships.

=== 2023–2024 season ===
In September 2023 Nekrasov teamed up with Vasilisa Kaganovskaia and began training under Alexei Gorshkov and Anjelika Krylova. During this season, Kaganovskaia/Nekrasov did not compete in official events and appeared only in exhibitions and ice shows.

=== 2024–2025 season ===
In October 2024, Kaganovskaia/Nekrasov made their debut at the N.A. Panin-Kolomenkin Memorial. The following month they competed in the third and fifth stages of the Russian Grand Prix, winning silver medals at both events.

In December they competed at the Russian Championship, where they placed fourth. In February they took part in the Russian Grand Prix Final, winning the gold medal.

=== 2025–2026 season: Silver national medalists ===
In the lead-up to the 2026 Winter Olympics in Milano-Cortina, Kaganovskaia and Nekrasov were reportedly considered substitute candidates for participation under the Individual Neutral Athletes (AIN) by the Russian Figure Skating Federation, as Russia remained banned from competing in international competitions by the ISU. The primary candidates from their discipline, Alexandra Stepanova and Ivan Bukin, were ultimately not granted neutral status. As a result of the ISU Rules, the quota place was not reassigned, and Kaganovskaia and Nekrasov were not considered for Olympic Participation.

Kaganovskaia/Nekrasov placed first and second at stages of the Russian Grand Prix.

In December, at the Russian Championships in Saint Petersburg, they won the silver medal, finishing behind only Alexandra Stepanova and Ivan Bukin.

In March they participated in the Russian Grand Prix Final, placing second in the rhythm dance, second in the free dance and second overall.

=== 2026–2027 season ===
On 30 June 2026, the International Skating Union announced that figure skaters from Russia and Belarus would be allowed to compete at international competitions as Individual Neutral Athletes (AINs). Each of these skaters are be required to undergo an individual assessment conducted by the ISU Council to determine whether they meet the criteria for neutral status. Nekrasov's application was approved, making him eligible to compete internationally as a neutral athlete.

The pair opened their season at the 2026 Kinoshita Group Cup, earning themselves the silver medal overall.

== Programs ==
=== With Kaganovskaia ===
Season	Rhythm dance	Free dance	Exhibition
2026–2027	Elegie produced by AI; Danse Macabre by Sephira	Plan & Elevation: IV. The Orangery by Attacca Quartet; Fratres For Violin String Orchestra and Percussion by Arvo Part; Outro by M83	No Time to Die by Billie Eilish
2025–2026	Breathe by The Prodigy; Angel by Massive Attack; Firestarter by The Prodigy	Rain, In your Black Eyes by Ezio Bosso	No Time to Die by Billie Eilish; Please Be A Little Weaker (Будь пожалуйста послабее) by Alexey Vorobyov; Harley Quinn and Joker (Харли Квин и Джокер); The Phantom of the Opera by Andrew Lloyd Webber
2024–2025	Trouble; Fever by Elvis Presley; Tutti Frutti by Les Greenes	Moonlight Sonata by Ludwig van Beethoven	The Master and Margarita by Igor Kornelyuk; I Don't Believe You (Я тебе не верю) by Grigory Leps and Irina Allegrova; Please Be A Little Weaker (Будь пожалуйста послабее) by Alexey Vorobyov; Venom; Harley Quinn and Joker (Харли Квин и Джокер)

=== With Pasechnik ===
Season	Rhythm dance	Free dance	Exhibition
2022–2023	Paxi Ni Ngongo by Bonga; Gasolina by Daddy Yankee, feat. Glory	Dark conscience by Tommee Profitt; Mad World by 2WEI, feat. Tommee Profitt and Fleurie	

=== With Ushakova ===
Season	Rhythm dance	Free dance	Exhibition
2020–2021	Charleston, Foxtrot, Swing: All That Jazz (from Chicago) by John Kander & Fred Ebb performed by Catherine Zeta-Jones	Kill Bill soundtrack	
2019–2020	Charleston, Foxtrot, Swing: All That Jazz (from Chicago) by John Kander & Fred Ebb performed by Catherine Zeta-Jones	Milord performed by Édith Piaf	
2018–2019	Tango: Libertango by Astor Piazzolla performed by Bond; Flamenco: Flamenco by Valeri Dolgin	Black Cat, White Cat performed by Goran Bregović	
	Short dance		
2017–2018	Cha cha: Chilly Cha Cha; Rhumba: Love the Way You Lie; Salsa: Cuba	Be Italian (from Nine) performed by Fergie	Confessa by Adriano Celentano
2016–2017	Blues: Natural Blues by Paolo Nutini; Hip hop: Let Me Clear My Throat by DJ Kool	The Gypsies of Nagyida by Imre Czomba	
2015–2016	Starlight Waltz: Libiamo ne' lieti calici from La traviata by Giuseppe Verdi	Chicago by John Kander, Fred Ebb; Nowadays; All That Jazz	

=== With Kalinina ===
Season	Short dance	Free dance
2014–2015		Chaplin medley

== Records and achievements ==
(with Ushakova)

- Set the junior-level ice dancing record of the new +5 / -5 GOE (Grade of Execution) system for the combined total (168.17 points), rhythm dance (67.63 points) and free dance (100.54 points) at the 2018 JGP Lithuania.
- They became the first junior team to score above 100 points in the free dance at the 2018 JGP Lithuania.
- Upgraded their junior-level ice dancing record for the combined total (172.81 points), rhythm dance (69.18 points) and free dance (103.63 points) at the 2018 JGP Armenia.
- They became the first junior team to score above 170 points at the 2018 JGP Armenia.

== Competitive highlights ==
JGP: Junior Grand Prix

=== Skating as an Individual Neutral Athlete ===
With Kaganovskaia

International
Event	26-27
CS Kinoshita Group Cup	2nd
CS Denis Ten Memorial	2nd

=== Skating for Russia ===
==== With Kaganovskaia ====
National
Event	24-25	25-26	26-27
Russian Champ.	4th	2nd	
Russian GP Final	1st	2nd	
Russian GP Stage 1		1st	
Russian GP Stage 2		2nd	1st
Russian GP Stage 3	2nd		
Russian GP Stage 5	2nd		1st
N.A. Panin Memorial	1st	1st	
F.A. Klimov Comp.	1st		

==== With Pasechnik ====
National
Event	22–23
Russian Champ.	3rd
Russian GP Stage 3	3rd
Russian GP Stage 6	2nd

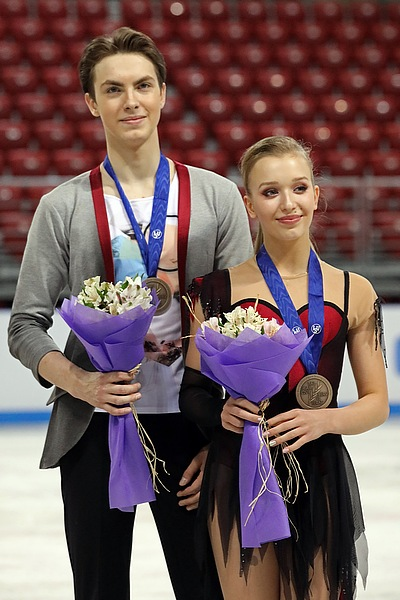
Ushakova/Nekrasov at the 2018 World Junior Championships

==== With Ushakova ====
International
Event	15–16	16–17	17–18	18–19	19–20	20–21	21–22
Junior Worlds			3rd	5th	4th		
JGP Final			5th	2nd			
JGP Armenia				1st			
JGP Belarus			3rd				
JGP Czech Republic		3rd					
JGP Germany		3rd					
JGP Italy			1st				
JGP Lithuania				1st			
Golden Spin					1st J		
Ice Star		2nd J					
Open Ice Mall Cup				1st J			
Tallinn Trophy	5th J						
National
Russian Champ.							7th
Russian Jr. Champ.		7th	3rd	2nd	2nd	1st	
J = Junior level; TBD = Assigned

==== With Velikanova, Oleynik, and Kalinina ====
Event	14–15 (PK)
National
Russian Cup 3	12th J
Russian Cup 4	9th J
J = Junior

== Detailed results ==
Small medals for short and free programs awarded only at ISU Championships.

With Kaganovskaia

2026–2027 season
Date	Event	Level	RD	FD	Total
13–16 November 2026	2026 Russian Grand Prix, 5th Stage	Senior	1 81.76	1 121.12	1 202.88
23–26 October 2026	2026 Russian Grand Prix, 2nd Stage	Senior	1 81.48	1 121.55	1 203.03
07–11 October 2026	2026 CS Denis Ten Memorial	Senior	3 74.28	2 112.92	2 187.20
04–6 September 2026	2026 CS Kinoshita Group Cup	Senior	2 74.21	1 110.60	2 184.81
2025–2026 season
Date	Event	Level	RD	FD	Total
06–09 March 2026	2025 Russian Grand Prix Final	Senior	2 87.61	2 128.44	2 216.05
17–22 December 2025	2026 Russian Championships	Senior	2 84.82	2 126.62	2 211.44
01–04 November 2025	2025 Russian Grand Prix, 2nd Stage	Senior	2 80.87	2 123.67	2 204.54
24–26 October 2025	2025 Russian Grand Prix, 1st Stage	Senior	2 74.30	1 123.66	1 197.96
08–12 October 2025	2025 N.A. Panin-Kolomenkin Memorial	Senior	1 78.74	1 116.42	1 195.16
2024–2025 season
Date	Event	Level	RD	FD	Total
13–17 February 2025	2024 Russian Grand Prix Final	Senior	1 81.51	1 124.07	1 205.58
18–23 December 2024	2025 Russian Championships	Senior	5 79.72	4 123.04	4 202.76
02–04 December 2024	2024 F.A. Klimov Competition	Senior	1 82.37	1 124.35	1 206.72
22–25 November 2024	2024 Russian Grand Prix, 5th Stage	Senior	1 82.28	2 123.46	2 205.74
08–11 November 2024	2024 Russian Grand Prix, 3rd Stage	Senior	2 79.81	2 121.12	2 200.93
01–05 October 2024	2024 N.A. Panin-Kolomenkin Memorial	Senior	1 82.18	1 119.33	1 201.51

With Pasechnik

2022–2023 season
Date	Event	Level	RD	FD	Total
20–26 December 2022	2023 Russian Championships	Senior	3 79.48	3 116.04	3 195.52
25–28 November 2022	2022 Russian Grand Prix, 6th Stage	Senior	2 79.05	2 113.90	2 192.95
04–07 November 2022	2022 Russian Grand Prix, 3rd Stage	Senior	3 75.33	3 106.97	3 182.30

With Ushakova

2021–2022 season
Date	Event	Level	RD	FD	Total
21–26 December 2021	2022 Russian Championships	Senior	9; 70.27	7; 109.96	7; 180.23
2020–2021 season
Date	Event	Level	RD	FD	Total
1–5 February 2021	2021 Russian Junior Championships	Junior	1; 75.85	1; 111.70	1; 187.55
5–8 December 2020	2020 Cup of Russia Series, 5th Stage, Moscow domestic competition	Senior	1; 73.03	1; 112.79	1; 187.55
8–12 November 2020	2020 Cup of Russia Series, 4th Stage, Kazan domestic competition	Senior	1; 72.95	1; 111.03	1; 183.98
2019–2020 season
Date	Event	Level	RD	FD	Total
2–8 March 2020	2020 World Junior Championships	Junior	4; 66.97	4; 102.21	4; 169.18
4–8 February 2020	2020 Russian Junior championships	Junior	1; 71.37	2; 110.35	2; 181.72
4–7 December 2019	2019 Golden Spin of Zagreb	Junior	2; 62.34	1; 102.61	1; 164.95
2018–2019 season
Date	Event	Level	RD	FD	Total
4–10 March 2019	2019 World Junior Championships	Junior	4; 65.96	5; 100.52	5; 166.48
20–23 February 2019	2019 Open Ice Mall Cup	Junior	1; 75.15	1; 110.31	1; 185.46
1–4 February 2019	2019 Russian Junior Championships	Junior	2; 70.87	2; 109.93	2; 180.80
6–9 December 2018	2018–19 JGP Final	Junior	2; 67.49	1; 103.16	2; 170.65
10–13 October 2018	2018 JGP Armenia	Junior	1; 69.18	1; 103.63	1; 172.81
5–8 September 2018	2018 JGP Lithuania	Junior	1; 67.63	1; 100.54	1; 168.17
2017–2018 season
Date	Event	Level	SD	FD	Total
5–11 March 2018	2018 World Junior Championships	Junior	3; 61.29	3; 85.59	3; 146.88
23–26 January 2018	2018 Russian Junior Championships	Junior	5; 63.06	3; 90.21	3; 153.27
7–10 December 2017	2017–18 JGP Final	Junior	6; 58.53	5; 83.35	5; 141.88
11–14 October 2017	2017 JGP Italy	Junior	2; 61.07	1; 87.94	1; 149.01
20–24 September 2017	2017 JGP Belarus	Junior	3; 59.62	2; 83.32	3; 142.94
2016–2017 season
Date	Event	Level	SD	FD	Total
1–5 February 2017	2017 Russian Junior Championships	Junior	7; 55.99	8; 79.55	7; 135.54
18–20 November 2016	2016 Ice Star	Junior	2; 58.97	2; 89.57	2; 148.54
5–9 October 2016	2016 JGP Germany	Junior	4; 57.13	3; 83.08	3; 140.21
31 August – 4 September 2016	2016 JGP Czech Republic	Junior	3; 53.46	3; 82.64	3; 136.10
2015–2016 season
Date	Event	Level	SD	FD	Total
18–22 November 2015	2015 Tallinn Trophy	Junior	5; 51.47	5; 71.30	5; 122.77

World Junior Record Holders
Preceded by (Russia) Elizaveta Khudaiberdieva / Nikita Nazarov	Junior Rhythm Dance; 7 September 2018 – 7 March 2019	Succeeded by (Canada) Marjorie Lajoie / Zachary Lagha
Preceded by (Russia) Elizaveta Khudaiberdieva / Nikita Nazarov (Canada) Marjorie Lajoie / Zachary Lagha	Junior Free Dance; 8 September 2018 – 14 September 2018; 13 October 2018 – 9 March 2019	Succeeded by (Canada) Marjorie Lajoie / Zachary Lagha (Canada) Marjorie Lajoie / Zachary Lagha
Preceded by (Russia) Elizaveta Khudaiberdieva / Nikita Nazarov	Junior Ice Dance Total Score; 8 September 2018 – 9 March 2019	Succeeded by (Canada) Marjorie Lajoie / Zachary Lagha
