= Lubov Bakirova =

Russian pair skater (born 1993)

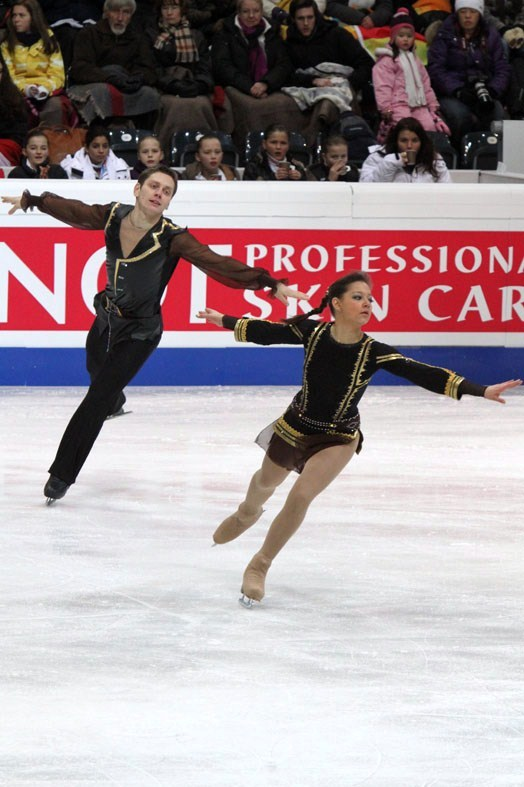
- Bakirova and Kamianchuk at the 2011 European Championships

Personal information
- Native name: Любовь Раифовна Бакирова
- Full name: Lubov Raifovna Bakirova
- Born: 11 January 1993 (age 33) Perm, Russia
- Height: 1.52 m (5 ft 0 in)

Figure skating career
- Country: Belarus
- Began skating: 2000
- Retired: 2012

Lubov Raifovna Bakirova (Russian: Любовь Раифовна Бакирова; born 11 January 1993) is a former Russian competitive pair skater. In 2009, she teamed up with Mikalai Kamianchuk to represent Belarus. Appearing at six ISU Championships, they achieved their best result, 10th, at the 2011 Europeans in Bern and the 2012 Europeans in Sheffield. They competed together until the end of the 2011−12 season.

== Programs ==
(with Kamianchuk)

Season	Short program	Free skating
2011–2012	Ziganotchka (Russian Gypsy music) by Paul Mauriat	The Barber of Siberia by Eduard Artemyev
2009–2011	Polovtsian Dances (from Prince Igor) by Alexander Borodin	Pirates of the Caribbean by Klaus Badelt, Hans Zimmer

== Competitive highlights ==
JGP: Junior Grand Prix

=== With Kamianchuk for Belarus ===
International
Event	2009–10	2010–11	2011–12
World Champ.	19th	19th	21st
European Champ.	17th	10th	10th
Nebelhorn Trophy		8th	
NRW Trophy		7th	2nd
Warsaw Cup			2nd
National
Belarusian Champ.	1st	1st	1st

=== With Patlasov for Russia ===
International
Event	2005–06	2006–07
JGP Czech Republic		4th
JGP Hungary		6th
National
Russian Championships		9th
Russian Junior Championships	13th	
