= Serguei Likhanski =

Soviet pair skater

Personal information
- Native name: Сергей Лиханский
- Other names: Sergei Likhanski

Figure skating career
- Country: Soviet Union
- Retired: 1985

Serguei Likhanski (Russian: Сергей Лиханский) is a former pair skater who competed for the Soviet Union. With skating partner Inna Bekker, he is a two-time World Junior medalist (silver in 1982, bronze in 1983) and the 1983 Nebelhorn Trophy champion. They were coached by Irina Rodnina in Moscow.

Likhanski moved to the United States after retiring from competition. As of 2014, he lives in Berkley, Michigan.

== Competitive highlights ==
(with Bekker)

International
Event	1980–81	1981–82	1982–83	1983–84	1984–85
Nebelhorn Trophy				1st	
Prague Skate				1st	
St. Ivel International					1st
Internat. St. Gervais				1st	
International: Junior
World Junior Champ.	4th	2nd	3rd		
