= Adeliia Petrosian =

Russian figure skater (born 2007)

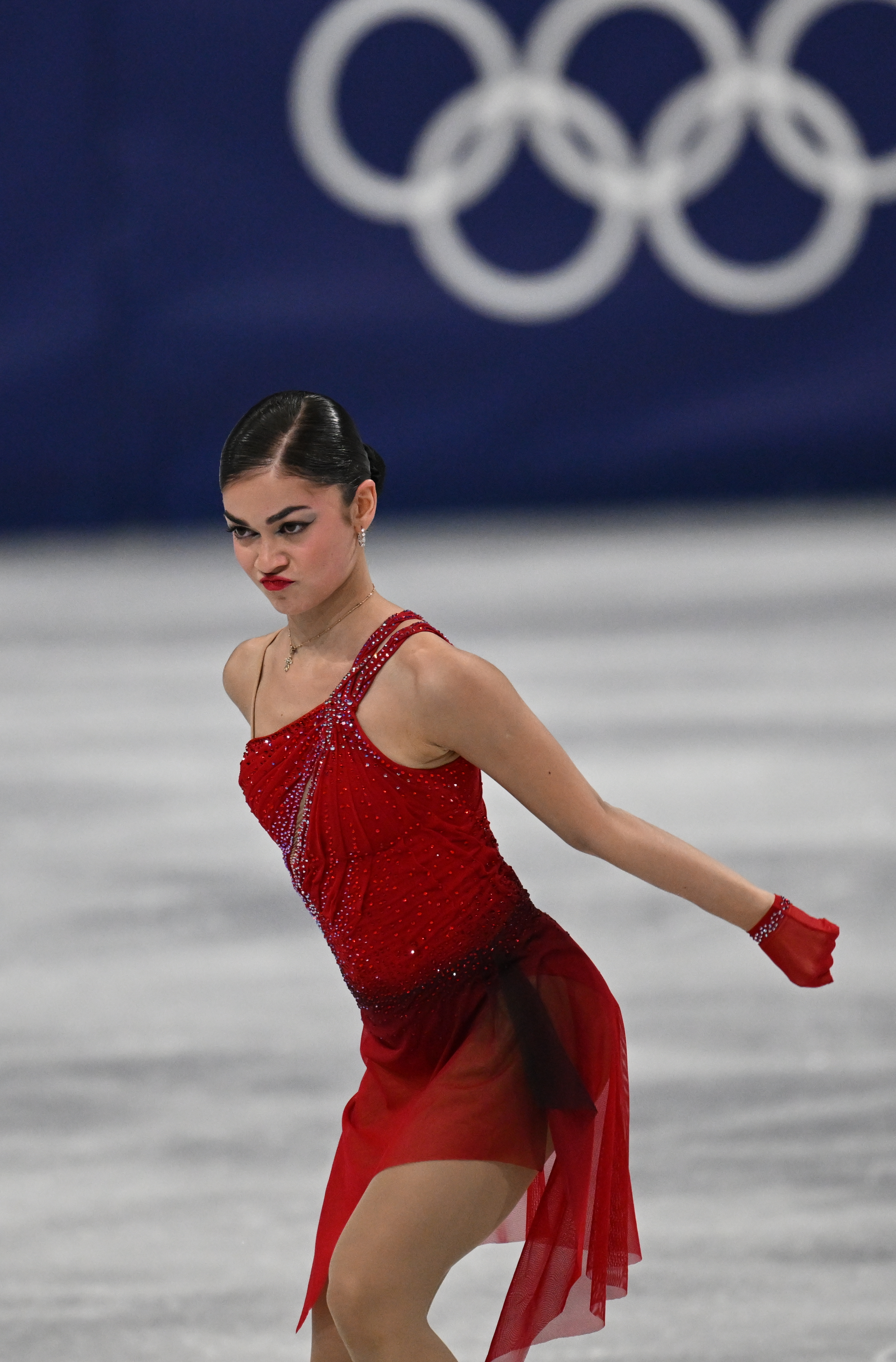
- Adeliia Petrosian performing her free skate at the 2026 Winter Olympics

Personal information
- Native name: Аделия Тиграновна Петросян
- Full name: Adeliia Tigranovna Petrosian
- Other names: Adelia / Adeliya; Petrosyan
- Born: 5 June 2007 (age 19) Moscow, Russia
- Height: 1.52 m (5 ft 0 in)

Figure skating career
- Country: (Individual Neutral Athletes) Individual Neutral Athlete; Russia
- Discipline: Women's singles
- Coach: Inna Goncharenko
- Began skating: 2011

Medal record
Russian Championships
| Gold medal – first place | 2024 Chelyabinsk | Singles |
| Gold medal – first place | 2025 Omsk | Singles |
| Gold medal – first place | 2026 Saint Petersburg | Singles |
| Bronze medal – third place | 2022 Saint Petersburg | Singles |

Adeliia Tigranovna Petrosian (Russian: Аделия Тиграновна Петросян; (Note: The я transliteration variants of her given name, Adeliya and Adelia, and the surname spelling variant, Petrosyan, also appear, see AllSkaters Staff (2026), op. cit.) born 5 June 2007) is a Russian figure skater who currently competes as an Individual Neutral Athlete (AIN). She is a three-time Russian national champion (2024, 2025, 2026) and a three-time Russian Grand Prix Final champion (2023, 2024, 2025). Internationally, she is the 2021 JGP Slovenia champion, the 2026 CS Trialeti Trophy silver medalist and the 2025 Skate to Milano champion.

She went undefeated in all domestic skating competitions during the 2023–2024 and the 2024–2025 seasons.

She competed at the 2026 Winter Olympics as an Individual Neutral Athlete.

== Personal life ==
Petrosian was born on 5 June 2007 in Moscow, Russia, to an Armenian father and a Russian mother. Her father works in the field of medicine. In addition to figure skating, Petrosian enjoys dance and is an avid fan of literature with Leo Tolstoy being amongst her favourite authors.

In 2025, Petrosian enrolled part-time in the Faculty of Choreography at the Russian Institute of Theatre Arts (GITIS) in Moscow, studying in the workshop of former Bolshoi Ballet principal dancer and choreographer Vyacheslav Gordeev.

== Career ==
=== Early years ===
Petrosian began learning how to skate in 2011 at the age of four. Her mother enrolled her at the Moskvich Rink, where she was coached by Irina Strakhova and Alexei Shemet. In early 2019, she tried out to join famed coach Eteri Tutberidze's group of skaters and was ultimately accepted.

=== 2019–20 season ===
Petrosian debuted as a junior on the 2019–20 Cup of Russia circuit. Her first event was the 2019 Russian Cup Stage I, Sysran, where she finished fourth in the short program, sixth in the free skate, and fifth overall. Petrosian then went on to win the bronze at the 2019 Russian Cup Stage II, Saransk behind teammate Sofia Akateva and Alina Gorbacheva. These results qualified her for the 2020 Russian Junior Championships, where she finished in sixth place overall.

In February, Petrosian competed at the 2020 Russian Cup Final, winning the bronze medal behind Sofia Samodelkina and Sofia Akateva.

=== 2020–21 season ===
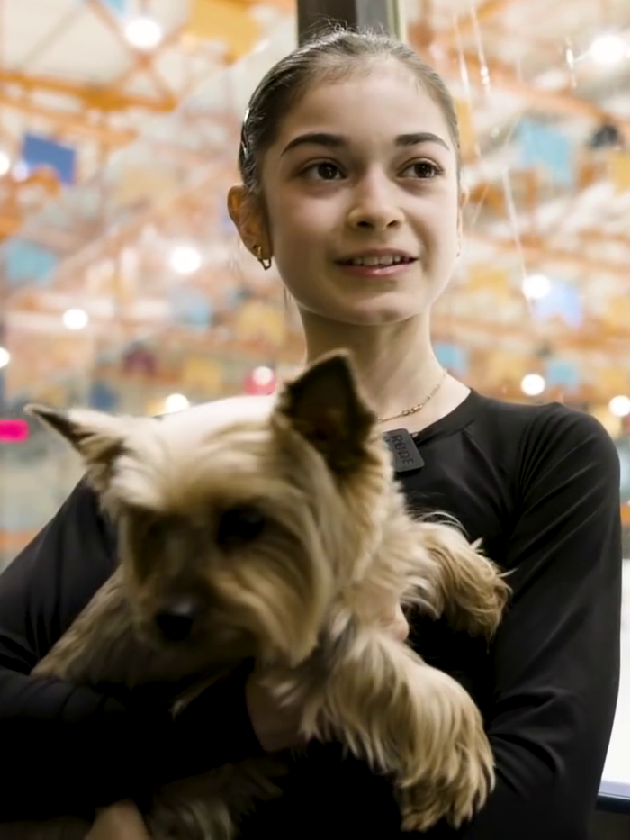
Petrosian in 2021

Petrosian would have been eligible to compete in the 2020–21 ISU Junior Grand Prix circuit; however, the series was canceled due to the global COVID-19 pandemic. She competed for another season in the junior division of the Cup of Russia circuit. In October, she won the gold medal at the 2020 Russian Cup Stage III, Sochi. At the 2020 Russian Cup Stage V, Moscow, she finished third in the short program, fifth in the free skate, and fourth overall. These results qualified her to the 2021 Russian Junior Championships. At the event, Petrosian won the silver medal overall behind her teammate, Sofia Akateva. In March, she competed at the 2021 Russian Cup Final, winning the bronze medal behind Akateva and Sofia Samodelkina.

=== 2021–22 season: Junior Grand Prix debut and national bronze medal ===
Petrosian was assigned to two events on the 2021–22 Junior Grand Prix series. She made her international junior debut in September at 2021 JGP Slovakia, placing third in both the short program and the free skate to take the bronze medal overall behind Russian compatriots, Veronika Zhilina and Sofia Muravieva. During her free skate performance, Petrosian attempted a quadruple toe loop but the jump was deemed to be underrotated. Later in the month, Petrosian competed at 2021 JGP Slovenia, where she won the short program and placed second in the free skate to win the gold medal overall.

Due to the COVID-19 pandemic, the International Skating Union announced an alternate qualifying procedure for the 2021–22 Junior Grand Prix Final which allowed each winner of the Junior Grand Prix events to qualify for the final as opposed to evaluating the results of each skater over two events. Therefore, Petrosian's gold medal at 2021 JGP Slovenia qualified her a spot for the 2021–22 Junior Grand Prix Final. The event was scheduled to be held in Osaka in December; however, the event was canceled due to the COVID-19 pandemic in Japan.

Petrosian went on to compete domestically as a senior on the 2021–22 Cup of Russia circuit, the qualifying series for the Russian Championships. At the 2021 Russian Cup Stage V, Perm, Petrosian attempted two quadruple loops, landing one of them in combination. She became first woman to land a quadruple loop in competition; however, because the jump was landed in a domestic competition, it could not be recognized officially by the International Skating Union. At that event, Petrosian ultimately won the silver medal in the event behind Sofia Muravieva.

In December, Petrosian competed at the 2022 Russian Championships. She placed sixth in the short program and third in the free skate, the latter of which included two cleanly landed quadruple loops. Although Petrosian originally finished fourth overall due to the event's winner, Kamila Valieva, later testing positive for doping, she was stripped of that national title in 2023 thus Petrosian was retroactively awarded the bronze medal.

The following month, Petrosian finished fifth at the 2022 Russian Junior Championships. She then closed her season by winning the silver medal on the junior level at the 2022 Russian Cup Final behind training mate, Sofia Akateva.

=== 2022–23 season: Russian Grand Prix Final Champion ===
Due to Russia's invasion of Ukraine, all Russian figure skaters were banned from competing international competition by the International Skating Union. Thus, Petrosian instead competed domestically on the Russian Grand Prix series (a series of all-Russian competitions in the same format as the international Grand Prix series). At the 2022 Russian Grand Prix II, Sochi, Petrosian won both segments of the competition and won the gold medal.

Going on to compete at the 2023 Russian Championships, Petrosian ranked in fifth place in the short program after falling on a planned triple Lutz. During the free skate, she fell on her opening quad loop attempt but cleanly landed two quad toe-loops, ranking third in the free skate segment and remaining fifth overall.

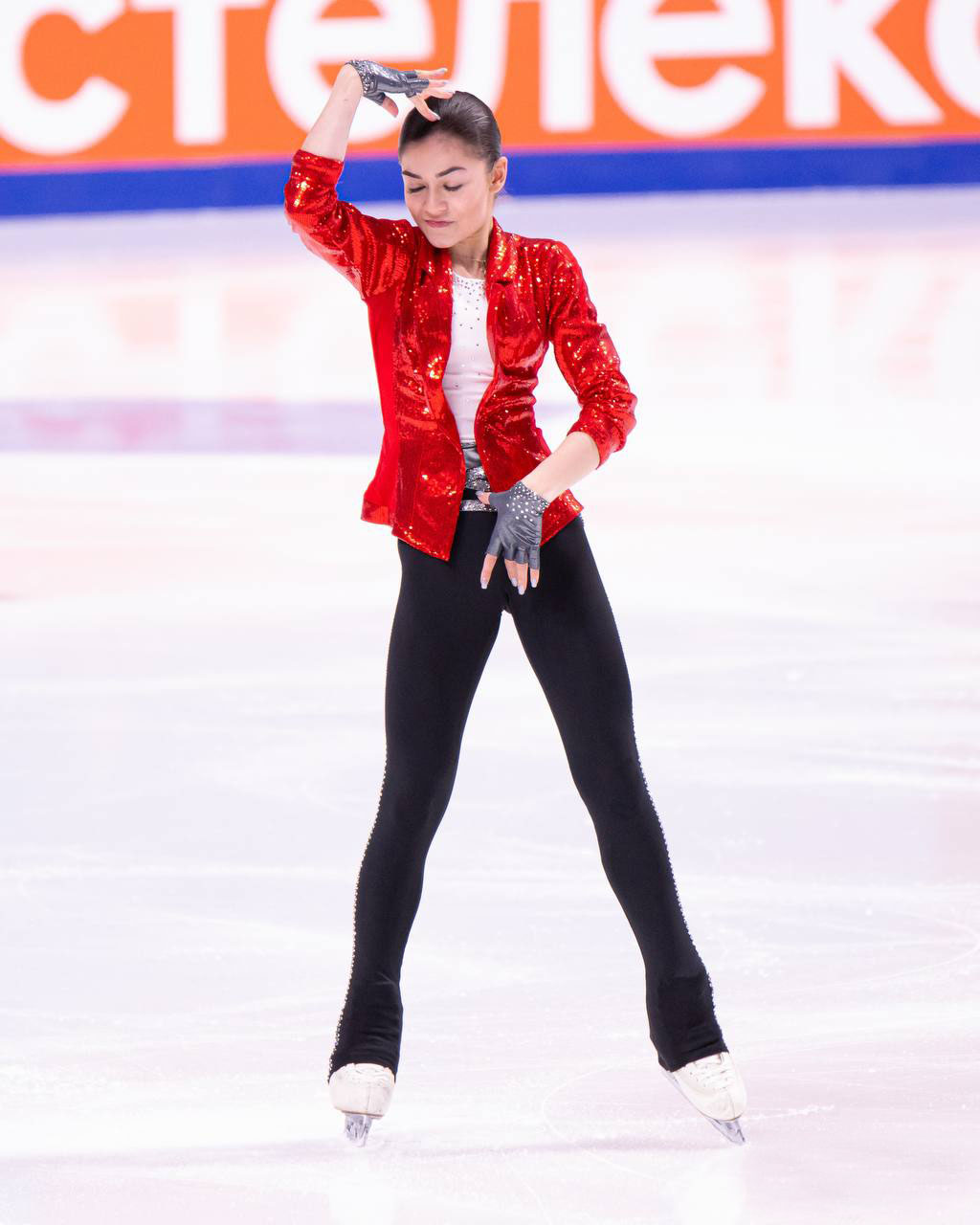
Petrosian at the 2024 Russian Championships

Petrosian's final competition of the season came at the 2023 Russian Grand Prix Final. She won the short program segment after landing all of her jumps cleanly, including a planned triple Axel. During the free skate she cleanly landed a quad flip and a quad toe-loop, although she stepped out off and out a hand down on her second quad toe-loop attempt and fell on a planned triple Axel. Despite the mistakes, Petrosian won the free skate segment to win the gold medal overall.

=== 2023–24 season: First national title ===
Petrosian began the season by winning gold at the 2023 Russian Grand Prix I, Ufa and the 2023 Russian Grand Prix II, Omsk, respectively.

In December, Petrosian won the gold medal 2024 Russian Championships. Two months later, she competed at the 2024 Russian Cup Grand Prix Final, winning the gold medal. The following month, she took the individual silver at the Russian Figure Skating Jumping Championships, behind Margarita Bazyliuk and ahead of Elena Kostyleva.

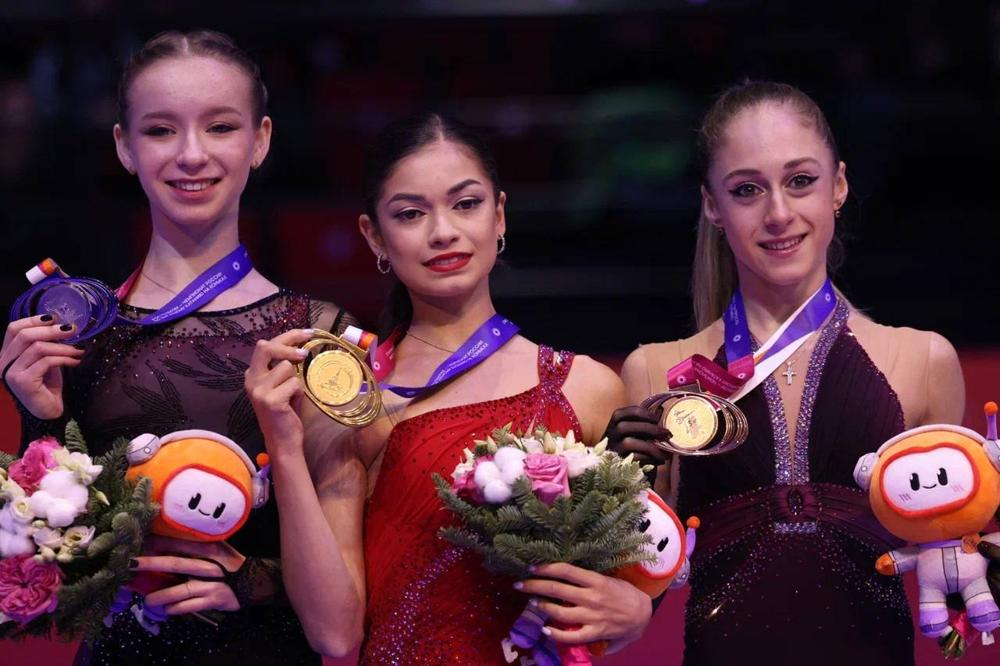
2025 Russian Championships medal ceremony; Petrosian (centre), Daria Sadkova (left), Alina Gorbacheva (right)

=== 2024–25 season: Second national title ===
Beginning the season at the 2024 Russian Grand Prix II, Kazan, Petrosian won the gold medal. Two weeks later, she repeated this result at the 2024 Russian Grand Prix IV, Moscow.

In December, Petrosian came in first at the 2025 Russian Championships. She subsequently went on to win gold at the 2025 Russian Grand Prix Final.

=== 2025–26 season: Milano Cortina Olympics and third consecutive national title ===
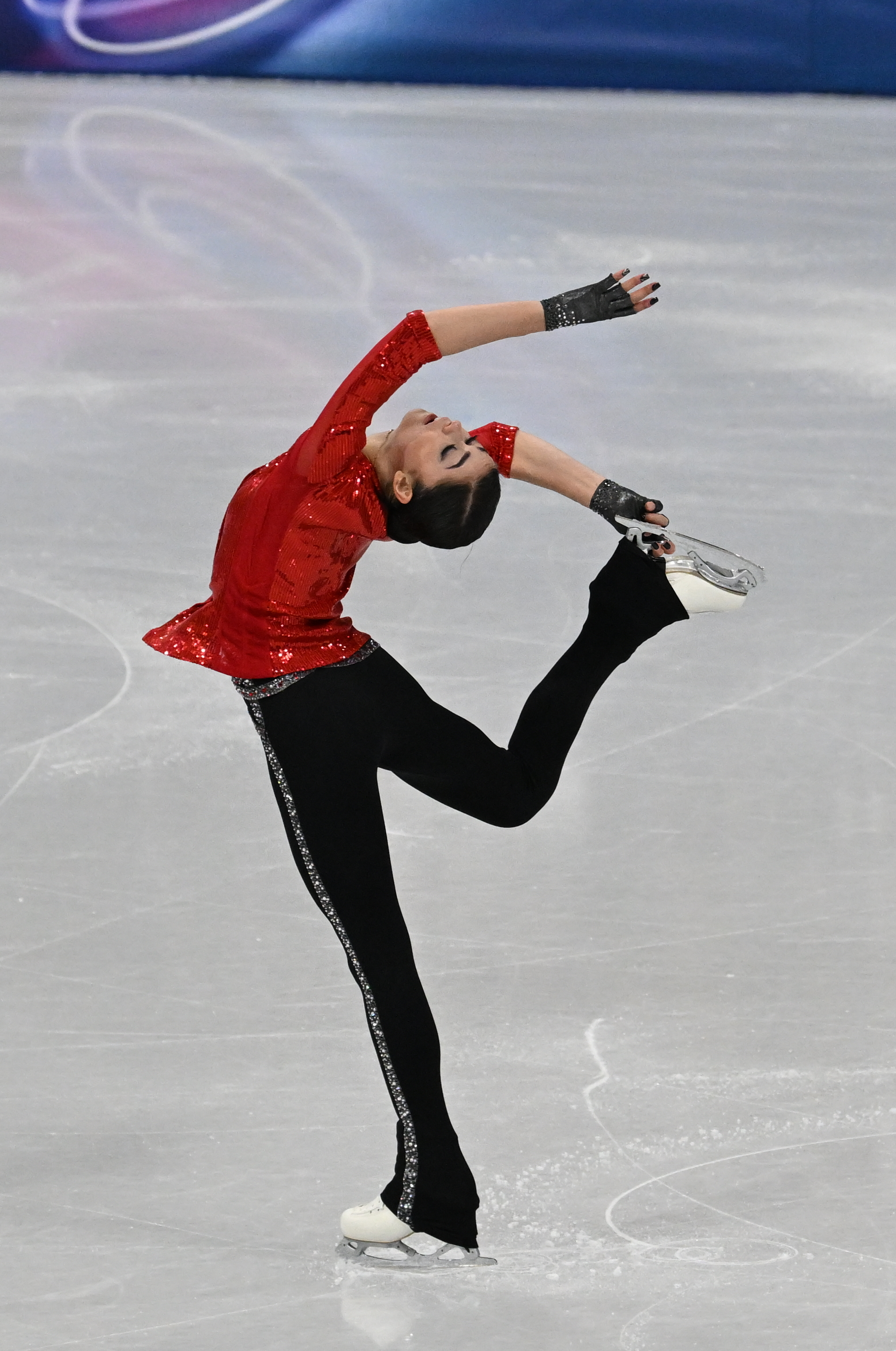
Petrosian performing a catch-foot layback spin during her short program at the 2026 Winter Olympics

In May 2025, the International Skating Union (ISU) announced that Petrosian as well as Alina Gorbacheva had both been approved as Individual Neutral Athletes (AIN), making them both eligible to compete at the 2025 ISU Olympic Qualifying Competition to vie for a spot to compete at the 2026 Winter Olympics. The Figure Skating Federation of Russia selected Petrosian to compete and Gorbacheva as the reserve.

During the off-season, Petrosian sustained a groin injury and as a result, was forced to miss several weeks of training.

Days before the ISU Skate to Milano, it was announced that Petrosian's coach and choreographer, Daniil Gleikhengauz, would be unable to attend the event as originally planned due to failing to meet the ISU selection criteria for support staff. As a result, a physiotherapist and a couple of representatives of the Figure Skating Federation of Russia were sent out to accompany her. Meanwhile, Petrosian's coach, Eteri Tutberidze, attended the event as a representative for the Georgian figure skating team. Despite this, Petrosian managed to win the gold medal after winning all competition segments, thus securing an Olympic spot for Russian women's singles skating as Individual Neutral Athletes. At the event, she opted to not attempt any quadruple jumps due to them being inconsistent following her injury's recovery. Petrosian continued her season by competing at the 2025 Russian Grand Prix I, Magnitogorsk. She restored her quadruple toe-loops in training before the competition yet fell on her attempt in the free skate. Despite this, she won the competition, continuing her streak of being domestically undefeated. A couple weeks later, she competed at the 2025 Russian Grand Prix IV, Moscow, winning that event as well.

In late November, the International Olympic Committee (IOC) officially declared Petrosian as eligible to compete at the 2026 Winter Olympics. The following month, she won the Russian Championships for a third consecutive time.

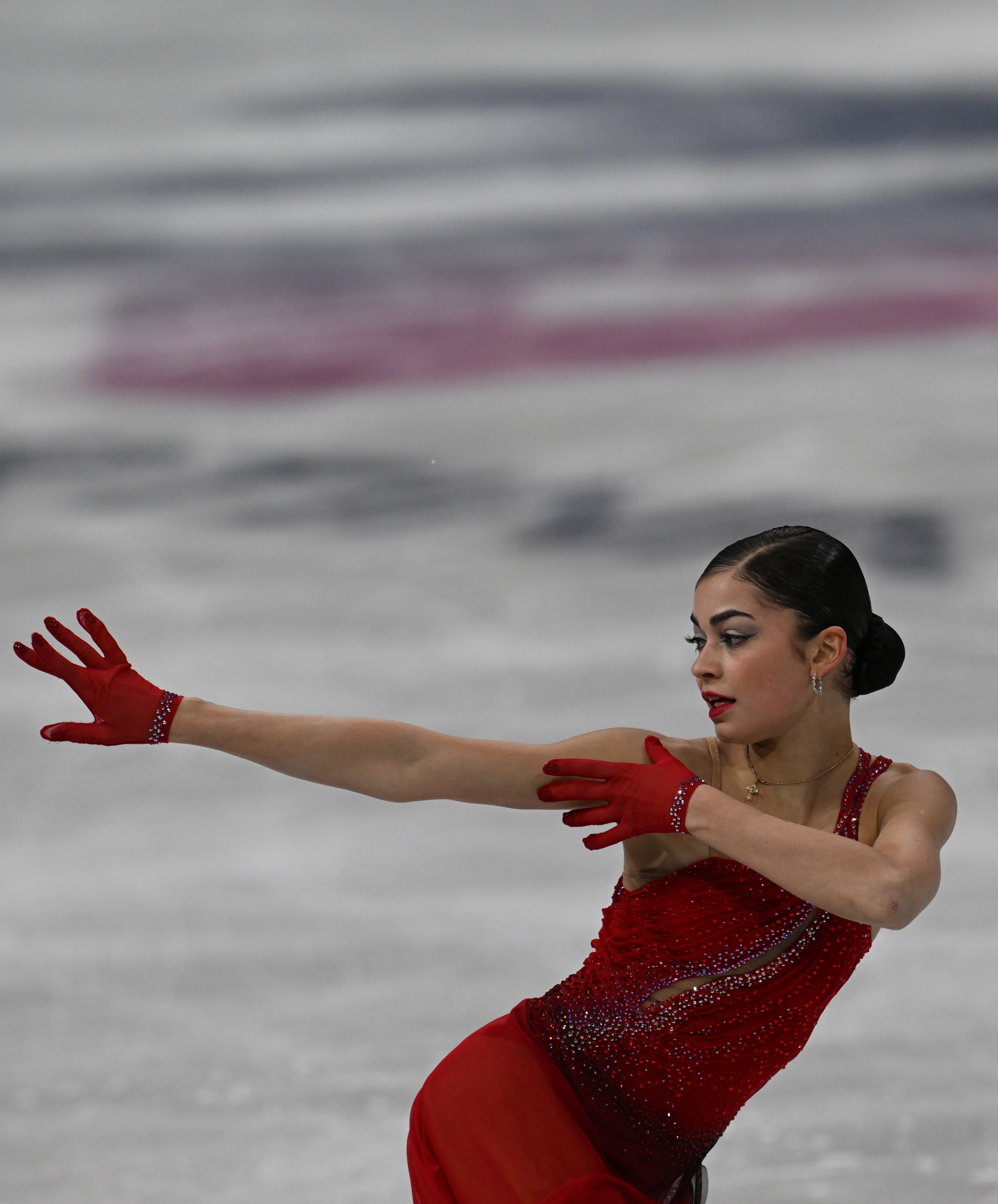
Petrosian performing her free skate at the 2026 Winter Olympics

On 17 February, Petrosian competed in the short program at the 2026 Winter Olympics, where she delivered a clean skate and placed fifth in that segment. “I hope the spectators enjoyed it as well,” said Petrosian of her program. "Mentally and psychologically, I was calm. I wasn’t nervous. These are my first Olympic Games, so I don’t feel any big pressure. We’ll see how it goes in the free skate." Two days later, Petrosian competed in the free skate segment. She and her coaching team decided to include two quadruple jumps, recognising their importance for a chance at the podium. Petrosian was the only competitor to attempt a quadruple toe-loop, but she fell on the jump. This lead her to omit the second quadruple jump planned in her program, and she managed to skate the rest of the program cleanly. She placed fifth in the segment with a score of 141.64. She finished sixth overall with a total score of 214.53, 4.63 points behind the bronze medalist. Reflecting on her performance, Petrosian stated, "I think it will be mentally difficult for me to come back to Russia after such a skate... I feel a little ashamed — for myself, for the federation, for my coaches, and for the spectators that it went this way. I understand that it’s my own fault. That’s why I think it will be a bit difficult." One week following the event, it was revealed that Petrosian had been competing with a back injury that she sustained the previous month where she twisted her back and was unable to train for two weeks.

In late February, Petrosian withdrew from the 2026 Russian Grand Prix Final. The following month, she competed in the Channel One Trophy for Team Moscow. She skated the short program segment, placing first.

=== 2026–27 season ===
On 30 June 2026, the International Skating Union announced that figure skaters from Russia and Belarus would be allowed to compete at international competitions as Individual Neutral Athletes (AINs). Each of these skaters are required to undergo an individual assessment conducted by the ISU Council to determine whether they meet the criteria for neutral status. Petrosian's application was approved, allowing her to continue competing as a neutral athlete.

In late July, Petrosian announced via her Instagram that she had left her longtime coaches, Eteri Tutberidze, Sergei Dudakov, and Daniil Gleikhengauz. She subsequently stated that she was not in a rush to find a new coach but rather wished to prioritize healing from a hip injury. It was later announced that Adeliia would continue training under the guidance of Inna Goncharenko.

In October, Petrosian opened the new season by competing at the 2026 CS Trialeti Trophy, where she placed second behind Niina Petrõkina. Her result at Trialeti Trophy named her to the Grand Prix alternate list and she was later assigned to NHK Trophy and Skate America following Chaeyeon Kim's and Nina Pinzarrone's withdrawals. Following this, Petrosian competed domestically and placed fourth at the Russian Grand Prix stage four.

Petrosian made her senior Grand Prix debut at the 2026 Skate America. Her coach Goncharenko was unable to obtain a visa on time; Petrosian attended the event without a coach. She placed fourth in the short program and seventh in the free program, concluding the competition in sixth place overall. "There is nothing to say. I don't know what went wrong. Everything was fine in practice and in the warm up. I was focused as usual. Something went wrong," shared Petrosian after the free program.

== Skating style and influences ==
Petrosian is known as the first female skater to perform a quadruple loop in domestic competition and the first skater, male or female, to perform two quadruple loops in a free skate. This was initially reported by the Russian state media. The ISU Figure Skating Media Guide 2024/25 lists Petrosian's name among the "firsts", but included a note of these accomplishments only occurring in domestic competition. Her figure skating idol is Evgenia Medvedeva.

== Programs ==
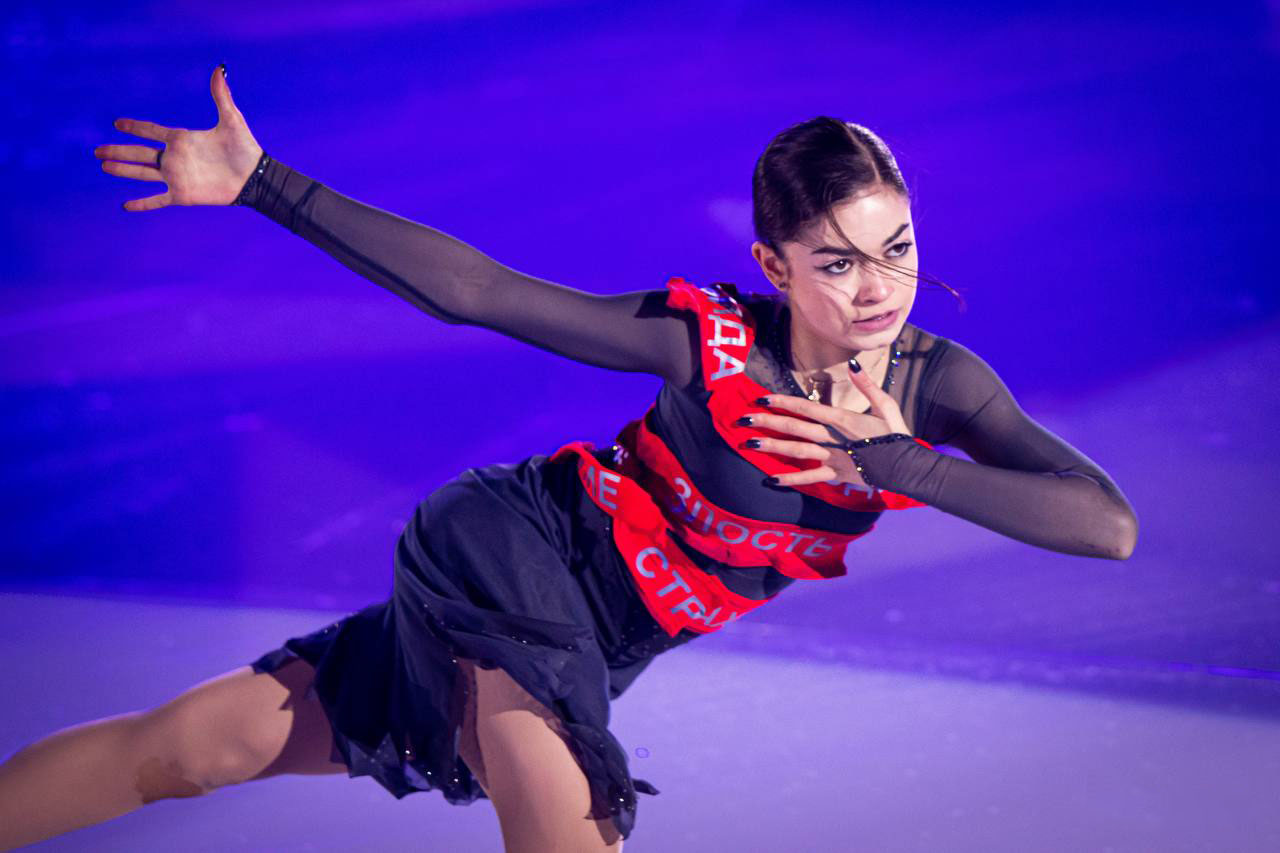
Petrosian in 2024

| Season | Short program | Free skating | Exhibition |
|---|---|---|---|
| 2026–2027 | The Show Must Go On by Queen performed by Jan Vayne, Oneil, Kanvise, and Ercodes choreo. by Anjelika Krylova | Home; The Children; The Night King (from Game of Thrones) by Ramin Djawadi choreo. by Artem Fedorchenko | |
| 2025–2026 | Earth Song; Billie Jean; They Don't Care About Us by Michael Jackson choreo. by Daniil Gleikhengauz | Nocturne No. 1 in D minor by Jon Batiste; Yo Soy Maria (from María de Buenos Aires) by Astor Piazzolla performed by Milva choreo. by Daniil Gleikhengauz | Waka Waka (This Time for Africa) by Shakira; Hips Don't Lie by Shakira ft. Wyclef Jean; February by Leonid Levashkevich choreo. by Daniil Gleikhengauz |
| 2024–2025 | Interlude by Erika Lundmoen; A Taste of Elegance by Anne-Sophie Versnaeyen and Gabriel Saban choreo. by Daniil Gleikhengauz | Nocturne No. 1 in D minor by Jon Batiste; Yo Soy Maria (from María de Buenos Aires) by Astor Piazzolla performed by Milva choreo. by Daniil Gleikhengauz | Voilà by Barbara Pravi choreo. by Daniil Gleikhengauz |
| 2023–2024 | Earth Song; Billie Jean; They Don't Care About Us by Michael Jackson choreo. by Daniil Gleikhengauz | February by Leonid Levashkevich choreo. by Daniil Gleikhengauz | Snow by Elena Vaenga |
| 2022–2023 | Voilà by Barbara Pravi choreo. by Daniil Gleikhengauz | The Locked Room by Jun Miyake; Vie-Ni by Ennio Morricone; Mechanisms by Kirill Richter choreo. by Daniil Gleikhengauz | No Time to Die by Billie Eilish; Paint It Black by The Rolling Stones performed by Ciara choreo. by Ksenia Potalitsyna; Sous le ciel de Paris; Milord performed by Édith Piaf choreo. by Ksenia Potalitsyna |
| 2021–2022 | A Evaristo Carriego by Osvaldo Pugliese choreo. by Ksenia Potalitsyna | No Time to Die by Billie Eilish; Paint It Black by The Rolling Stones performed by Ciara choreo. by Ksenia Potalitsyna | Artsakh by Ara Gevorgyan choreo. by Ksenia Potalitsyna |
| 2020–2021 | A Evaristo Carriego by Osvaldo Pugliese choreo. by Ksenia Potalitsyna | Artsakh by Ara Gevorgyan choreo. by Ksenia Potalitsyna | |
| 2019–2020 | Après moi by Regina Spektor choreo. by Ksenia Potalitsyna | Sous le ciel de Paris; Milord performed by Édith Piaf choreo. by Ksenia Potalitsyna | |

== Competitive highlights ==
- GP – Event of the ISU Grand Prix Series
- CS – Event of the ISU Challenger Series
- JGP – Event of the ISU Junior Grand Prix Series
- TBD – Placement to be decided
- C – Event was cancelled
- WD – Withdrew

=== Skating as an Individual Neutral Athlete ===
Competition placements at senior level
| Season | 2025–26 | 2026–27 |
|---|---|---|
| Winter Olympics | 6th | |
| GP NHK Trophy | | TBD |
| GP Skate America | | 6th |
| CS Trialeti Trophy | | 2nd |
| Skate to Milano | 1st | |

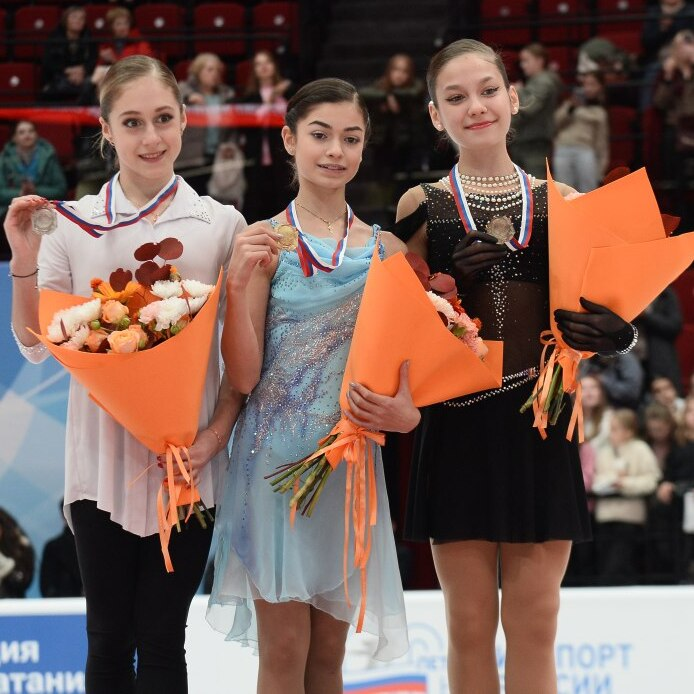
2023 Russian Grand Prix II, Omsk medal ceremony; Petrosian (center), Alina Gorbacheva (left), Maria Agaeva (right)

=== Skating for Russia ===
Competition placements at senior level
| Season | 2021–22 | 2022–23 | 2023–24 | 2024–25 | 2025–26 | 2026–27 |
|---|---|---|---|---|---|---|
| Russian Championships | 3rd | 5th | 1st | 1st | 1st | |
| Russian Grand Prix Final (Note: The 2023 Russian Cup Final was renamed as the 2023 Russian Grand Prix Final.) | | 1st | 1st | 1st | | |
| Russian GP Stage 1 (Note: In 2022, the Russian Cup Stages were renamed to Russian Grand Prix Stages.) | | | 1st | | 1st | |
| Russian GP Stage 2 | | 1st | 1st | 1st | | |
| Russian GP Stage 4 | | | | 1st | 1st | 4th |
| Russian GP Stage 5 | 2nd | | | | | |

Competition placements at junior level
| Season | 2019–20 | 2020–21 | 2021–22 |
|---|---|---|---|
| Junior Grand Prix Final | | | C |
| Russian Championships | 6th | 2nd | 5th |
| JGP Slovakia | | | 3rd |
| JGP Slovenia | | | 1st |
| Russian Cup Final | 3rd | 3rd | |
| Russian Cup Stage 1 | 5th | | |
| Russian Cup Stage 2 | 3rd | | |
| Russian Cup Stage 3 | | 1st | |
| Russian Cup Stage 5 | | 4th | |

== Detailed results ==
ISU personal best scores in the +5/-5 GOE System
| Segment | Type | Score | Event |
|---|---|---|---|
| Total | TSS | 214.53 | 2026 Winter Olympics |
| Short program | TSS | 72.89 | 2026 Winter Olympics |
| Short program | TES | 40.44 | 2026 Winter Olympics |
| Short program | PCS | 32.45 | 2026 Winter Olympics |
| Free skating | TSS | 141.64 | 2026 Winter Olympics |
| Free skating | TES | 77.24 | 2021 JGP Slovenia |
| Free skating | PCS | 66.07 | 2025 Skate to Milano |

=== Skating as an Individual Neutral Athlete ===
Results in the 2026–27 season
| Date | Event | SP | | FS | | Total | |
| Date | Event | P | Score | P | Score | P | Score |
|---|---|---|---|---|---|---|---|
| Oct 1–4, 2026 | (Georgia (country)) 2026 CS Trialeti Trophy | 4 | 68.42 | 1 | 135.74 | 2 | 204.16 |
| Nov 13 - 15, 2026 | (United States) 2026 Skate America | 4 | 71.42 | 7 | 126.56 | 6 | 198.03 |
| Nov 27 - 29 2026 | (Japan) 2026 NHK Trophy | | | | | | |

Results in the 2025–26 season
| Date | Event | SP | | FS | | Total | |
| Date | Event | P | Score | P | Score | P | Score |
|---|---|---|---|---|---|---|---|
| 18–21 September 2025 | (China) 2025 Skate to Milano | 1 | 68.72 | 1 | 140.91 | 1 | 209.63 |
| 17–19 February 2026 | (Italy) 2026 Winter Olympics | 5 | 72.89 | 5 | 141.64 | 6 | 214.53 |

=== Skating for Russia ===
Results in the 2021–22 season
| Date | Event | SP | | FS | | Total | | Details |
| Date | Event | P | Score | P | Score | P | Score | Details |
|---|---|---|---|---|---|---|---|---|
| 17–21 Nov 2021 | (Russia) 2021 Russian Cup Stage V, Perm | 2 | 66.11 | 1 | 147.15 | 2 | 213.26 | Details |
| 21–26 Dec 2021 | (Russia) 2022 Russian Championships | 6 | 73.29 | 2 | 160.68 | 3 | 233.97 | Details |

Results in the 2022–23 season
| Date | Event | SP | | FS | | Total | | Details |
| Date | Event | P | Score | P | Score | P | Score | Details |
|---|---|---|---|---|---|---|---|---|
| 28–30 Oct 2022 | (Russia) 2022 Russian Grand Prix II, Sochi | 1 | 78.92 | 1 | 160.39 | 1 | 239.31 | Details |
| 20–26 Dec 2022 | (Russia) 2023 Russian Championships | 5 | 76.25 | 3 | 159.47 | 5 | 235.72 | Details |
| 3–5 Mar 2023 | (Russia) 2023 Russian Grand Prix Final | 1 | 85.62 | 1 | 169.39 | 1 | 255.01 | Details |

Results in the 2023–24 season
| Date | Event | SP | | FS | | Total | | Details |
| Date | Event | P | Score | P | Score | P | Score | Details |
|---|---|---|---|---|---|---|---|---|
| 13–16 Oct 2023 | (Russia) 2023 Russian Grand Prix I, Ufa | 1 | 84.38 | 1 | 150.36 | 1 | 234.74 | Details |
| 21–22 Oct 2023 | (Russia) 2023 Russian Grand Prix II, Omsk | 2 | 71.48 | 1 | 164.83 | 1 | 236.31 | Details |
| 20–24 Dec 2023 | (Russia) 2024 Russian Championships | 2 | 79.06 | 1 | 167.47 | 1 | 246.53 | Details |
| 14–19 Feb 2024 | (Russia) 2024 Russian Grand Prix Final | 1 | 86.29 | 1 | 166.68 | 1 | 252.97 | Details |

Results in the 2024–25 season
| Date | Event | SP | | FS | | Total | | Details |
| Date | Event | P | Score | P | Score | P | Score | Details |
|---|---|---|---|---|---|---|---|---|
| 1–4 Nov 2024 | (Russia) 2024 Russian Grand Prix II, Kazan | 1 | 85.67 | 1 | 155.88 | 1 | 241.55 | Details |
| 15–18 Nov 2024 | (Russia) 2024 Russian Grand Prix IV, Moscow | 1 | 86.37 | 1 | 165.20 | 1 | 251.57 | Details |
| 18–23 Dec 2024 | (Russia) 2025 Russian Championships | 1 | 85.78 | 1 | 177.14 | 1 | 262.92 | Details |
| 13–17 Feb 2025 | (Russia) 2025 Russian Grand Prix Final | 3 | 75.91 | 1 | 162.88 | 1 | 238.79 | Details |

Results in the 2025–26 season
| Date | Event | SP | | FS | | Total | | Details |
| Date | Event | P | Score | P | Score | P | Score | Details |
|---|---|---|---|---|---|---|---|---|
| 24–27 Oct 2025 | (Russia) 2025 Russian Grand Prix I, Magnitogorsk | 1 | 75.89 | 1 | 147.11 | 1 | 223.00 | Details |
| 14–17 Nov 2025 | (Russia) 2025 Russian Grand Prix IV, Moscow | 1 | 78.83 | 1 | 151.22 | 1 | 230.05 | Details |
| 18–21 Dec 2025 | (Russia) 2026 Russian Championships | 1 | 86.52 | 2 | 149.43 | 1 | 235.95 | Details |

Results in the 2026–27 season
| Date | Event | SP | | FS | | Total | |
| Date | Event | P | Score | P | Score | P | Score |
|---|---|---|---|---|---|---|---|
| Nov 6–9, 2026 | (Russia) 2026 Russian Grand Prix IV, Yekaterinburg | 2 | 72.32 | 4 | 131.28 | 4 | 203.60 |

=== Junior level ===
Results in the 2019–20 season
| Date | Event | SP | | FS | | Total | | Details |
| Date | Event | P | Score | P | Score | P | Score | Details |
|---|---|---|---|---|---|---|---|---|
| 18–22 Sep 2019 | (Russia) 2019 Russian Cup Stage I, Sysran | 4 | 62.40 | 6 | 116.22 | 5 | 178.62 | Details |
| 9–13 Oct 2019 | (Russia) 2019 Russian Cup Stage II, Saransk | 1 | 70.76 | 5 | 115.51 | 3 | 186.27 | Details |
| 4–8 Feb 2020 | (Russia) 2020 Russian Junior Championships | 5 | 68.20 | 7 | 132.87 | 6 | 201.07 | Details |
| 18–22 Feb 2020 | (Russia) 2020 Russian Cup Final | 2 | 71.08 | 3 | 134.14 | 3 | 205.22 | Details |

Results in the 2020–21 season
| Date | Event | SP | | FS | | Total | | Details |
| Date | Event | P | Score | P | Score | P | Score | Details |
|---|---|---|---|---|---|---|---|---|
| 23–27 Oct 2020 | (Russia) 2020 Russian Cup Stage III, Sochi | 1 | 76.50 | 2 | 130.68 | 1 | 207.18 | Details |
| 5–8 Dec 2020 | (Russia) 2020 Russian Cup Stage V, Moscow | 3 | 73.39 | 5 | 117.91 | 4 | 191.30 | Details |
| 2–5 Jan 2021 | (Russia) 2021 Russian Junior Championships | 3 | 72.64 | 2 | 139.23 | 2 | 211.87 | Details |
| 26 Feb – 2 Mar 2021 | (Russia) 2021 Russian Cup Final | 2 | 71.76 | 3 | 132.46 | 3 | 204.22 | Details |

Results in the 2021–22 season
| Date | Event | SP | | FS | | Total | | Details |
| Date | Event | P | Score | P | Score | P | Score | Details |
|---|---|---|---|---|---|---|---|---|
| 1–4 Sep 2021 | 2021 JGP Slovakia | 3 | 69.30 | 3 | 131.91 | 3 | 201.21 | Details |
| 22–25 Sep 2021 | 2021 JGP Slovenia | 1 | 70.86 | 2 | 139.71 | 1 | 210.57 | Details |
| 18–22 Jan 2022 | (Russia) 2022 Russian Junior Championships | 3 | 71.97 | 5 | 130.28 | 5 | 202.25 | Details |
| 26 Feb – 2 Mar 2022 | (Russia) 2022 Russian Cup Final | 1 | 71.61 | 2 | 139.83 | 2 | 211.44 | Details |
