= Inna Utkina =

Russian pair skater and coach

Personal information
- Full name: Inna Alfredovna Utkina
- Other names: Inna Alfredovna Bekker

Figure skating career
- Country: Soviet Union
- Retired: 1985

Inna Alfredovna Utkina née Bekker (Russian: Инна Альфредовна Уткина (Беккер)) is a former pair skater. She competed for the Soviet Union as Inna Bekker with partner Sergei Likhanski, becoming a two-time World Junior medalist (silver in 1982, bronze in 1983) and the 1983 Nebelhorn Trophy champion. They were coached by Irina Rodnina in Moscow.

After retiring from competition, Utkina became a coach in Moscow. She has coached Lubov Iliushechkina / Nodari Maisuradze, Anastasia Martiusheva / Alexei Rogonov, Maria Paliakova / Nikita Bochkov, and others.

Utkina is originally from Temirtau, Kazakhstan.

== Competitive highlights ==
(with Likhanski)

International
Event	1980–81	1981–82	1982–83	1983–84	1984–85
Nebelhorn Trophy				1st	
Prague Skate				1st	
St. Ivel International					1st
Internat. St. Gervais				1st	
International: Junior
World Junior Champ.	4th	2nd	3rd		
