= Denis Leushin =

Russian figure skater

Personal information
- Full name: Denis Alexandrovich Leushin
- Born: 25 July 1985 (age 41) Kirov, Kirov Oblast
- Height: 1.77 m (5 ft 9 1/2 in)

Figure skating career
- Country: Russia
- Coach: Marina Selitskaia
- Skating club: Sokolniki
- Began skating: 1989
- Retired: 2011

Denis Alexandrovich Leushin (Russian: Денис Александрович Леушин; born 25 July 1985) is a Russian former competitive figure skater. He placed 13th at the 2004 World Junior Championships in The Hague and won gold at the 2010 Golden Spin of Zagreb. After retiring from competition, he began working as a coach in Russia.

== Competitive highlights ==
JGP: Junior Grand Prix

International
Event	99–00	00–01	01–02	03–04	04–05	05–06	06–07	07–08	08–09	09–10	10–11
Golden Spin							2nd			6th	1st
Nebelhorn						12th	4th				
Universiade											6th
International: Junior
Junior Worlds				13th							
JGP China					6th						
JGP Germany				5th	8th						
JGP Slovenia				5th							
National
Russian	15th	14th	18th	8th	10th	15th	13th	16th	7th	5th	8th
Russian Junior	14th	6th	11th	3rd	4th						

== Programs ==
Season	Short program	Free skating
2003–04	Lord of the Dance by Ronan Hardiman	West Side Story by Leonard Bernstein
