= Maria Paliakova =

Belarusian pair skater

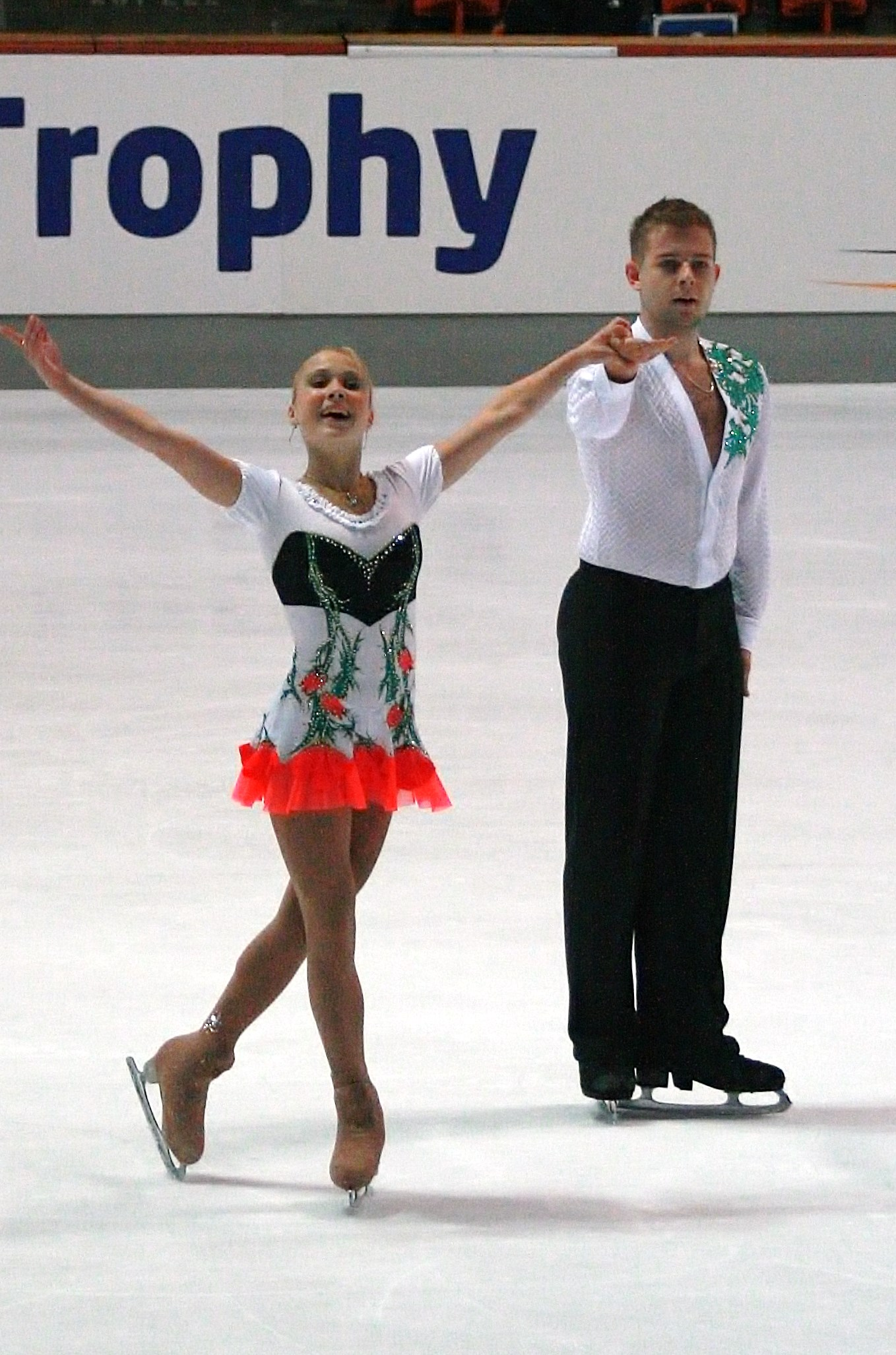
- Paliakova and Bochkov at the 2013 Nebelhorn Trophy

Personal information
- Other names: Palyakova
- Born: 28 August 1992 (age 34) Minsk, Belarus
- Height: 1.55 m (5 ft 1 in)

Figure skating career
- Country: Belarus
- Partner: Nikita Bochkov
- Coach: Inna Utkina, Pavel Kitashev
- Skating club: Olympic School Minsk
- Began skating: 2000

Maria Uladzimirauna Paliakova (born 28 August 1992) is a Belarusian pair skater. With partner Nikita Bochkov, she has won several senior international medals and the Belarus national title.

Paliakova skated with Mikhail Fomichev from January 2010 to spring 2012. She then teamed up with Bochkov.

== Programs ==
=== With Bochkov ===
Season	Short program	Free skating
2015–2016	Stop! by Sam Brown	Nostradamus performed by the Royal Philharmonic Orchestra
2014–2015	Corpse Bride by Danny Elfman	Cell Block Tango (from Chicago (musical)) by John Kander
2013–2014	Russian Dance (from Swan Lake) by Pyotr Tchaikovsky	Burlesque
2012–2013	Toccata; Salut d'Amour; Toccata performed by David Garrett	Burlesque

=== With Fomichev ===
Season	Short program	Free skating
2011–2012	Kashmir by Led Zeppelin performed by Escala	Nostalgia by Yanni
2010–2011	Croatian Rhapsody performed by Maksim Mrvica	Nostalgia by Yanni

== Competitive highlights ==
=== With Bochkov ===
International
Event	2012–13	2013–14	2014–15	2015–16
Worlds		20th	17th	
Europeans	14th	14th	14th	
Universiade			6th	
CS Mordovian Ornament				6th
CS Nebelhorn		14th	9th	
CS Volvo Open			3rd	
Coupe du Printemps	2nd			
Golden Spin		4th		
Ice Star		2nd		
NRW Trophy	8th			
Toruń Cup	2nd			
Ukrainian Open		4th		
Warsaw Cup	2nd	3rd		
National
Belarus Champ.	1st		1st	

=== With Fomichev ===
International
Event	2010–11	2011–12
Europeans		18th
Junior Worlds	18th	19th
JGP Estonia		9th
JGP Poland		8th
National
Belarus Champ.	2nd	2nd
