= Nikita Bochkov =

Russian pair skater

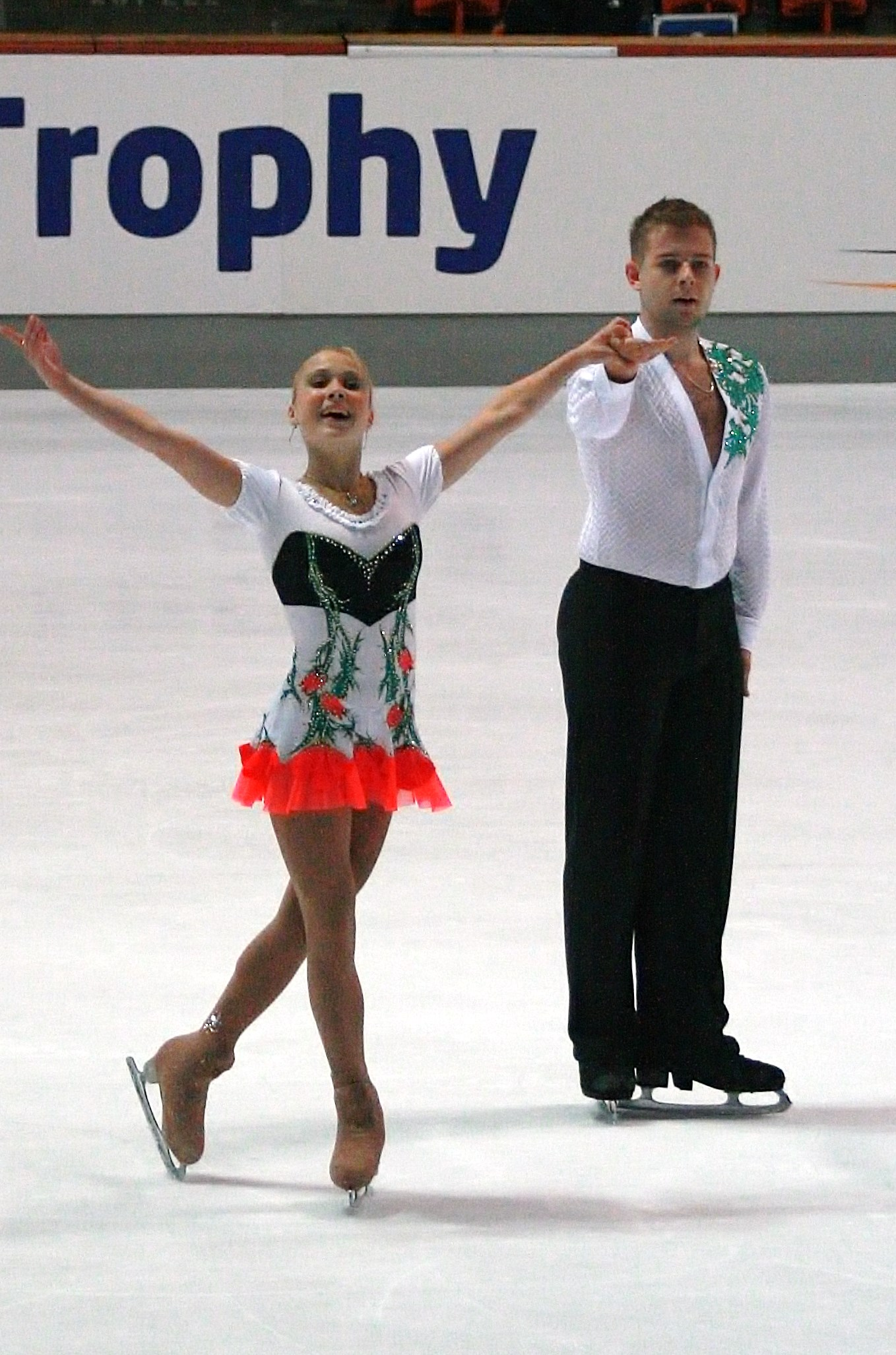
- Paliakova and Bochkov at the 2013 Nebelhorn Trophy

Personal information
- Full name: Nikita Mikhailovich Bochkov
- Born: 16 May 1991 (age 35) Moscow
- Height: 1.75 m (5 ft 9 in)

Figure skating career
- Country: Belarus
- Partner: Maria Paliakova
- Coach: Inna Utkina, Pavel Kitashev
- Began skating: 2002

Nikita Mikhailovich Bochkov (Russian: Никита Михайлович Бочков; born 16 May 1991) is a Russian pair skater who currently represents Belarus with partner Maria Paliakova. With former partner Kristina Astakhova, he placed seventh at the 2011 World Junior Championships.

== Programs ==
=== With Paliakova ===
Season	Short program	Free skating
2015–2016	Stop! by Sam Brown	Nostradamus performed by the Royal Philharmonic Orchestra
2014–2015	Corpse Bride by Danny Elfman	Cell Block Tango (from Chicago (musical)) by John Kander
2013–2014	Russian Dance (from Swan Lake) by Pyotr Tchaikovsky	Burlesque
2012–2013	Toccata; Salut d'Amour; Toccata performed by David Garrett	Burlesque

=== With Astakhova ===
Season	Short program	Free skating
2010–2011	Tango Amore by Edvin Marton	Angels & Demons by Hans Zimmer

== Competitive highlights ==
=== With Paliakova for Belarus ===
International
Event	2012–13	2013–14	2014–15	2015–16
Worlds		20th	17th	
Europeans	14th	14th	14th	
Universiade			6th	
CS Mordovian Ornament				6th
CS Nebelhorn		14th	9th	
CS Volvo Open			3rd	
Coupe du Printemps	2nd			
Golden Spin		4th		
Ice Star		2nd		
NRW Trophy	8th			
Toruń Cup	2nd			
Ukrainian Open		4th		
Warsaw Cup	2nd	3rd		
National
Belarus Champ.	1st		1st	

=== With Astakhova for Russia ===
International
Event	2010–11
Junior Worlds	7th
ISU Junior Grand Prix in Austria	9th
National
Russian Junior	3rd
