= Alena Kanysheva =

Russian ice dancer (born 2005)

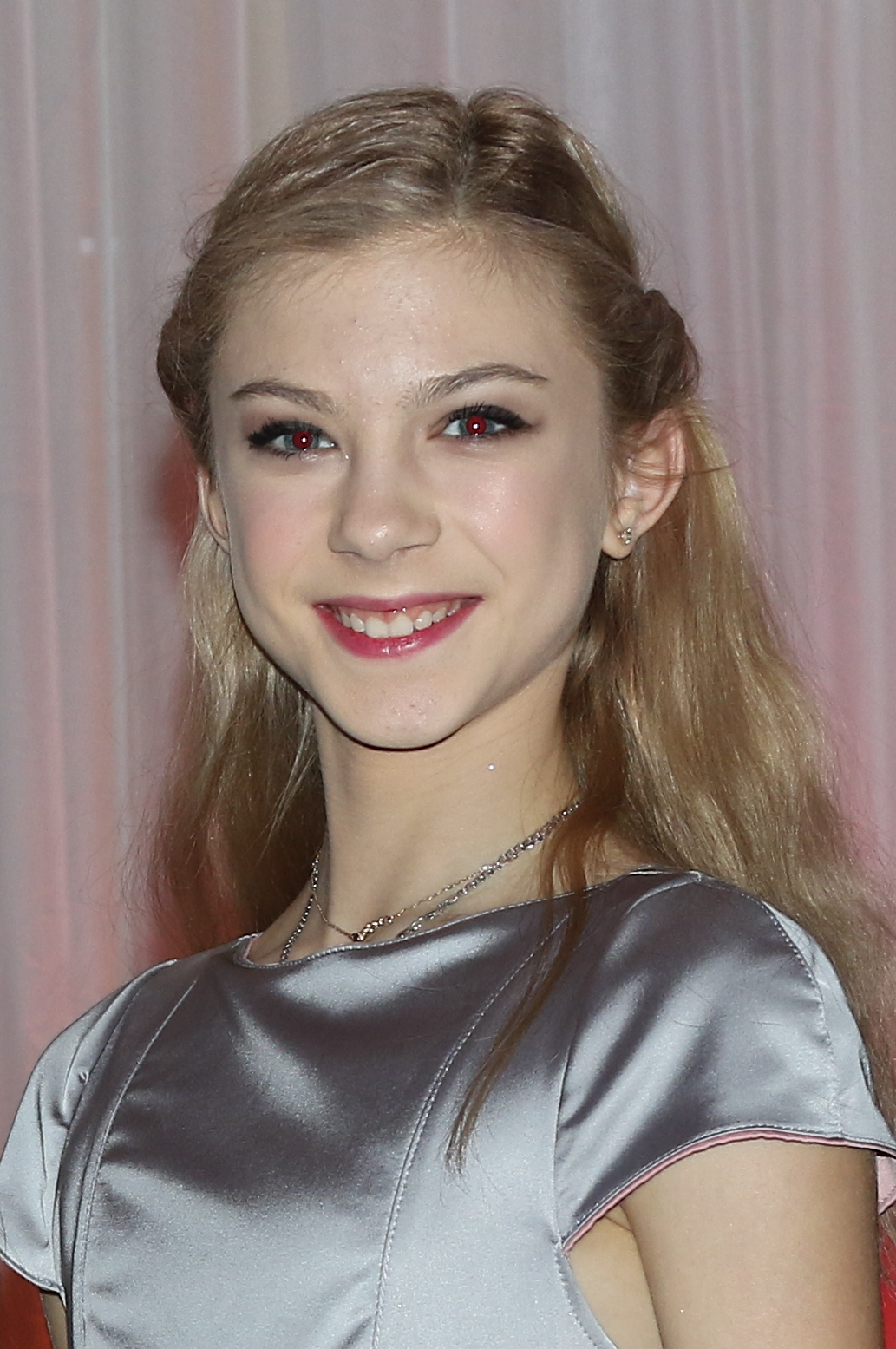
- Kanysheva at the 2018–19 Junior Grand Prix Final

Personal information
- Native name: Алёна Дмитриевна Канышева (Russian)
- Full name: Alena Dmitrievna Kanysheva
- Other names: Alyona Kanysheva
- Born: 15 June 2005 (age 21) Moscow, Russia
- Height: 1.65 m (5 ft 5 in)

Figure skating career
- Country: Russia
- Began skating: 2009
- Retired: 28 January 2020 (singles skating); 8 December 2021 (ice dance)
Medal record
Representing Russia
Figure skating: Ladies' singles
Junior Grand Prix Final
Bronze medal – third place	2018–19 Vancouver	Ladies' singles

Alena Dmitrievna Kanysheva (Russian: Алёна Дмитриевна Канышева; her first name is properly pronounced Alyona as the Cyrillic ё is pronounced yo; born 15 June 2005) is a Russian retired figure skater. As a single skater, she is the 2018 Junior Grand Prix Final bronze medalist, the 2018 JGP Armenia silver medalist, the 2018 JGP Austria silver medalist, and the 2018 Golden Bear of Zagreb champion.

== Career ==
=== Early career ===
In November 2016, Kanysheva won the gold medal at the novice level of the Tallinn Trophy ahead of You Young (South Korea).

=== 2017–2018 season ===
In January 2018, Kanysheva competed in the 2018 Russian Junior Championships. She placed 8th at the competition.

=== 2018–2019 season: JGP Final bronze medalist ===
In August 2018, Kanysheva debuted on the Junior Grand Prix (JGP) series in Linz, Austria. She was ranked 2nd in both the short program and the free skating and she won the silver medal behind Russian teammate Alena Kostornaia.

At her 2nd JGP event of the season, she won another silver medal, now in Yerevan, Armenia. She was ranked 2nd in the short program and 3rd in the free skate. Kanysheva was about 33 points behind the gold medalist, her teammate Alexandra Trusova, but beat the bronze medalist, Yuhana Yokoi, by about 3.5 points. Both Kanysheva and her teammate Anna Tarusina won two silver medals during the JGP season. However, since Kanysheva accumulated more combined total points from her two JGP events than Tarusina, Kanysheva qualified for the 2018–19 Junior Grand Prix Final by a margin of 4 points.

At the JGP Final, Kanysheva won the bronze medal after placing 3rd in both the short program and the free skate. At this event she also scored her personal best score of 198.14 points.

In early February 2019 at the 2019 Russian Junior Championships, Kanysheva finished 11th.

In mid-February, Kanysheva represented Russia at the 1st Winter Children of Asia International Sports Games, winning the silver behind You Young and ahead of Ksenia Sinitsyna.

=== 2019–2020 season: Injury and retirement from single skating ===
Kanysheva was assigned to two Junior Grand Prix events, but was eventually replaced at both assignments due to injury.

On 28 January 2020, Kanysheva announced her retirement from single skating on her Instagram account, citing a back injury that made jumping too painful to continue. She stated her plan to continue her skating career in ice dance. It was announced on 8 June 2020 that she had begun training under coach Denis Samokhin and his wife, Maria Borovikova, assisted by 2019 World Junior silver medalist Nikita Nazarov. She was partnered with Andrei Pylin, but the team briefly split for a two-month period in early 2021, during which time Pylin teamed up with Anna Kolomenskaya. Kanysheva/Pylin reunited in late April 2021, and announced that they'd left Samokhin and Borovikova's team to train with Ksenia Rumyantseva and Ekaterina Volobueva.

=== End of skating career ===
Kanysheva announced her retirement from competitive skating and her transition to coaching on 8 December 2021.

== Programs ==
=== With Pylin ===
Season	Rhythm dance	Free dance	Exhibition
2021–2022	Bahama Mama by Boney M.; Sunny performed by Frankie Valli; Daddy Cool by Boney M.	Duo de Guy et Genèvieve performed by Natalie Dessay; I Will Wait for You (from The Umbrellas of Cherbourg) performed by Horst Jankowski	
2020–2021	Singin' in the Rain (from Singin' in the Rain) performed by Gene Kelly choreo. by Nikolai Nikonov and Maria Borovikova	24K Magic by Bruno Mars choreo. by Nikolai Nikonov and Maria Borovikova	

=== As a single skater ===
Season	Short Program	Free skating
2019–2020	The Earth Prelude by Ludovico Einaudi choreo. by Daniil Gleikhengauz	Farewell; Come Back; The Cottage on the Beach (from Atonement) by Dario Marianelli choreo. by Daniil Gleikhengauz
2018–2019	The Show Must Go On (Moonlight Sonata) by Natalia Posnova	Dreams of a Winter Journey by Pyotr Ilyich Tchaikovsky performed by Berlin Philharmonic
2017–2018	The Show Must Go On (Moonlight Sonata) by Natalia Posnova	Catgroove by Parov Stelar
2016–2017	Black Swan by Clint Mansell	Catgroove by Parov Stelar

== Competitive highlights ==
JGP: Junior Grand Prix

=== With Pylin ===
International: Junior
Event	2021–22
Denis Ten MC	5th
Ice Star	1st

=== As a single skater ===
International: Junior
Event	16–17	17–18	18–19	19–20
JGP Final			3rd	
JGP Armenia			2nd	
JGP Austria			2nd	
JGP Croatia				WD
JGP Italy				WD
Children of Asia ISG			2nd	
Golden Bear			1st	
International: Novice
Tallinn Trophy	1st			
National
Russian Junior Champ.		8th	11th	
Levels: N = Advanced novice; J = Junior; WD = Withdrew

== Detailed results ==
ISU Personal best highlighted in bold.

2018–19 season
Date	Event	Level	SP	FS	Total
13–15 February 2019	2019 WCAISG	Junior	2; 65.62	2; 134.74	2; 200.36
1–4 February 2019	2019 Russian Junior Championships	Junior	9; 67.66	13; 112.72	11; 180.38
6–9 December 2018	2018–19 JGP Final	Junior	3; **68.66**	3; **129.48**	3; **198.14**
24–28 October 2018	2018 Golden Bear	Junior	1; 71.50	1; 126.17	1; 197.67
10–13 October 2018	2018 JGP Armenia	Junior	2; 67.75	3; 119.80	2; 187.55
29 Aug. – 1 Sept. 2018	2018 JGP Austria	Junior	2; 67.77	2; 124.07	2; 191.84
**2017–18 season**
Date	Event	Level	SP	FS	Total
23–26 January 2018	2018 Russian Junior Championships	Junior	9; 67.94	8; 127.18	8; 195.12
**2016–17 season**
Date	Event	Level	SP	FS	Total
19–27 November 2016	2016 Tallinn Trophy	Novice	1; 45.34	2; 88.84	1; 134.18
