= Lina Kudriavtseva =

Russian pair skater

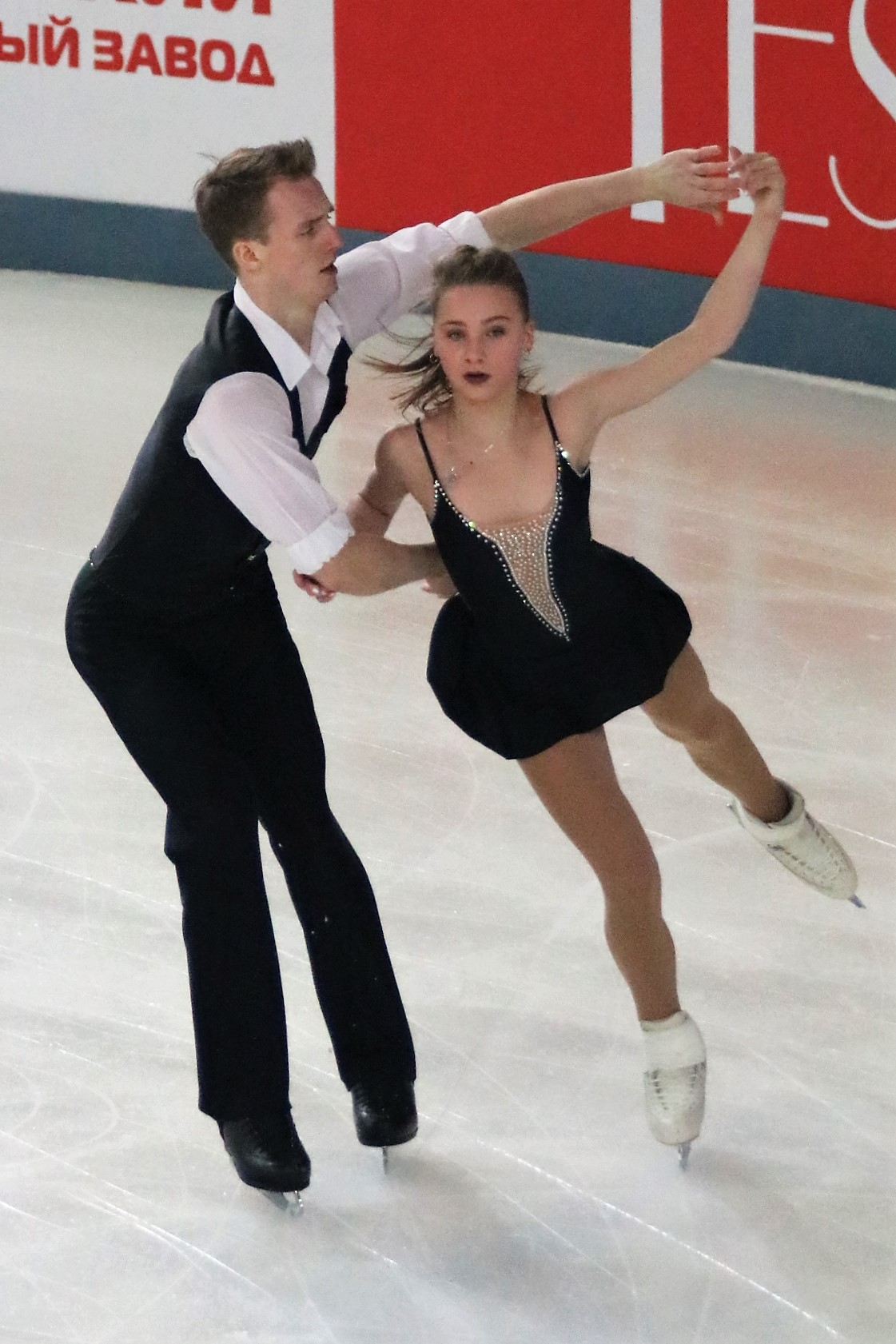
- Kudriavsteva/Spiridonov at the 2019 Russian Championships

Personal information
- Native name: Лина Александровна Кудрявцева (Russian)
- Full name: Lina Alexandrovna Kudriavtseva
- Other names: Kudryavtseva
- Born: 4 November 2002 (age 23) Tver, Russia
- Height: 1.56 m (5 ft 1 1/2 in)

Figure skating career
- Country: Russia
- Coach: Nodari Maisuradze; Artur Dmitriev; Alexander Zaitsev
- Skating club: UOR 4 Moscow
- Began skating: 2006
- Retired: 2022

Lina Alexandrovna Kudriavtseva (Russian: Лина Александровна Кудрявцева; born 4 November 2002) is a retired Russian pair skater. With her former skating partner, Ilia Spiridonov, she is the 2018 CS Ondrej Nepela Trophy bronze medalist and the 2019 Denis Ten Memorial Challenge champion.

== Programs ==
With Spiridonov

Season	Short program	Free skating
2019–2020		
2018–2019	Call Out My Name by The Weeknd choreo. by Sergei Komolov	Torn by Nathan Lanier choreo. by Sergei Komolov
2017–2018	Down by Marian Hill	Die Fledermaus: Overture by Johann Strauss II

== Competitive highlights ==
CS: Challenger Series

With Spiridonov

International
Event	2018–19	2019–20
CS Ondrej Nepela	3rd	
Denis Ten MC		1st
National
Russian Champ.	9th	

== Detailed results ==
ISU Personal Best highlighted in bold.

With Spiridonov

**2019–20 season**
Date	Event	SP	FS	Total
9–12 October 2019	2019 Denis Ten Memorial Challenge	1; 67.70	2; 97.57	1; 165.27
**2018–19 season**
Date	Event	SP	FS	Total
19–23 December 2018	2019 Russian Championships	7; 67.86	10; 114.83	9; 182.69
19–22 September 2018	2018 CS Ondrej Nepela Trophy	2; **62.69**	4; **94.43**	3; **157.12**
