= 2019 Russian Figure Skating Championships =

- Type: National championship
- Date: 19–23 December 2018 (S); 31 January – 4 February 2019 (J)
- Season: 2018–19
- Location: Saransk (S); Perm (J)
- Host: Figure Skating Federation of Russia

Champions
- Men's singles: Maxim Kovtun (S); Daniil Samsonov (J)
- Ladies' singles: Anna Shcherbakova (S); Alexandra Trusova (J)
- Pairs: Evgenia Tarasova / Vladimir Morozov (S); Anastasia Mishina / Aleksandr Galliamov (J)
- Ice dance: Victoria Sinitsina / Nikita Katsalapov (S); Sofia Shevchenko / Igor Eremenko (J)
- Previous: 2018 Russian Championships
- Next: 2020 Russian Championships

The 2019 Russian Figure Skating Championships (Russian: Чемпионат России по фигурному катанию на коньках 2019) were held from 19 to 23 December 2018 in Saransk. Medals were awarded in the disciplines of men's singles, ladies' singles, pair skating, and ice dancing. The results were among the criteria used to select Russia's teams to the 2019 European Championships and 2019 World Championships.

== Competitions ==
In the 2018–19 season, Russian skaters competed in domestic qualifying events and national championships for various age levels. The Russian Cup series will lead to three events – the Russian Championships, the Russian Junior Championships, and the Russian Cup Final.

Date	Event	Type	Location	Details
14–18 September 2018	1st stage of Russian Cup	Qualifier	Syzran, Samara Oblast	Details
2–6 October 2018	2nd stage of Russian Cup	Qualifier	Yoshkar-Ola, Mari El	Details
16–20 October 2018	3rd stage of Russian Cup	Qualifier	Krasnoyarsk, Krasnoyarsk Krai	Details
6–10 November 2018	4th stage of Russian Cup	Qualifier	Kazan, Tatarstan	Details
20–24 November 2018	5th stage of Russian Cup	Qualifier	Moscow	Details
19–23 December 2018	2019 Russian Championships	Final	Saransk, Mordovia	Details
31 January – 4 February 2019	2019 Russian Junior Championships	Final	Perm, Perm Krai	Details
18–22 February 2019	2019 Russian Cup Final	Final	Veliky Novgorod, Novgorod Oblast	Details
14–18 March 2019	2019 Russian Youth Championships – Singles	Final	Tver, Tver Oblast	Details
1–5 April 2019	2019 Russian Youth Championships – Pair and Dance	Final	Sochi, Krasnodar Krai	Details

== Medalists of most important competitions ==
Senior Championships
Discipline	Gold	Silver	Bronze
Men	Maxim Kovtun	Mikhail Kolyada	Alexander Samarin
Ladies	Anna Shcherbakova	Alexandra Trusova	Alena Kostornaia
Pairs	Evgenia Tarasova / Vladimir Morozov	Natalia Zabiiako / Alexander Enbert	Aleksandra Boikova / Dmitrii Kozlovskii
Ice dancing	Victoria Sinitsina / Nikita Katsalapov	Alexandra Stepanova / Ivan Bukin	Sofia Evdokimova / Egor Bazin
Junior Championships
Discipline	Gold	Silver	Bronze
Men	Daniil Samsonov	Petr Gumennik	Roman Savosin
Ladies	Alexandra Trusova	Alena Kostornaia	Anna Shcherbakova
Pairs	Anastasia Mishina / Aleksandr Galliamov	Polina Kostiukovich / Dmitrii Ialin	Apollinariia Panfilova / Dmitry Rylov
Ice dancing	Sofia Shevchenko / Igor Eremenko	Arina Ushakova / Maxim Nekrasov	Elizaveta Khudaiberdieva / Nikita Nazarov
Cup Final
Discipline	Gold	Silver	Bronze
Men	Andrei Lazukin	Alexander Petrov	Anton Shulepov
Ladies	Evgenia Medvedeva	Elizaveta Tuktamysheva	Viktoria Vasilieva
Pairs	Alina Pepeleva / Roman Pleshkov	Lina Kudriavtseva / Ilia Spiridonov	Anastasia Poluianova / Dmitry Sopot
Ice dancing	Tiffany Zahorski / Jonathan Guerreiro	Betina Popova / Sergey Mozgov	Annabelle Morozov / Andrei Bagin
Junior men	Andrei Mozalev	Georgiy Kunitsa	Gleb Lutfullin
Junior ladies	Maya Khromykh	Daria Usacheva	Anna Frolova
Junior pairs	Anastasia Mishina / Aleksandr Galliamov	Stanislava Vislobokova / Aleksei Briukhanov	Tatyana Kuzmina / Alexei Khvalko
Junior ice dancing	Irina Khavronina / Dario Cirisano	Diana Davis / Gleb Smolkin	Sonya Kamyshanova / Dmitry Bovin
Youth Championships – Pair and Dance
Discipline	Gold	Silver	Bronze
Pairs	Stanislava Vislobokova / Aleksei Briukhanov	Anastasia Mukhortova / Dmitry Evgenyev	Anna Scheglova / Ilya Kalashnikov
Ice dancing	Ekaterina Katashinskaya / Aleksandr Vaskovich	Sofya Tyutyunina / Alexander Shustitskiy	Olga Mamchenkova / Mark Volkov
Youth Championships – Singles
Discipline	Gold	Silver	Bronze
Men	Lev Vinokur	Maxim Belyavsky	Semyon Soloviev
Ladies	Kamila Valieva	Sofia Akateva	Sofia Samodelkina

== Senior Championships ==
The 2019 Senior Championships were held in Saransk, Mordovia from 19 to 23 December 2018. Competitors qualified through international success or by competing in the Russian Cup series' senior-level events.

There are three separate basis for qualification.
1. Qualification based on receiving 2018–19 Grand Prix assignment.
2. Qualification based on qualifying for the 2018–19 Junior Grand Prix Final. However, skaters must have been born in 2004 or earlier to be qualified for the Russian senior championships.
3. Qualification based on Russian Cup series' results.

=== Schedule ===
Day	Date	Start	Finish	Discipline	Event
Day 1	20 December	14.00	16.30	Men	Short program
Day 1	20 December	16:50	18:50	Pairs	Short program
Day 1	20 December	19:15	20:10		Opening ceremony
Day 1	20 December	20:30	22:30	Ice dance	Rhythm dance
Day 2	21 December	14:00	16:30	Ladies	Short program
Day 2	21 December	16:50	19:50	Men	Free skating
Day 2	21 December	20:10	22:15	Ice dance	Free dance
Day 3	22 December	15:30	17:45	Pairs	Free skating
Day 3	22 December	18.00	20.50	Ladies	Free skating
Day 4	23 December	13:00	13:45		Victory ceremonies
Day 4	23 December	14:00	16:30		Exhibition gala

=== Entries ===
The Russian figure skating federation published the full list of entries on 12 December 2018.

Men	Ladies	Pairs	Ice dance
Mikhail Kolyada	Evgenia Medvedeva	Evgenia Tarasova / Vladimir Morozov	Alexandra Stepanova / Ivan Bukin
Dmitri Aliev	Alina Zagitova	Natalia Zabiiako / Alexander Enbert	Victoria Sinitsina / Nikita Katsalapov
Alexander Samarin	Maria Sotskova	Daria Pavliuchenko / Denis Khodykin	Tiffany Zahorski / Jonathan Guerreiro
Andrei Lazukin	Polina Tsurskaya	Aleksandra Boikova / Dmitrii Kozlovskii	Betina Popova / Sergey Mozgov
Artur Dmitriev Jr.	Daria Panenkova	Alisa Efimova / Alexander Korovin	Anastasia Skoptsova / Kirill Aleshin
Maxim Kovtun	Sofia Samodurova	Anastasia Mishina / Aleksandr Galliamov	Sofia Evdokimova / Egor Bazin
Roman Savosin	Stanislava Konstantinova	Polina Kostiukovich / Dmitrii Ialin	Anastasia Shpilevaya / Grigory Smirnov
Vladimir Samoilov	Alena Leonova	Kseniia Akhanteva / Valerii Kolesov	Annabelle Morozov / Andrei Bagin
Konstantin Milyukov	Alexandra Trusova	Apollinariia Panfilova / Dmitry Rylov	Ludmila Sosnitskaia / Pavel Golovishnikov
Alexander Petrov	Alena Kostornaia	Anastasia Poluianova / Dmitry Sopot	Olga Bibikhina / Daniil Zvorykin
Artem Lezheev	Anna Shcherbakova	Nadezhda Labazina / Nikita Rakhmanin	Valeria Dementieva / Alexei Novikov
Anton Shulepov	Anastasia Tarakanova	Lina Kudriavtseva / Ilia Spiridonov	Ekaterina Mironova / Evgenii Ustenko
Artem Kovalev	Anastasiia Guliakova		Maria Ignatieva / Mikhail Bragin
Egor Rukhin	Anna Tarusina		Anastasia Zhirnokleeva / Roman Meschankin
Egor Murashov	Anastasiia Gubanova		
Vladislav Katichev	Maria Talalaikina		
Artem Zotov	Elizaveta Nugumanova		
	Viktoria Vasilieva		

=== Changes to preliminary entries ===
Date	Discipline	Withdrew	Added	Reason/Other notes	Refs
12 December	Men	Alexey Erokhov	Vladislav Katichev	Recovery from back injury	
12 December	Ladies	Elena Radionova	Elizaveta Nugumanova	Recovery from back injury	
18 December	Men	Petr Gumennik	Artem Zotov	Recovery from acute bronchitis	
18 December	Ladies	Elizaveta Tuktamysheva	Viktoria Vasilieva	Recovery from pneumonia	
19 December	Men	Sergei Voronov	None	Knee injury	
19 December	Ice dance	Anastasia Shakun / Daniil Ragimov	None		
20 December	Men	Egor Rukhin	None	Back injury	

=== Results ===
==== Men ====
Rank	Name	Total points	SP		FS	
1	Maxim Kovtun	281.59	1	95.14	1	186.45
2	Mikhail Kolyada	268.40	2	94.70	3	173.70
3	Alexander Samarin	265.49	4	83.24	2	182.25
4	Andrei Lazukin	237.66	5	81.43	6	156.23
5	Dmitri Aliev	235.48	8	71.74	4	163.74
6	Konstantin Milyukov	231.68	3	90.05	9	141.63
7	Alexander Petrov	219.94	13	61.64	5	158.30
8	Egor Murashov	216.99	10	66.28	7	150.71
9	Artur Dmitriev Jr.	215.81	6	79.75	10	136.06
10	Anton Shulepov	206.96	7	77.07	12	129.89
11	Vladimir Samoilov	205.90	15	60.30	8	145.60
12	Roman Savosin	199.90	9	70.71	13	129.19
13	Vladislav Katichev	195.54	11	63.17	11	132.37
14	Artem Kovalev	187.26	14	61.57	15	125.69
15	Artem Lezheev	185.44	12	62.57	16	122.87
16	Artem Zotov	176.72	16	47.80	14	128.92
WD	Egor Rukhin	withdrew	withdrew from competition			

==== Ladies ====
Rank	Name	Total points	SP		FS	
1	Anna Shcherbakova	229.78	5	74.09	1	155.69
2	Alexandra Trusova	229.71	2	74.96	2	154.75
3	Alena Kostornaia	226.54	3	74.40	3	152.14
4	Stanislava Konstantinova	212.92	4	74.40	5	138.52
5	Alina Zagitova	212.03	1	80.62	12	131.41
6	Sofia Samodurova	209.77	6	71.82	6	137.95
7	Evgenia Medvedeva	205.90	14	62.24	4	143.66
8	Anna Tarusina	205.16	9	70.01	7	135.15
9	Anastasiia Gubanova	203.76	8	70.54	11	133.22
10	Anastasiia Guliakova	202.63	10	68.99	10	133.64
11	Viktoria Vasilieva	199.55	13	65.59	9	133.96
12	Alena Leonova	199.52	7	70.79	13	128.73
13	Anastasia Tarakanova	193.44	17	59.17	8	134.27
14	Polina Tsurskaya	185.32	11	66.35	15	118.97
15	Maria Talalaikina	181.62	16	60.35	14	121.27
16	Maria Sotskova	179.90	12	65.73	16	114.17
17	Elizaveta Nugumanova	172.23	15	60.63	18	111.60
18	Daria Panenkova	167.78	18	53.63	17	114.15

==== Pairs ====
Rank	Name	Total points	SP		FS	
1	Evgenia Tarasova / Vladimir Morozov	236.80	1	80.06	1	156.74
2	Natalia Zabiiako / Alexander Enbert	230.49	2	78.53	2	151.96
3	Aleksandra Boikova / Dmitrii Kozlovskii	220.40	3	74.98	3	145.42
4	Daria Pavliuchenko / Denis Khodykin	209.15	5	71.56	4	137.59
5	Anastasia Mishina / Aleksandr Galliamov	204.83	4	72.85	5	131.98
6	Alisa Efimova / Alexander Korovin	199.67	6	70.61	6	129.06
7	Apollinariia Panfilova / Dmitry Rylov	190.72	8	65.97	8	124.75
8	Polina Kostiukovich / Dmitrii Ialin	189.33	9	64.43	7	124.90
9	Lina Kudriavtseva / Ilia Spiridonov	182.69	7	67.86	10	114.83
10	Kseniia Akhanteva / Valerii Kolesov	175.04	12	57.90	9	117.14
11	Nadezhda Labazina / Nikita Rakhmanin	174.34	10	62.76	12	111.58
12	Anastasia Poluianova / Dmitry Sopot	172.89	11	59.08	11	113.81

==== Ice dance ====
Rank	Name	Total points	RD		FD	
1	Victoria Sinitsina / Nikita Katsalapov	212.32	1	84.01	1	128.31
2	Alexandra Stepanova / Ivan Bukin	208.49	2	81.95	2	126.54
3	Sofia Evdokimova / Egor Bazin	179.21	4	69.87	3	109.34
4	Betina Popova / Sergey Mozgov	176.93	5	69.62	4	107.31
5	Anastasia Skoptsova / Kirill Aleshin	175.10	6	69.00	5	106.10
6	Anastasia Shpilevaya / Grigory Smirnov	173.23	7	68.00	6	105.23
7	Tiffany Zahorski / Jonathan Guerreiro	171.76	3	73.37	7	98.39
8	Annabelle Morozov / Andrei Bagin	163.16	8	65.95	8	97.21
9	Ludmila Sosnitskaya / Pavel Golovishnikov	149.76	9	60.48	9	89.28
10	Olga Bibikhina / Daniil Zvorykin	131.45	10	50.50	10	80.95
11	Maria Ignatieva / Mikhail Bragin	126.62	11	48.91	13	77.71
12	Ekaterina Mironova / Evgenii Ustenko	126.55	12	47.29	11	79.26
13	Valeria Dementieva / Alexei Novikov	119.10	13	41.00	12	78.10
14	Anastasia Zhirnokleeva / Roman Meschankin	95.80	14	39.15	14	56.65

== Junior Championships ==
The 2019 Russian Junior Championships (Russian: Первенство России среди юниоров 2019) were held in Perm, Perm Krai from 31 January to 4 February 2019. Competitors qualified through international success or by competing in the Russian Cup series' junior-level events. The results of the Junior Championships are part of the selection criteria for the 2019 World Junior Championships.

There are two separate basis for qualification.
1. Qualification based on competing at the 2018–19 Junior Grand Prix series.
2. Qualification based on Russian Cup series' junior-level results.

=== Schedule ===
Day	Date	Start	Finish	Discipline	Event
Day 1	2 February	14.00	16.30	Men	Short program
Day 1	2 February	16:45	17:15		Opening ceremony
Day 1	2 February	17:30	20:00	Ladies	Short program
Day 1	2 February	20:15	22:15	Ice dance	Rhythm dance
Day 2	3 February	14:00	17:00	Men	Free skating
Day 2	3 February	17:15	19:00	Pairs	Short program
Day 2	3 February	19:15	22:00	Ladies	Free skating
Day 2	3 February	22:15	22:45		Victory ceremonies
Day 3	4 February	12:00	14:15	Ice dance	Free dance
Day 3	4 February	14:30	16:30	Pairs	Free skating
Day 3	4 February	16:45	17:15		Victory ceremonies

=== Entries ===
The Russian figure skating federation published the full list of entries on 30 January 2019.

Men	Ladies	Pairs	Ice dance
Petr Gumennik	Alexandra Trusova	Anastasia Mishina / Aleksandr Galliamov	Arina Ushakova / Maxim Nekrasov
Andrei Mozalev	Alena Kostornaia	Polina Kostiukovich / Dmitrii Ialin	Sofia Shevchenko / Igor Eremenko
Artur Danielian	Anna Shcherbakova	Kseniia Akhanteva / Valerii Kolesov	Elizaveta Khudaiberdieva / Nikita Nazarov
Roman Savosin	Anastasia Tarakanova	Apollinariia Panfilova / Dmitry Rylov	Elizaveta Shanaeva / Devid Naryzhnyy
Kirill Iakovlev	Kseniia Sinitsyna	Alina Pepeleva / Roman Pleshkov	Diana Davis / Gleb Smolkin
Egor Murashov	Alena Kanysheva	Stanislava Vislobokova / Aleksei Briukhanov	Polina Ivanenko / Daniil Karpov
Artem Kovalev	Anna Tarusina	Diana Mukhametzianova / Ilya Mironov	Eva Kuts / Dmitrii Mikhailov
Matvei Vetlugin	Viktoria Vasilieva	Alexandra Koshevaya / Dmitry Bushlanov	Ekaterina Andreeva / Ivan Desyatov
Egor Rukhin	Daria Usacheva	Anna Scheglova / Ilya Kalashnikov	Sofya Tyutyunina / Alexander Shustitskiy
Daniil Samsonov	Anastasiia Shabotova	Milana Matakaeva / Sergei Bezborodko	Irina Khavronina / Dario Cirisano
Ilya Yablokov	Viktoriia Safonova	Ekaterina Belova / Dmitrii Chigirev	Ekaterina Katashinskaya / Aleksandr Vaskovich
Leonid Sviridenko	Anna Frolova	Uliana Orlova / Sergei Bakhmat	Nika Daineko / Leonid Okin
Vladislav Dikidzhi	Anastasia Kostyuk		Polina Pankova / Anton Spiridonov
Gleb Lutfullin	Maria Smirnova		Margarita Svistunova / Dmitrii Studenikin
Georgiy Kunitsa	Maria Pavlova		Olga Mamchenkova / Mark Volkov
Mikhail Polyanskiy	Nikol Vaytkus		
Andrei Kutovoi	Eva Kobzar		
Alexey Erokhov	Maria Dmitrieva		

=== Changes to preliminary entries ===
Date	Discipline	Withdrew	Added	Reason/Other notes	Refs
5 November 2018	Ice dance	Ksenia Konkina / Alexander Vakhnov		Split up	
10 December 2018	Pairs	Daria Kvartalova / Alexei Sviatchenko		Split up	
30 January 2019	Men		Alexey Erokhov		
30 January 2019	Ladies	Kamila Valieva	Maria Dmitrieva	Injury	
30 January 2019	Pairs	Anastasia Poluianova / Dmitry Sopot; Nadezhda Labazina / Nikita Rakhmanin	Ekaterina Belova / Dmitrii Chigirev; Uliana Orlova / Sergei Bakhmat		
30 January 2019	Ice dance	Angelina Lazareva / Maxim Prokofiev	Olga Mamchenkova / Mark Volkov		
1 February 2019	Men	Aleksandr Golubev			
3 February 2019	Pairs	Kseniia Akhanteva / Valerii Kolesov	None	Akhanteva's illness	

=== Results ===
==== Men ====
Rank	Name	Total points	SP		FS	
1	Daniil Samsonov	249.33	1	87.07	1	162.26
2	Petr Gumennik	236.72	2	85.94	4	150.78
3	Roman Savosin	229.52	7	78.71	3	150.81
4	Alexey Erokhov	225.34	16	72.33	2	153.01
5	Artur Danielian	224.92	3	84.00	8	140.92
6	Egor Murashov	221.17	6	79.80	7	141.37
7	Georgiy Kunitsa	221.17	4	80.37	9	140.80
8	Egor Rukhin	220.72	11	75.90	5	144.82
9	Andrei Kutovoi	220.26	10	76.60	6	143.66
10	Ilya Yablokov	214.70	12	75.38	10	139.32
11	Andrei Mozalev	211.41	5	79.85	12	131.56
12	Artem Kovalev	207.38	14	74.37	11	133.01
13	Gleb Lutfullin	202.95	9	77.29	13	125.66
14	Leonid Sviridenko	197.17	13	74.87	15	122.30
15	Mikhail Polyanskiy	195.46	15	73.11	14	122.35
16	Vladislav Dikidzhi	194.09	8	77.95	17	116.14
17	Matvei Vetlugin	185.14	17	62.85	16	122.29
18	Kirill Iakovlev	165.31	18	57.06	18	108.25

==== Ladies ====
Rank	Name	Total points	SP		FS	
1	Alexandra Trusova	233.99	7	69.55	1	164.44
2	Alena Kostornaia	230.79	1	79.97	2	150.82
3	Anna Shcherbakova	223.97	2	77.17	3	146.80
4	Kseniia Sinitsyna	212.78	4	73.31	4	139.47
5	Anna Tarusina	206.13	5	71.51	5	134.62
6	Viktoria Vasilieva	203.58	6	70.41	6	133.17
7	Anastasia Tarakanova	201.79	3	73.53	7	128.26
8	Viktoriia Safonova	191.45	8	69.25	9	122.20
9	Anna Frolova	186.13	10	65.66	10	120.47
10	Daria Usacheva	181.89	16	56.02	8	125.87
11	Alena Kanysheva	180.38	9	67.66	13	112.72
12	Anastasia Kostyuk	179.92	12	60.30	11	119.62
13	Maria Smirnova	179.18	11	63.92	12	115.26
14	Anastasiia Shabotova	168.45	15	57.13	14	111.32
15	Eva Kobzar	168.22	13	60.29	16	107.93
16	Nikol Vaytkus	156.49	14	58.76	18	97.73
17	Maria Pavlova	156.35	17	53.90	17	102.45
18	Maria Dmitrieva	155.50	18	45.47	15	110.03

==== Pairs ====
Rank	Name	Total points	SP		FS	
1	Anastasia Mishina / Aleksandr Galliamov	199.48	1	72.44	2	127.04
2	Polina Kostiukovich / Dmitrii Ialin	195.92	3	68.52	1	127.40
3	Apollinariia Panfilova / Dmitry Rylov	194.90	2	70.07	3	124.83
4	Alina Pepeleva / Roman Pleshkov	188.10	4	67.88	4	120.22
5	Stanislava Vislobokova / Aleksei Briukhanov	177.34	5	64.04	6	113.30
6	Diana Mukhametzianova / Ilya Mironov	176.26	6	60.23	5	116.03
7	Alexandra Koshevaya / Dmitry Bushlanov	155.99	8	55.61	8	100.38
8	Uliana Orlova / Sergei Bakhmat	154.82	9	53.10	7	101.72
9	Ekaterina Belova / Dmitrii Chigirev	153.98	7	58.53	11	95.45
10	Anna Scheglova / Ilya Kalashnikov	150.92	10	52.89	9	98.03
11	Milana Matakaeva / Sergei Bezborodko	149.26	11	52.68	10	96.58
WD	Kseniia Akhanteva / Valerii Kolesov	withdrew	withdrew from competition			

==== Ice dance ====
Rank	Name	Total points	RD		FD	
1	Sofia Shevchenko / Igor Eremenko	184.97	1	73.03	1	111.94
2	Arina Ushakova / Maxim Nekrasov	180.80	2	70.87	2	109.93
3	Elizaveta Khudaiberdieva / Nikita Nazarov	176.85	3	69.89	3	106.96
4	Elizaveta Shanaeva / Devid Naryzhnyy	167.09	5	64.20	4	102.89
5	Eva Kuts / Dmitrii Mikhailov	164.69	4	65.02	5	99.67
6	Ekaterina Andreeva / Ivan Desyatov	157.72	6	62.08	7	95.64
7	Polina Ivanenko / Daniil Karpov	157.43	8	60.48	6	96.95
8	Sofya Tyutyunina / Alexander Shustitskiy	154.69	10	59.83	8	94.86
9	Diana Davis / Gleb Smolkin	154.09	9	60.31	9	93.78
10	Ekaterina Katashinskaya / Aleksandr Vaskovich	151.22	7	61.26	10	89.96
11	Irina Khavronina / Dario Cirisano	146.13	12	57.27	11	88.86
12	Polina Pankova / Anton Spiridonov	143.06	11	57.34	12	85.72
13	Nika Daineko / Leonid Okin	139.94	13	54.45	13	85.49
14	Olga Mamchenkova / Mark Volkov	128.68	14	53.12	15	75.56
15	Margarita Svistunova / Dmitrii Studenikin	125.71	15	47.95	14	77.76

== International team selections ==
=== European Championships ===
Russia's team to the 2019 European Championships was published on 23 December 2018.

	Men	Ladies	Pairs	Ice dancing
1	Maxim Kovtun	Stanislava Konstantinova	Evgenia Tarasova / Vladimir Morozov	Victoria Sinitsina / Nikita Katsalapov
2	Mikhail Kolyada	Alina Zagitova	~~Natalia Zabiiako / Alexander Enbert~~ (withdrew)	Alexandra Stepanova / Ivan Bukin
3	Alexander Samarin	Sofia Samodurova	Aleksandra Boikova / Dmitrii Kozlovskii	Sofia Evdokimova / Egor Bazin
1st alt.	Andrei Lazukin	Elizaveta Tuktamysheva	Daria Pavliuchenko / Denis Khodykin (called up)	Betina Popova / Sergey Mozgov
2nd alt.	Dmitri Aliev	Evgenia Medvedeva	Anastasia Mishina / Aleksandr Galliamov	Anastasia Skoptsova / Kirill Aleshin
3rd alt.	Sergei Voronov			Tiffany Zahorski / Jonathan Guerreiro

=== Winter Universiade ===
The list with preliminary entries of the Russia's team to the 2019 Winter Universiade was published on 23 December 2018. The final list was approved on 22 February 2019.

	Men	Ladies	Pairs	Ice dancing
1	Maxim Kovtun	Stanislava Konstantinova	Anastasia Poluianova / Dmitry Sopot	Sofia Evdokimova / Egor Bazin
2	Alexander Samarin	~~Elizaveta Tuktamysheva~~ (withdrew)	Alexandra Koshevaya / Dmitry Bushlanov	Betina Popova / Sergey Mozgov
3	Andrei Lazukin		~~Vasilisa Ozerova / Maxim Bobrov~~ (withdrew)	~~Anastasia Skoptsova / Kirill Aleshin~~ (withdrew)
1st alt.	Dmitri Aliev	~~Evgenia Medvedeva~~ (withdrew)	Alisa Efimova / Alexander Korovin (called up)	Anastasia Shpilevaya / Grigory Smirnov (called up)
2nd alt.	Alexander Petrov	Maria Sotskova (called up)		
3rd alt.	Anton Shulepov			

=== European Youth Olympic Winter Festival ===
Russia's team to the 2019 European Youth Olympic Winter Festival was published on 1 February 2019.

	Men	Ladies
1	Ilya Yablokov	Anna Shcherbakova
Alt.	Artur Danielian	Alexandra Trusova
Alt.		Alena Kostornaia
Alt.		Viktoria Vasilieva

=== World Junior Championships ===
Russia's team to the 2019 World Junior Championships was published on 8 February 2019.

	Men	Ladies	Pairs	Ice dancing
1	Petr Gumennik	Alexandra Trusova	Anastasia Mishina / Aleksandr Galliamov	Sofia Shevchenko / Igor Eremenko
2	Roman Savosin	~~Alena Kostornaia~~ (withdrew)	Polina Kostiukovich / Dmitrii Ialin	Arina Ushakova / Maxim Nekrasov
3	~~Alexey Erokhov~~ (withdrew)	Anna Shcherbakova	Apollinariia Panfilova / Dmitry Rylov	Elizaveta Khudaiberdieva / Nikita Nazarov
Alt.	Artur Danielian (called up)	Kseniia Sinitsyna (called up)	Daria Pavliuchenko / Denis Khodykin	Elizaveta Shanaeva / Devid Naryzhnyy
Alt.	Egor Murashov	Anna Tarusina	Alina Pepeleva / Roman Pleshkov	Eva Kuts / Dmitrii Mikhailov
Alt.		Viktoria Vasilieva		Ekaterina Andreeva / Ivan Desyatov

=== World Championships ===
Russia's team to the 2019 World Championships was published on 27 February 2019.

	Men	Ladies	Pairs	Ice dancing
1	Alexander Samarin	Sofia Samodurova	Evgenia Tarasova / Vladimir Morozov	Alexandra Stepanova / Ivan Bukin
2	~~Maxim Kovtun~~ (withdrew)	Alina Zagitova	Natalia Zabiiako / Alexander Enbert	Victoria Sinitsina / Nikita Katsalapov
3	Mikhail Kolyada	Evgenia Medvedeva	Aleksandra Boikova / Dmitrii Kozlovskii	
1st alt.	Andrei Lazukin (called up)	Elizaveta Tuktamysheva	Daria Pavliuchenko / Denis Khodykin	Sofia Evdokimova / Egor Bazin
2nd alt.	Dmitri Aliev	Stanislava Konstantinova	Anastasia Mishina / Aleksandr Galliamov	Tiffany Zahorski / Jonathan Guerreiro
3rd alt.	Sergei Voronov		Alisa Efimova / Alexander Korovin	Betina Popova / Sergey Mozgov

=== World Team Trophy ===
Russia's team to the 2019 World Team Trophy was published on 26 March 2019.

	Men	Ladies	Pairs	Ice dancing
1	~~Mikhail Kolyada~~ (withdrew)	Sofia Samodurova	Natalia Zabiiako / Alexander Enbert	Victoria Sinitsina / Nikita Katsalapov
2	Alexander Samarin	Elizaveta Tuktamysheva		
Alt.	Andrei Lazukin (called up)			
