= Nikita Nazarov =

Russian ice dancer (born 1998)

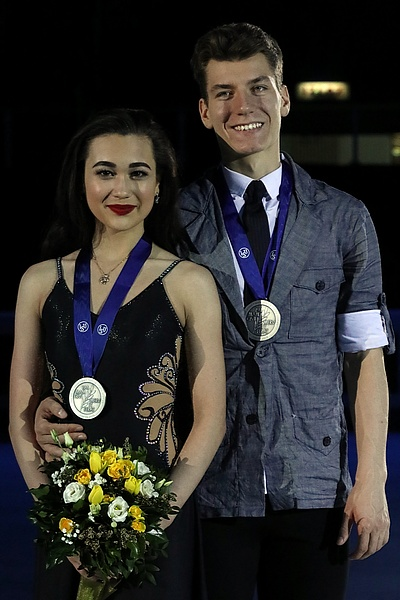

Personal information
- Native name: Никита Геннадьевич Назаров
- Full name: Nikita Gennadievich Nazarov
- Born: 14 May 1998 (age 28) Ryazan, Russia
- Height: 1.78 m (5 ft 10 in)

Figure skating career
- Country: Russia
- Coach: Denis Samokhin, Maria Borovikova
- Skating club: Olimpiets Balashikha Moscow
- Began skating: 2006
Medal record
Representing Russia
Figure skating: Ice dancing
World Junior Championships
Silver medal – second place	2019 Zagreb	Ice dancing
Junior Grand Prix Final
Bronze medal – third place	2018–19 Vancouver	Ice dancing

Nikita Gennadievich Nazarov (Russian: Никита Геннадьевич Назаров; born 14 May 1998) is a Russian competitive ice dancer. With his former skating partner, Elizaveta Khudaiberdieva, he is the 2019 World Junior silver medalist and the 2018–19 Junior Grand Prix Final bronze medalist. He has also won four ISU Junior Grand Prix medals, including gold medals at 2018 JGP Slovakia and 2018 JGP Czech Republic.

== Personal life ==
Nikita Nazarov was born on 5 May 1998 in Ryazan, Russia.

== Career ==
=== Early career ===
Nazarov began learning to skate in 2006. He focused in ice dancing very early on and he competed ice dancing already season 2009–2010 season with his first partner Ekaterina Lautova. He later teamed up with Anastasia Skoptsova with whom he skated two seasons from 2010 to 2012. In 2012 he teamed up with Daria Shirokhova with whom he skated three seasons from 2012 to 2015. He then teamed up with his current partner Elizaveta Khudaiberdieva with whom he started to compete together in 2016–2017 season. They are coached by Denis Samokhin and Maria Borovikova.

=== 2016–2017 season ===
Khudaiberdieva/Nazarov made their international junior debut in January 2017 at the 2017 Toruń Cup where they won the gold medal.

They placed 8th at the 2017 Russian Junior Championships.

=== 2017–2018 season ===
Khudaiberdieva/Nazarov received their first ISU Junior Grand Prix (JGP) assignments in the 2017–2018 season. They won medals at both JGP events, first a bronze medal in late August in Brisbane, Australia and then the silver medal in October in Gdańsk, Poland.

They placed fifth at the 2018 Russian Junior Championships after placing second in the short dance and sixth in the free dance.

=== 2018–2019 season ===
Khudaiberdieva/Nazarov won their first JGP gold medal in August at the 2018 JGP event in Bratislava, Slovakia, after placing first in both the rhythm dance and the free dance. They scored their personal best score of 159.62 points and they beat the silver medalists, Elizaveta Shanaeva / Devid Naryzhnyy, by about seven points. Their rhythm dance, free dance and combined total scores at this competition were the highest scores achieved in an international junior ice dance competition at the time, subsequently surpassed by others.

At their second JGP event of the season in Ostrava, Czech Republic, they won a second gold medal. Again they were ranked first in both the rhythm dance and the free dance. With two JGP gold medals they qualified for the 2018–19 Junior Grand Prix Final. At the Final, Khudaiberdieva/Nazarov won the bronze medal after placing third in the rhythm dance and fourth in the free dance. They were part of a Russian sweep of the ice dance podium. Khudaiberdieva/Nazarov were about 6 points behind both the gold medalists, Sofia Shevchenko / Igor Eremenko and the silver medalists, Arina Ushakova / Maxim Nekrasov, who were separated by only a 0.01 point. Khudaiberdieva/Nazarov won the bronze medal over Marjorie Lajoie / Zachary Lagha, who placed fourth, by a margin of only 0.03 points.

After winning the bronze medal at the 2019 Russian Junior Championships, Khudaiberdieva/Nazarov concluded the season at the 2019 World Junior Championships. They placed second in the rhythm dance, winning a silver small medal and unexpectedly beating their Russian teammates due to superior results on the tango pattern dance. They came fourth in the free dance, but remained in second place overall, winning the silver medal. Khudaiberdieva said the result was not something they had expected, as "we were the number three Russian team, a confident number three though. For us, it was more about overcoming ourselves than anyone else. We haven’t realized yet that we are second at our first Junior Worlds." Noting that it was their final junior season, Nazarov said "there are many teams in Russia, but if you look at the results at major events, they are not that great. But all these teams also once came up from juniors. We just have to work very hard in order to achieve something."

On May 13, 2019, it was announced that Khudaiberdieva and Nazarov had split.

=== 2019–2020 season ===
It was announced on June 8, 2020, that Nazarov began working with Alena Kanysheva, who recently switched from ladies' singles to ice dance.

== Programs ==
=== With Khudaiberdieva ===
Season	Rhythm dance	Free dance
2018–2019	Tango: Tango Amore by Edvin Marton	Human (Acoustic); Human by Rag'n'Bone Man; Nemesis by Benjamin Clementine
	Short dance	
2017–2018	Cha Cha: Suavemente; Samba:	Ghost the Musical by David A. Stewart, Glen Ballard
2016–2017	You Can Leave Your Hat On; Worth It by Fifth Harmony, Kid Ink	Let It Be; Fix You

=== With Shirokhova ===
Season	Short dance	Free dance
2014–2015	Loca by Shakira; Cuéntame Que Te Pasó	The Mask of Zorro by James Horner
2013–2014	Tu vuò fà l'americano	The Mask of Zorro by James Horner

== Records and achievements ==
(with Khudaiberdieva)

- Set the junior-level ice dancing record of the new +5 / -5 GOE (Grade of Execution) system for the combined total (159.62 points), rhythm dance (64.39 points) and free dance (95.23 points) at the 2018 JGP Slovakia.

== Competitive highlights ==
JGP: Junior Grand Prix

=== With Khudaiberdieva ===
International
Event	16–17	17–18	18–19
Junior Worlds			2nd
JGP Final			3rd
JGP Australia		3rd	
JGP Czech Republic			1st
JGP Poland		2nd	
JGP Slovakia			1st
Halloween Cup			1st J
Tallinn Trophy		2nd J	1st J
Toruń Cup	1st J		
National
Russian Jr. Champ.	8th	5th	3rd
J = Junior level; TBD = Assigned

=== With Shirokhova ===
National
Event	2013–14	2014–15
Russian Junior Championships	12th	8th
Russian Youth Champ. Elder Age		2nd

=== With Skoptsova ===
International
Event	2010–11	2011–12
NRW Trophy	13th N	
Tirnavia Ice Cup	1st N	
National
Russian Junior Championships		13th
N = Advanced novice level

== Detailed results ==
Small medals for short and free programs awarded only at ISU Championships.

With Khudaiberdieva

2018–2019 season
Date	Event	Level	RD	FD	Total
4–10 March 2019	2019 World Junior Championships	Junior	2; 68.69	4; 102.53	2; 171.22
1–4 February 2019	2019 Russian Junior Championships	Junior	3; 69.89	3; 106.96	3; 176.85
6–9 December 2018	2018–19 JGP Final	Junior	3; 66.29	4; 98.25	3; 164.54
26 November – 2 December 2018	2018 Tallinn Trophy	Junior	1; 66.04	1; 97.79	1; 163.83
19–21 October 2018	2018 Halloween Cup	Junior	1; 62.79	1; 96.82	1; 159.61
26–29 September 2018	2018 JGP Czech Republic	Junior	1; 65.29	1; 95.71	1; 161.00
22–25 August 2018	2018 JGP Slovakia	Junior	1; 64.39	1; 95.23	1; 159.62
2017–2018 season
Date	Event	Level	SD	FD	Total
23–26 January 2018	2018 Russian Junior Championships	Junior	2; 63.99	6; 85.22	5; 149.21
15–17 December 2017	2017 Grand Prix of Bratislava	Junior	1; 60.87	1; 84.47	1; 145.34
21–26 November 2017	2017 Tallinn Trophy	Junior	2; 61.57	2; 84.36	2; 145.93
4–7 October 2017	2017 JGP Poland	Junior	2; 59.03	3; 74.82	2; 133.85
23–26 August 2017	2017 JGP Australia	Junior	3; 57.25	4; 74.55	3; 131.80
2016–2017 season
Date	Event	Level	SD	FD	Total
1–5 February 2017	2017 Russian Junior Championships	Junior	9; 52.71	7; 82.30	8; 135.01
10–15 January 2017	2017 Toruń Cup	Junior	2; 51.69	1; 80.70	1; 132.39

World Junior Record Holders
Preceded by (Russia) Elizaveta Shanaeva / Devid Naryzhnyy	Junior Rhythm Dance; 24 August 2018 – 7 September 2018	Succeeded by (Russia) Arina Ushakova / Maxim Nekrasov
Preceded by (Russia) Elizaveta Shanaeva / Devid Naryzhnyy	Junior Free Dance; 25 August 2018 – 8 September 2018	Succeeded by (Russia) Arina Ushakova / Maxim Nekrasov
Preceded by (Russia) Elizaveta Shanaeva / Devid Naryzhnyy	Junior Ice Dance Total Score; 25 August 2018 – 8 September 2018	Succeeded by (Russia) Arina Ushakova / Maxim Nekrasov
