= Arina Ushakova (ice dancer) =

Russian ice dancer (born 2002)

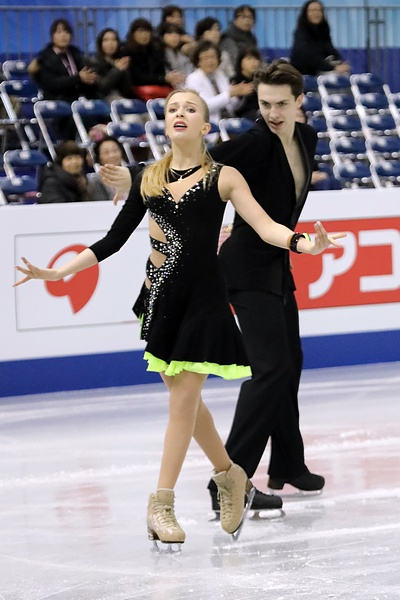
- Ushakova/Nekrasov in December 2017

Personal information
- Native name: Арина Вадимовна Ушакова
- Full name: Arina Vadimovna Ushakova
- Born: 27 June 2002 (age 24) Chelyabinsk, Chelyabinsk Oblast, Russia
- Height: 1.62 m (5 ft 4 in)

Figure skating career
- Country: Russia
- Coach: Alexei Gorshkov, Maxim Bolotin
- Skating club: Sport School Odintsovo
- Began skating: 2005
Medal record
Representing Russia
Figure skating: Ice dancing
World Junior Championships
Bronze medal – third place	2018 Sofia	Ice dancing
Junior Grand Prix Final
Silver medal – second place	2018–19 Vancouver	Ice dancing

Arina Vadimovna Ushakova (Russian: Арина Вадимовна Ушакова, born 27 June 2002) is a Russian competitive ice dancer. With her former skating partner, Maxim Nekrasov, she is the 2018 World Junior bronze medalist and 2018–19 Junior Grand Prix Final silver medalist. She has also won six medals on the ISU Junior Grand Prix series, including gold medals in 2017 Italy, 2018 Lithuania and 2018 Armenia.

== Personal life ==
Arina Vadimovna Ushakova was born on 27 June 2002 in Chelyabinsk, Russia.

== Career ==
=== Early career ===
Ushakova began learning to skate in 2005. She trained as a single skater in Chelyabinsk until 2014; she then moved to Moscow and switched to ice dancing. She competed with her first partner, Anton Spiridonov, during the 2014–2015 season. She then teamed up with Maxim Nekrasov. They were coached by Alexei Gorshkov and Maxim Bolotin.

=== 2016–2017 season ===
Ushakova/Nekrasov received their first ISU Junior Grand Prix (JGP) assignments in the 2016–2017 season. They won bronze medals at both events, competing in late August in Ostrava, Czech Republic and in October in Dresden, Germany.

In November 2016 they won the silver medal at the 2016 Ice Star. They placed seventh at the 2017 Russian Junior Championships.

=== 2017–2018 season ===
Competing in the 2017 JGP series, Ushakova/Nekrasov took bronze in August in Minsk, Belarus. They won their first JGP gold medal in October at the event in Egna, Italy, beating the silver medalists, their teammates Polishchuk/Vakhnov, by about two points. With these results they qualified for the 2017–18 JGP Final, where they placed fifth.

In January 2018, Ushakova/Nekrasov took the bronze medal at the 2018 Russian Junior Championships after placing fifth in the short dance and third in the free dance. In March, they won bronze at the 2018 World Junior Championships in Sofia, Bulgaria, having placed third in both segments.

=== 2018–2019 season ===
Ushakova/Nekrasov started their season by competing in the 2018 JGP series. At their first JGP event of the season they won the gold medal in Kaunas, Lithuania. They were ranked first in both the rhythm dance and the free dance and won the gold medal by a margin of more than 6 points over the silver medalists, Nguyen/Kolesnik. Their rhythm dance, free dance and combined total scores at that competition were the highest scores achieved in an international junior ice dance competition at the time, though since surpassed.

At their second JGP event of the season they won another gold medal, now in Yerevan, Armenia. Again they were ranked first in both the short program and the free skate. Ushakova/Nekrasov also upgraded their earlier short program, free skate and combined total World record scores. With two JGP gold medals they qualified for the 2018–19 Junior Grand Prix Final. At the Final Ushakova/Nekrasov won the silver medal after placing second in the rhythm dance and first in the free dance. They were part of a Russian sweep of the ice dance's podium. Ushakova/Nekrasov beat the bronze medalists, Khudaiberdieva/Nazarov, by about 6 points but the race for the gold medal were extremely tight. The gold medalists, Shevchenko/Eremenko, beat Ushakova/Nekrasov by a margin of only 0.01 point.

Following the Final, Ushakova/Nekrasov were again defeated by Shevchenko/Eremenko at the 2019 Russian Junior Championships, winning the silver medal after second-place finishes in both segments. In late February they won the 2019 Open Ice Mall Cup.

Their final event of the season was the 2019 World Junior Championships, where they unexpectedly placed fourth in the rhythm dance after hitting only two of the eight keypoints on the tango pattern dance. They dropped to fifth place overall after placing fifth in the free dance.

=== 2019–2020 season ===
Ushakova/Nekrasov missed the first half of the season, including the Junior Grand Prix, due to Nekrasov undergoing and recovering from leg surgery. They returned to competition with a victory at the Golden Spin of Zagreb, and then competed at the Russian Junior Championships, where they placed second behind Shanaeva/Naryzhnyy. Their silver medal at junior nationals led to their being assigned to compete at the 2020 World Junior Championships in Tallinn, Estonia. They placed fourth in the rhythm dance there, hitting only three of the eight keypoints on the Teatime Foxtrot pattern dance. Fourth in the free dance as well, they finished fourth overall.

=== 2020–2021 season ===
With the COVID-19 pandemic resulting in the cancellation of the international junior season, Ushakova/Nekrasov competed exclusively domestically. In their final junior event, they won the gold medal at the 2021 Russian Junior Championships.

=== 2021–2022 season ===
Ushakova and Nekrasov moved to the senior level. They withdrew from the Russian test skates, citing medical reasons. It was subsequently reported that Ushakova had contracted COVID-19.

Appearing at their first senior Russian championships, Ushakova/Nekrasov placed seventh.

== Programs ==
(with Nekrasov)

Season	Rhythm dance	Free dance	Exhibition
2020–2021	Charleston, Foxtrot, Swing: All That Jazz (from Chicago) by John Kander & Fred Ebb performed by Catherine Zeta-Jones	Kill Bill soundtrack	
2019–2020	Charleston, Foxtrot, Swing: All That Jazz (from Chicago) by John Kander & Fred Ebb performed by Catherine Zeta-Jones	Milord performed by Édith Piaf	
2018–2019	Tango: Libertango by Astor Piazzolla performed by Bond; Flamenco: Flamenco by Valeri Dolgin	Black Cat, White Cat performed by Goran Bregović	
	Short dance		
2017–2018	Cha cha: Chilly Cha Cha; Rhumba: Love the Way You Lie; Salsa: Cuba	Be Italian (from Nine) performed by Fergie	Confessa by Adriano Celentano
2016–2017	Blues: Natural Blues by Paolo Nutini; Hip hop: Let Me Clear My Throat by DJ Kool	The Gypsies of Nagyida by Imre Czomba	
2015–2016	Starlight Waltz: Libiamo ne' lieti calici from La traviata by Giuseppe Verdi	Chicago by John Kander, Fred Ebb; Nowadays; All That Jazz	

== Records and achievements ==
(with Nekrasov)

- Set the junior-level ice dancing record of the new +5 / -5 GOE (Grade of Execution) system for the combined total (168.17 points), rhythm dance (67.63 points) and free dance (100.54 points) at the 2018 JGP Lithuania.
- They became the first junior team to score above 100 points in the free dance at the 2018 JGP Lithuania.
- Upgraded their junior-level ice dancing record for the combined total (172.81 points), rhythm dance (69.18 points) and free dance (103.63 points) at the 2018 JGP Armenia.
- They became the first junior team to score above 170 points at the 2018 JGP Armenia.

== Competitive highlights ==
JGP: Junior Grand Prix

=== With Nekrasov ===
International
Event	15–16	16–17	17–18	18–19	19–20	20–21	21–22
Junior Worlds			3rd	5th	4th		
JGP Final			5th	2nd			
JGP Armenia				1st			
JGP Belarus			3rd				
JGP Czech Republic		3rd					
JGP Germany		3rd					
JGP Italy			1st				
JGP Lithuania				1st			
Golden Spin					1st J		
Ice Star		2nd J					
Open Ice Mall Cup				1st J			
Tallinn Trophy	5th J						
National
Russian Champ.							7th
Russian Jr. Champ.		7th	3rd	2nd	2nd	1st	
J = Junior level; TBD = Assigned

== Detailed results ==
Small medals for short and free programs awarded only at ISU Championships.

With Nekrasov

2021–2022 season
Date	Event	Level	RD	FD	Total
21–26 December 2021	2022 Russian Championships	Senior	9; 70.27	7; 109.96	7; 180.23
2020–2021 season
Date	Event	Level	RD	FD	Total
1–5 February 2021	2021 Russian Junior Championships	Junior	1; 75.85	1; 111.70	1; 187.55
5–8 December 2020	2020 Cup of Russia Series, 5th Stage, Moscow domestic competition	Senior	1; 73.03	1; 112.79	1; 187.55
8–12 November 2020	2020 Cup of Russia Series, 4th Stage, Kazan domestic competition	Senior	1; 72.95	1; 111.03	1; 183.98
2019–2020 season
Date	Event	Level	RD	FD	Total
2–8 March 2020	2020 World Junior Championships	Junior	4; 66.97	4; 102.21	4; 169.18
4–8 February 2020	2020 Russian Junior Championships	Junior	1; 71.37	2; 110.35	2; 181.72
4–7 December 2019	2019 Golden Spin of Zagreb	Junior	2; 62.34	1; 102.61	1; 164.95
2018–2019 season
Date	Event	Level	RD	FD	Total
4–10 March 2019	2019 World Junior Championships	Junior	4; 65.96	5; 100.52	5; 166.48
20–23 February 2019	2019 Open Ice Mall Cup	Junior	1; 75.15	1; 110.31	1; 185.46
1–4 February 2019	2019 Russian Junior Championships	Junior	2; 70.87	2; 109.93	2; 180.80
6–9 December 2018	2018–19 JGP Final	Junior	2; 67.49	1; 103.16	2; 170.65
10–13 October 2018	2018 JGP Armenia	Junior	1; 69.18	1; 103.63	1; 172.81
5–8 September 2018	2018 JGP Lithuania	Junior	1; 67.63	1; 100.54	1; 168.17
2017–2018 season
Date	Event	Level	SD	FD	Total
5–11 March 2018	2018 World Junior Championships	Junior	3; 61.29	3; 85.59	3; 146.88
23–26 January 2018	2018 Russian Junior Championships	Junior	5; 63.06	3; 90.21	3; 153.27
7–10 December 2017	2017–18 JGP Final	Junior	6; 58.53	5; 83.35	5; 141.88
11–14 October 2017	2017 JGP Italy	Junior	2; 61.07	1; 87.94	1; 149.01
20–24 September 2017	2017 JGP Belarus	Junior	3; 59.62	2; 83.32	3; 142.94
2016–2017 season
Date	Event	Level	SD	FD	Total
1–5 February 2017	2017 Russian Junior Championships	Junior	7; 55.99	8; 79.55	7; 135.54
18–20 November 2016	2016 Ice Star	Junior	2; 58.97	2; 89.57	2; 148.54
5–9 October 2016	2016 JGP Germany	Junior	4; 57.13	3; 83.08	3; 140.21
31 August – 4 September 2016	2016 JGP Czech Republic	Junior	3; 53.46	3; 82.64	3; 136.10
2015–2016 season
Date	Event	Level	SD	FD	Total
18–22 November 2015	2015 Tallinn Trophy	Junior	5; 51.47	5; 71.30	5; 122.77

World Junior Record Holders
Preceded by (Russia) Elizaveta Khudaiberdieva / Nikita Nazarov	Junior Rhythm Dance; 7 September 2018 – 7 March 2019	Succeeded by (Canada) Marjorie Lajoie / Zachary Lagha
Preceded by (Russia) Elizaveta Khudaiberdieva / Nikita Nazarov (Canada) Marjorie Lajoie / Zachary Lagha	Junior Free Dance; 8 September 2018 – 14 September 2018; 13 October 2018 – 9 March 2019	Succeeded by (Canada) Marjorie Lajoie / Zachary Lagha (Canada) Marjorie Lajoie / Zachary Lagha
Preceded by (Russia) Elizaveta Khudaiberdieva / Nikita Nazarov	Junior Ice Dance Total Score; 8 September 2018 – 9 March 2019	Succeeded by (Canada) Marjorie Lajoie / Zachary Lagha
