= Anna Tarusina =

Russian figure skater (born 2003)

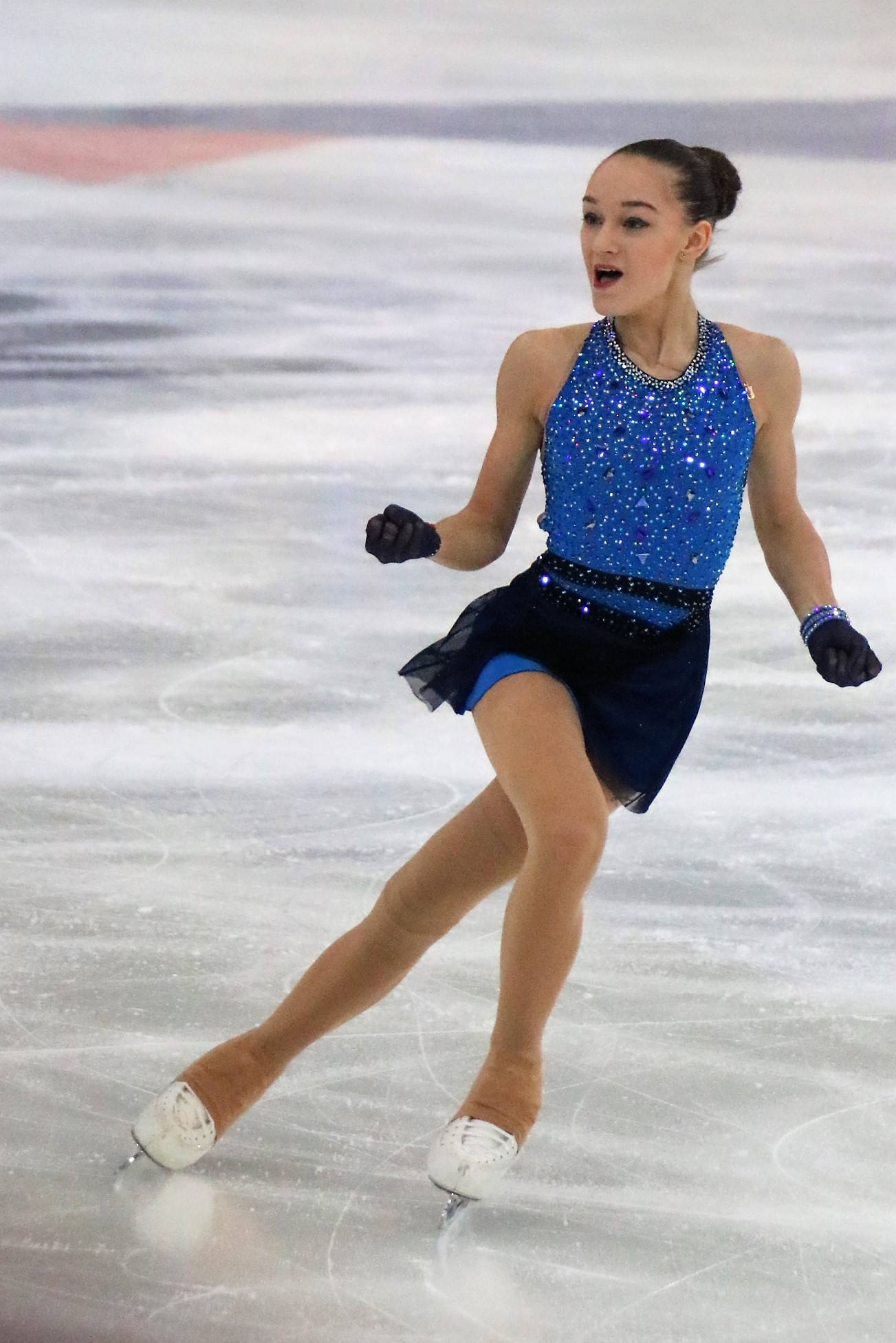
- Tarusina at the 2019 Russian Championships

Personal information
- Native name: Анна Сергеевна Тарусина (Russian)
- Full name: Anna Sergeyevna Tarusina
- Born: 24 January 2003 (age 23) Moscow, Russia
- Height: 1.59 m (5 ft 2 1/2 in)

Figure skating career
- Country: Russia
- Coach: Sergei Davydov
- Skating club: CSKA Moscow
- Began skating: 2008
- Retired: 25 September 2019

Anna Sergeyevna Tarusina (Russian: Анна Сергеевна Тарусина; born 24 January 2003) is a Russian former competitive figure skater. She is the 2018 CS Alpen Trophy champion. On the junior level, she is the 2018 JGP Slovakia and 2018 JGP Slovenia silver medalist.

== Personal life ==
Tarusina was born on 24 January 2003 in Moscow. She was diagnosed with vision problems shortly after birth. As a child, Tarusina studied at a music school.

== Career ==
=== Early career ===
Tarusina began learning to skate in 2008. Until 2013, she trained in Odintsovo under former coach Sergey Chemodanov.

Tarusina finished 12th at the 2015 Russian Junior Championships and 7th at the 2016 Russian Junior Championships.

Tarusina was supposed to make her ISU Junior Grand Prix of Figure Skating debut in August 2016 at the 2016 JGP St. Gervais, alongside Russian teammate Alina Zagitova. However, she and her coach Sergei Davydov, along with other athletes, were in an accident on the shuttle bus en route to the rink where the competition was taking place. Tarusina sustained a knee injury requiring surgery and was forced to withdraw from the competition. She missed most of the 2016–17 season because of the accident but placed 10th at the 2017 Russian Junior Championships.

Tarusina finished 12th at the 2018 Russian Championships, which was her first senior national championships.

=== 2018–19 season ===
Tarusina at the 2019 Russian Figure Skating Championships

Tarusina made her Junior Grand Prix debut in August 2018 at the first JGP competition of the season in Bratislava, Slovakia. She placed second with 186.68 points, behind teammate Anna Shcherbakova and ahead of South Korean competitor You Young.

At her second assignment, JGP Slovenia, Tarusina placed second in both the short program and the free skate to claim the silver medal behind Russian teammate Anastasia Tarakanova and ahead of South Korean competitor Lee Hae-in. Tarusina set a new ISU personal best in her free skate, earning 122.50 points. Both Tarusina and her teammate Alena Kanysheva won two silver medals during JGP season, but since Kanysheva accumulated more combined total points from her two JGP events than Tarusina did, Kanysheva won the tiebreaker for the final qualification place at the 2018–19 Junior Grand Prix Final. Kanysheva accumulated only about 4 points more than Tarusina. Tarusina was the first alternate for the event.

In mid-November, Tarusina made her senior international debut at the 2018 CS Alpen Trophy, a Challenger Series competition held in Innsbruck, Austria. At the Alpen Trophy, she was ranked first in both the short program and the free skate and won the gold medal by a margin of about 24 points over the silver medalist, her teammate Serafima Sakhanovich. At this event, Tarusina also scored her personal best score of 198.76 points.

At the 2019 Russian Championships, Tarusina placed eighth.

=== 2019–20 season ===
Tarusina had knee surgery related to the injury she sustained in the 2016 bus accident prior to the season. After being unable to compete on the Junior Grand Prix due to an extended recovery period, she retired from the sport on 25 September 2019.

== Programs ==
Season	Short program	Free skating
2019–2020	Unconditioned; Following a Bird by Ezio Bosso	En Aranjuez Con Tu Amor performed by Katherine Jenkins
2018–2019	Winter in Buenos Aires by Astor Piazzolla	En Aranjuez Con Tu Amor performed by Katherine Jenkins
2017–2018	Winter in Buenos Aires by Astor Piazzolla	Overture to Raymonde by Ambroise Thomas
2015–2017	Street Passion by DiDuLa	Overture to Raymonde by Ambroise Thomas

== Competitive highlights ==
CS: Challenger Series; JGP: Junior Grand Prix

International
Event	14–15	15–16	16–17	17–18	18–19	19–20
CS Alpen Trophy					1st	
International: Junior
JGP France			WD			
JGP Slovakia					2nd	
JGP Slovenia					2nd	
Ice Star				1st		
National
Russian Champ.				12th	8th	
Russian Junior Champ.	12th	7th	10th		5th	
Russian Cup Final					6th	
Levels: J = Junior; WD = Withdrew, TBD = Assigned

== Detailed results ==
=== Junior level ===
2018–19 season
Date	Event	Level	SP	FS	Total
1–4 February 2019	2019 Russian Junior Championships	Junior	5; 71.51	5; 134.62	5; 206.13
19–23 December 2018	2019 Russian Championships	Senior	9; 70.01	7; 135.15	8; 205.16
11–18 November 2018	2018 CS Alpen Trophy	Senior	1; 67.48	1; 131.28	1; 198.76
3–6 October 2018	2018 JGP Slovenia	Junior	2; 65.74	2; 122.50	2; 188.24
22–25 August 2018	2018 JGP Slovakia	Junior	2; 67.14	3; 119.54	2; 186.68
2017–18 season
Date	Event	Level	SP	FS	Total
19–24 December 2017	2018 Russian Championships	Senior	11; 66.46	12; 129.13	12; 195.59
26–29 October 2017	2017 Ice Star	Junior	1; 64.00	1; 123.84	1; 187.84
2016–17 season
Date	Event	Level	SP	FS	Total
1–5 February 2017	2017 Russian Junior Championships	Junior	10; 62.62	8; 117.60	10; 180.22
24–27 August 2016	2016 JGP France	Junior	WD	WD	WD
2015–16 season
Date	Event	Level	SP	FS	Total
21–23 January 2016	2016 Russian Junior Championships	Junior	8; 61.13	7; 110.84	7; 171.97
2014–15 season
Date	Event	Level	SP	FS	Total
4–7 February 2015	2015 Russian Junior Championships	Junior	14; 52.71	12; 95.03	12; 147.74
