= Sofia Shevchenko =

Russian retired ice dancer (born 2001)

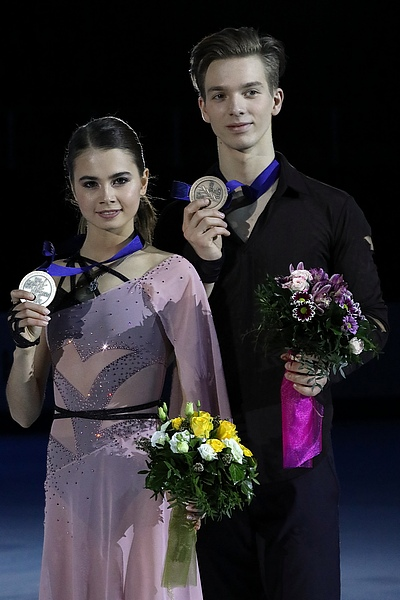
- Shevchenko/Eremenko at the 2019 World Junior Championships

Personal information
- Native name: Софья Антоновна Шевченко
- Full name: Sofia Antonovna Shevchenko
- Born: 14 December 2001 (age 24) Moscow, Russia
- Height: 1.63 m (5 ft 4 in)

Figure skating career
- Country: Russia
- Partner: Andrei Yezhlov
- Coach: Irina Zhuk, Alexander Svinin
- Skating club: UOR 4 Moscow
- Began skating: 2005
Medal record
Representing Russia
Figure skating: Ice dancing
World Junior Championships
Bronze medal – third place	2019 Zagreb	Ice dancing
Junior Grand Prix Final
Gold medal – first place	2018–19 Vancouver	Ice dancing

Sofia Antonovna Shevchenko (Russian: Софья Антоновна Шевченко, born 14 December 2001) is a Russian ice dancer. With her skating partner, Igor Eremenko, she is the 2019 World Junior bronze medalist and the 2018–19 Junior Grand Prix Final champion. She has also won seven ISU Junior Grand Prix medals, including gold medals at 2017 JGP Latvia and 2018 JGP Austria, and she has finished within the top five at the 2018 World Junior Championships.

== Personal life ==
Sofia Antonovna Shevchenko was born on 14 December 2001 in Moscow, Russia.

== Career ==
=== Early career ===
Shevchenko began learning to skate in 2005. She was a single skater until 2013–2014 season. She then switched to ice dancing and teamed up with Igor Eremenko. They started to compete together in 2014–2015 season. They are coached by Irina Zhuk and Alexander Svinin.

Shevchenko/Eremenko placed seventh at the 2015 Russian Junior Championships.

=== 2015–2016 season ===
Shevchenko/Eremenko received their first ISU Junior Grand Prix (JGP) assignments in the 2015–2016 season. They won bronze medals at both events, competing in late August in Bratislava, Slovakia and in October in Zagreb, Croatia.

They placed seventh at the 2016 Russian Junior Championships. In February 2016, they won the junior gold medal at the Bavarian Open.

=== 2016–2017 season ===
Competing in the 2016 JGP series, Shevchenko/Eremenko placed fifth in August in Saint-Gervais-les-Bains, France, and received a bronze medal in September in Saransk, Russia.

In November 2016, they won the gold medal at the NRW Trophy. They placed sixth at the 2017 Russian Junior Championships.

=== 2017–2018 season ===
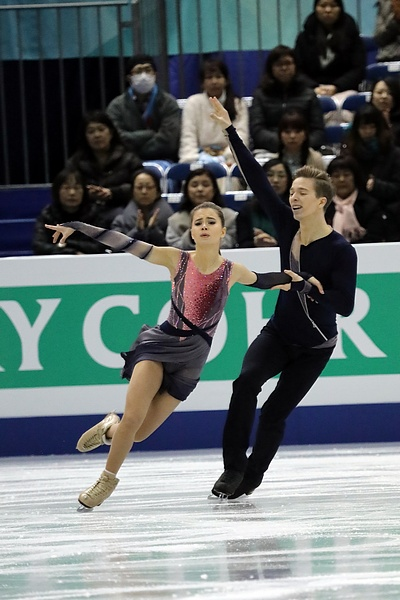
Shevchenko & Eremenko compete at the 2017–18 JGP Final

Shevchenko/Eremenko won their first JGP gold medal in September at the 2017 JGP event in Riga, Latvia. They beat the silver medalists, their teammates and training partners Anastasia Shpilevaya / Grigory Smirnov, by only about one point. Three weeks later, at their second JGP event of the season, they won the silver medal in Zagreb, Croatia. With these results they qualified for the 2017–18 ISU Junior Grand Prix Final, where they finished fourth.

In January 2018, Shevchenko/Eremenko won the silver medal at the 2018 Russian Junior Championships after placing third in the short program and second in the free skate. In March 2018, they placed fourth in the short program, fourth in the free skate, and fifth overall at the 2018 World Junior Championships in Sofia, Bulgaria.

=== 2018–2019 season ===
Shevchenko/Eremenko started their season with gold at the 2018 JGP event in Linz, Austria. They ranked first in both segments and outscored the silver medalists, Marjorie Lajoie / Zachary Lagha, by a margin of about five points. At their second JGP event of the season they won a silver medal in Ljubljana, Slovenia. With one JGP gold medal and one silver medal they qualified for the 2018–19 Junior Grand Prix Final.

At the Final, Shevchenko/Eremenko won the gold medal after placing first in the rhythm dance and second in the free dance. They were part of a Russian sweep of the ice dance podium. Shevchenko/Eremenko beat the bronze medalists, Elizaveta Khudaiberdieva / Nikita Nazarov, by about 6 points but the race for the gold medal was extremely tight. Shevchenko/Eremenko won the gold medal by a margin of only 0.01 point over the silver medalists, Arina Ushakova / Maxim Nekrasov.

Shevchenko/Eremenko faced Ushakova/Nekrasov again at the 2019 Russian Junior Championships, and again prevailed, winning gold with first-place finishes in both segments. They concluded the season at the 2019 World Junior Championships, where they placed third in the rhythm dance, behind both Lajoie/Lagha and Khudaiberdieva/Nazarov, having achieved only a Level 1 on the second part of the tango pattern dance. Shevchenko/Eremenko placed second in the free dance, but this was insufficient to overcome Khudaiberdieva/Nazarov's lead from the rhythm dance, and they won the bronze medal. Reflecting afterward, Shevchenko said "this was an amazing season for us, so emotional, and it was the best season of our career." Eremenko noted that they would move to the senior level next.

=== 2019–2020 season ===
Shevchenko/Eremenko moved to the senior level for the 2019–2020 season.

Making their senior Grand Prix debut at 2019 Skate America, they placed ninth. They went on to win the Volvo Open Cup. They were seventh at the 2019 NHK Trophy, setting three new personal bests. At the 2020 Russian Championships, they placed sixth.

=== 2020–2021 season ===
Shevchenko/Eremenko debuted their programs at the senior Russian test skates. Competing on the domestic Cup of Russia series, they won the bronze medal at the first stage in Syzran. They were scheduled to compete on the Grand Prix at the 2020 Rostelecom Cup, but withdrew after a COVID-19 outbreak at their training center.

Competing at the 2021 Russian Championships, Shevchenko/Eremenko placed fifth in both segments of the competition, for fourth place overall due to volatility from other competitors.

Following the national championships, Shevchenko/Eremenko participated in the 2021 Channel One Trophy, a televised team competition held in lieu of the cancelled European Championships. They were selected for the Time of Firsts team captained by Evgenia Medvedeva. They placed sixth in both their segments of the competition, while their team finished in second overall.

=== 2021–2022 season ===
Despite being eligible, Shevchenko/Eremenko were not included among the initial assignments for the 2021–22 Grand Prix series. Eremenko publicly protested this, as a number of lower-ranked Russian dance teams had been selected. They subsequently withdrew from the Russian test skates, citing medical reasons. They were subsequently invited to the 2021 NHK Trophy to replace withdrawn Chinese team Wang/Liu, and placed ninth at the event.

== Programs ==
(with Eremenko)

Season	Rhythm dance	Free dance
2021–2022	I Feel Like I'm Drowning (Royal Family Mix) by Two Feet'	Heaven I Know by Gordi; Trio No. 1 in D by Kirill Richter; Rise of the Instruments by Balázs Havasi
2020–2021	Foxtrot: Express; Quickstep: Show Me How You Burlesque by Christina Aguilera (from Burlesque)	The Illusionist by Maxime Rodriguez
2019–2020	Foxtrot: Express; Quickstep: Show Me How You Burlesque by Christina Aguilera (from Burlesque)	Mechanisms by Kirill Richter; Give Us A Little Love by Fallulah; Steppe by René Aubry
2018–2019	Tango: La cumparsita by Gerardo Matos Rodríguez	Intro by Onuka; Witchdoctor by Camo & Krooked; Lijo by Alina Orlova
	Short dance	
2017–2018	Cha Cha: Let's Cha Cha by MC Mario; Samba: Happy by Max Sedgley	Heart Cry by Drehz; La Boulange by Yann Tiersen
2016–2017	Blues: Seven Nation Army by Postmodern Jukebox; Swing: Is That Too Much To Ask by Biboulakis, Nina Zeitlin	Barra Limpa by Louis Enrique; Chanson d'Amour by Denise Castle; Samba in Your Casa by Matt Bianco
2015–2016	Waltz: Les Valses de Vienne by François Feldman; Foxtrot: Do Your Thing by Pure Energy	The Pink Panther by Henry Mancini choreo. by Irina Zhuk
2014–2015		

== Competitive highlights ==
JGP: Junior Grand Prix

=== With Ezhlov ===
National
Event	23–24	24–25	25-26
Russian Champ.	11th	9th	12th
Russian Cup Final	6th		
TBD = Assigned; WD = Withdrew

=== With Eremenko ===
International
Event	14–15	15–16	16–17	17–18	18–19	19–20	20–21	21–22
GP NHK Trophy						7th		9th
GP Rostelecom Cup							WD	
GP Skate America						9th		
CS Finlandia								WD
Volvo Open Cup						1st		
International: Junior
Junior Worlds				5th	3rd			
JGP Final				4th	1st			
JGP Austria					1st			
JGP Croatia		3rd		2nd				
JGP France			5th					
JGP Latvia				1st				
JGP Russia			3rd					
JGP Slovakia		3rd						
JGP Slovenia					2nd			
Alpen Trophy					1st J			
Bavarian Open		1st J						
Ice Star				1st J				
NRW Trophy			1st J					
Volvo Open Cup				1st J				
National
Russian Champ.						6th	4th	WD
Russian Jr. Champ.	7th	7th	6th	2nd	1st			
J = Junior level; TBD = Assigned

== Detailed results ==
Small medals for short and free programs awarded only at ISU Championships.

With Eremenko

2021–22 season
Date	Event	RD	FD	Total
12–14 November 2021	2021 NHK Trophy	9; 65.17	9; 95.96	9; 160.13
2020–21 season
Date	Event	RD	FD	Total
5–7 February 2021	2021 Channel One Trophy	6; 79.04	6; 120.57	2T/6P; 199.61
23–27 December 2020	2021 Russian Championships	5; 77.83	5; 116.46	4; 194.29
5–8 December 2020	2020 Cup of Russia Series, 5th Stage, Moscow domestic competition	2; 76.39	2; 114.43	2; 190.82
20–22 November 2020	2020 Rostelecom Cup	WD	WD	WD
18–22 September 2020	2020 Cup of Russia Series, 1st Stage, Syzran domestic competition	3; 72.18	3; 108.97	3; 181.15
2019–20 season
Date	Event	RD	FD	Total
24–29 December 2019	2020 Russian Championships	7; 70.48	6; 111.19	6; 181.67
22–24 November 2019	2019 NHK Trophy	7; 69.59	5; 108.49	7; 178.08
5–10 November 2019	2019 Volvo Open Cup	1; 77.40	1; 117.11	1; 194.51
18–20 October 2019	2019 Skate America	9; 66.79	8; 99.72	9; 166.51

2018–2019 season
Date	Event	Level	RD	FD	Total
4–10 March 2019	2019 World Junior Championships	Junior	3; 67.56	2; 102.87	3; 170.43
1–4 February 2019	2019 Russian Junior Championships	Junior	1; 73.03	1; 111.94	1; 184.97
6–9 December 2018	2018–19 JGP Final	Junior	1; 67.73	2; 102.93	1; 170.66
11–18 November 2018	2018 Alpen Trophy	Junior	1; 66.83	1; 101.97	1; 168.80
3–6 October 2018	2018 JGP Slovenia	Junior	2; 63.79	2; 97.88	2; 161.67
29 August – 1 September 2018	2018 JGP Austria	Junior	1; 64.26	1; 94.44	1; 158.70
2017–2018 season
Date	Event	Level	SD	FD	Total
5–11 March 2018	2018 World Junior Championships	Junior	4; 60.95	4; 84.90	5; 145.85
23–26 January 2018	2018 Russian Junior Championships	Junior	3; 63.69	2; 91.28	2; 154.97
7–10 December 2017	2017–18 JGP Final	Junior	5; 60.10	4; 84.28	4; 144.38
8–12 November 2017	2017 Volvo Open Cup	Junior	1; 61.85	1; 85.67	1; 147.52
26–29 October 2017	2017 Minsk-Arena Ice Star	Junior	1; 60.20	1; 82.83	1; 143.03
27–30 September 2017	2017 JGP Croatia	Junior	3; 59.97	2; 85.08	2; 145.05
6–9 September 2017	2017 JGP Latvia	Junior	2; 58.87	1; 82.04	1; 140.91
2016–2017 season
Date	Event	Level	SD	FD	Total
1–5 February 2017	2017 Russian Junior Championships	Junior	6; 56.40	6; 83.48	6; 139.88
4–6 November 2016	2016 NRW Trophy	Junior	1; 56.60	1; 81.68	1; 138.28
14–18 September 2016	2016 JGP Russia	Junior	3; 57.88	3; 83.79	3; 141.67
24–27 August 2016	2016 JGP France	Junior	3; 56.20	5; 77.32	5; 133.52
2015–2016 season
Date	Event	Level	SD	FD	Total
17–21 February 2016	2016 Bavarian Open	Junior	1; 60.68	1; 82.42	1; 143.10
19–23 January 2016	2016 Russian Junior Championships	Junior	6; 59.59	8; 79.72	7; 139.31
7–10 October 2015	2015 JGP Croatia	Junior	3; 57.80	4; 86.07	3; 143.87
19–22 August 2015	2015 JGP Slovakia	Junior	3; 58.04	3; 80.80	3; 138.84
2014–2015 season
Date	Event	Level	SD	FD	Total
4–7 February 2015	2015 Russian Junior Championships	Junior	7; 49.39	9; 70.93	7; 120.32
