= Elizaveta Khudaiberdieva =

Russian ice dancer (born 2002)

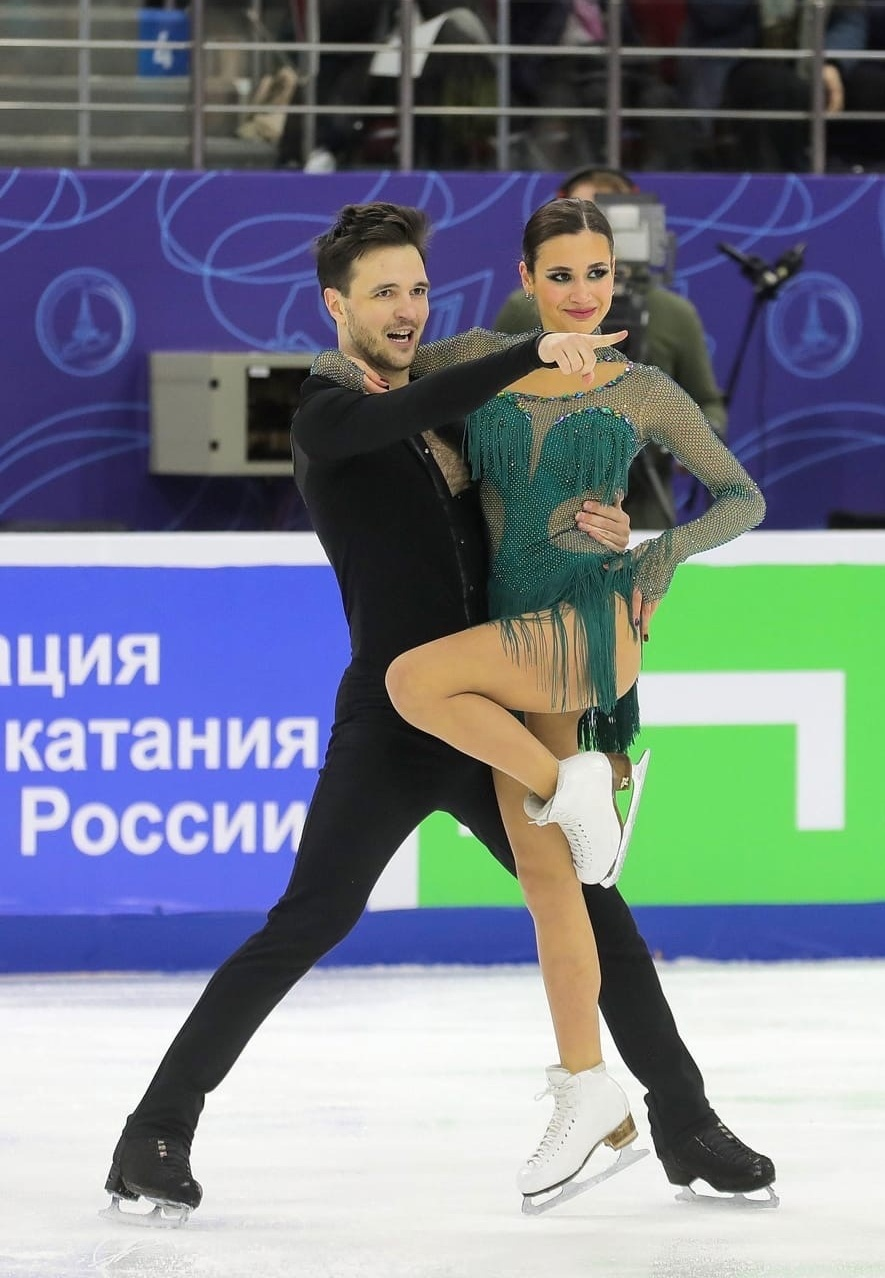
- Khudaiberdieva / Bazin at the 5th stage of the Russian Grand Prix 2022

Personal information
- Native name: Елизавета Хасанжоновна Худайбердиева
- Full name: Elizaveta Khasanzhonovna Khudaiberdieva
- Born: 2 October 2002 (age 24) Mytishchi, Russia
- Height: 1.69 m (5 ft 6 1/2 in)

Figure skating career
- Country: Russia
- Partner: Egor Bazin
- Coach: Alexander Zhulin
- Skating club: Olimpiets Balashikha Moscow
- Began skating: 2006
- Retired: April 21, 2025
Medal record
Representing Russia
Figure skating: Ice dancing
World Junior Championships
Silver medal – second place	2019 Zagreb	Ice dancing
Junior Grand Prix Final
Bronze medal – third place	2018–19 Vancouver	Ice dancing

Elizaveta Khasanzhonovna Khudaiberdieva (Russian: Елизавета Хасанжоновна Худайбердиева, born 2 October 2002) is a retired Russian ice dancer. With her current skating partner, Egor Bazin, she is the 2023 Russian champion, 2022 Russian national bronze medalist.

With her former skating partner, Nikita Nazarov, she is the 2019 World Junior silver medalist and the 2018–19 Junior Grand Prix Final bronze medalist. She also won four gold medals on the ISU Junior Grand Prix series, two with Nazarov and two with Andrei Filatov.

== Personal life ==
Elizaveta Khudaiberdieva was born on 2 October 2002 in Mytishchi, Russia. Her mother is Russian and her father is Uzbek.

On 27 February 2022, she married the producer of Channel One Kirill Blagov.

== Career ==
=== Early career ===
Khudaiberdieva began learning to skate in 2006. She was a single skater until 2015–2016 season. She then switched to ice dancing and teamed up with Nikita Nazarov. They started to compete together in 2016–2017 season. They were coached by Denis Samokhin and Maria Borovikova.

=== 2016–2017 season ===
Khudaiberdieva/Nazarov made their international junior debut in January 2017 at the 2017 Toruń Cup, where they won the gold medal.

They placed 8th at the 2017 Russian Junior Championships.

=== 2017–2018 season ===
Khudaiberdieva/Nazarov received their first ISU Junior Grand Prix (JGP) assignments in the 2017–2018 season. They won medals at both JGP events, first a bronze medal in late August in Brisbane, Australia and then the silver medal in October in Gdańsk, Poland.

They placed fifth at the 2018 Russian Junior Championships after placing second in the short dance and sixth in the free dance.

=== 2018–2019 season: World Junior silver medal ===
Khudaiberdieva/Nazarov won their first JGP gold medal in August at the 2018 JGP event in Bratislava, Slovakia, after placing first in both the rhythm dance and the free dance. They scored their personal best score of 159.62 points, and they beat the silver medalists, Shanaeva/Naryzhnyy, by about seven points. Their rhythm dance, free dance, and combined total scores at this competition were the highest scores achieved in an international junior ice dance competition at the time, subsequently surpassed by others.

At their second JGP event of the season in Ostrava, Czech Republic, they won a second gold medal. Again they were ranked first in both the rhythm dance and the free dance. With two JGP gold medals, they qualified for the 2018–19 Junior Grand Prix Final. At the Final, Khudaiberdieva/Nazarov won the bronze medal after placing third in the rhythm dance and fourth in the free dance. They were part of a Russian sweep of the ice dance podium. Khudaiberdieva/Nazarov were about 6 points behind both the gold medalists, Shevchenko/Eremenko and the silver medalists, Ushakova/Nekrasov, who were separated by only a 0.01 point. Khudaiberdieva/Nazarov won the bronze medal over Canadians Lajoie/Lagha, who placed fourth by a margin of only 0.03 points.

After winning the bronze medal at the 2019 Russian Junior Championships, Khudaiberdieva/Nazarov concluded the season at the 2019 World Junior Championships. They placed second in the rhythm dance, winning a silver small medal and unexpectedly beating their Russian teammates due to superior results on the tango pattern dance. They came fourth in the free dance but remained in second place overall, winning the silver medal. Khudaiberdieva said the result was not something they had expected, as "we were the number three Russian team, a confident number three though. For us, it was more about overcoming ourselves than anyone else. We haven’t realized yet that we are second at our first Junior Worlds." Noting that it was their final junior season, Nazarov said, "there are many teams in Russia, but if you look at the results at major events, they are not that great. But all these teams also once came up from juniors. We just have to work very hard in order to achieve something."

On 13 May 2019, it was announced that Khudaiberdieva and Nazarov had split.

=== 2019–2020 season: Debut of Khudaiberdieva/Filatov ===
Khudaiberdieva teamed up with Andrei Filatov in late April 2019. The team made their international junior debut in September 2019 at the 2019 JGP event in Riga, Latvia, where they won the gold medal. They placed first in the rhythm dance and second in the free dance, winning over the silver medalists, Georgian team Kazakova/Reviya, by about 0.3 points.

The pair were withdrawn from their second event, JGP Poland, due to a medical problem and were reassigned to the final Junior Grand Prix stage of the season, JGP Italy. In Egna, they again won gold and qualified for 2019–20 ISU Junior Grand Prix Final, where they finished fourth. Khudaiberdieva/Filatov did not compete again until February 2020 at the 2020 Russian Junior Nationals, where they finished just off the podium in fourth, thus narrowly missing being named to the team for the 2020 World Junior Figure Skating Championships.

In May 2020, Khudaiberdieva was listed as a member of the Russian senior national figure skating team with a new partner, two-time Winter Universiade silver medalist Egor Bazin, marking the end of her partnership with Filatov and her advancement to the senior ranks. Khudaiberdieva/Bazin were to be coached in Balashikha by a hybrid team of Khudaiberdieva's coaches, Denis Samokhin and Maria Borovikova, and Bazin's coach, Oleg Sudakov.

=== 2020–2021 season: Debut of Khudaiberdieva/Bazin ===
Khudaiberdieva/Bazin made their debut at the senior Russian test skates, where Bazin fell on a twizzle in the free dance. They made their competitive debut at the first stage of the domestic Russian Cup series, the qualifying competition series to the 2021 Russian Figure Skating Championships, in Syzran in September. They placed first in the rhythm dance and second in the free dance to narrowly win the gold medal ahead of Morozov/Bagin. At their next event, the third stage held in Sochi, the team placed second in both the rhythm dance and the free dance to take second overall behind reigning national bronze medalists Zahorski/Guerreiro.

In November, Khudaiberdieva/Bazin made their international debut at the 2020 Rostelecom Cup, where they placed fifth in the rhythm dance, just narrowly behind Morozov/Bagin. In the free dance, Khudaiberdieva/Bazin managed to overtake Morozov/Bagin by a little less than three points to place fourth in the free dance and fourth overall.

Competing at their first senior Russian Championships together (and Khudaiberdieva's first), they placed fourth in the rhythm dance despite a twizzle wobble from Bazin that earned him only a level 2 on that element. In the free dance, Khudaiberdieva stumbled on her twizzle sequence, placing them sixth in that segment and fifth overall.

Following the national championships, Khudaiberdieva/Bazin participated in the 2021 Channel One Trophy, a televised team competition held in lieu of the cancelled European Championships. They were selected for the Red Machine team captained by Alina Zagitova. They placed fifth in both their segments of the competition, while their team finished first overall.

=== 2021–2022 season ===
Khudaiberdieva/Bazin began the season at the 2021 CS Denis Ten Memorial Challenge, where they won the bronze medal and then took gold at the Volvo Open Cup. In their lone Grand Prix assignment, they were eighth at the 2021 Rostelecom Cup.

At the 2022 Russian Championships, Khudaiberdieva/Bazin placed sixth in the rhythm dance. In the free dance, following the withdrawal of top team Sinitsina/Katsalapov due to injury, Khudaiberdieva/Bazin moved up to the bronze medal with a third place in that segment. Bazin said afterward, "not only one couple tried to qualify for the Olympics, everyone tried. We want to at least have a chance to fight a little bit." This was widely interpreted as querying the validity of the scores for controversial silver medalists Davis/Smolkin.

Khudaiberdieva/Bazin announced their retirement from competitive ice dance in April 2025.

== Programs ==
=== With Bazin ===
Season	Rhythm dance	Free dance	Exhibition
2022–2023	California Dreamin' performed by José Feliciano; I Like It Like That by Tony Pabón and Manny Rodriguez; De Donde Soy by Thalía	Sweet Dreams by Eurythmics choreo. by Eva Uvarova	
2021–2022	Blues: Come Together performed by Gary Clark Jr. and Junkie XL; Disco: It's Raining Men performed by Geri Halliwell	Lose Yourself performed by David Garrett; Rain, In Your Black Eyes by Ezio Bosso	
2020–2021	Charleston: George Valentin (from The Artist); Quickstep: Sing, Sing, Sing by Benny Goodman	Experience by Ludovico Einaudi; Ni**as in Paris (Piano) by Jay-Z and Kanye West	Charlie Chaplin medley

=== With Filatov ===
Season	Rhythm dance	Free dance
2019–2020	Foxtrot: City of Stars performed by Emma Stone and Ryan Gosling; Waltz: Epilogue (from La La Land) by Justin Hurwitz choreo. by Nikolai Nikonov, Anastasia Kozhevnikova	Sign of the Times by Harry Styles choreo. by Nikolai Nikonov, Anastasia Kozhevnikova

=== With Nazarov ===
Season	Rhythm dance	Free dance
2018–2019	Tango: Tango Amore by Edvin Marton	Human (Acoustic); Human by Rag'n'Bone Man; Nemesis by Benjamin Clementine
	Short dance	
2017–2018	Cha Cha: Suavemente; Samba:	Ghost the Musical by David A. Stewart, Glen Ballard
2016–2017	You Can Leave Your Hat On; Worth It by Fifth Harmony, Kid Ink	Let It Be; Fix You

== Competitive highlights ==
GP: Grand Prix; CS: Challenger Series; JGP: Junior Grand Prix

=== With Bazin ===
International
Event	20–21	21–22	22–23	23–24	24–25
GP Rostelecom Cup	4th	8th			
CS Denis Ten Memorial		3rd			
CS Cup of Austria		WD			
Volvo Open Cup		1st			
National
Russian Championships	5th	3rd	1st	2nd	2nd
Russian Cup Final				2nd	
TBD = Assigned

=== With Filatov ===
International
Event	2019–20
JGP Final	4th
JGP Italy	1st
JGP Latvia	1st
National
Russian Junior Champ.	4th

=== With Nazarov ===
International
Event	2016–17	2017–18	2018–19
Junior Worlds			2nd
JGP Final			3rd
JGP Australia		3rd	
JGP Czech Republic			1st
JGP Poland		2nd	
JGP Slovakia			1st
Halloween Cup			1st
Tallinn Trophy		2nd	1st
Toruń Cup	1st		
National
Russian Jr. Champ.	8th	5th	3rd

== Detailed results ==
Small medals for short and free programs awarded only at ISU Championships.

=== With Bazin ===
2021–2022 season
Date	Event	RD	FD	Total
21–26 December 2021	2022 Russian Championships	6; 77.91	3; 117.84	3; 195.75
26–28 November 2021	2021 Rostelecom Cup	8; 71.05	7; 106.46	8; 177.51
3–7 November 2021	2021 Volvo Open Cup	1; 75.48	1; 110.13	1; 185.61
28–31 October 2021	2021 Denis Ten Memorial Challenge	2; 77.08	3; 109.72	3; 186.80
2020–2021 season
Date	Event	RD	FD	Total
5–7 February 2021	2021 Channel One Trophy	5; 79.13	5; 123.09	1T/5P; 202.22
23–27 December 2020	2021 Russian Championships	4; 78.01	6; 114.67	5; 192.68
20–22 November 2020	2020 Rostelecom Cup	5; 76.10	4; 117.08	4; 193.18
23–27 October 2020	2020 Cup of Russia Series, 3rd Stage, Sochi domestic competition	2; 79.29	2; 117.71	2; 197.00
18–22 September 2020	2020 Cup of Russia Series, 1st Stage, Syzran domestic competition	1; 78.19	2; 117.68	1; 195.87

=== With Filatov ===
2019–2020 season
Date	Event	Level	RD	FD	Total
4–8 February 2020	2020 Russian Junior Championships	Junior	4; 66.16	4; 105.22	4; 171.38
5–8 December 2019	2019–20 Junior Grand Prix Final	Junior	4; 65.07	4; 97.96	4; 163.03
2–5 October 2019	2019 JGP Italy	Junior	1; 65.52	1; 99.40	1; 164.92
4–7 September 2019	2019 JGP Latvia	Junior	1; 65.13	2; 100.46	1; 165.59

=== With Nazarov ===
2018–2019 season
Date	Event	Level	RD	FD	Total
4–10 March 2019	2019 World Junior Championships	Junior	2; 68.69	4; 102.53	2; 171.22
1–4 February 2019	2019 Russian Junior Championships	Junior	3; 69.89	3; 106.96	3; 176.85
6–9 December 2018	2018–19 JGP Final	Junior	3; 66.29	4; 98.25	3; 164.54
26 Nov. – 2 Dec. 2018	2018 Tallinn Trophy	Junior	1; 66.04	1; 97.79	1; 163.83
19–21 October 2018	2018 Halloween Cup	Junior	1; 62.79	1; 96.82	1; 159.61
26–29 September 2018	2018 JGP Czech Republic	Junior	1; 65.29	1; 95.71	1; 161.00
22–25 August 2018	2018 JGP Slovakia	Junior	1; 64.39	1; 95.23	1; 159.62
2017–2018 season
Date	Event	Level	SD	FD	Total
23–26 January 2018	2018 Russian Junior Championships	Junior	2; 63.99	6; 85.22	5; 149.21
15–17 December 2017	2017 Grand Prix of Bratislava	Junior	1; 60.87	1; 84.47	1; 145.34
21–26 November 2017	2017 Tallinn Trophy	Junior	2; 61.57	2; 84.36	2; 145.93
4–7 October 2017	2017 JGP Poland	Junior	2; 59.03	3; 74.82	2; 133.85
23–26 August 2017	2017 JGP Australia	Junior	3; 57.25	4; 74.55	3; 131.80
2016–2017 season
Date	Event	Level	SD	FD	Total
1–5 February 2017	2017 Russian Junior Championships	Junior	9; 52.71	7; 82.30	8; 135.01
10–15 January 2017	2017 Toruń Cup	Junior	2; 51.69	1; 80.70	1; 132.39

World Junior Record Holders
Preceded by (Russia) Elizaveta Shanaeva / Devid Naryzhnyy	Junior Rhythm Dance; 24 August 2018 – 7 September 2018	Succeeded by (Russia) Arina Ushakova / Maxim Nekrasov
Preceded by (Russia) Elizaveta Shanaeva / Devid Naryzhnyy	Junior Free Dance; 25 August 2018 – 8 September 2018	Succeeded by (Russia) Arina Ushakova / Maxim Nekrasov
Preceded by (Russia) Elizaveta Shanaeva / Devid Naryzhnyy	Junior Ice Dance Total Score; 25 August 2018 – 8 September 2018	Succeeded by (Russia) Arina Ushakova / Maxim Nekrasov
