= Anastasia Tarakanova =

Russian figure skater

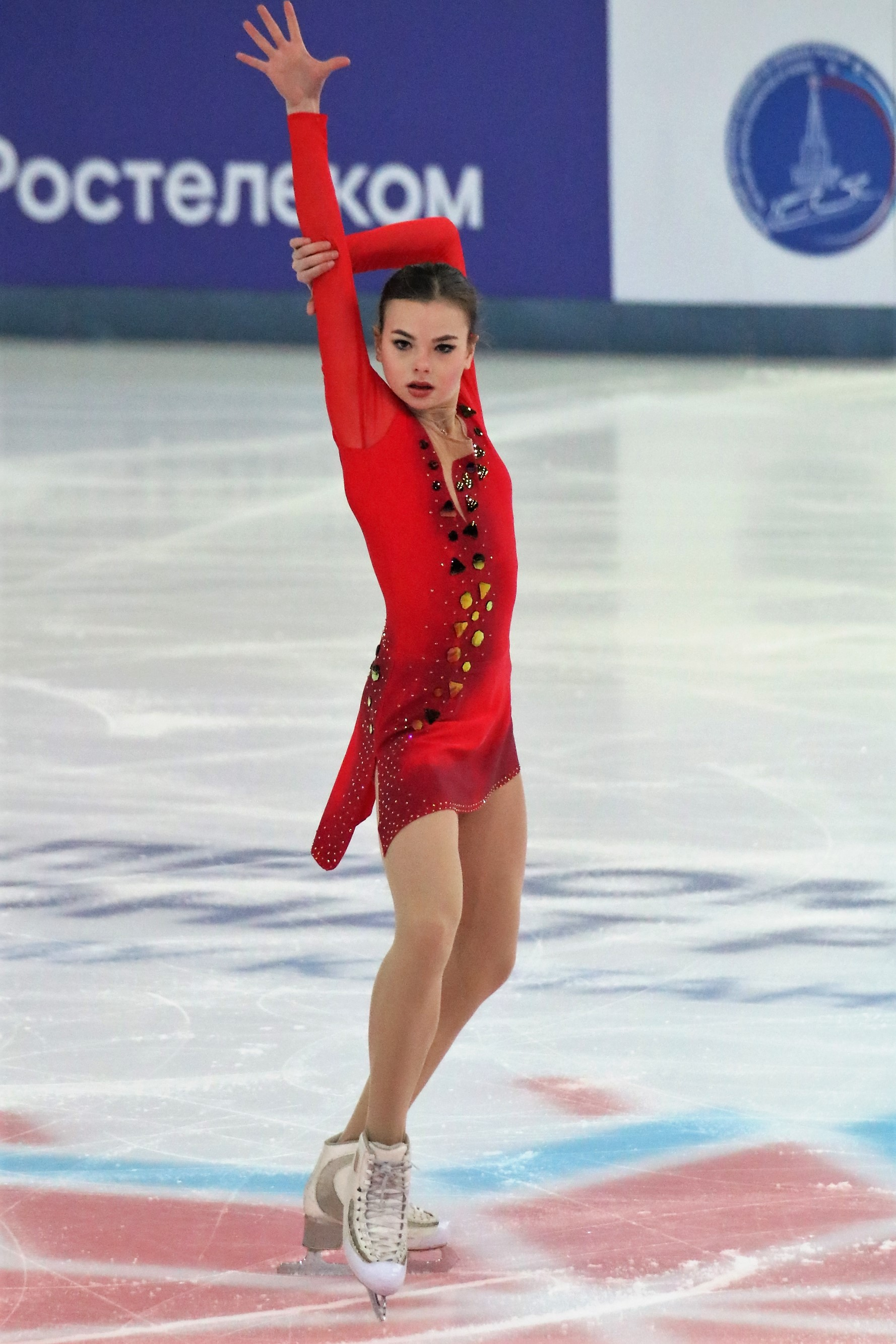
- Tarakanova at the 2019 Russian National Championships

Personal information
- Native name: Анастасия Анатольевна Тараканова (Russian)
- Full name: Anastasia Anatolyevna Tarakanova
- Born: 14 April 2004 (age 22) Volgograd, Volgograd Oblast, Russia
- Home town: Moscow, Russia
- Height: 1.54 m (5 ft 1/2 in)

Figure skating career
- Country: Russia
- Coach: Ksenia Ivanova, Adian Pitkeev
- Began skating: 2008
- Retired: July 2021
Medal record
Representing Russia
Figure skating: Ladies' singles
Junior Grand Prix Final
Bronze medal – third place	2017–18 Nagoya	Ladies' singles

Anastasia Anatolyevna Tarakanova (Russian: Анастасия Анатольевна Тараканова; born 14 April 2004) is a Russian retired figure skater. She is the 2017 JGP Austria and 2018 JGP Slovenia champion, and the 2017–18 JGP Final bronze medalist. She has won seven medals on the ISU Junior Grand Prix series.

== Personal life ==
Tarakanova was born on 14 April 2004 in Volgograd, Russia. Her father is a swimmer and her mother is also an athlete. Due to her allergies, she was advised by a doctor to skate or swim. She tried both sports and won her first swimming competition as the youngest competitor, receiving her trophy from three-time Olympic gold medalist Yevgeny Sadovyi. She eventually chose to focus on skating, considering it beautiful and enjoying the support of the audience. She also enjoys drawing for leisure.

== Career ==
=== Early years ===
Tarakanova began learning to skate in December 2007. She learned her basics with Lyudmila Puchkova and a year before leaving Volgograd, she went to train with Irina Aksenova.

In 2011, Tarakanova moved to Moscow due to her father's work. Her first coach in Moscow was Irina Klimova, who was a student of the famous Stanislav Zhuk. She then switched to coach Maria Butyrskaya, World Figure Skating Champion. Later, she moved from Krylatskoye to Novokosino and Snow Leopards was a nearby rink and she went to train under Svetlana Panova.

=== 2014–2015 season: Younger age national title ===
Tarakanova began competing her double axels early the season and placed third at Volkov Memorial. Later that season, Tarakanova eventually gained all her triples and competed at Moscow Championships Elder Age with a sixth-place finish, earning her a spot at Russian Nationals Elder Age, where she finished 5th after Polina Tsurskaya, Alisa Fedichkina, Alina Solovyova and Stanislava Konstantinova. She went on to win the Moscow Championships Younger Age. Her highlight of the season was her win at Russian Nationals Younger age, where she earned 198.22 points, edging out silver medalist Anna Shcherbakova by 24.54 points and bronze medalist Alexandra Trusova by 24.71 points.

=== 2015–2016 season: Junior national debut ===
Tarakanova started off her season with a fifth place at Moscow Open Championship. She then experimented her triple-triple combination at Volkov Memorial, where she placed second. She earned herself 2 spots at the IV & V Stages of Cup of Russia and had two 4th-place finishes. She then earned her ticket to the Russian Junior Nationals as the youngest competitor. However, she had pops and falls in both the short program and free skate which left her placing sixteenth overall. She competed at Russian Cup Finals placing ninth. She also competed at both Moscow Championships Younger & Elder age, but only placed seventh and thirteenth respectively and missing out on both Russian Nationals Younger & Elder Age.

=== 2016–2017 season: Nationals Younger Age & Elder Age Titles ===
Tarakanova completed a triple Lutz-triple toe combination at the Moscow Open Championship and finished fifth at the competition. She placed fourth and third respectively at the I & V stages of Cup of Russia and qualified for Russian Junior Nationals, where she placed fourteenth. At the Russian Cup Final, she placed fourth. She won gold at the Russian Nationals Younger Age, placing ahead of Anna Shcherbakova and Alexandra Trusova with a score of 246.18 points. She then went on to win the Russian Nationals Elder Age.

=== 2017–2018 season: Junior International Debut ===
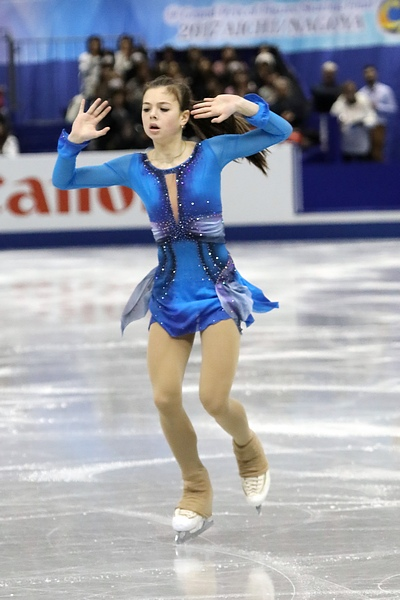
Tarakanova at the 2017-2018 ISU Junior Grand Prix Final

Tarakanova changed coaches ahead of the season, joining Eteri Tutberidze and Sergei Dudakov, who also coach in Moscow.

Tarakanova's international debut came in early September 2017 at a 2017–18 ISU Junior Grand Prix (JGP) competition in Salzburg, Austria; ranked first in both segments, she won the gold medal ahead of Lim Eun-soo. Her total score at the event, 196.68 points, was the fifth highest ever achieved by a ladies' single skater on the junior level. She placed third at her second JGP assignment, in Zagreb, Croatia. With these results she qualified for the 2017–18 JGP Final in Nagoya, Japan. At the JGP Final she won the bronze medal with a personal best score of 199.64 points after placing 3rd in the short program and 3rd in the free skate. At this competition she placed behind her teammates and training partners Alexandra Trusova (gold) and Alena Kostornaia (silver).

In January 2018 she competed at the 2018 Russian Junior Championships where she placed seventh after placing fourth in the short program and seventh in the free skate.

=== 2018–2019 season ===
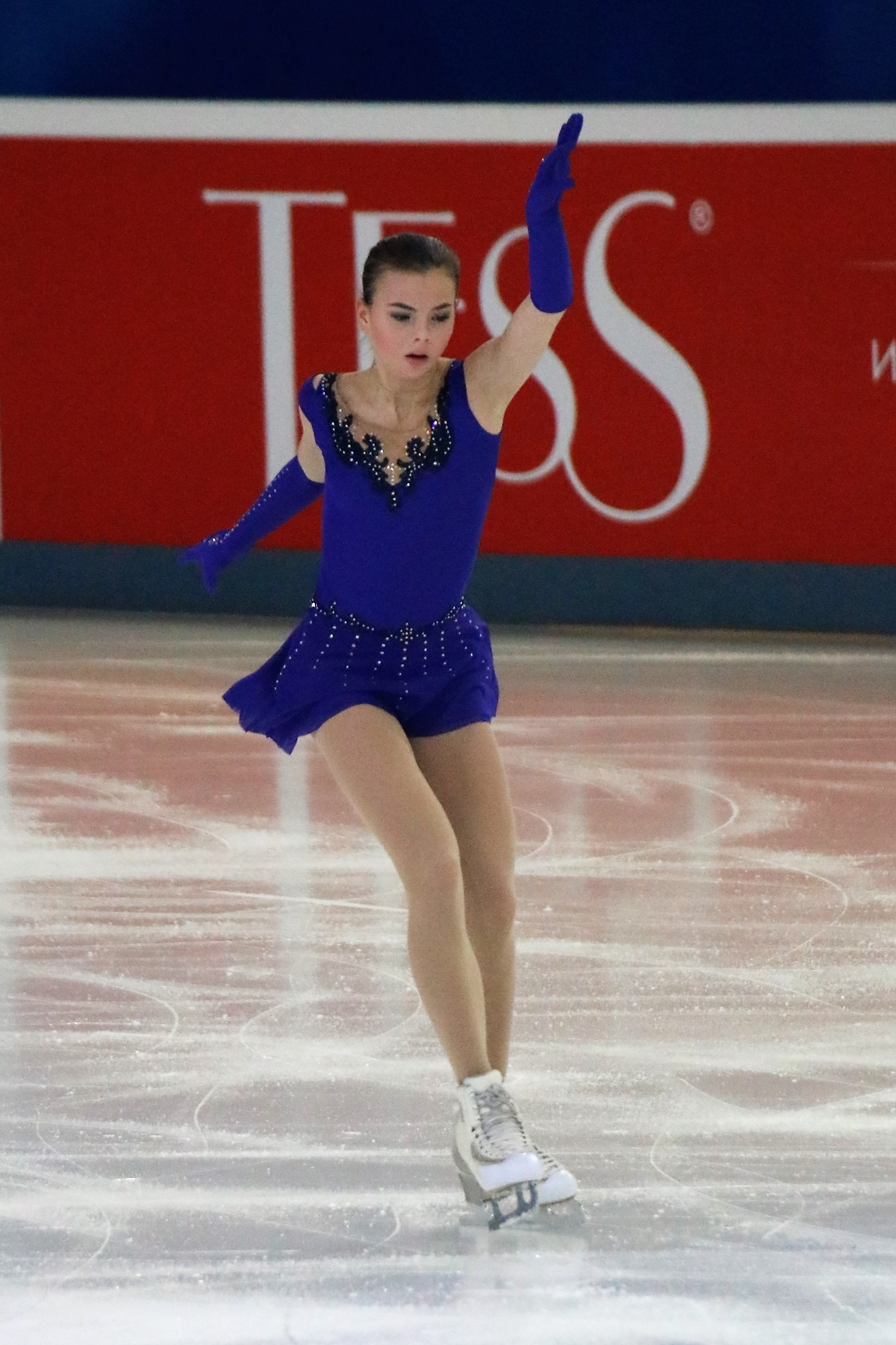
Tarakanova at the 2019 Russian Figure Skating Championships

During the 2018–19 season, starting in July 2018, Tarakanova trained at Evgeni Plushenko's rink under coach Ksenia Ivanova.

Tarakanova started her season by competing in the 2018 JGP series. At her first JGP event of the season she won the silver medal in Vancouver, Canada. She was ranked second in both the short program and the free skate and finished about 5 points behind the gold medalist, her teammate Anna Shcherbakova.

At her second JGP event of the season she won the gold medal in Ljubljana, Slovenia. She was ranked third in the short program but first in the free skate and won the gold medal by a margin of less than 2 points over the silver medalist, her teammate Anna Tarusina. With one JGP gold medal and one silver medal Tarakanova qualified for the 2018–19 Junior Grand Prix Final, where she finished fourth.

At the 2019 Russian Championships, she struggled in the short program after learning about the death of her grandmother and was in seventeenth place, second-to last, going into the free skate. She placed eighth in the free skate (and had the fourth highest TES score) after skating first out, and finished thirteenth overall. Later, at the 2019 Russian Junior Championships, she placed third in the short program but seventh overall after falling in her free skate. She decided to leave Evgeni Plushenko's school at the end of the season.

Tarakanova at the Russian Grand Prix stage in Kazan

=== 2019–2020 season ===
Prior to the start of the season, Tarakanova returned to her former coach Svetlana Panova. Since her season's best score from the previous season was not within the top 24 scores, she was not invited to the senior-level Grand Prix circuit despite being age-eligible. She was instead assigned to two competitions on the ISU Junior Grand Prix.

Tarakanova started her season off at the JGP United States where she finished in 3rd place and won the bronze medal. She placed fourth in the short program after falling on her triple lutz and failing to complete a jump combination. After a clean free skate performance, she rose to third place behind Alysa Liu of the United States and Park Yeon-jeong of South Korea, edging out Ji Seo-yeon of South Korea by only 0.06 points. Tarakanova's coach Svetlana Panova and training mate Ksenia Sinitsyna, who had intended to travel and compete alongside her in the United States, were unable to attend due to visa issues.

She then finished third at JGP Poland three weeks later. She placed first in the short program with a personal best score after landing a backloaded triple lutz-triple toeloop jump combination. She placed third in the free skate with a clean performance, and won the bronze medal behind Alysa Liu and teammate Viktoria Vasilieva. This placement marked her seventh medal on the ISU Junior Grand Prix circuit in eight attempts, but unlike the previous two seasons, she narrowly missed out on qualifying to the Junior Grand Prix Final, instead being named the third alternate for the event.

In July 2020, Tarakanova was seen training in Russian roller sports national team coach Irina Klimova's camp on social media.

=== 2020–2021 season ===
Before the start of the 2020–21 season, Tarakanova again parted ways with coach Svetlana Panova and resumed training under another former coach, Ksenia Ivanova. She opened her competitive season in November at the fourth stage of the domestic Russian Cup series, where she placed 8th in the short program. Though she managed to improve to 7th in the free skate, she remained 8th overall in the final standings. At her second Russian Cup assignment at the beginning of December, Tarakanova placed third in the short program in a condensed field of entrants after Elizaveta Tuktamysheva and Alena Kostornaia were forced to withdraw from the event due to positive COVID-19 test results. In the free skate, she finished second behind Kamila Valieva, but was narrowly overtaken in total points by Ksenia Tsibinova to place third overall. She was fourteenth at the 2021 Russian Championships.

=== Retirement ===
In July 2021, rumours began to circulate that Tarakanova had retired after she was spotted coaching a class of young students, though this was not officially confirmed by Tarakanova. In August, Tarakanova answered a question about her retirement on her TikTok account, stating she could not skate anymore for health reasons. In March 2022 she said in an interview that everything was decided by a leg injury she received back in 2019 involving a fracture that the doctors did not properly diagnose, and which she skated on for three months. As a consequence, the leg did not heal properly and caused her pain thereafter. By the time of the 2021 Russian Cup final, "...in training I felt that my leg hurt even with injections. I couldn't rotate at all." She had to withdraw from that tournament because of the pain, and eventually was forced to accept the evaluation of the doctors that her skating days were over.

== Programs ==
Season	Short program	Free skating
2020–2021	Девочка и Море (Girl and the Sea) by polnalyubvi choreo. by Adian Pitkeev	No Matter What, I Will Fight by Brian Delgado; Lacrymosa by Evanescence choreo. by Anna Novichkina
2019–2020	Man with a Harmonica (from Once Upon a Time in the West) by Ennio Morricone; The House of the Rising Sun by The Animals performed by Heavy Young Heathens choreo. by Anna Novichkina	Frida by Elliot Goldenthal choreo. by Elena Romanovskaya and Ilona Protasenya; No Matter What, I Will Fight by Brian Delgado; Lacrymosa by Evanescence choreo. by Anna Novichkina
2018–2019	Querer performed by Francesca Gagnon	Moonlight Sonata performed by E.S. Posthumus; Believer by Imagine Dragons
2017–2018	Fly; Experience performed by Ludovico Einaudi choreo. by Daniil Gleikhengauz	Sarabande Suite (Aeternae) by Globus choreo. by Daniil Gleikhengauz
2016–2017	Strange Birds performed by Birdy choreo. by Ilona Protasenia	Tore My Heart by OONA choreo. by Ilona Protasenia
2015–2016	Maktub performed by O Clone choreo. by Ilona Protasenia	Tore My Heart by OONA choreo. by Ilona Protasenia; The Addams Family choreo. by Ilona Protasenia
2014–2015	Maktub performed by O Clone choreo. by Ilona Protasenia	The Addams Family choreo. by Ilona Protasenia

== Competitive highlights ==
JGP: Junior Grand Prix

International
Event	15–16	16–17	17–18	18–19	19–20	20–21
Volvo Open Cup					WD	
International: Junior
JGP Final			3rd	4th		
JGP Austria			1st			
JGP Canada				2nd		
JGP Croatia			3rd			
JGP Poland					3rd	
JGP Slovenia				1st		
JGP U.S.					3rd	
National
Russian Champ.				13th	WD	14th
Russian Junior Champ.	16th	14th	7th	7th	WD	
Russian Cup (Kazan)						8th
Russian Cup (Moscow)						3rd
WD = Withdrew

== Detailed results ==
=== Senior level ===
2020–21 season
Date	Event	SP	FS	Total
23–27 December 2020	2021 Russian Championships	15; 55.98	13; 119.60	14; 175.58
5–8 December 2020	2020 Cup of Russia Series, 5th Stage, Moscow domestic competition	3; 64.18	2; 131.09	3; 195.27
8–12 November 2020	2020 Cup of Russia Series, 4th Stage, Kazan domestic competition	8; 58.44	7; 126.41	8; 184.75

=== Junior level ===
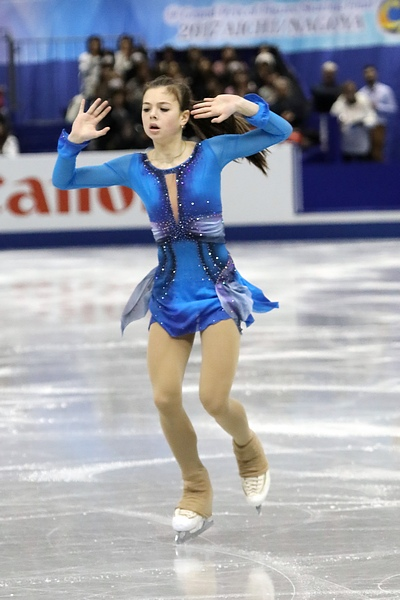
Tarakanova at the 2017–18 JGP Final.

2019–20 season
Date	Event	Level	SP	FS	Total
18–21 September 2019	2019 JGP Poland	Junior	1; 68.14	3; 126.60	3; 194.74
28–31 August 2019	2019 JGP United States	Junior	4; 58.43	3; 120.86	3; 179.29
2018–19 season
Date	Event	Level	SP	FS	Total
1–4 February 2019	2019 Russian Junior Championships	Junior	3; 73.53	7; 128.26	7; 201.79
19–23 December 2018	2019 Russian Championships	Senior	17; 59.17	8; 134.27	13; 193.44
6–9 December 2018	2018–19 JGP Final	Junior	5; 61.78	4; 128.68	4; 190.46
3–6 October 2018	2018 JGP Slovenia	Junior	3; 63.98	1; 126.07	1; 190.05
12–15 September 2018	2018 JGP Canada	Junior	2; 64.56	2; 126.13	2; 190.69
2017–18 season
Date	Event	Level	SP	FS	Total
23–26 January 2018	2018 Russian Junior Championships	Junior	4; 69.74	7; 128.64	7; 198.38
7–10 December 2017	2017–18 JGP Final	Junior	3; 67.90	3; 131.74	3; 199.64
27–30 September 2017	2017 JGP Croatia	Junior	1; 66.58	6; 98.99	3; 165.57
31 August – 2 September 2017	2017 JGP Austria	Junior	1; 66.68	1; 130.00	1; 196.68
2016–17 season
Date	Event	Level	SP	FS	Total
1–5 February 2017	2017 Russian Junior Championships	Junior	16; 53.29	14; 112.09	14; 165.38
2015–16 season
Date	Event	Level	SP	FS	Total
21–23 January 2016	2016 Russian Junior Championships	Junior	18; 47.62	14; 101.46	16; 149.08
