= Life of a Ghost =

Studio album by Blue Foundation
- Released: 24 September 2007
- Recorded: 2006–2007 in Copenhagen, Denmark
- Genre: Dream pop, indie rock, shoegaze, electronica
- Length: 52:15
- Label: Virgin Music Denmark; EMI; Astralwerks
- Producer: Bichi aka. Tobias Wilner; Bo Rande

Blue Foundation chronology
Sweep of Days (2003)	Life of a Ghost (2007)	In My Mind I Am Free (2012)

Life of a Ghost is the third full-length album by Danish band Blue Foundation. It was released on 24 September 2007 in Europe via Virgin Music Denmark/EMI and in 2009 in the USA via Astralwerks. Recording sessions took place in Copenhagen from 2006 to 2007. Production was handled by Blue Foundation members Tobias Wilner and Bo Rande. The album peaked at number 12 in Denmark.

The song "Eyes On Fire" peaked at number 49 on the Billboard Heatseekers Songs chart, and was featured on the soundtrack to the 2008 film Twilight. "Eyes On Fire" was also remixed by Zeds Dead in 2009.

== Track listing ==
No.	Title	Lyrics	Music	Length
1.	"Stuck in a Hard Place"	S. Martingell; T. Wilner	T. Wilner; B. Rande; S. Martingell	5:12
2.	"Enemy"	K. Teglbjærg	T. Wilner; B. Rande; K. Teglbjærg; S. Martin	3:31
3.	"Eyes on Fire"	K. Teglbjærg	T. Wilner; K. Teglbjærg	5:02
4.	"Distant Dreams"	S. Martingell	T. Wilner; B. Rande	4:39
5.	"Little by Little"	S. Martingell; K. Teglbjærg	T. Wilner; K. Teglbjærg	3:38
6.	"Stained"	T. Wilner	T. Wilner; B. Rande	3:32
7.	"Ghost"	K. Teglbjærg	T. Wilner; B. Rande; K. Teglbjærg	4:15
8.	"Talk to Me"	K. Teglbjærg	T. Wilner; B. Rande; K. Teglbjærg; S. Martin	3:41
9.	"Empty Wall"	T. Wilner	T. Wilner; B. Rande	3:16
10.	"Hero Across the Sky"	S. Martingell; T. Wilner	T. Wilner; B. Rande	5:15
11.	"Watch You Sleeping"	K. Teglbjærg	T. Wilner; B. Rande; K. Teglbjærg	6:33
12.	"Equilibrium"	S. Martingell	T. Wilner	3:41
Total length:				52:15

== Personnel ==
- Tobias "Bichi" Wilner – main artist, lyrics & vocals (tracks: 1, 6, 9, 10), backing vocals (tracks: 2–5, 7, 11, 12), electric guitar (tracks: 1–4, 7, 8, 10–12), synthesizer (tracks: 1–3, 5, 6, 8, 12), drum programming (tracks: 1, 4, 7), acoustic guitar (tracks: 2, 4–6, 8, 10–12), bass (track 4), banjo (tracks: 7, 8), arranger, producer
- Kirstine Stubbe Teglbjærg – main artist, lyrics (tracks: 2, 3, 5, 7, 8, 11), vocals (tracks: 2, 3, 5, 7, 8, 11, 12), backing vocals (tracks: 1, 4, 10)
- Scott "MC Jabber" Martingell – main artist, lyrics (tracks: 1, 4, 5, 10, 12), vocals (tracks: 1, 4, 5, 12)
- Bo Rande – main artist, backing vocals (tracks: 1, 3, 6, 9, 11, 12), synthesizer (tracks: 1–10, 12), piano (tracks: 1, 5–9, 11, 12), organ (track 2), chimes (tracks: 2, 5), horns (tracks: 3, 5, 7, 9, 10), harmonium (track 3), glockenspiel (tracks: 4, 10), flute (tracks: 6, 10), kalimba & trumpet (track 12), arranger, producer
- Sune Martin – main artist, bass (tracks: 1–3, 5, 8, 10–12), electric guitar (track 8)
- Tatsuki Oshima – main artist, turntables (tracks: 1, 2, 4, 6, 9, 12)
- Nikolaj Bundvig – drums (tracks: 1–8, 10–12), percussion (tracks: 1, 2, 4, 7, 8, 11, 12)
- Mathias Hantho – violin (tracks: 3, 8)
- Mathias Friis-Hansen – marimba (tracks: 6, 9, 11)
- Tine Rehling – harp (tracks: 8, 9, 12)
- Ab Mannov – electric guitar (track 10)
- Lukas Bjørn Rande – soprano & tenor saxophone (track 10)
- Richard Lowe – mixing
- Aske Jørgensen – engineering
- Simon Davey – mastering
- Kent Baker – photography
- Jan-Erik Stig – A&R
- Jesper Graugaard – management

== Charts ==
Chart (2007)	Peak position
Danish Albums (Hitlisten)	12
