= Alena Kostornaia =

Russian figure skater (born 2003)

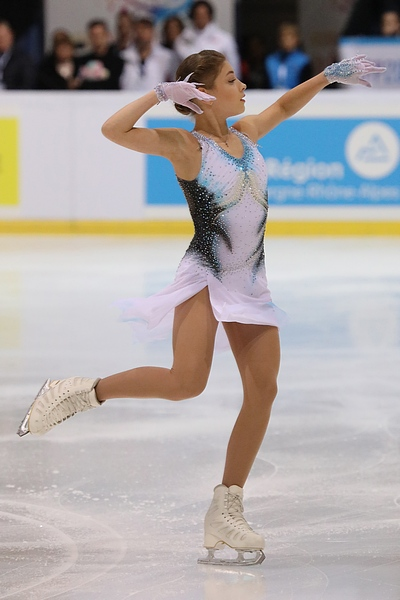
- Kostornaia during the short program at the 2019 Internationaux de France

Personal information
- Native name: Алёна Сергеевна Косторная (Russian)
- Full name: Alena Sergeevna Kostornaia
- Other names: Alyona Kostornaya
- Born: 24 August 2003 (age 23) Moscow, Russia
- Height: 1.58 m (5 ft 2 in)

Figure skating career
- Country: Russia
- Discipline: Pair skating (since 2023); Women's singles (until 2022)
- Partner: Georgy Kunitsa
- Coach: Evgeni Plushenko
- Skating club: CSKA
- Began skating: 2007
Medal record
Representing Russia
Figure skating: Ladies' singles
European Championships
Gold medal – first place	2020 Graz	Ladies' singles
Grand Prix Final
Gold medal – first place	2019–20 Torino	Ladies' singles
Russian Championships
Silver medal – second place	2020 Krasnoyarsk	Women's singles
Bronze medal – third place	2018 Saint Petersburg	Women's singles
Bronze medal – third place	2019 Saransk	Women's singles
World Junior Championships
Silver medal – second place	2018 Sofia	Ladies' singles
Junior Grand Prix Final
Gold medal – first place	2018–19 Vancouver	Ladies' singles
Silver medal – second place	2017–18 Nagoya	Ladies' singles

Aliona Sergeevna Kostornaia (Russian: Алёна Сергеевна Косторная; born 24 August 2003) is a Russian figure skater. As a singles skater, she is the 2020 European champion, the 2019–20 Grand Prix Final champion, a six-time Grand Prix medalist (including gold at the 2019 Internationaux de France and the 2019 NHK Trophy), and the 2019 CS Finlandia Trophy champion. Competing domestically, she is a three-time Russian senior national medalist (silver 2020, bronze 2018 and 2019). She previously held the world record for the highest senior short program score in women's skating.

At the junior level, Kostornaia is the 2018 Junior World silver medalist, the 2018–19 Junior Grand Prix Final champion, the 2017–18 Junior Grand Prix Final silver medalist, and a two-time Russian junior national silver medalist (2018, 2019). She currently holds the world record for the highest junior short program score in women's skating.

Kostornaia is the 10th woman in history to have landed the triple Axel jump in a senior international competition. Kostornaia is the third woman after teammate Elizaveta Tuktamysheva and Rika Kihira of Japan to attempt and land the maximum number of triple jumps allowed in one senior international competition: four in the short program and eight in the free skate (see Zayak rule). She first accomplished this at the 2019 Internationaux de France, and later landed all 12 triples cleanly at the 2019–20 Grand Prix Final.

== Personal life ==
Kostornaia was born on 24 August 2003 in Moscow to parents Sergei and Tatiana. She has a younger brother, Stepan. Although she registers her name as "Alena" with the ISU, Kostornaia uses the romanization of "Aliona" on her official Instagram account. In a May 2020 Q&A with former teammate Anna Shcherbakova, Kostornaia stated that she wants to become a neurosurgeon once she retires from figure skating.

In her free time, Kostornaia enjoys horseback riding and as such often received horse and unicorn stuffed toys from fans. She also has several pets, including a rabbit gifted to her by her fans, a cat, and a Maltipoo named Audrey. Kostornaia is a supporter of FC Lokomotiv Moscow.

As of September 2021, Kostornaia is a student studying psychology at the Russian State University of Physical Education, Sport, Youth and Tourism.

Kostornaia married her skating partner, Georgy Kunitsa, on 11 August 2023, following a brief engagement. On 25 April 2025, Kostornaia announced via an Instagram video that she was pregnant. On 3 October 2025, Kostornaia and Kunitsa announced the birth of their son Dmitry Kunitsa via Instagram. He was born on 28 September 2025.

== Career ==
=== Single skating ===
==== Early years ====
Kostornaia began learning to skate in 2007. Her parents initially put her in skating as a way to channel her energy. From 2012 to 2017, she was coached by Elena Zhgun in Moscow.

Kostornaia sustained an injury in 2016. She finished 16th at the 2017 Russian Junior Championships. Eteri Tutberidze and Sergei Dudakov became her coaches in 2017.

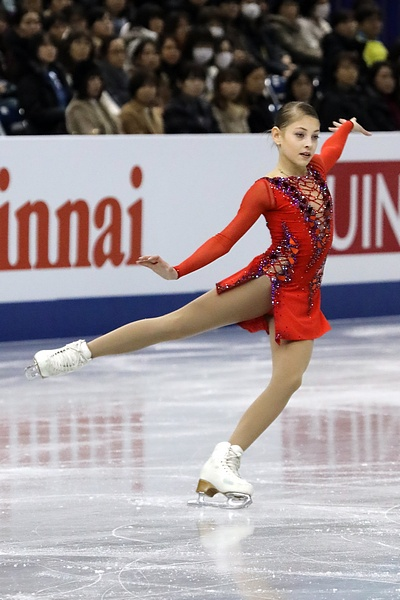
Kostornaia at the 2017-2018 Junior Grand Prix Final

==== 2017–2018 season: Junior international debut ====
Kostornaia's international debut was in early October 2017, at a 2017–18 ISU Junior Grand Prix (JGP) competition in Gdańsk, Poland; ranked first in the short program and second in the free skate, she won the gold medal by a margin of 1.36 points over the silver medalist, her training partner Daria Panenkova. She won silver behind Sofia Samodurova at JGP Italy by a margin of 0.04 points. Her placements qualified her for the 2017–18 Junior Grand Prix of Figure Skating Final, where she won silver, placing second in the short program and first in the free skate. At the senior level, Kostornaia won bronze at the 2018 Russian Figure Skating Championships. She later won silver at the 2018 Russian Junior Championships behind teammate Alexandra Trusova by a margin of 0.58 points.

In March 2018, Kostornaia competed at the 2018 World Junior Championships. She placed second in the short program and the free skate, winning the silver medal behind Trusova.

==== 2018–2019 season: Junior Grand Prix Final champion ====
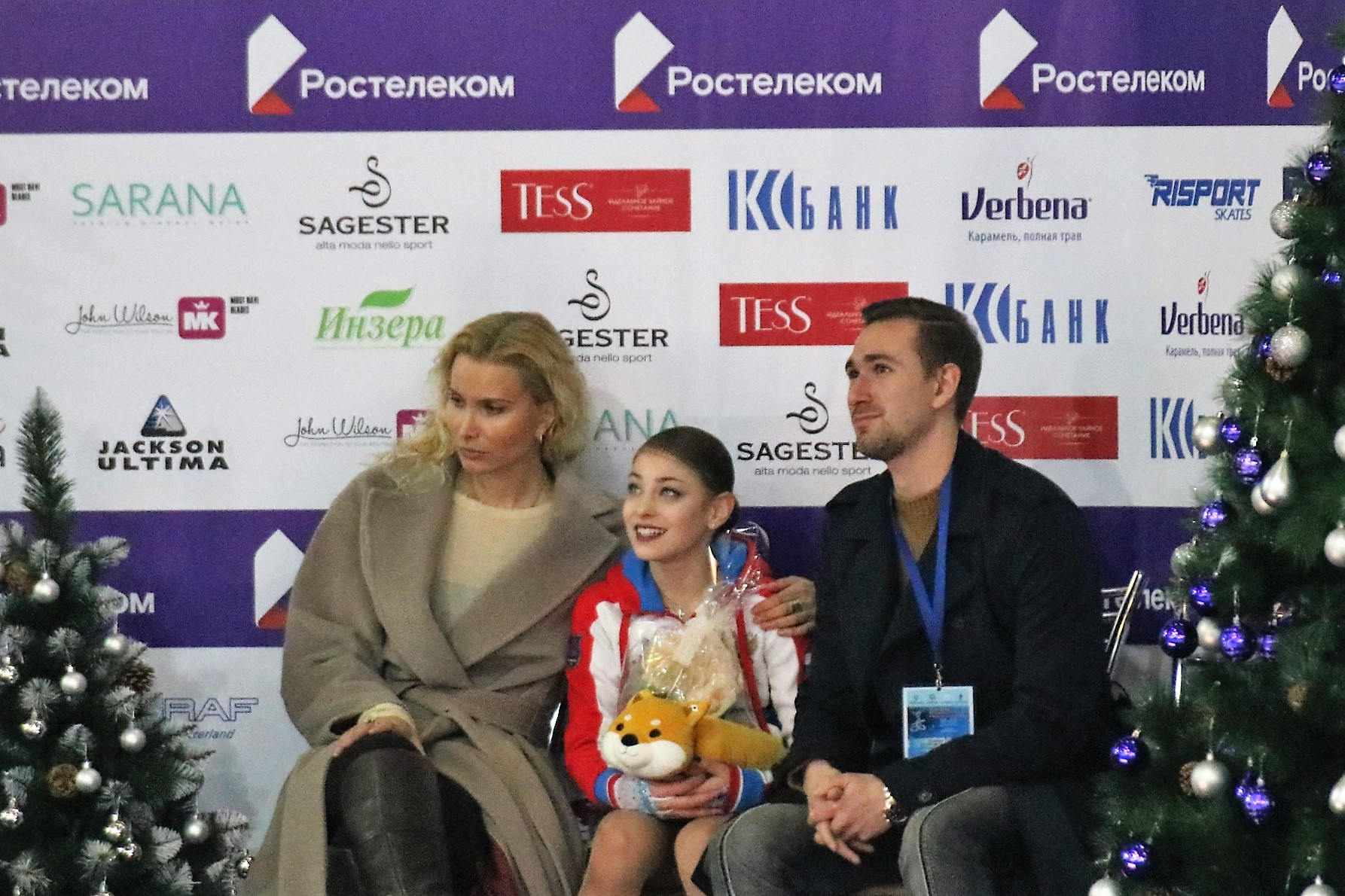
Kostornaia with Eteri Tutberidze (left) and Daniil Gleikhengauz (right) at the 2019 Russian Championships

Kostornaia learned to perform a triple Axel in the preceding year, and originally planned to introduce it in competition. However, she lost the jump following growth during the offseason. Kostornaia started her season by competing in the 2018 JGP series. She won the gold medal at her first JGP event of the season in Linz, Austria. She was ranked first in both the short program and the free skate and won the gold medal by a margin of more than 11 points over the silver medalist, her teammate Alena Kanysheva.

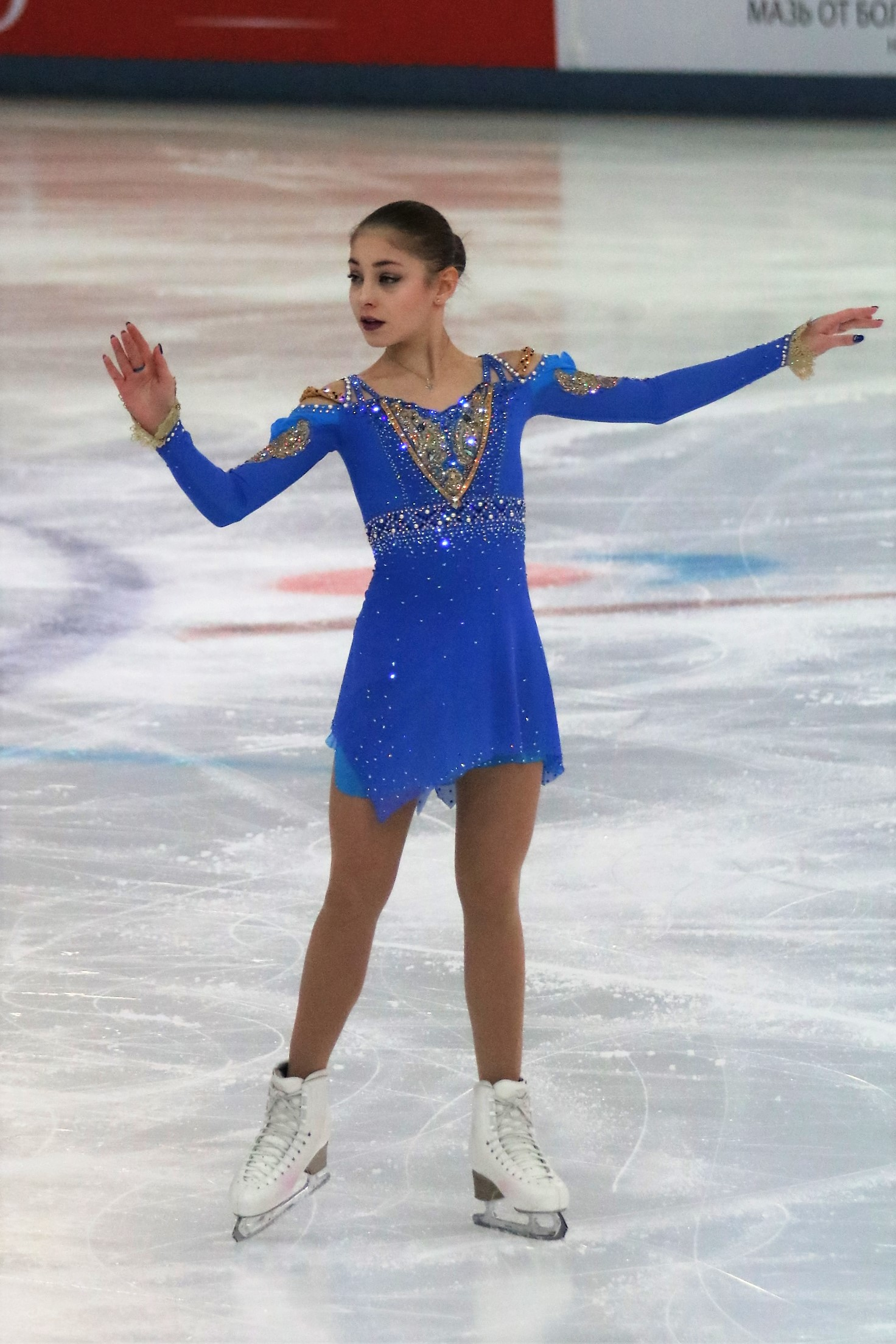
Kostornaia at the 2019 Russian Figure Skating Championships

She skated her second JGP event of the season at JGP Ostrava, where she again placed first in both the short program and the free skate. She won the gold medal by a margin of about two points over the silver medalist, Kim Ye-lim. With two JGP victories, she qualified for the 2018–19 Junior Grand Prix Final, where she won the gold medal after placing first in both the short program and the free skate. She outscored her teammate and training partner Trusova by about 2.5 points. At this event, Kostornaia scored her personal best score of 217.98 points, and also set a new junior record for the short program (76.32 points).

At the 2019 Russian Championships, Kostornaia placed third in the short program due to a fall during her step sequence, which she attributed to being "too relaxed" as she was nearing the end of the program and had already completed all of her jumping passes. She then placed third in the free skate as well, winning her second consecutive national bronze medal.

Kostornaia participated in the 2019 Russian Junior Championships, winning the short program and placing second in the free skate. She placed second overall, winning her second consecutive junior national silver medal. After the event, she was named to the Russian team for the 2019 World Junior Championships along with training mates Trusova and Anna Shcherbakova. However, on 4 March, the first day of the event, Kostornaia withdrew from the competition due to a medical condition, subsequently revealed by choreographer Daniil Gleikhengauz to be leg inflammation that required four weeks away from training. She was replaced by Ksenia Sinitsyna.

==== 2019–2020 season: Undefeated senior international debut and European title ====
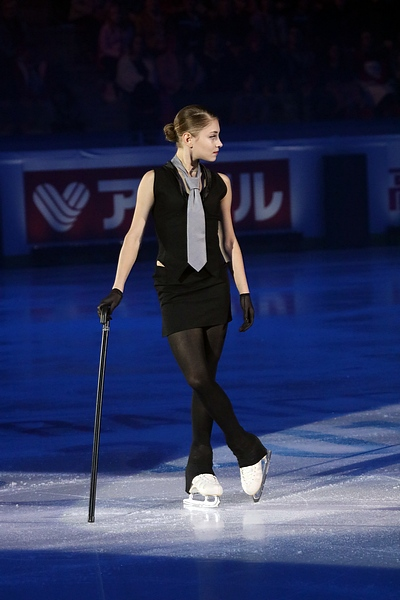
Kostornaia 2019 Internationaux de France gala

For her programs, Kostornaia retained her short program from the previous season and revised a Twilight–themed exhibition program from the previous year to serve as her free skate, citing how much she enjoyed skating it. Shortly after debuting her programs at the Russian test skates, Kostornaia resumed training the triple Axel jump. Kostornaia debuted on the senior international level at the 2019 CS Finlandia Trophy, where she placed first in both the short program and free skate. She incorporated two triple Axels in her free skate, becoming the tenth woman in history to land the jump in an international competition, and earned a total combined score of 234.84, 22.31 points ahead of silver medalist Elizaveta Tuktamysheva.

Making her senior Grand Prix debut at the 2019 Internationaux de France, Kostornaia ranked first in the short program, incorporating a triple Axel into it for the first time. She then became the fourth woman ever, after Mao Asada, Rika Kihira and Elizaveta Tuktamysheva, to land two fully rotated triple Axels in a free skate, placing first in the segment with a personal best score of 159.45 points. She took the gold medal over training mate and reigning World and Olympic champion Alina Zagitova by a margin of 19.94 points. At the 2019 NHK Trophy, Kostornaia performed a clean skate with a successful triple Axel to place first in the short program, 5.15 points over Rika Kihira, who also landed a triple Axel, and set a new world record score of 85.04 for the ladies' short program at the senior level. In the free, she again placed first and won the event with a personal best total score of 240.00. Kostornaia became the top qualifier for the Grand Prix Final in Torino, with two gold medal finishes and 30 points overall.

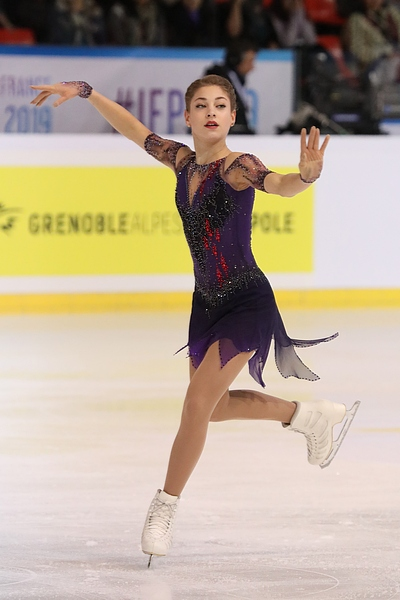
Kostornaia performing her free skate at the 2019 Internationaux de France

At the 2019–20 Grand Prix Final, she broke her own world record by scoring 85.45 points in the short program, placing first. In spite of having the only clean free skate amongst the ladies, Kostornaia ranked second in that segment, 0.51 point behind teammate Anna Shcherbakova. However, her lead from the short program was enough to not only win the title by almost seven points over Shcherbakova, but also to break the world record in the combined total score, previously held by Alexandra Trusova. She became the fifth figure skater in any discipline to win the Junior Grand Prix Final and Grand Prix Final in consecutive years. Kostornaia competed next at the 2020 Russian National championships, where she again won the short program, setting a ten-point lead over second-place Anna Shcherbakova. However, she placed second in the free skate, due to mistakes on her double Axel and triple flip-triple toe loop combination. She received the silver medal, two points behind Shcherbakova, and secured a spot on the European and World teams.

At the 2020 European Championships, Kostornaia was in the lead following a clean short program. She placed second in the free skate behind Shcherbakova, receiving a deduction for falling on her last jumping pass, a triple Lutz, but still scored enough to claim the European title by three points. Upon being interviewed after her victory, she expressed surprise at the results, as she had not expected to win in light of the mistake.

After the 2020 World Championships were cancelled over concern about the COVID-19 pandemic, Kostornaia officially ended her season undefeated at every international competition of her senior debut.

==== 2020–2021 season: Coaching changes and COVID-19 ====
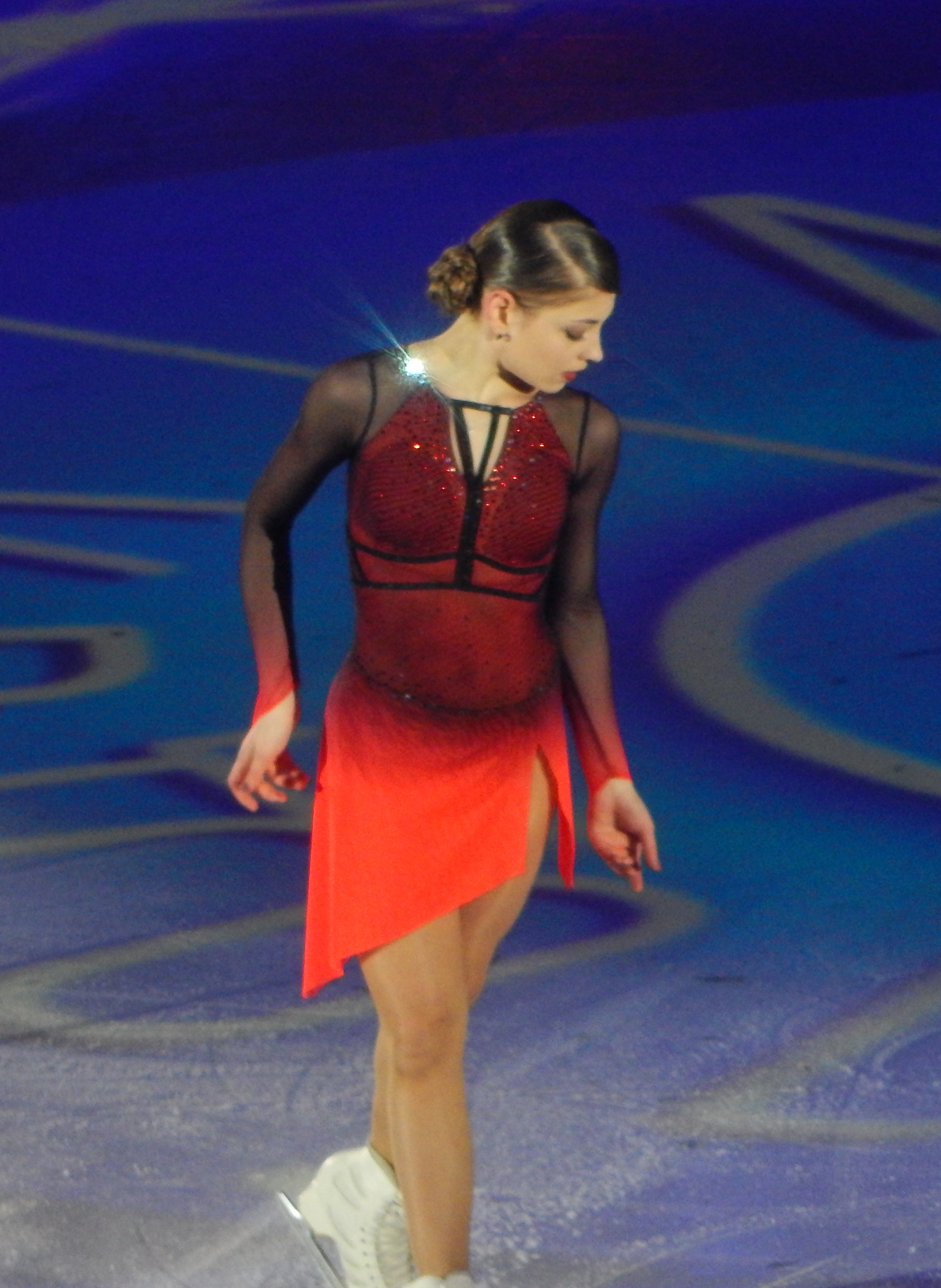
Kostornaia at the Moscow VTB Arena Ice Show (2020)

On 31 July 2020, it was announced by Russian media outlet R-Sport that Kostornaia had chosen to part ways with Tutberidze to train in the camp of coach Evgeni Plushenko. This news was first reported by Tutberidze herself via Instagram where she claimed that the split was due to Kostornaia's refusal to share the ice with other teammates. Kostornaia herself initially declined to comment on her departure. Although she left Tutberidze with two new programs set, including a new free program to three variations of Lovely by Billie Eilish and Khalid, Plushenko stated in an interview with TASS that he and his team would set two more new programs for Kostornaia for the season, potentially with international choreographers. While her new short program ended up being choreographed by her coach, Sergei Rozanov, her new free program was choreographed remotely by Canadian former ice dancer and choreographer Shae-Lynn Bourne due to COVID-19 travel restrictions.

At the 2020 Russian test skate event, Kostornaia only performed her short program as her free program was not finalized due to limited training time. Plushenko also stated that Kostornaia was recovering from an unspecified injury and had not yet returned to top form. Due to the injury and late coaching change, Kostornaia was assigned to the final two events in the 2020–21 Russian Cup series, a domestic competition series used to determine qualification to the Russian Figure Skating Championships. She was also assigned to compete at the 2020 Rostelecom Cup.

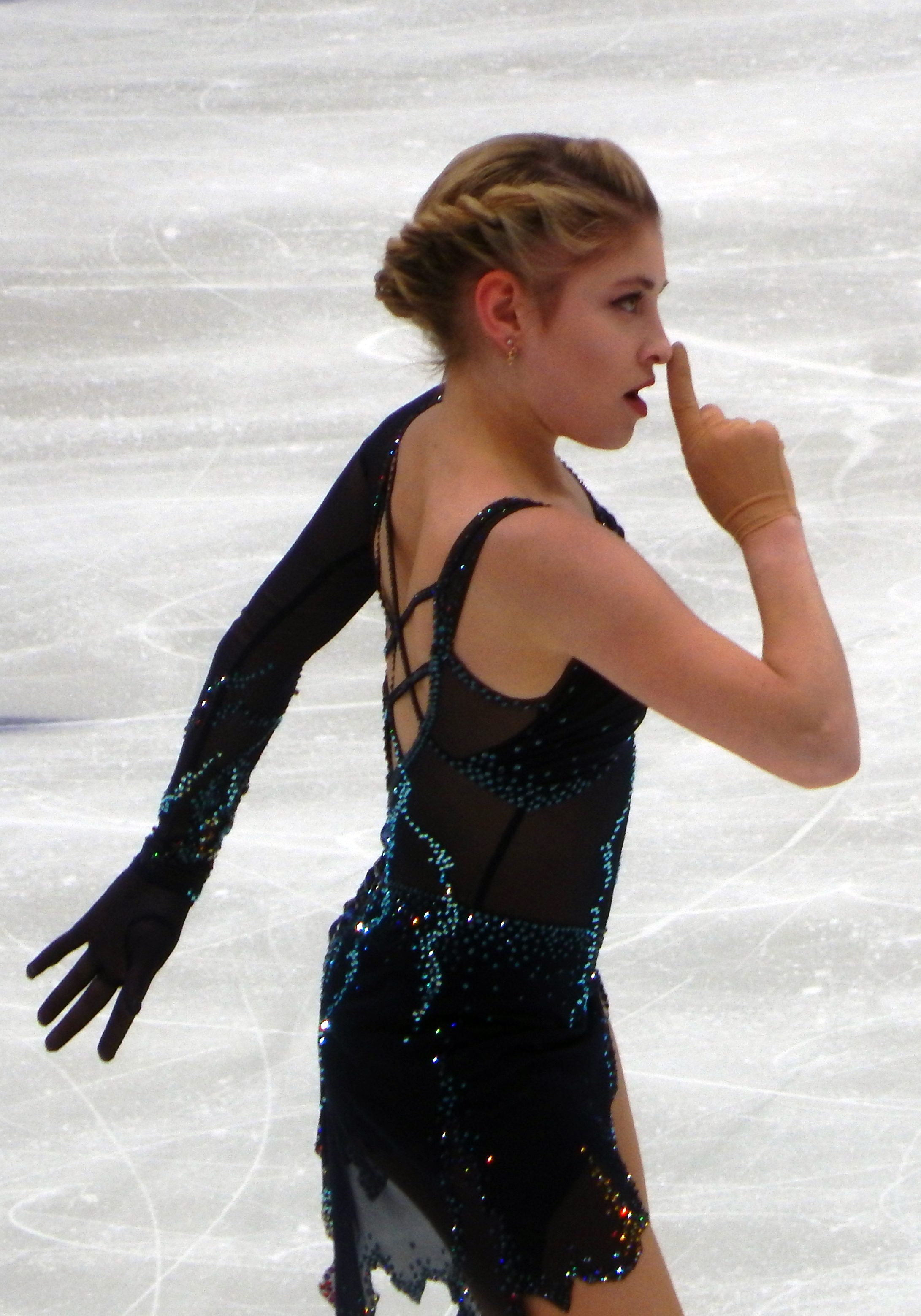
Kostornaia at the 2020 Rostelecom Cup

Kostornaia opened her competitive season at the fourth stage of the domestic Russian Cup series held in Kazan, Russia on 8 November. She won the short program by a small margin over Trusova with a score of 78.15, despite a step-out on her triple flip-triple toe loop combination and a loss of control on her Biellmann spin. In the free skate, she placed second behind Trusova and won the silver medal overall. At the 2020 Rostelecom Cup, Kostornaia cleanly skated her short program and placed first in that segment with a score of 78.84 points, four points ahead of Tuktamysheva, who performed a triple Axel but made an error executing her combination. She dropped to the silver medal position behind Tuktamysheva in the free skate, after under rotating three triple jumps and losing levels on several non-jump elements. She remarked afterward: "you need jumps like the triple Axel and quads to compete at the highest level, so it is in my plans and I'm working towards that."

On 4 December, it was announced that Kostornaia had withdrawn from the fifth stage of the Russian Cup after contracting COVID-19. She later withdrew from the 2021 Russian Championships on 22 December due to lack of training time caused by her recovery from the virus. On 19 January 2021, it was announced that she was selected to participate in the Channel One Russia Figure Skating Cup, a domestic team tournament featuring six skaters or teams in each discipline, competing against one another in teams of three. Kostornaia earned her place in the event because of the strength of her performance at the 2020 European Championships as she was unable to perform at the 2021 national championships, and was chosen to compete alongside fellow top contenders Shcherbakova, Trusova, Tuktamysheva, Daria Usacheva, and Valieva. She later withdrew from the event on 3 February due to incomplete recovery from COVID-19.

Kostornaia announced on Instagram on 28 January that she had developed a new free program, again choreographed by Bourne. Vice President of the ISU Alexander Lakernik visited one of Kostornaia's training sessions to help polish the program. In addition to her new free skate to "My Way" and "Yellow Moon" by Luca D'Alberto, she also debuted a new short program to Vivaldi's The Four Seasons: Winter at the 2021 Russian Cup Final. The final was widely perceived as a contest between Kostornaia and Tuktamysheva for the third spot on the Russian ladies' team for the 2021 World Championships in Stockholm. She struggled in the short at the event, only executing a tight double toe loop after a messy landing on the triple flip in her intended triple flip-triple-toe loop combination, placing sixth in the segment. She maintained her standing in the free skate to finish sixth overall, two placements below Tuktamysheva. The final marked the end to Kostornaia's competitive season as Tuktamysheva was named to the World Championship team on 1 March.

On 3 March, it was reported by TASS that Kostornaia was in the process of negotiating a return to her former coach, Tutberidze, pending agreement from Tutberidze herself. When asked about the transfer, Kostornaia would neither confirm or deny the rumors. Sports.ru also reported on the situation with the additional detail that Tutberidze was hesitant to accept due to doubts that Kostornaia would be able to regain her previous form after struggling with a back injury and a stress fracture on her leg. On 6 March, it was announced that Tutberidze had accepted Kostornaia back into her group for a two-month probationary period, during which Kostornaia would have to adhere completely to the team's training regimen and regain her triple Axel in order to continue permanently.

Due to her struggles during the 2020–21 season, Kostornaia was excluded from Russian national team for the 2021–22 season and was instead named to the reserve team as first alternate. Main national team members and reserve team members receive the same amount of funding from the Russian Figure Skating Federation, with the primary difference between the two being the amount of funds allocated to the skater's club.

==== 2021–2022 season: Final season with Tutberidze ====
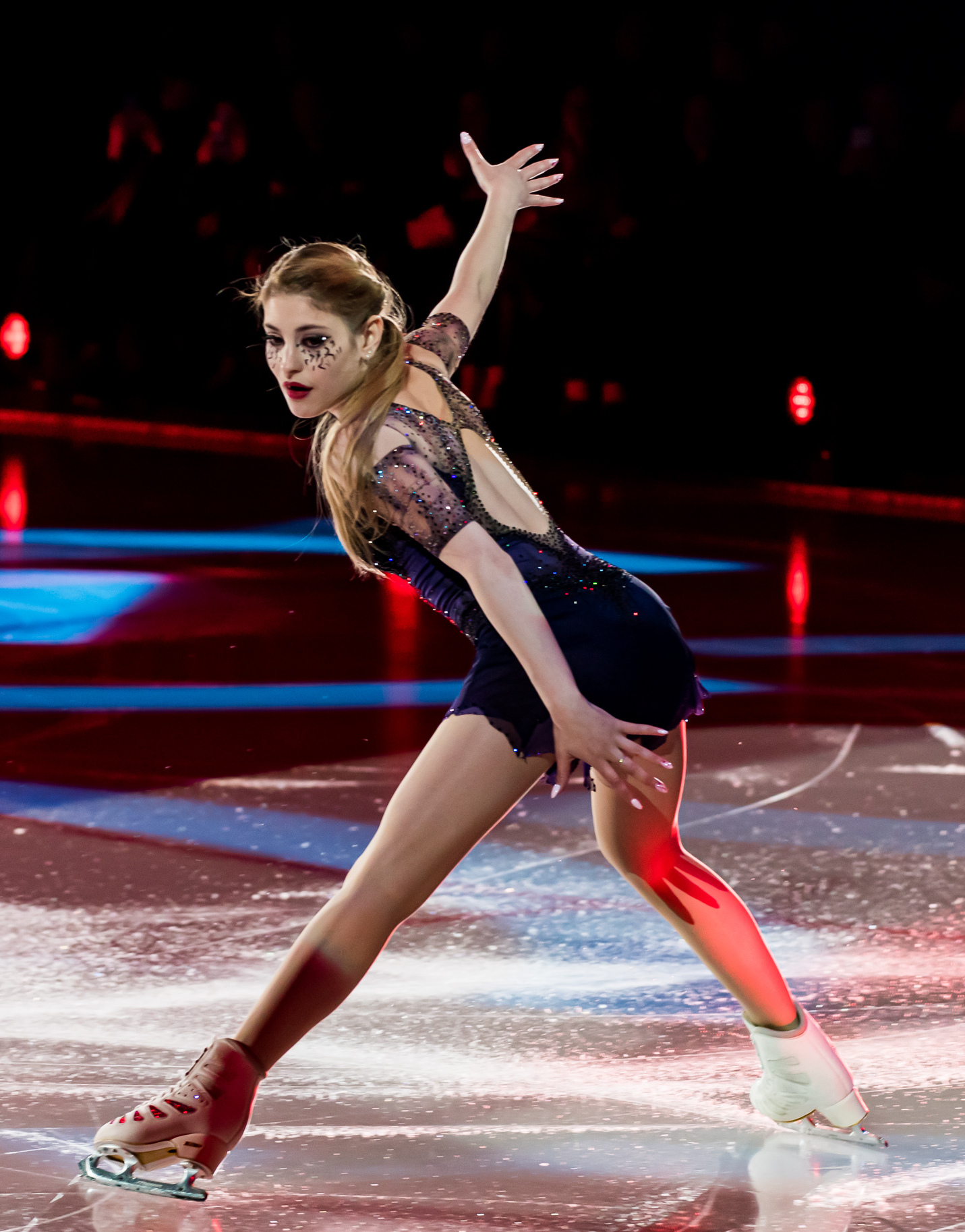
Kostornaia performing "Twilight" (2022)

Kostornaia debuted her programs for the Olympic season at the 2021 Russian test skate event where she attempted the triple Axel again for the first time since the 2019–20 season. She landed one of her two attempts cleanly. At her first international assignment of the season, the 2021 CS Finlandia Trophy, Kostornaia did not attempt the triple Axel in the short program, opting instead to skate cleanly under the advisement of her coaches, and placed second in the segment behind teammate Tuktamysheva. In the free program, Kostornaia struggled with her technical elements, placing fourth in the segment, but managed to remain on the podium, winning the bronze medal behind training mates Valieva and Tuktamysheva.

Due to travel restrictions related to the COVID-19 pandemic, there was concern that Kostornaia, along with several other members of the Russian delegation, would not receive her travel visa in time to compete at her first Grand Prix assignment of the season, the 2021 Skate Canada International. Fortunately, Kostornaia and her compatriots received their passports and visas on 25 October, just four days before the start of the competition. On 26 October, it was announced by Match TV that Kostornaia had chosen to change both of her programs in advance of Skate Canada, switching to a short program set to "New York, New York", and revisiting the free skate choreographer Daniil Gleikhengauz had originally set for her for the 2020–21 season to three variations of Billie Eilish and Khalid's "Lovely."

At Skate Canada, Kostornaia placed third in the short program. She attempted and landed her triple Axel, though it was called on the quarter, and trailed behind Valieva and Tuktamysheva. She was fourth in the free skate, but remained in third place overall. She said afterward that she had "made some errors, but was pleased with my results." At her second event, the 2021 Internationaux de France, Kostornaia skated a clean short program without a triple Axel. She attempted and fell on it in the free skate, but landed her other jumps, taking the silver medal. She skated the free skate with dramatic makeup she cited as a tribute to Billie Eilish, "who is also not afraid to look different than others, and I really relate to that". Due to her placements at her two Grand Prix assignments, Kostornaia qualified to the final women's spot in the 2021–22 Grand Prix Final, but the event was canceled due to travel restrictions related to the Omicron variant.

On 13 December 2021, it was announced by Sports.ru that Kostornaia had been forced to withdraw from the 2022 Russian Championships due to a hand fracture that would keep her off the ice for nearly three weeks. She declined to comment on the injury, but her inability to compete was largely perceived by figures in Russian figure skating as the end to her bid to qualify to the Russian team for the 2022 Winter Olympics. Kostornaia later confirmed in a video on her YouTube channel that the injury was the result of a bad fall on a failed triple Axel attempt. She returned to training in February, where she suffered a new fracture in her left wrist while restoring her jumps.

In an Instagram post made on 14 December, Kostornaia stated that she planned to continue to compete for another Olympic quadrennial. On 2 March 2022, Russian media outlet Sports.ru reported that Kostornaia had been asked to leave the Tutberidze training group by her coaches and would begin training under Elena Buianova. She commenced training with Buianova on 8 March.

=== Pair skating ===
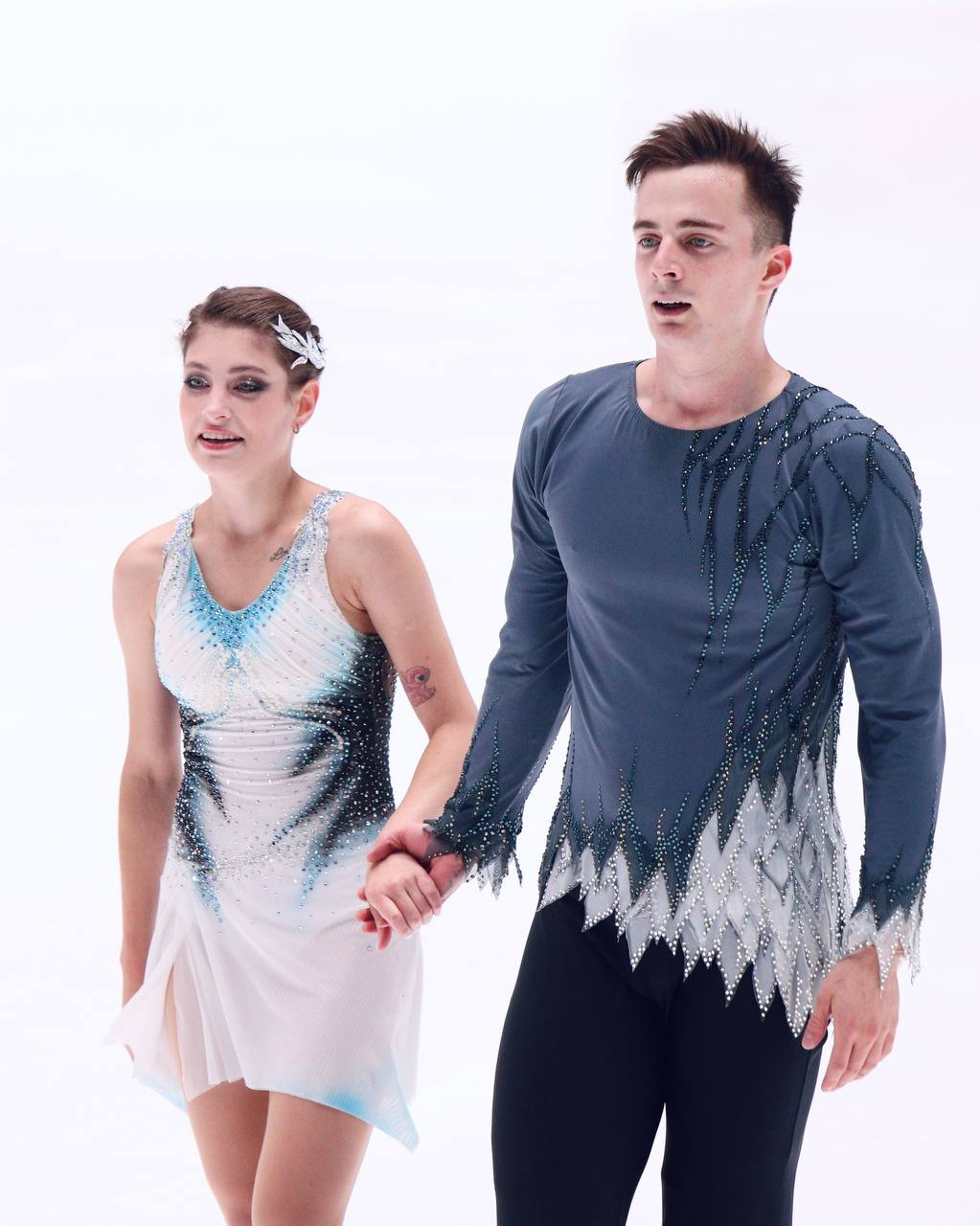
Kostornaia/Kunitsa at the Russian Test Skates (2024)

==== 2022–2023 season: Transition to pair skating ====
On 7 August 2022, Kostornaia's coach, Buianova, announced that Kostornaia would undergo hip surgery on 8 August to repair an existing injury. The surgery was later delayed, and ultimately took place in September. In January 2023, Buianova announced that she was no longer coaching Kostornaia, as the skater had opted to transition to pairs, teamed with Georgy Kunitsa and coached by Sergei Roslyakov.

Kostornaia/Kunitsa did not compete on the Russian domestic circuit during the spring of 2023, opting to spend that time strengthening their skills as a team.

==== 2023–2024 season: Debut of Kostornaia/Kunitsa ====
Kostornaia/Kunitsa made their domestic debut as a team at the 2023 Russian test skate event in September. At the 2024 Russian Championships the pair finished in 9th place.

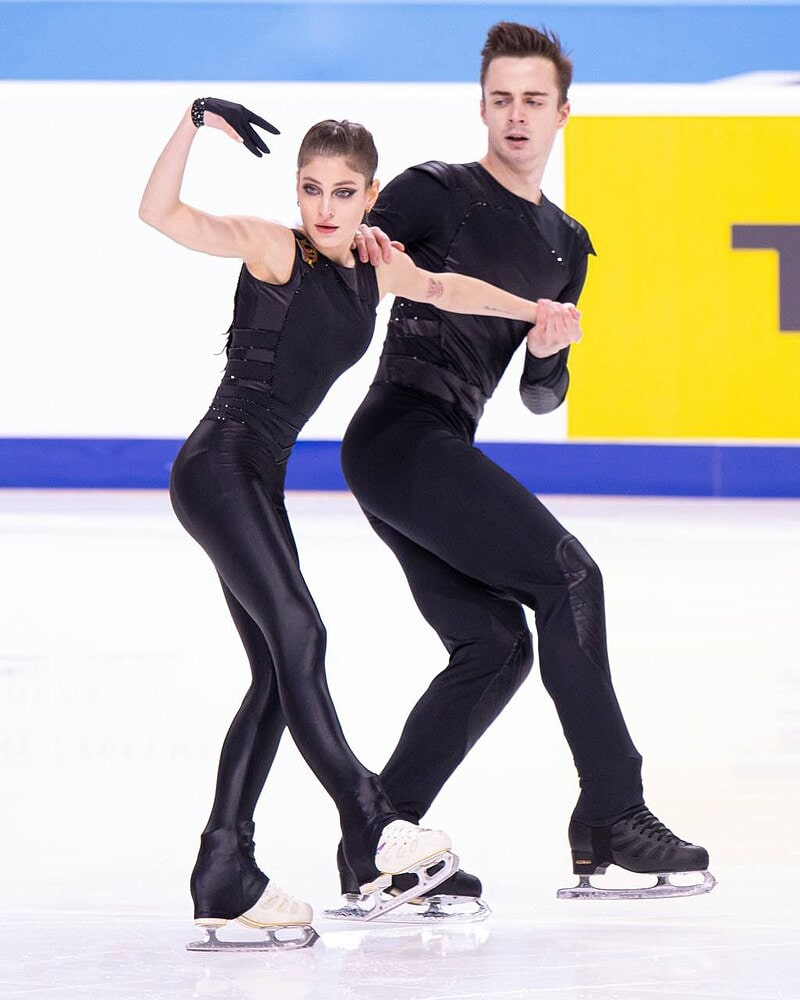
Kostornaia/Kunitsa at the 2024 Russian Figure Skating Championships

==== 2024–2025 season ====
Kostornaia/Kunitsa appeared at the 2024 Russian test skates, but subsequently withdrew from the rest of the season due to an unspecified illness contracted by Kostornaia.

==== 2025–2026 season: Return to Plushenko ====
Four months after giving birth to their son, Kostornaia and Kunitsa announced that they would be returning to training under the guidance of Plushenko at Angels of Plushenko Figure Skating Academy. They did not compete during the 2025–26 season.

==== 2026–2027 season ====
At the beginning of the new season, Kostornaia shared that she had recently undergone surgery and the pairs' training came to a hold. “Right now, our training is completely on hold. A few weeks ago, back in August, I had surgery. To be honest, we really didn’t want to do it. But the situation became critical – further training was impossible.”

== Skating technique ==
Kostornaia's skating technique is distinguished by her strong program components, particularly her skating skills and artistic interpretation of her programs, combined with her ability to execute difficult technical elements, such as her now trademark triple Axel. Unlike her training mates at Sambo-70, Kostornaia is often considered a product of the Elena Tchaikovskaia school of figure skating as her first coach, Elena Zhgun, was a student of Tchaikovskaia's and passed her knowledge of strong skating basics on to Kostornaia from a young age. She is often compared to her training mates Shcherbakova and Trusova as the three entered the international junior and senior competitive circuits together and for many seasons were considered one another's primary rivals by both fans and specialists. Of the three (sometimes referred to as the 3A as their names all begin with the letter A), Kostornaia is widely considered the most artistic, with Trusova being her technical counterpart and Shcherbakova falling somewhere in the middle.

In 2019, Olympic champion Tara Lipinski referred to Kostornaia as part of the future hope of the Russian women's figure skating, singling her out as "a figure skater who proves that you can achieve technical excellence in landing triple Axels and perhaps even quads in the near future. At the same time, she does not forget about basics such as balance which viewers of the sport admire as well as her presentation of fine emotional qualities in the execution of her programs."

Kostornaia has a history of increasing the difficulty of the technical elements in her programs to remain at the top of the ladies field. During the 2019–20 season, she began incorporating a triple Axel into her programs in order to compete with Shcherbakova and Trusova, who were both performing multiple quadruple jumps in their free programs. She has stated in the past that she hopes to eventually add a quad salchow to her technical arsenal.

== Public life ==
Kostornaia is a two-time Silver Doe prize recipient (2019, 2020) for Best Sportsman of the Year. Silver Doe awards are presented annually by the Federation of Sports Journalists of Russia in recognition of distinguished athletic achievement.

== World record scores ==
=== Senior ===
Chronological list of world record scores in the +5/-5 GOE System
Date	Score	Segment	Event
1 Sep 2018	132.42	Free skating	ISU JGP Cup of Austria 2018
22 Nov 2019	85.04	Short program	2019 NHK Trophy
6 Dec 2019	85.45	Short program	2019–20 Grand Prix Final
7 Dec 2019	247.59	Combined total	2019–20 Grand Prix Final

=== Junior ===
Chronological list of world record scores in the +5/-5 GOE System
Date	Score	Segment	Event
1 Sep 2018	132.42	Free skating	ISU JGP Cup of Austria 2018
6 Dec 2018	76.32	Short program	2018–19 Junior Grand Prix Final

== Programs ==
=== Pairs with Kunitsa ===
Competition and exhibition programs by season
Season	Short program	Free skate program	Exhibition program
2023–24	"Crazy in Love": Performed by Kadebostany (originally by Beyoncé); Choreo. by Betina Popova	The Hunger Games: 1. "Yellow Flicker Beat"; From The Hunger Games: Mockingjay – Part 1; Performed by Lorde; 2. Main Theme; Performed by DJ Blue; 3. "The Hanging Tree"; Composed by James Newton Howard, Jeremiah Fraites, and Wesley Schultz; Performed by Jennifer Lawrence; Choreo. by Betina Popova	The Four Seasons: Summer: Composed by Antonio Vivaldi, arranged by Max Richter
2023–24	Medley: 1. "The Departure (Lullaby)"; From The Leftovers; Composed by Max Richter; 2. "Wait For Me"; Composed by Luca D'Alberto; Choreo. by Betina Popova	The Hunger Games	Love Theme: From Romeo and Juliet; Composed by Nino Rota, arranged by Henry Mancini
2024–25	Medley: 1. "The Departure (Lullaby)"; From The Leftovers; Composed by Max Richter; 2. "Wait For Me"; Composed by Luca D'Alberto; Choreo. by Betina Popova	The Master and Margarita: From The Master and Margarita; Composed by Igor Kornelyuk; Tracks used: 1. "Satan's Ball"; 2. "Woland"	—N/a

=== Women's singles ===
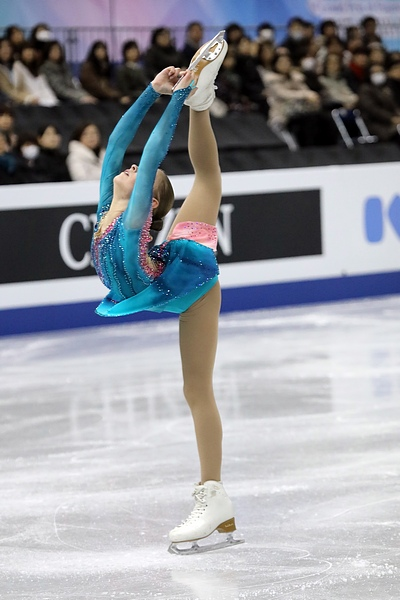
Kostornaia performing a Biellmann spin at the 2017–18 Junior Grand Prix Final

Competition and exhibition programs by season
Season	Short program	Free skate program	Exhibition program
2014–15	"Rhapsody in Rock": Composed by Robert Wells	"Maktub": Composed by Marcus Viana	—N/a
2015–16	"Maktub"	Carmen: Composed by Georges Bizet; Performed by Moscow Virtuosi Chamber; Choreo. by Semyon Kaufman	—N/a
2016–17	Carmen	"Les Valses de Vienne": Performed by François Feldman; Choreo. by Semyon Kaufman	—N/a
2017–18	Dos cadencias sobre "Adiós Nonino": Composed by Astor Piazzolla; Performed by Pablo Ziegler; Choreo. by Eteri Tutberidze	"Stella's Theme": Performed by William Joseph; Choreo. by Daniil Gleikhengauz	Dos cadencias sobre "Adiós Nonino"
2017–18	Dos cadencias sobre "Adiós Nonino": Composed by Astor Piazzolla; Performed by Pablo Ziegler; Choreo. by Eteri Tutberidze	"Stella's Theme": Performed by William Joseph; Choreo. by Daniil Gleikhengauz	Carmen
2018–19	Max Richter Medley: 1. "The Departure (Lullaby)"; From The Leftovers; 2. "November"; Composed by Max Richter; Choreo. by Daniil Gleikhengauz	Romeo and Juliet: 1. "Kissing You"; From Romeo + Juliet; Performed by Des'ree, written with Timothy Atack, arranged by Craig Armstrong; 2. "Forbidden Love"; From Romeo & Juliet; Composed by Abel Korzeniowski; 3. Love theme from "Romeo and Juliet"; From Romeo and Juliet; Composed by Nino Rota, arranged by Henry Mancini; Choreo. by Daniil Gleikhengauz	Twilight Medley: 1. "Eyes On Fire"; Performed by Blue Foundation; 2. "Supermassive Black Hole"; Performed by Muse
2018–19	Max Richter Medley: 1. "The Departure (Lullaby)"; From The Leftovers; 2. "November"; Composed by Max Richter; Choreo. by Daniil Gleikhengauz	Romeo and Juliet: 1. "Kissing You"; From Romeo + Juliet; Performed by Des'ree, written with Timothy Atack, arranged by Craig Armstrong; 2. "Forbidden Love"; From Romeo & Juliet; Composed by Abel Korzeniowski; 3. Love theme from "Romeo and Juliet"; From Romeo and Juliet; Composed by Nino Rota, arranged by Henry Mancini; Choreo. by Daniil Gleikhengauz	Dos cadencias sobre "Adiós Nonino"
2019–20	"The Departure (Lullaby)" & "November": Composed by Max Richter; Choreo. by Daniil Gleikhengauz	Twilight: 1. "New Moon (The Meadow)"; From The Twilight Saga: New Moon; Composed by Alexandre Desplat; 2. "Eyes On Fire"; From Twilight; Performed by Blue Foundation; 3. "Supermassive Black Hole"; From Twilight; Performed by Muse; Choreo. by Daniil Gleikhengauz	"Never Tear Us Apart"
2019–20	"The Departure (Lullaby)" & "November": Composed by Max Richter; Choreo. by Daniil Gleikhengauz	Twilight: 1. "New Moon (The Meadow)"; From The Twilight Saga: New Moon; Composed by Alexandre Desplat; 2. "Eyes On Fire"; From Twilight; Performed by Blue Foundation; 3. "Supermassive Black Hole"; From Twilight; Performed by Muse; Choreo. by Daniil Gleikhengauz	Twilight Medley: 1. "Eyes On Fire"; Performed by Blue Foundation; 2. "Supermassive Black Hole"; Performed by Muse
2020–21	Billie Eilish Medley: Performed by Billie Eilish; Choreo. by Sergei Rozanov, Elena Ilinykh; Tracks used: 1. " No Time to Die" (From: No Time to Die); 2. "You Should See Me in a Crown"	Abel Korzeniowski Medley: 1. "Wayward Sisters"; From Nocturnal Animals; 2. "Dance For Me Wallis"; From W.E.; 3. "The Cheek of Night"; From Romeo & Juliet; 4. "Abdication"; From W.E.; Performed by Abel Korzeniowski; Choreo. by Shae-Lynn Bourne	Adele Medley: Performed by Adele; Choreo. by Sergei Rozanov; Tracks used: 1. "Someone like You"; 2. "Rolling in the Deep"
2020–21	The Four Seasons: Winter: Composed by Antonio Vivaldi, arranged by Michel Schwalbé	Luca D'Alberto Medley: Performed by Luca D'Alberto; Choreo. by Shae-Lynn Bourne; Tracks used: 1. "My Way"; 2. "Yellow moon"	"Lovely" Medley: 1. "Lovely"; Performed by Billie Eilish and Khalid; 2. "Lovely (violin cover)"; Performed by ItsAMoney; 3. "Lovely (remix)"; Performed by galpe; Choreo. by Daniil Gleikhengauz
2021–22	"Am I The One": Performed by Beth Hart; Choreo. by Daniil Gleikhengauz	The Four Seasons: 1. The Four Seasons: Summer; Composed by Antonio Vivaldi; Performed by Anne-Sophie Mutter; 2. The Four Seasons: Winter; Composed by Antonio Vivaldi, arranged by Michel Schwalbé; Choreo. by Daniil Gleikhengauz	Twilight Medley: 1. "Eyes On Fire"; Performed by Blue Foundation; 2. "Supermassive Black Hole"; Performed by Muse
2021–22	"New York, New York": 1. "New York, New York"; From Shame; Performed by Carey Mulligan and Liz Caplan; 2. "New York, New York"; From New York, New York; Performed by Liza Minnelli; Choreo. by Daniil Gleikhengauz	"Lovely" Medley: 1. "Lovely"; Performed by Billie Eilish and Khalid; 2. "Lovely (violin cover)"; Performed by ItsAMoney; 3. "Lovely (remix)"; Performed by galpe; Choreo. by Daniil Gleikhengauz	Harley Quinn Medley: 1. "You Don't Own Me"; From Suicide Squad; Performed by Saygrace, feat. G-Eazy; 2. "Boss Bitch"; From Birds of Prey; Performed by Doja Cat
2021–22	"New York, New York": 1. "New York, New York"; From Shame; Performed by Carey Mulligan and Liz Caplan; 2. "New York, New York"; From New York, New York; Performed by Liza Minnelli; Choreo. by Daniil Gleikhengauz	"Lovely" Medley: 1. "Lovely"; Performed by Billie Eilish and Khalid; 2. "Lovely (violin cover)"; Performed by ItsAMoney; 3. "Lovely (remix)"; Performed by galpe; Choreo. by Daniil Gleikhengauz	Там нет меня ("I am not there"): Performed by Sevara Nazarkhan; Choreo. by Elena Radionova

== Competitive highlights ==
- GP – Event of the ISU Grand Prix Series
- JGP – Event of the ISU Junior Grand Prix Series
- CS – Event of the ISU Challenger Series
- C – Event was cancelled
- WD – Withdrew from competition

=== Women's singles ===
Competition placements at senior level
Season	2017-18	2018-19	2019-20	2020-21	2021-22
World Championships			C		
European Championships			1st		
Grand Prix Final			1st		C
GP France			1st		2nd
GP NHK Trophy			1st		
GP Rostelecom				2nd	
GP Skate Canada					3rd
CS Finlandia Trophy			1st		3rd
Russian Championships	3rd	3rd	2nd	WD	WD
Russian Cup Final	1st			6th	

Competition placements at junior level
Season	2016-17	2017-18	2018-19
Russian Junior Championships	16th	2nd	2nd
World Junior Championships		2nd	WD
Junior Grand Prix Final		2nd	1st
JGP Austria			1st
JGP Czech Republic			1st
JGP Italy		2nd	
JGP Poland		1st	

== Detailed results ==
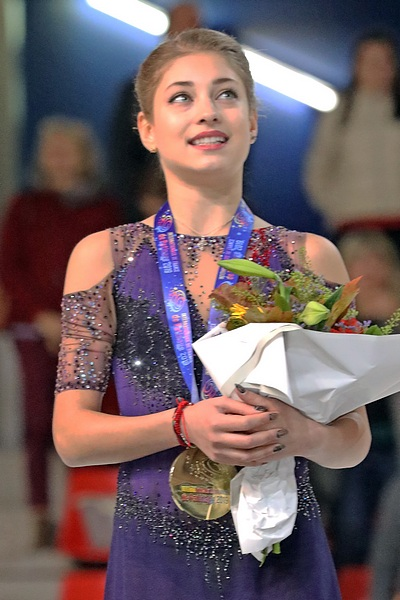
Kostornaia at the 2019 Internationaux de France

=== Pairs with Kunitsa ===
Results in the 2023–24 season
Date	Event	SP		FS		Total	
Date	Event	P	Score	P	Score	P	Score
20–24 Dec 2023	(Russia) 2024 Russian Championships	9	63.74	5	136.41	9	200.15

=== Women's singles ===
- TSS – Total segment score highlighted in **bold**
- TES – Technical element score
- PCS – Program component score

ISU personal best scores in the +5/-5 GOE System
Segment	Type	Score	Event
Total	**TSS**	**247.59**	2019–20 Grand Prix Final
Short program	**TSS**	**85.45**	2019–20 Grand Prix Final
Short program	TES	49.48	2019–20 Grand Prix Final
Short program	PCS	36.02	2020 European Championships
Free skating	**TSS**	**162.14**	2019–20 Grand Prix Final
Free skating	TES	88.87	2019–20 Grand Prix Final
Free skating	PCS	73.27	2019–20 Grand Prix Final

=== Senior level ===
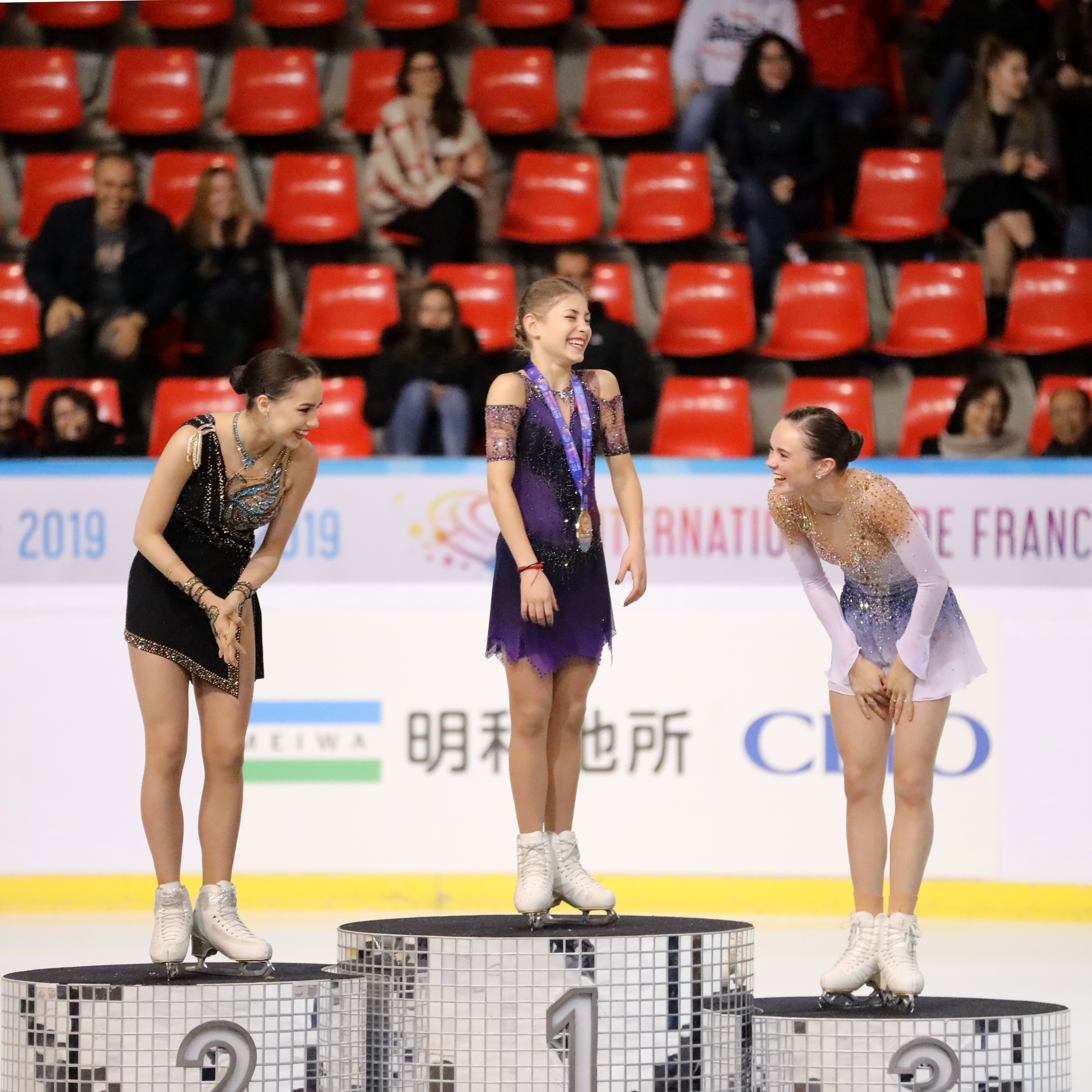
Kostornaia alongside Alina Zagitova and Mariah Bell at the 2019 Internationaux de France

- Small medals for the short program and free skating are only awarded at ISU Championships.

Results in the 2017–2018 season
Date	Event	SP		FS		Total	
Date	Event	P	Score	P	Score	P	Score
21–24 Dec 2017	(Russia) 2018 Russian Championships	4	73.59	4	142.98	3	216.57
19–23 Feb 2018	(Russia) 2018 Russian Cup Final	1	73.99	1	142.71	1	216.70

Results in the 2018–2019 season
Date	Event	SP		FS		Total	
Date	Event	P	Score	P	Score	P	Score
19–23 Dec 2018	(Russia) 2019 Russian Championships	3	74.40	3	152.54	3	226.54

Results in the 2019–20 season
Date	Event	SP		FS		Total	
Date	Event	P	Score	P	Score	P	Score
11–13 Oct 2019	(Finland) 2019 CS Finlandia Trophy	1	77.25	1	157.59	1	234.84
1–3 Nov 2019	2019 Internationaux de France	1	76.55	1	159.45	1	236.00
22–24 Nov 2019	(Japan) 2019 NHK Trophy	1	85.04	1	154.96	1	240.00
5–8 Dec 2019	(Italy) 2019–20 Grand Prix Final	1	85.45	2	162.14	1	247.59
26–29 Dec 2019	(Russia) 2020 Russian Championships	1	89.86	2	169.97	2	259.83
20–26 Jan 2020	(Austria) 2020 European Championships	1	84.92	2	155.89	1	240.81

Results in the 2020–21 season
Date	Event	SP		FS		Total	
Date	Event	P	Score	P	Score	P	Score
20–22 Nov 2020	(Russia) 2020 Rostelecom Cup	1	78.84	2	141.94	2	220.78
26 Feb – 2 Mar 2021	(Russia) 2021 Russian Cup Final	6	70.14	6	140.06	6	210.20

Results in the 2021–22 season
Date	Event	SP		FS		Total	
Date	Event	P	Score	P	Score	P	Score
7–10 Oct 2021	(Finland) 2021 CS Finlandia Trophy	2	78.61	4	140.22	3	218.83
29–31 Oct 2021	2021 Skate Canada International	3	75.58	4	138.96	3	214.54
19–21 Nov 2021	2021 Internationaux de France	2	76.44	2	145.81	2	221.85

=== Junior level ===
- Small medals for the short program and free skating are only awarded at ISU Championships.

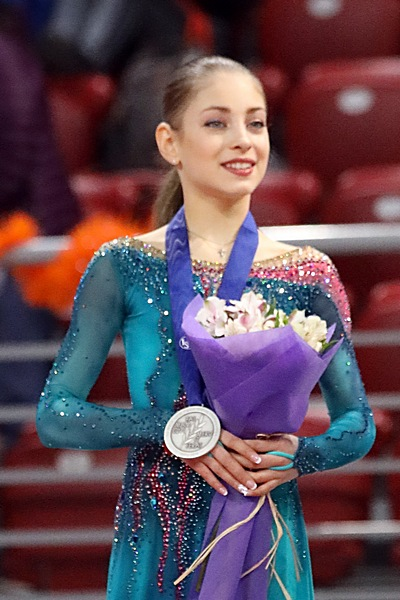
Kostornaia at the 2018 World Junior Championships

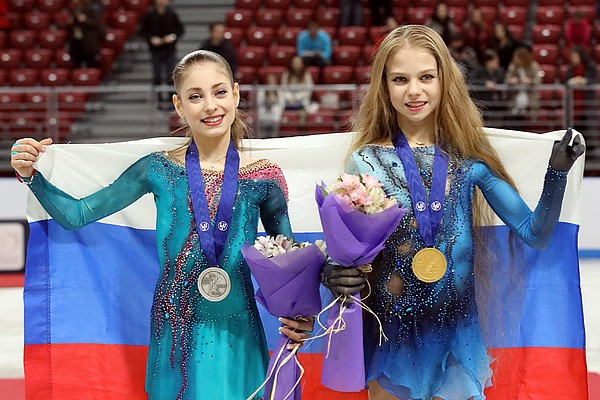
Kostornaia with Alexandra Trusova at the 2018 World Junior Championships

Results in the 2016–17 season
Date	Event	SP		FS		Total	
Date	Event	P	Score	P	Score	P	Score
1–5 Feb 2017	(Russia) 2017 Russian Junior Championships	12	57.77	16	103.48	16	161.25

Results in the 2017–2018 season
Date	Event	SP		FS		Total	
Date	Event	P	Score	P	Score	P	Score
4–7 Oct 2017	2017 JGP Poland	1	69.16	2	128.75	1	197.91
11–14 Oct 2017	2017 JGP Italy	1	67.72	2	124.43	2	192.15
7–10 Dec 2017	(Japan) 2017–18 JGP Final	2	71.65	1	132.93	2	204.58
23–26 Jan 2018	(Russia) 2018 Russian Junior Championships	3	69.88	1	141.63	2	211.51
5–11 Mar 2018	(Bulgaria) 2018 World Junior Championships	2	71.63	2	135.76	2	207.39

Results in the 2018–2019 season
Date	Event	SP		FS		Total	
Date	Event	P	Score	P	Score	P	Score
29 Aug – 1 Sep 2018	2018 JGP Austria	1	71.08	1	132.42	1	203.50
26–29 Sep 2018	2018 JGP Czech Republic	1	70.24	1	128.14	1	198.38
6–9 Dec 2018	(Canada) 2018–19 JGP Final	1	76.32	1	141.66	1	217.98
1–4 Feb 2019	(Russia) 2019 Russian Junior Championships	1	79.97	2	150.82	2	230.79
