= Hamskifte =

Studio album by Kirstine Stubbe Teglbjærg
- Released: April 22, 2013
- Genres: Post-rock, alternative rock, electronic
- Length: 54:46
- Labels: A:larm, Universal Music
- Producer: Kirstine Stubbe Teglbjærg

Hamskifte (Danish for Moulting) is former Blue Foundation singer Kirstine Stubbe Teglbjærg's first solo album.

The album is a mix of electronic and acoustic music. The texts are written and sung in Danish as Kirstine wanted to sing in the language of her mother.

The album has been released for vinyl to present the correct sound, but is also available on CD.

Some former members of Blue Foundation appears on the album such as drummer Nikolaj Bundvig which has played on two tracks. Both bassists Sune Martin and Anders Wallin are also playing on the album. Wallin is the main bassist of the record. He also added drums. Her brother, David Stubbe Teglbjærg also appears on Tæppet Er Faldet.

== Track listing ==
1. "Drømmenes Lyd" - 4:13
2. "Levende Igen" - 3:40
3. "Broerne Brænder" - 4:59
4. "Lysvæld Og Sol" - 5:05
5. "Under Isen" - 4:10
6. "Hamskifte" - 3:17
7. "Tungt Er Mit Hår" - 4:28
8. "Tæppet Er Faldet" - 3:25
9. "Det Larmer Ikke Mere" - 2:20

== Personnel ==
=== Musicians ===
- Kirstine Stubbe Teglbjærg - Vocals, Guitar, Würlitzer, Piano, Synthesizer, Organ Pipes, Daf Drum, Glass, Bottles, Glockenspiel, Bells, Field Recordings
- Dodebum - Synthesizer (tracks: 1 to 8), programmation (track: 1), glockenspiel (track: 6)
- Anders Wallin - bass, bass recording (tracks: 2, 4, 6, 7, 8), drums recording (tracks: 3, 6, 8)
- Sune Martin - additional bass, bass recording (track: 8)
- Rune Kielsgaard - drums (tracks: 2, 6, 7, 8)
- Nikolaj Bundvig - additional drums (tracks: 3, 8)
- Peter Bruun - drums (track: 3), additional drums (track: 6)
- David Stubbe Teglbjærg - additional vocals (track: 8)
- Angela - tambourine (track: 8)

=== Technique ===
- Kirstine Stubbe Teglbjærg - Composing, Writing, Arranged, Recording, Producer
- Dyre Gormsen & Jon Schumann - mixing (tracks: 1, 7, 8)
- Adam Coel - assistant mix engineer
- Geoff Pesche - mastering
- Anders Wallin - drums recording (tracks: 3, 6, 8)
- Kajsa Gullberg - artwork, photography
