= Findlay Brown =

- Born: 1976 (age 49–50); York, North Yorkshire, England
- Genres: Pop, experimental, ambient
- Instruments: Guitar, vocals, piano, personal computer
- Years active: 2000–present
- Labels: Verve, Peacefrog, Nettwerk
- Website: findlaybrown.com

Findlay Brown is an English singer-songwriter and recording producer.

His debut studio album, Separated By the Sea (2007), was released by Peacefrog Records in the UK. It was produced by former Simian singer, Simon Lord. The Guardian gave the album 5/5 stars: "Brilliantly melancholic, the most unlikely classic of the year" *****". His second album, Love Will Find You (2010), was released by Verve Records. It was produced by ex-Suede guitarist Bernard Butler. His third album, Slow Light, was co-produced with Danish producer Tobias Wilner (Blue Foundation), and with influences drawing from minimalist music, soundtracks, African music and classic songwriting.

His music has been described as melodic, gentle and intimate, drawing on influences from the rural settings. His songs are inspired by nature, and use its imagery to convey a search for a more truthful way of living.

== Collaborations and touring ==
Findlay Brown has toured and collaborated with: Erol Alkan, Lily Allen, Au Revoir Simone, Carl Barât, Barbarossa, Bat for Lashes, Brendan Benson, Beyond the Wizard's Sleeve, Blue Foundation, Briganté, Bernard Butler, Alberta Cross, Drivin N Cryin, Duffy, Johnny Flynn, Bert Jansch, Keane, Simon Lord, Lovefingers, Luca C, Brendan Lynch, Shelby Lynne, Passenger, Fionn Regan, John Renbourn, The Sleepy Jackson, Angus and Julia Stone, Richard Swift, Taylor Swift, and Paul Weller, and at the Warchild Benefit Concert at Brixton Academy with the Pet Shop Boys.

In 2013, Brown formed a DJing duo with Xander Ferreira which they called The Happy Show, playing host at events – both in Brooklyn, where they are based, and elsewhere – to which they brought an "African groove". In describing these events, one reviewer said the pair had "created a joyous, ritualistic, dance gathering."

Brown's concerts and touring from 2006 to 2015 included major cities throughout Europe and the US. He has performed at all the major summer festivals, including CMJ Music Marathon, the End of the Road Festival, the Glastonbury Festival, the Latitude Festival, the Reading Festival, Secret Garden Party, and SXSW.

== TV and media ==
Findlay Brown appeared on the Late Show with David Letterman in January 2010 with a full orchestra. Findlay has performed several TV show appearances such as The Late Show with David Letterman, Top of the Pops and TARATATA. Radio support from radio hosts Zane Lowe and Jo Whiley (Radio 1) Ferne Cotton (Radio 2), John Kennedy (XFM), Rita Houston WFUV, KEXP, Deepak Chopra (Sirius Radio).

Findlay Brown has appeared in many major international media and publications, including: The Guardian, Mojo, The New York Times, Vice, The Sun, Vogue, Musicweek, The LA Times, Spin Magazine, Arena, Oprah, Uncut, Word, Drowned in Sound, Stereogum and many more.

His song "Come Home" was featured in a television advertisements for the credit card company MasterCard.

== Discography ==
=== Albums ===
- Separated By the Sea, Peacefrog, 2007.

Separated By the Sea
No.	Title	Length
1.	"I Will (Ghost Ship)"	5:17
2.	"But You Love Me"	3:19
3.	"Down Among The Deadmen"	4:31
4.	"Separated by the Sea"	2:35
5.	"Loneliness I Fear"	4:14
6.	"Come Home"	3:05
7.	"Losing The Will To Survive (Single Version)"	4:15
8.	"Paperman"	4:53
9.	"Tonight Wont Wait"	3:55
10.	"Don't You Know I Love You"	7:12
11.	"Twin Green Pram"	3:08

- Love Will Find You, Verve, 2010.

Love Will Find You
No.	Title	Length
1.	"Love Will Find You"	3:18
2.	"Nobody Cared"	3:57
3.	"All That I Have"	2:40
4.	"Everybody Needs Love"	4:33
5.	"That's Right"	2:27
6.	"Teardrops Lost in the Rain"	3:23
7.	"Holding Back The Night"	4:18
8.	"If I Could Do It Again (I'd Do It With You)"	2:37
9.	"I Still Want You"	2:02
10.	"I Had A Dream"	5:35

- Slow Light, Nettwerk, 2015.

Slow Light
No.	Title	Length
1.	"Run Home"	4:56
2.	"Made of Stone"	3:24
3.	"Make a Getaway"	5:52
4.	"The Mountain Falls for the Sea"	3:07
5.	"Emeralds"	1:44
6.	"All is Love"	4:53
7.	"Ride into the Sun"	3:36
8.	"Alone Again"	3:50
9.	"Born of the Stars"	3:30
10.	"Beyond the void (Part II)"	1:36

- Not Everything Beautiful Is Good, Nettwerk, 2018.
- Being Young Is Getting Old, Nettwerk, 2021.

=== Extended plays ===
- Don't You Know I Love You EP (2006)

Don't You Know I Love You EP (2006)
No.	Title	Length
1.	"Don't You Know I Love You"	2:59
2.	"Separated by the Sea"	2:37
3.	"Come Home"	3:05
4.	"Promised Land (Pilooski Edit)"	05:58
5.	"Polly"	03:43
6.	"Broken Every Rule"	2:52

- Versus EP (2009)

Versus EP (2009)
No.	Title	Length
1.	"Nobody Cared (Lynchmob Version)"	05:56
2.	"Nobody Cared (Lynchmob Beats)"	5:57
3.	"Stallions' Suite Featuring The Stallions"	10:35

- Promised Land EP (2010)

Promised Land EP (2010)
No.	Title	Length
1.	"Promised Land"	02:20
2.	"Promised Land (VillA Remix)"	07:47
3.	"Promised Land (Hypnolove Remix)"	04:15
4.	"Promised Land (Pilooski Edit)"	05:58
5.	"Promised Land (Mellow Remix)"	03:07
6.	"Promised Land (Acid Washed Remix)"	04:49

=== Singles ===
- Last Christmas (2006)
- Lean on Me (2017)
