= Sweep of Days =

Studio album by Blue Foundation
- Released: 2 February 2004
- Genres: Electronic, trip hop, pop
- Length: 54:46
- Label: Virgin Denmark
- Producers: Tobias Wilner, Bo Rande

Blue Foundation chronology
Blue Foundation (2001)	Sweep of Days (2004)	Life of a Ghost (2007)

Sweep of Days is the second full-length album released by Danish alternative rock group Blue Foundation. It was released in 2004 by Virgin Denmark.

== Track listing ==
1. "History" - 0:57
2. "As I Moved On" - 4:01
3. "End of the Day (Silence)" - 4:04
4. "Ricochet" - 6:01
5. "2:17 AM" - 3:01
6. "Embers" - 5:27
7. "Bonfires" - 4:15
8. "The Yellow Man" - 3:37
9. "Shine" - 4:47
10. "Save This Town" - 3:39
11. "Sweep" - 10:53
12. "My Day" - 10:00
  - Includes hidden track.

== Personnel ==
- Tobias Wilner a.k.a. Bichi - vocals, producer, guitar
- Kirstine Stubbe Teglbjærg a.k.a. Stern - vocals, guitar
- Scott Martingell a.k.a. MC Jabber - vocals, spoken word
- Tatsuki Oshima - turntable manipulation
- Bo Rande - synth, horn, producer
- Sune Martin - bass
