= Bella's Lullaby =

Composition by Carter Burwell

from the album Twilight: Original Motion Picture Soundtrack
- Released: November 4, 2008
- Recorded: September 2008
- Studio: Air Lyndhurst Studios
- Length: 2:20
- Label: Chop Shop; Atlantic
- Composer: Carter Burwell

Audio sample
- The theme as it was first featured in Twilight: file; help

"Bella's Lullaby" is a song composed by Carter Burwell for the 2008 movie Twilight. The song's motif features prominently throughout the franchise. It is considered the main theme of the movie's soundtrack.

== Background ==
"Bella's Lullaby" is mentioned in the novel Twilight. In the book, the song is composed on piano by Edward Cullen as a tribute of his love to Bella Swan. The song is referenced both throughout the book and in the sequel New Moon.

== Composition and recording ==
The song that would become known as "Bella's Lullaby" was originally composed by Carter Burwell for his partner, Christine Sciulli, when they were having relationship issues. It was written by Burwell after Sciulli had temporarily left him. According to Burwell, it was meant to "speak of love—ecstatic, tormented love". The two reconciled and later married.

The piece is composed of two different themes. Burwell describes an "A" theme that "is a bit ambiguous, like two people trying to find a common ground, climbing to a high, then tumbling down", and a "B" theme that he considers "forthrightly joyful".

When Twilight director Catherine Hardwicke approached Burwell about scoring the film, he understood that "Bella's Lullaby" would be an important part of the soundtrack. He believed the emotions behind his prior composition would be appropriate to use for the song. Burwell and Hardwicke originally referred to the track as "Love Theme".

Burwell recorded the song in September 2008 at Air Lyndhurst Studios in London. He utilized a 24-piece orchestra for the track.

== In the films ==
The song was not originally going to feature in the films. Summit Entertainment requested a piano scene to be added to the script in response to growing anticipation in the blogosphere about the soundtrack, as fans were curious about how "Bella's Lullaby" would be presented. Robert Pattinson, the actor who played Edward, composed an original piece to use as the lullaby. The "Bella's Lullaby" scene in Twilight was originally shot using Pattinson's composition, but was later scrapped in favor of Burwell's.

Unlike in the books, the song remains unnamed in the film. Edward is shown playing the song, but it is not specified that he composed it for Bella. In Twilight, the melody occurs several times as a reprise.

== Release and reception ==
The song was released as part of the Twilight: Original Motion Picture Soundtrack on November 4, 2008 through Chop Shop Records and Atlantic Records. Summit Entertainment provided a free remix of "Bella's Lullaby" through iTunes, with the purchase of a Twilight theatre ticket through online ticket services Fandango or MovieTickets.com.

The track was well received, and became a popular song for beginners and fans of the franchise to learn on piano. Burwell received a large amount of fan mail in response. Despite this, he was not invited to score the next movie in the franchise. However, the song's popularity contributed to Burwell's return as composer for Breaking Dawn – Part 1 and Breaking Dawn – Part 2.

Taylor Bryant of Nylon described the song as "instantly iconic". Meredith Goldstein of The Boston Globe praised the song for its "dissonant and longing melody that provokes the emotions one might experience when falling for one's prey." Nasya Blackshear of The List stated, "for a classical piece, the song is a certified banger."

== In other media ==
In 2020, the song resurged in popularity as a TikTok trend. Videos featuring the melody were juxtaposed with scenes of aggressive twerking and fist pumping. The trend was first popularized by Issa Twaimz.
