= Kirstine Stubbe Teglbjærg =

- Origin: Denmark
- Genres: Indie, Indie Pop, Ambient, Downtempo, Electronic, Art rock
- Instruments: Vocals, guitar, synths, computer, keyboards.
- Years active: 1995–present
- Label: HUN SOLO Records // A:Larm/Universal // Warner
- Formerly of: Blue Foundation
- Website: www.sitrekin.com

Kirstine Stubbe Teglbjærg is a Danish composer, singer, and producer. She is well known for having been the lead singer and songwriter for Blue Foundation. In June 2021, she launched her new project Sitrekin.

== Career ==
She was the lead singer for Blue Foundation until 2009 and was nominated for several awards for her work in this band.

Since her departure, she has been making music underground. She worked in her own studio Copenhagen until the release of her first solo album in 2012. She wanted to find her very own and unique sound.

== Discography ==
=== Blue Foundation ===
Albums
2001: Blue Foundation (April Records)
2004: Sweep of Days (Virgin/EMI)
2006: Solid Origami – Blue Foundation Collected and Re-worked (Only Japan, Popgroup)
2007: Life of a Ghost (Virgin/EMI)

Singles
1999: Hide/Hollywood (MoshiMoshi)
2000: Wise Guy/Hollywood. Inclusive remixes by The Prunes, Future 3 and Pelding (April Records)
2003: As I moved on. Inclusive remixes by Run Jeremy Band and Bichi (Virgin/EMI)
2004: End of the day (Virgin/EMI)
2005: Embers (Jack to Phono)
2005: This is goodbye (Virgin/EMI)
2006: Crosshair (Virgin/EMI)
2006: Sweep – Mikkel Metal, 16 Bit Lolitas, Jim Rivers Remixes (Okyo/Renaissance)
2007: Enemy (Virgin/EMI)
2009: Eyes On Fire (Astralwerks USA)
2009: Watch you sleeping Featuring Mark Kozelek – Sun kil Moon (Dead Peoples Choice)

=== Solo work ===
Album
2013: Hamskifte (A:larm/Universal)

EP
2013: Hamskifte Remixes (A:larm/Universal)

Singles
2012: Drømmenes Lyd (A:larm/Universal)
2013: Tæppet er faldet (A:larm/Universal)

=== Collaboration ===
2020: Rapture (Belau featuring Kirstine Stubbe Teglbjærg)

2014: Never be apart (Bottled in England featuring Kirstine Stubbe Teglbjærg)
2015: Runnin’ (Bogan Via featuring Kirstine Stubbe Teglbjærg)

== Modern dance ==
She has composed music for theatre and modern dance performances.

2018: Charles. Nørregaards Teater Odense.

2015: Men Nu Har Jeg En Hjærne. Det menneskelige Teater/KBH's Musikteater.
2014: Alting Mødes. Det Flydende Teater
2012: Blackout! (MUTE Comp. Physical Theatre)
2009: Når jeg forsvinder under mig. (JacoBole Teatret/CampX)
2004: Baby/Baby (Copenhagen Performance House)
2003: SnapShots (Nyt Dansk Danseteater)
2003: Hendrix House: (Tim Feldmann/Wilda Dance)

== Awards ==
Year	Nominee / work	Award	Result
2005	Sweep of Days	Danish Music Awards: Best Urban Album of the year	Won
2005	Blue Foundation	Danish Music Awards: Best Act of the year	Nominated
2005	Kirstine Stubbe Teglbjærg	Danish Music Awards: Female singer of the year	Nominated
2005	Blue Foundation	Steppeulven (The critics prize): Band of the year	Nominated
2005	Blue Foundation	Steppeulven (The critics prize): Best live act of the year	Nominated
2006	Blue Foundation's "This is Goodbye" (From the film Drabet)	Robert Awards: Song of the year	Nominated
