= Twilight (soundtrack) =

Soundtrack to 2008 film

Twilight: Original Motion Picture Soundtrack

Soundtrack album by various artists
- Released: November 4, 2008
- Recorded: Various times
- Genres: Pop rock; alternative rock; soundtrack
- Length: 45:30
- Labels: Chop Shop; Atlantic
- Producers: Alexandra Patsavas; Paul Katz

Singles from Twilight: Original Motion Picture Soundtrack
- 1. "Decode" Released: October 21, 2008; 2. "Go All the Way (Into the Twilight)" Released: October 23, 2008

Professional ratings
Review scores
Source	Rating
AllMusic	3/5 stars
Entertainment Weekly	A−

Twilight: Original Motion Picture Soundtrack is the official soundtrack to Twilight, released on November 4, 2008.

The soundtrack was chosen by music supervisor Alexandra Patsavas; while the score, Twilight: The Score, was composed by Carter Burwell. The soundtrack album was released by Patsavas' Chop Shop label in conjunction with Atlantic Records. It debuted at number 1 on the Billboard 200, having sold about 165,000 copies in its first week of release, 29% of which were digital downloads. Twilight: The Score was made available for digital download on November 25, 2008, and the album was released to stores on December 9, 2008.

Twilight is the best-selling theatrical movie soundtrack in the United States since Chicago. Both the soundtrack and the lead single, "Decode" by Paramore, were nominated for the 2010 Grammy Awards.

== Twilight: Original Motion Picture Soundtrack ==
Director Catherine Hardwicke revealed in an interview with MTV that a song by alternative rock band Muse, later revealed to be "Supermassive Black Hole", would be included on the film's soundtrack. The soundtrack includes two songs by Paramore, a new song by Mutemath, and an original song for the film by Perry Farrell. "Flightless Bird, American Mouth" by Iron & Wine was chosen for inclusion in the movie by actress Kristen Stewart, who plays Bella Swan. The soundtrack won a 2009 American Music Award for Favorite Soundtrack.

=== Marketing ===
The CD booklet on the physical CD folds out into one of four Twilight posters. Hot Topic locations across the United States hosted exclusive Twilight soundtrack listening parties on October 24. Albums bought at Borders bookstores feature an acoustic version of Paramore's "Decode". Summit Entertainment provided a free remix of "Bella's Lullaby" through iTunes, with the purchase of a Twilight theatre ticket through online ticket services Fandango or MovieTickets.com.

=== Track listing ===
Twilight – Standard edition
No.	Title	Writer(s)	Artist	Length
1.	"Supermassive Black Hole"	Matthew Bellamy	Muse	3:31
2.	"Decode"	Hayley Williams; Josh Farro; Taylor York	Paramore	4:21
3.	"Full Moon"	Simon William Lord; Theo Keating	The Black Ghosts	3:50
4.	"Leave Out All the Rest"	Linkin Park	Linkin Park	3:19
5.	"Spotlight" (Twilight Mix)	Paul Meany; Dennis Herring; Tedd Tjornhom	Mutemath	3:20
6.	"Go All the Way (Into the Twilight)"	Perry Farrell; Etty Lau Farrell; Carl Restivo; Atticus Ross	Perry Farrell	3:27
7.	"Tremble for My Beloved"	Ed Roland	Collective Soul	3:53
8.	"I Caught Myself"	Hayley Williams; Josh Farro	Paramore	3:55
9.	"Eyes On Fire"	Tobias Wilner Bertram; Kirstine Stubbe Teglbjærg	Blue Foundation	5:01
10.	"Never Think"	Robert Pattinson; Sam Bradley	Robert Pattinson	4:29
11.	"Flightless Bird, American Mouth"	Samuel Beam	Iron & Wine	4:02
12.	"Bella's Lullaby"	Carter Burwell	Carter Burwell	2:20
Total length:				45:30

Twilight – iTunes bonus tracks
No.	Title	Writer(s)	Artist	Length
13.	"Let Me Sign"	Bobby Long; Marcus Foster	Robert Pattinson	2:18
14.	"La Traviata"	Giuseppe Verdi	Royal Philharmonic Orchestra	3:05
15.	"Clair de Lune"	Claude Debussy	The APM Orchestra	5:58
Total length:				56:51

Twilight – Deluxe edition bonus tracks
No.	Title	Writer(s)	Artist	Length
13.	"Love Is Worth the Fall"	Richard On; Marc Roberge	O.A.R.	3:38
14.	"Decode" (Acoustic)	Hayley Williams; Josh Farro; Taylor York	Paramore	4:27
15.	"Flightless Bird, American Mouth" (Live)	Samuel Beam	Iron & Wine	4:14
16.	"Spotlight" (Son Lux Remix)	Paul Meany; Dennis Herring; Tedd Tjornhom	Mutemath	3:27
17.	"Full Moon" (Appleblim And Komonazmuk Remix)	Simon Lord; Theo Keating	The Black Ghosts	4:53
Total length:				66:09

Twilight – Deluxe edition DVD
No.	Title	Artist	Length
1.	"Alex Patsavas" (Interview)
2.	"Hayley Williams" (Interview)
3.	"Decode" (Music video)	Paramore	4:11
4.	"Decode" (Beyond the video)	Paramore	4:20
5.	"Full Moon" (Music video)	The Black Ghosts	4:09
6.	"Flightless Bird, American Mouth" (Live)	Iron & Wine

Notes

- The first song of the ending credits, Radiohead's "15 Step" (3:59), was not included on the soundtrack.

=== Singles ===
- "Decode", by Paramore, was the first single released from the soundtrack. It premiered on Paramore's fan club site and Stephenie Meyer's official website on October 1, 2008. The music video for "Decode" premiered on November 3. The song was certified Platinum in the U.S. on February 16, 2010, selling over 1,000,000 copies. It was also nominated for a Grammy Award in 2010 for Best Song Written for a Movie.
- "Go All the Way (Into the Twilight)" by Perry Farrell was the second single released from the soundtrack. It premiered on Meyer's website on October 23, 2008.

=== Chart performance ===
The Twilight soundtrack debuted at #1 on the Billboard 200, selling 165,000 copies in its first week, according to Nielsen Soundscan. Twilight is the first soundtrack to hit #1 in advance of its film's release since the 8 Mile soundtrack in 2002. The album was certified double platinum on April 16, 2009. After a re-release of the album in a "Deluxe Edition" in March, 2009, it climbed from #14 to #3 on the Billboard 200, selling 74,000 copies. It remained on the Billboard 200 for 48 consecutive weeks. As of April 2014, the album has sold 2,807,000 copies in the US.

The soundtrack peaked at number one in New Zealand on February 9, 2009, and has been certified platinum, selling over 15,000 copies. The album has been certified gold in Mexico, selling over 50,000 copies.

=== Charts ===
==== Weekly charts ====
Chart (2008–2009)	Peak position
Argentine Albums (CAPIF)	5
Australian Albums (ARIA)	2
Austrian Albums (Ö3 Austria)	2
Belgian Albums (Ultratop Flanders)	37
Belgian Albums (Ultratop Wallonia)	23
Canadian Albums (Billboard)	4
Finnish Albums (Suomen virallinen lista)	14
French Albums (SNEP)	4
German Albums (Offizielle Top 100)	4
Greek Albums (IFPI)	1
Hungarian Albums (MAHASZ)	25
Mexican Albums (AMPROFON)	5
Mexican International Albums Chart	2
New Zealand Albums (RMNZ)	1
Spanish Albums (Promusicae)	17
Swiss Albums (Schweizer Hitparade)	8
US Billboard 200	1
US Top Rock Albums (Billboard)	1
US Soundtrack Albums (Billboard)	1

==== Year-end charts ====
Chart (2008)	Position
US Billboard 200	147
US Soundtrack Albums (Billboard)	19
Chart (2009)	Position
Australian Albums (ARIA)	11
Austrian Albums (Ö3 Austria)	24
Belgian Albums (Ultratop Wallonia)	60
Canadian Albums (Billboard)	11
French Albums (SNEP)	35
German Albums (Offizielle Top 100)	15
New Zealand Albums (RMNZ)	18
Swiss Albums (Schweizer Hitparade)	35
US Billboard 200	4
US Top Rock Albums (Billboard)	2
US Soundtrack Albums (Billboard)	1
Chart (2010)	Position
US Billboard 200	108
US Top Rock Albums (Billboard)	37
US Soundtrack Albums (Billboard)	11

=== Certifications ===
Region	Certification	Certified units/sales
Australia (ARIA)	2× Platinum	140,000^{^}
Austria (IFPI Austria)	Gold	10,000^{*}
Canada (Music Canada)	2× Platinum	160,000^{^}
France (SNEP)	Platinum	100,000^{*}
Germany (BVMI)	Platinum	200,000^{^}
Hungary (MAHASZ)	Gold	3,000^{^}
Italy (FIMI)	Gold	30,000^{*}
Mexico (AMPROFON)	Gold	40,000^{^}
New Zealand (RMNZ)	Platinum	15,000^{^}
Poland (ZPAV)	Gold	10,000^{*}
Russia (NFPF)	Gold	10,000^{*}
Spain (Promusicae)	Gold	40,000^{^}
United Kingdom (BPI)	Platinum	300,000^{*}
United States (RIAA)	2× Platinum	2,807,000
^{*} Sales figures based on certification alone.^{^} Shipments figures based on certification alone.

== Twilight: The Score ==
Twilight: The Score

Film score by Carter Burwell
- Released: December 9, 2008
- Recorded: September 2008
- Studio: Air Lyndhurst Studios in London
- Genre: Orchestral
- Length: 46:53
- Label: Atlantic

Carter Burwell chronology
Burn After Reading (2008)	Twilight: The Score (2008)	A Serious Man (2009)

Professional ratings
Review scores
Source	Rating
Allmusic	3.5/5 stars
Filmtracks	2/5 stars
Movie Music UK	2.5/5 stars

Carter Burwell composed and orchestrated the score for Twilight over a 9- to 10-week period, and it was recorded and mixed in about 2 weeks in late September 2008. He began the score with a "Love Theme" for Bella and Edward's relationship, a variation of which became "Bella's Lullaby" that Robert Pattinson plays in the film and that is included on the Twilight Original Motion Picture Soundtrack. The original theme is featured throughout the film, and serves to "play the romance that drives the story". Another theme Burwell composed was a "Predator Theme", which opens the film, and is intended to play Edward's vampire nature. Other themes include a bass-line, drum beat and distorted guitar sound for the nomadic vampires, and a melody for the Cullen family. Twilight: The Score was released digitally on November 25, 2008, and in stores on December 9. The score album had sold 218,000 copies in the United States as of June 2010.

=== Track listing ===
No.	Title	Length
1.	"How I Would Die"	1:53
2.	"Who Are They?"	3:26
3.	"Treaty"	1:58
4.	"Phascination Phase"	2:04
5.	"Humans Are Predators Too"	2:04
6.	"I Dreamt of Edward"	1:06
7.	"I Know What You Are"	2:40
8.	"The Most Dangerous Predator"	2:19
9.	"The Skin of a Killer"	2:58
10.	"The Lion Fell in Love with the Lamb"	3:10
11.	"Complications"	1:12
12.	"Dinner with His Family"	0:38
13.	"I Would Be the Meal"	1:24
14.	"Bella's Lullaby"	2:18
15.	"Nomads"	3:51
16.	"Stuck Here Like Mom"	1:40
17.	"Bella Is Part of the Family"	1:24
18.	"Tracking"	2:19
19.	"In Place of Someone You Love"	1:46
20.	"Showdown in the Ballet Studio"	4:59
21.	"Edward at Her Bed"	0:56
Total length:		50:02

=== Chart performance ===
Chart (2008)	Peak position
Australian Albums (ARIA)	52
US Billboard 200	65
