= Boris Benjamin Bertram =

Danish film director (born 1971)

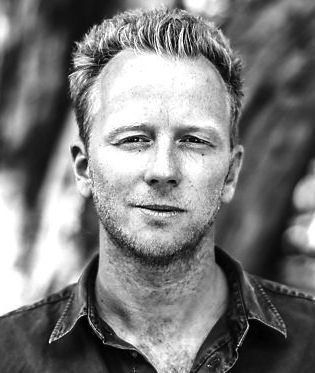
- Born: 29 December 1971 (age 54)
- Occupations: Film director, cinematographer, producer

Boris Benjamin Bertram (born 29 December 1971) is a Danish film director, keynote speaker, producer and partner in Good Company Pictures, a documentary production company based in Copenhagen.

== Life and career ==
Bertram studied documentary film making at National Film School of Denmark and Social Psychology and Communication at Roskilde University.

Bertram worked as a radio journalist at Copenhagen Homeless Radio. In 1999, he joined the creative department of Zentropa Real and worked on the documentaries The Five Obstructions and The Erotic Man as an assistant director with Lars Von Trier and Jørgen Leth. He has directed a few television series for DR1 and TV2.

Bertram's films focus on international issues and conflict resolution. In 2018, he directed the documentary The Human Shelter with the support of IKEA, with both concerned to talk about what makes a home around the world.

In 2019, he directed Photographer of War, which follows Danish war photographer Jan Grarup. The film was nominated for a Robert Award from the Danish Academy Awards.

== Filmography ==
- An Elephant in the Room (2020) – Executive producer
- Prelle – In My Own Voice (2020) – Executive producer
- Photographer of War/Krigsfotografen (2019) – Film Director, cinematographer
- Don't Give a Fox (2019) – Executive Producer
- The Human Shelter (2018) – Film Director, producer
- False Confessions (2018) – Executive Producer
- Heroes of Hell/Helvedes helte (2014) – Film Director
- The War Campaign/Krigskampagnen (2013) – Film Director
- The Seduced Man/Det forførte menneske (2011) – Film Photographer
- The Erotic Human (2010) – Assistant director: Brazil
- Chips & Liver Girls (2010) – Film Director
- Tank City/Tankograd (2009) – Film Director
- Diplomacy: The Responsibility to Protect (2008) – Film Director
- Great Danes/Store danskere (2005) – Film director
- My Beirut (2005) – Film Director

== Awards ==
Film	Year	Category	Film festival
War Photographer	2020	Nominee Robert Best Documentary Shared with: Katrine Sahlstrøm (producer)	Danish Film Awards (Robert)
War Photographer	2020		Prague, One World Human Rights Film Festival
War Photographer	2019		Lübeck, Nordische Filmtage
War Photographer	2019		Leipzig, Festival for Documentary and Animation
War Photographer	2019		São Paulo, Int. Film Festival
War Photographer	2019		Malmö, Nordisk Panorama
Chips & Liver Girls	2011		Rotterdam, International Film Festival
Chips & Liver Girls	2010		CPH:DOX
Tankograd	2011		Helsinki, Doc Point Documentary Film Festival
Tankograd	2010		Hot Docs International Documentary Festival
Tankograd	2009	Nominee Amnesty Award	CPH:DOX
Diplomacy- the responsibility to protect	2008		Odense Internationale Film Festival
