= Blue Foundation (album) =

Studio album by Blue Foundation
- Released: 19 January 2001
- Genre: Electronic, trip hop
- Length: 49:50

Blue Foundation chronology
Blue Foundation (2001)	Sweep of Days (2003)

Blue Foundation is an album by the band Blue Foundation.

== Track listing ==
All music is composed by Blue Foundation.

No.	Title	Length
1.	"Wiseguy"	5:05
2.	"Grand"	5:02
3.	"Witch of Trouble"	3:39
4.	"Crushed"	3:06
5.	"Jabber"	4:18
6.	"Hollywood"	3:57
7.	"Burgeon"	1:50
8.	"Black S"	4:53
9.	"Mazda"	0:58
10.	"Hide"	4:06
11.	"Cutting Me Up"	3:57
12.	"J.Hurt"	4:18
13.	"Evo"	4:41
Total length:		49:50
