= Briganté =

Briganté is a rock/indie/alternative band from Bedford, United Kingdom. They are known for singing in a deep melodic style.

== Beginnings ==
Simon Cronin (lead singer), Chris Mills (electric guitar), Padraig Clarke (3/4 guitar) and Luke Fattorusso (bass guitar/backing vocals) were initially part of a cover band. After little success performing in several local gigs raising money for charity, the cover band eventually ran its course. At this point it was decided that a new band should be formed with some of the members from the original. This led to the creation of Rate of the Day (ROTD) in May 2006.

While predominantly an indie band, ROTD branched into areas of rock and roll and alternative rock, with songs such as "Waging War" and "Takin' Part". Stephen Pagano, the original drummer, left the band soon after. With an ad on a local advertising website, Dan Meese joined the crew as the new drummer.

As the band progressed through the next year, they renamed themselves Briganté. Under this name, the band performed gigs in London venues such as The Hope and Anchor, The Bullet Bar, and Bar Monsta. Local gigs have included the prestigious Red Stripe Music Awards at Bedford Esquires. Here Briganté enlisted Jimmy Tippet from Dual Calibre to create an intro piece climaxing with the words "New Improved Briganté".

== Notable performances ==
- Esquires (Bedford) – December 2006 First live performance
- Ro'woodstock (Rovigo, Italy) – September 2007
- BBC Three Counties Radio Live Session – October 2007
- The Grafton Hotel (Bedford) - November 2007, booed off stage during a near riot.
- The Bullet Bar – December 2007, first London performance
- Hope and Anchor (London, Islington) – January 2008
- Redstripe Music Awards 2008, Esquires (Bedford) – April 2008
- River Festival, Main Stage (Bedford) – July 2008

== Management ==
Throughout Briganté's early history as Rate of the Day, their appearances were plagued through poor management and a lack of professional direction off stage. Matthew Ford had been given legal executive of the band's facto but due to an embarrassing mishap at Bedford St Johns train station, he was unable to attend any of the early gigs. CCTV footage appeared to place Mr Ford at Kempston Hardwick around the time of an important London gig. Other sources have linked this event to a relapse of a failed journey to Brighton years earlier. Briganté have since severed all professional ties with Mr Ford although they still remain on talking terms.

== Discography ==
The first EP was recorded in 2007, containing four songs:

1. "Takin' Part (The Only Way I Know How)"
2. "Things to Come"
3. "I Say Nothing"
4. "Waging War"
5. "My old man's a dustman" (hidden track)

It was recorded at Sound Arc Studios in Shefford, Bedfordshire. The band were then set to record their next album within the following year.
