= Tobias Wilner =

- Wilner in 2011

Background information
- Genres: Dream pop, electronica, shoegaze, minimalism, experimental music
- Years active: 1997–present
- Labels: EMI, Astralwerks, Moshi Moshi, Dead People's Choice, Hobby Industries, Warner Music Group
- Formerly of: Bichi, Blue Foundation, Ghost Society, New York United, Tachys
- Website: www.tobiaswilnerofficial.com

Wilner in 2016

Tobias Wilner is a Danish composer, musician, record producer, photographer, and film director. He's best known as bandleader and lead vocalist from the band Blue Foundation and his film score for the Danish financial crime thriller Follow The Money. He is a member and producer of the bands Blue Foundation, Tachys, Ghost Society, Bichi and New York United.

He has performed and recorded with Mark Kozelek, Erika Spring (Au Revoir Simone), Jonas Bjerre, Daniel Carter, Federico Ughi, DJ Krush, Mew, Sara Savery, Sonya Kitchell, Findlay Brown, Apparatjik, and others.

His music has been featured in films like Twilight, Miami Vice and on TV shows like CSI: Miami and The Vampire Diaries.

He works as a film composer, record producer, songwriter, and performing artist.

He has directed music videos for Ravages, Drop The Gun, Sara Savery and Blue Foundation.

== Discography ==
=== Albums ===
- 2000: Wise Guy – Blue Foundation, April Records
- 2001: Blue Foundation – Blue Foundation, April Records
- 2004: Sweep of Days – Blue Foundation, EMI
- 2006: Solid Origami – Blue Foundation, Popgroup
- 2006: Dead People's Choice – Blue Foundation, EMI
- 2007: Life of a Ghost – Blue Foundation, Astralwerks
- 2009: Notwithstanding – Bichi, Hobby Industries
- 2010: Tankograd Original Soundtrack – Tobias Wilner, Dead People's Choice Records
- 2012: In My Mind I Am Free – Blue Foundation, Dead People's Choice Records
- 2013: In My Mind I Am Free Reconstructed – Blue Foundation, Dead People's Choice Records
- 2016: Bedrag Original Soundtrack – Tobias Wilner, Dead People's Choice Records
- 2016: Slow Light – Findlay Brown, Nettwerk
- 2016: Blood Moon – Blue Foundation, Dead People's Choice Records
- 2018: New York United – New York United, 577 Records
- 2019: Human Shelter Original Score – Tobias Wilner, KØИ Records
- 2019: Silent Dream – Blue Foundation, KØИ Records
- 2019: New York United Vol. 2 – New York United, 577 Records
- 2019: Photographer of War Original Score – Tobias Wilner, KØИ Records
- 2022: Tachys – Tachys, KØИ Records
- 2025: Close To The Knife - Blue Foundation

=== EP's ===
- 2008: Erobreren – Bichi, Cactus Island Records
- 2010: Dogs and Desperation – Ghost Society, Minty Fresh
- 2015: Live in Zhangbei – Blue Foundation, Dead People's Choice Records
- 2016: Eyes On Fire Re-worked – Blue Foundation, Dead People's Choice Records
- 2016: It Begins – Blue Foundation, Dead People's Choice Records

=== As sideman ===
- 1997: A Triumph For Man – Mew, Evil Office
- 2003: Frengers – Mew, Epic Records
- 2004: Jaku – DJ Krush, Sony Music
- 2013: Lost – Trentemøller, In My Room

=== Soundtracks ===
- 2005: The O.C. (TV Series)
- 2005: Drabet
- 2006: Miami Vice
- 2007: Anna Pihl (TV Series)
- 2008: CSI:Miami
- 2008: Twilight
- 2009: Normal
- 2009: Nobody
- 2009: So You Think You Can Dance(TV Series)
- 2010: Waking Madison
- 2012: The Vampire Diaries(TV Series)
- 2015: Light The Wick
- 2016: LA Boys
- 2017: Peelers
- 2018: Deception(TV Series)

=== Film Score ===
- 2001: Stacy Ann Chin
- 2003: Urge
- 2005: My Beirut
- 2008: Diplomacy – the responsibility to protect
- 2009: All Boys
- 2010: Tankograd
- 2013: The War Campaign
- 2016: Follow the Money (Danish TV series)
- 2018: Human Shelter
- 2019: Photographer Of War
- 2023: The Shadow War
