= Blue Foundation =

Musical group

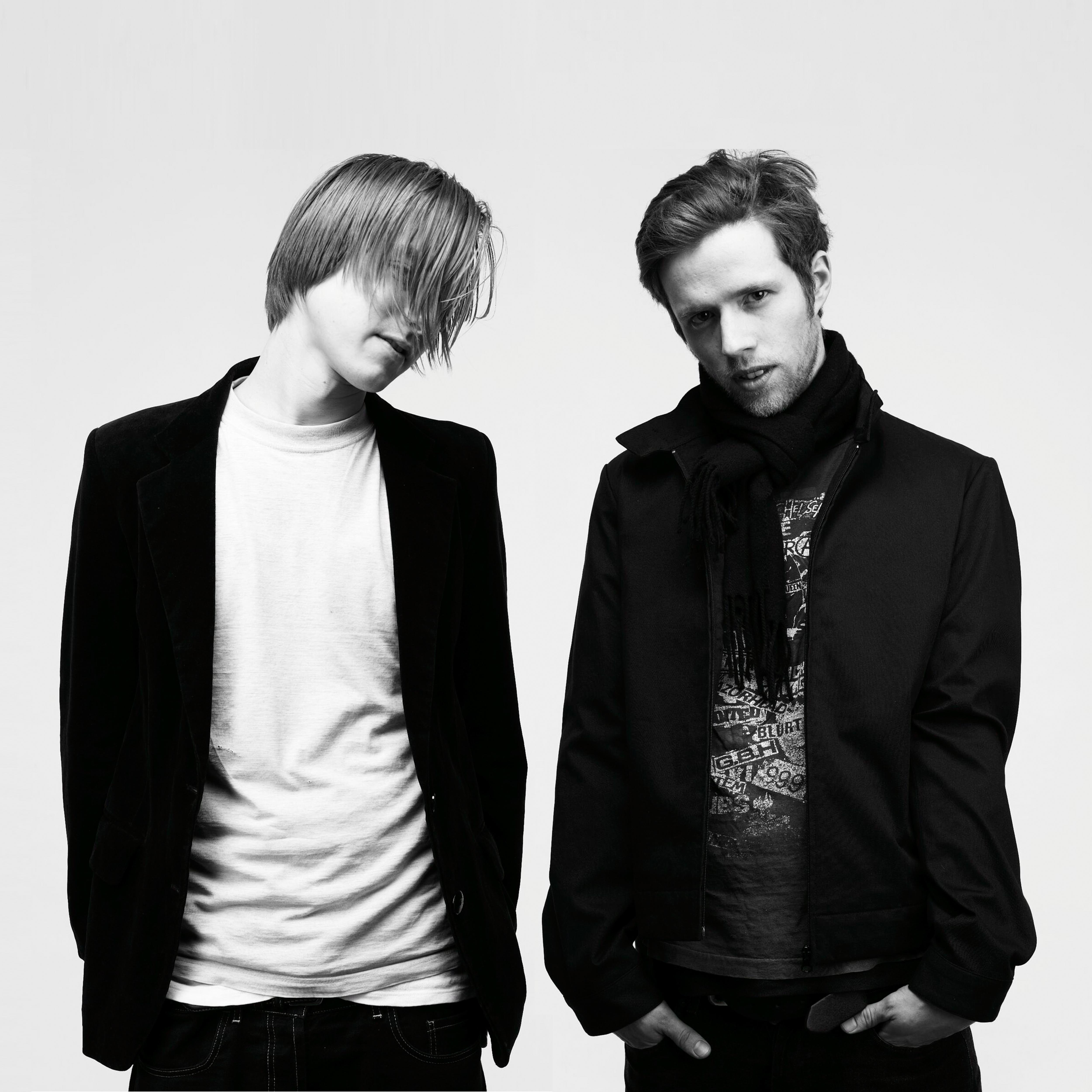

Background information
- Genres: Electronica; shoegaze; dream pop
- Years active: 2000–present
- Labels: Moshi Moshi, Astralwerks, EMI, Virgin, DPC, KON Records
- Members: Tobias Wilner; Bo Rande
- Past members: Anders Bertram; Tatsuki Oshima; Scott Martingell; Frederik Hantho; Daisuke Kiyasu; Kirstine Teglbjærg; Hans Landgreen; Mathias Hantho; Lasse Herbst; Sune Martin; Anders Wallin; Nikolaj Bundvig; Emil Bernild Ferslev
- Website: bluefoundationofficial.com

Blue Foundation is a Danish band. Their cinematic dream pop, shoegaze and electronics inspired compositions are known for being featured in films such as Twilight and Miami Vice, and on television series including CSI: Miami and The Vampire Diaries.

Danish singer, multi-instrumentalist, and producer Tobias Wilner founded the group in 2000, inspired by Mark E. Smith's approach to forming a band (the Fall), recruiting a rotating cast of traditional musicians throughout the band's history to inspire creativity. Since 2010 the core of the band has been Tobias Wilner and Bo Rande, based in Crown Heights, Brooklyn and Copenhagen, Denmark.

Blue Foundation released their fifth album Blood Moon worldwide on 2 September 2016. The album featured appearances from Mark Kozelek (Sun Kil Moon / Red House Painters), Erika Spring (Au Revoir Simone / Nice As Fuck), Jonas Bjerre (Mew), Sonya Kitchell, Sara Savery (aka Drop the Gun) and Findlay Brown.

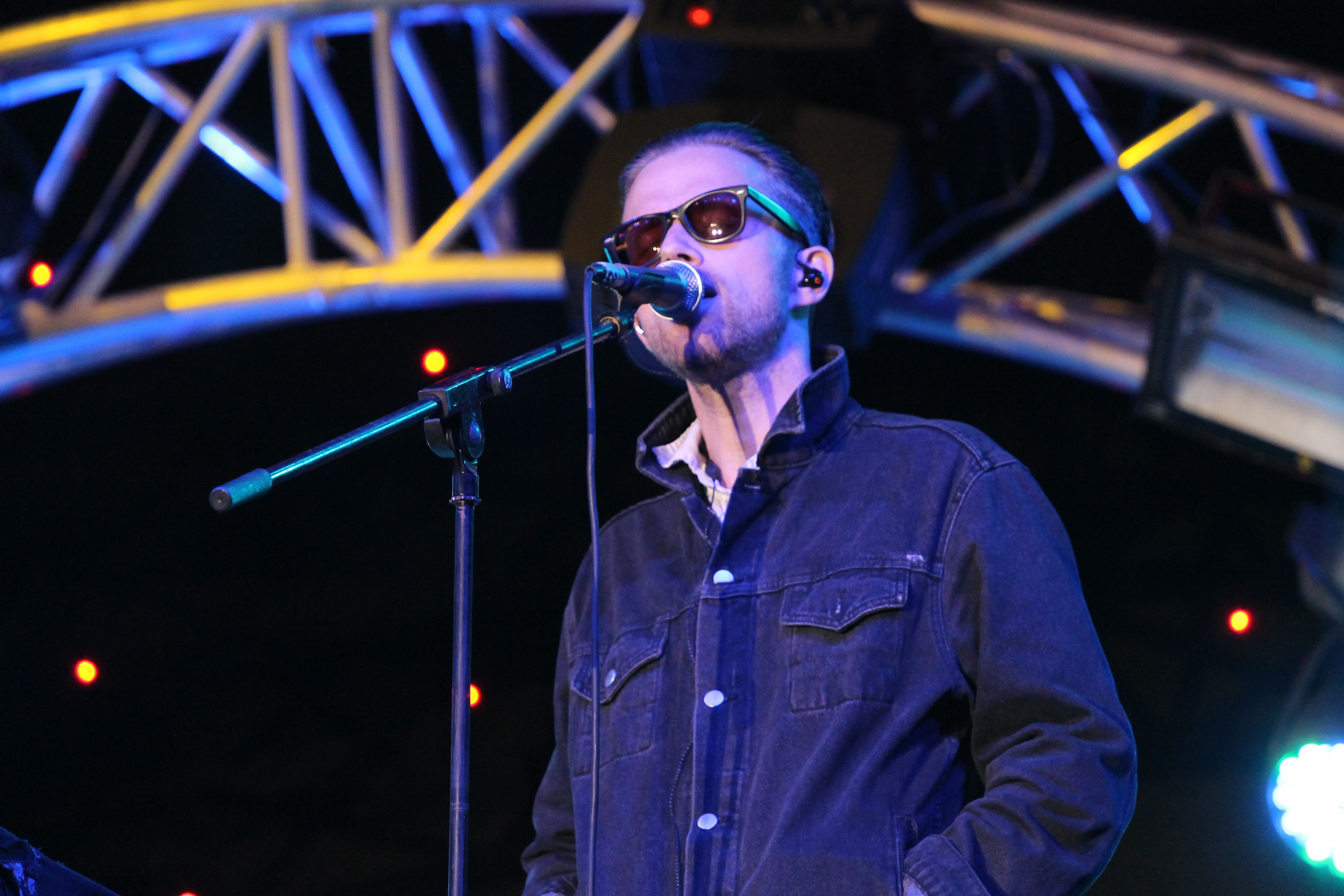
Lead singer Tobias Wilner in concert, 2016

Tobias Wilner is active recording and touring with his side project New York United, an experimental band featuring Daniel Carter, Federico Ughi, and Djibril Toure. The dream pop electronic project Tachys, with the lead singer of Mew, Jonas Bjerre, is also noteworthy. He has released music under the alias Bichi and with his shoegaze band Ghost Society. Additionally, he composes music for films and TV, both under his own name and as Blue Foundation. Bo Rande is active with the Choir of Young Believers.

== History ==
Blue Foundation was founded in 2000 in Copenhagen and grew out of the musical collaboration between Tobias Wilner, aka Bichi, his brother Anders Mannov Bertram, and Kirstine Stubbe Teglbjærg. Tobias Wilner, the band's primary driving force and captain, came up with the name Blue Foundation in 1999.

Blue Foundation released their first 7" via Moshi Moshi Records, and their first, self-titled, album was released shortly thereafter. Three years later, in 2003, the band signed with EMI/Warner Music, releasing two albums, released in the US through Astralwerks Records.

In October 2005, Tobias Wilner released an album with his side project, Bichi. The title of the album is Notwithstanding, and is released by Thomas Knak on his label, Hobby Industries. Some of the Bichi work would later turn into Blue Foundation songs. The Blue Foundation song, This is Goodbye, from the movie Manslaughter, was originally the instrumental song Revolve in the Sun/My Footfalls Are Superfluous, from the album Notwithstanding. Also, the Bichi song It Begins, featured in the movie Waking Madison, by Katherine Brooks, was re-recorded and later released as a Blue Foundation version.

In 2007, Blue Foundation released their third studio album, Life of a Ghost. The album was recorded in Copenhagen, with Tobias Wilner as producer and engineer, and Bo Rande as co-producer. The album was released in 2007 on EMI Records in Denmark and on Astralwerks in the USA in 2009. Life of a Ghost features "Eyes on Fire," written by Tobias Wilner and Kirstine Stubbe Teglbjærg.

In 2008, Blue Foundation established their own imprint, Dead Peoples Choice, which has so far released two albums and one remix album. Currently, they release under the imprint KON Records.Blue Foundation gained major recognition with a remix by Zeds Dead of their song "Eyes On Fire", reaching a no. 3 ranking on iTunes Electronic Music Chart (2014). "Eyes On Fire" currently has more than 35 million YouTube plays, while the "Zeds Dead"-remix has exceeded 170 million YouTube plays. Over the years, Blue Foundation has expanded their audience, embracing today both the underground and the alternative mainstream.

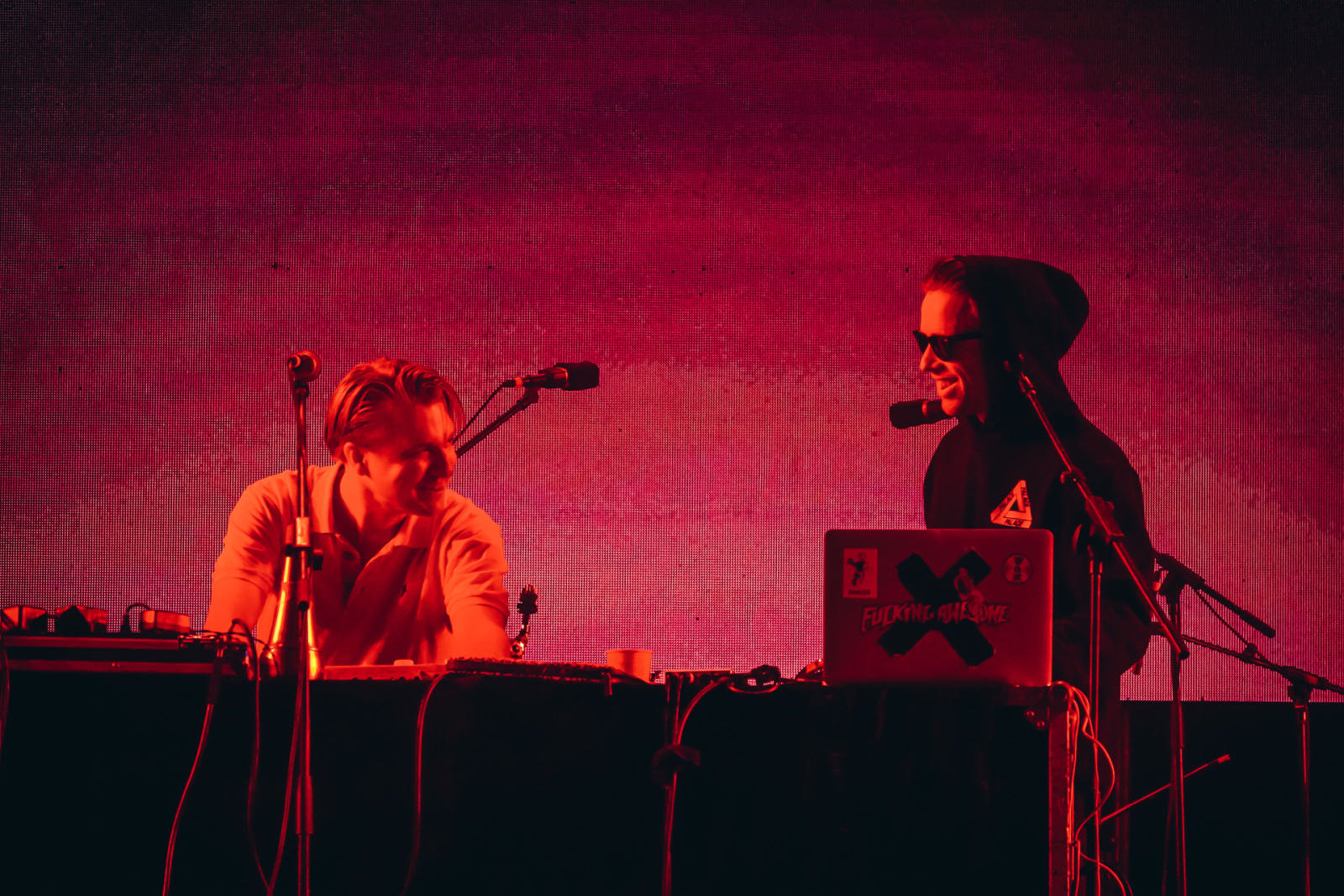
Blue Foundation founder and lead singer Tobias Wilner and Bo Rande. Photo By Jesse Ball

Blue Foundation has been featured in major films such as Twilight, Miami Vice and on TV shows including CSI: Miami and The Vampire Diaries. Their music is sampled by ex Lil Durk feat. French Montana on "Fly High", Young Thug on "She Noticed", and on Curren$y's "Hustler".

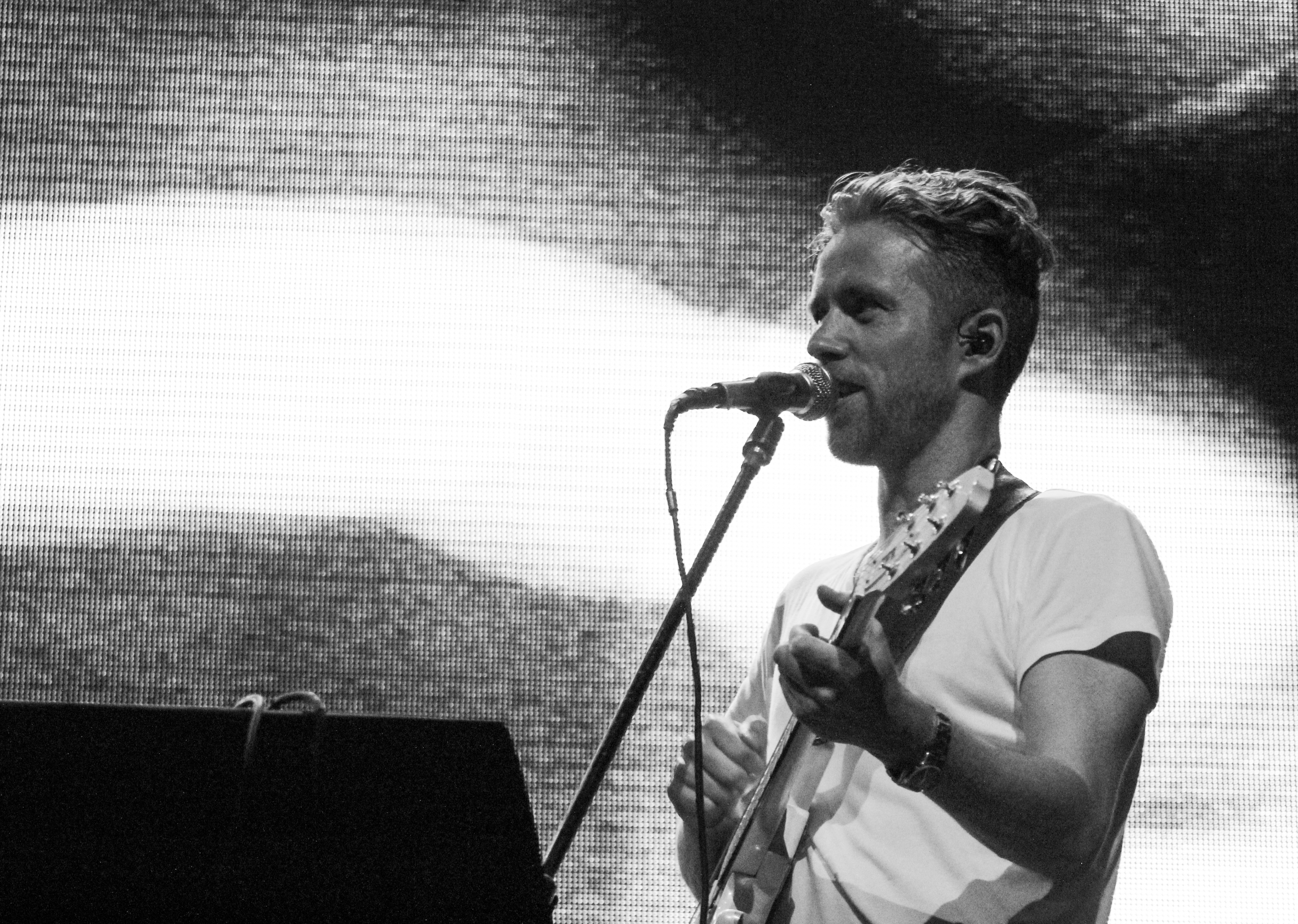
Blue Foundation lead singer Tobias Wilner captured under a concert.

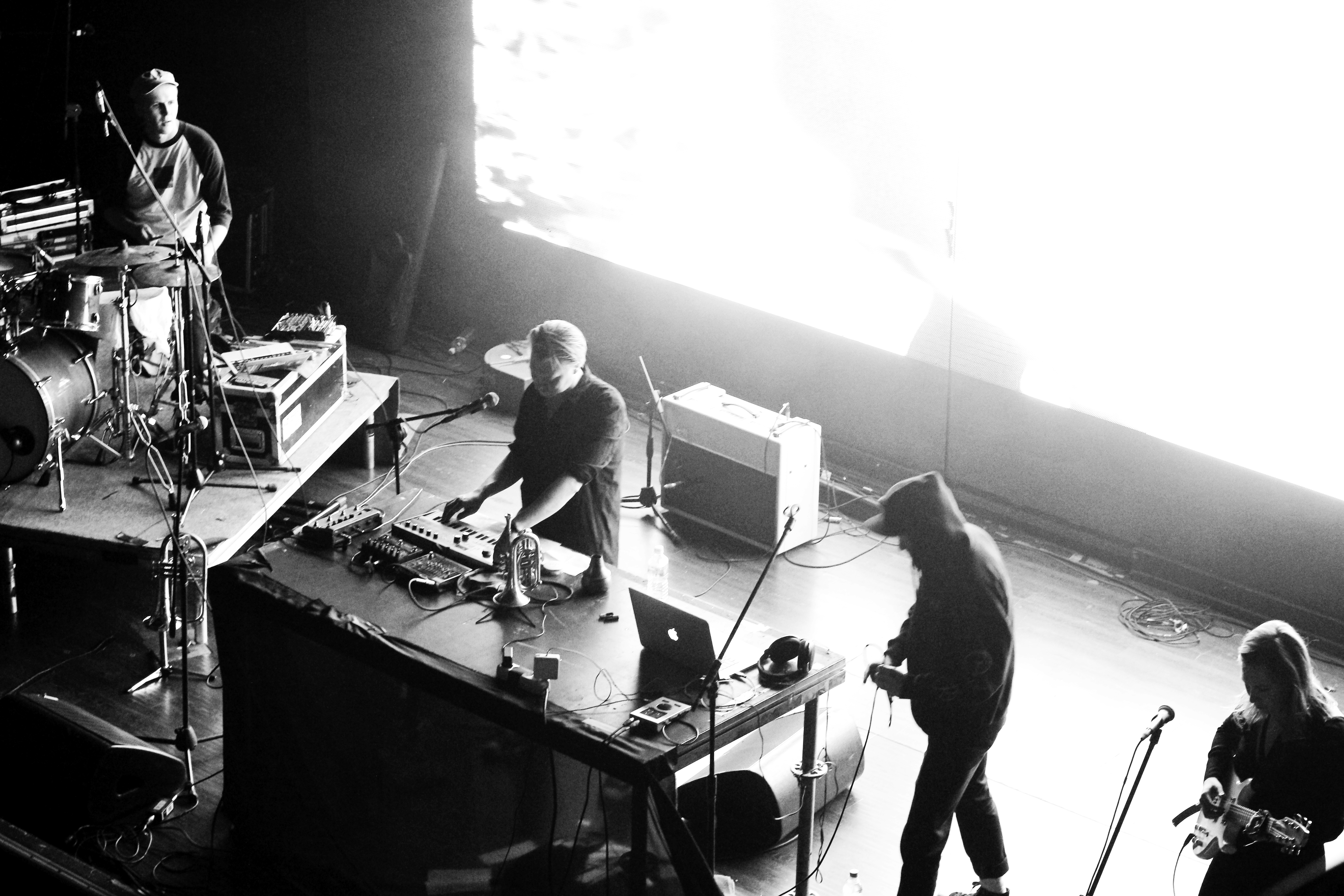
Blue Foundation live in Copenhagen 2018. Photo by Jesse Ball

On February 1, 2009 Tobias Wilner established DPC Records, mainly to release Blue Foundation, Bichi, and his band Ghost Society. Later that year, Blue Foundation went double platinum in USA for the Twilight Soundtrack. The album was certified double platinum on 16 April 2009. The Blue Foundation song Watch you Sleeping, with singer songwriter Mark Kozelek (Red House Painters, Sun Kil Moon), and former member Kirstine Stubbe Teglbjærg was released as a single on DPC.

Blue Foundation contributed with two songs for the soundtrack of the award-winning documentary film Tankograd, by director Boris Benjamin Bertram. One of the songs signals a change in female vocalists. The lead vocals are done by Sara Savery (Ghost Society and People Press Play). Blue Foundation also did the soundtrack for the short film Go All Day, featuring professional skateboarder Chaz Ortiz, Colin Kennedy. The score was later released as the Blue Foundation single Red Hook.

Tobias Wilner started the project Tachys with Mew's lead singer, Jonas Bjerre, in 2019. They released their debut album in 2023.

In 2018, Bo Rande and Tobias Wilner recorded and produced the album "Silent Dream (Instrumentals and Beats)", which was released in 2019. The album features guest appearances by Sun Glitters, Federico Ughi, and Sara Savery, also known as Drop The Gun. "Silent Dream" was produced by Tobias Wilner and Bo Rande, mixed and recorded by Tobias Wilner, and mastered by Mark Bihler at Calyx in Berlin. Blue Foundation premiered "Silent Dream" at the Radar festival in Aarhus.

In 2022, Danish singer Helena Gao performed with Blue Foundation for the first time.

Tobias Wilner announced in an interview with the Danish music magazine Gaffa, that the band is working on a new album in their Brooklyn studio. It was meant for release in 2024.

== Influences ==
When Blue Foundation started out they were influenced by bands like My Bloody Valentine, Stereolab, Broadcast, Faust, DJ Krush, Friction and Can.

== Discography ==
=== Studio albums ===
- Blue Foundation (2001)
- Sweep of Days (2004)
- Solid Origami (2006)
- Life of a Ghost (2007)
- In My Mind I Am Free (2012)
- In My Mind I Am Free / Reconstructed (2013)
- Blood Moon (2016)
- Silent Dream (2019)
- Close to the Knife (2025)

=== EP ===
- Dead People's Choice (Dead People's Choice 2007)
- Live in Zhangbei (Dead People's Choice 2015)
- It Begins (Dead People's Choice 2016)
- Live From Brooklyn (Dead People's Choice 2016)
- Eyes On Fire (Re-Work, Remix & Instrumentals) (Dead People's Choice 2016)
- Brother & Sister (Dead People's Choice 2018)

=== Singles ===
- Hollywood & Hide 7" (Moshi Moshi Records 2000)
- Hollywood & Wiseguy 12" (April Records 2000)
- As I Moved On 12" (Virgin 2003)
- End of the Day (Virgin 2004)
- This is Goodbye (Virgin 2005)
- Embers 7" (Jack To Phono Records 2005)
- Crosshair (Virgin 2006)
- Enemy (EMI 2007)
- Eyes on Fire (EMI 2009)
- Watch you Sleeping feat. Mark Kozelek / Dream (3:11 pm) (DPC Records 2009)
- Heads on Fire (DPC Records 2011)
- Red Hook (DPC Records 2011)
- Lost (DPC Records 2012)
- Eyes On Fire Re-Recorded (DPC Records 2015)
- Så Længe Jeg Lever (DPC Records 2016)
- Dreams On Fire (DPC Records 2016)
- Lost Girl feat. Jonas Bjerre (DPC Records 2016)
- Watch You Sleeping feat. Mark Kozelek (DPC Records 2016)
- Stay For Christmas (DPC Records 2018)
- Where The End Begins (KØN 2019)
- Shadow (KØN 2019)
- Shadow Shield Remix (KØN 2019)

=== Remix work ===
- Klart Der! Jorden Kalder Blue Foundation & Mixologists Remix (2000)
- Fauna Flash Mother Nature Blue Foundation Remix (Compost 2001)
- Mew Symmetry Blue Foundation Remix (Evil Office 2001)
- Zeds Dead "Eyes On Fire" Blue Foundation Remix (2007)
- Jonas Bjerre Window Pane Blue Foundation Remix (PLUK 2011)
- Ghost Society Under The Sun Blue Foundation Remix (DPC 2012)
- Apparatjik Datascroller Blue Foundation Remix (DPC 2012)
- Allies For Everyone Supernatural Blue Foundation Remix (KID Recordings 2013)
- Ninety's Remix "Bonfires" Blue Foundation Remix (Trap City 2013)
- Easy Easy Katana Blue Foundation Remix (Future Archive Recordins 2020)

=== Compilations ===
- Confusion (Compost Records 2003)
- Benetton's Colors: A Nordic Compilation (Irma Records 2003)
- Warp Factor (King Kladze Records/Time Warp 2003)
- Who Shot Jacques Laverne? (Jack To Phono Records 2004)
- We Got Monkeys: Five Years Of Moshi Moshi Records (Moshi Moshi Records 2005)
- Paris mixed by Nick Warren (Global Underground 2007)
- Sequential vol 2. mixed by Hernan Cattaneo (Renainnance 2007)
- Director's Cut: Music from the Films of Michael Mann (Rhino 2007)
- Sirenes (Spectacle Entertainment 2008)
- Michael Moshi's Moshi Mixtape (Moshi Moshi Records 2010)
- Compost Downbeat Selection, Vol. 1 (Compost 2010)
- Sound of Dubstep 3 (Ministry of Sound 2011)
- Together We Are Not Alone (THISTIME 2011)

=== Selected soundtracks ===
- Manslaughter (Zentropa/EMI) 26 August 2005
- Nordkraft (Nimbus Film) 2005
- Miami Vice (Atlantic Recording) 18 July 2006
- Twilight (Chop Shop Records/Atlantic Recording) 4 November 2008
- Normal (Bontonfilm) 26 March 2009
- Tankograd (DPC Records) 16 May 2011

=== Selected TV shows ===
- The O.C. – Season 2, Episode 7: The Family Ties, feat. Save This Town by Blue Foundation (Warner Bros. Television/Fox Network) 6 January 2005
- CSI: Miami – feat. End of the Day by Blue Foundation (CBS) 2008
- Anna Pihl – feat. Crosshair by Blue Foundation (Cosmo Film/Danish National TV) 2008
- So You Think You Can Dance – 1 episode, Top 14 Perform feat. Eyes On Fire by Blue Foundation (19 Television/20th Century Fox Television) 1 July 2009
- The Cleveland Show – feat. Eyes On Fire by Blue Foundation (20th Century Fox) 30 October 2011
- The Vampire Diaries – Season 4, Episode 8: Eyes On Fire by Blue Foundation 6 December 2012

=== Music for contemporary dance ===
- Overloadlady by Sara Gebran. Musical scores by Tobias Wilner (pre-Blue Foundation). Premiered August 1999
- Hurtdetail by Tim Feldmann. Musical scores by Tobias Wilner (Blue Foundation). Premiered at "Plovdiv Center of Contemporary Art" in Bulgaria, on 13 May 2000.
- Hendrix House by Tim Feldmann. Musical scores by Tobias Wilner (Blue Foundation) and David Linton. Premiered at Pakhus 11 April 22, 2003
- eXPLORnography by Tim Feldmann. Musical scores by Tobias Wilner (Blue Foundation). May 2005

== Members ==
Members

- Tobias Wilner – vocals, bass guitar, guitar, programming, synthesizer, percussion, production, engineering
- Bo Rande – trumpet, keyboards, synthesizer, percussion, production

Live

- Helena Gao – vocals and keyboards
- Ida Duelund – bass, double bass, and loops
- Maria Jagd – violin and loops
- Rune Lohse – drums

Former members

- Daisuke Kiyasu – vj (2003–2006)
- Anders Bertram – guitar (2000–2002)
- Tatsuki Oshima – vinyl manipulation (2003–2007)
- Scott Martingell – spoken words (2003–2008)
- Kirstine Stubbe Teglbjærg – vocals (2000–2009)
- Frederik Hantho – spoken words (2000–2002)
- Hans Landgreen – guitar, bass (2009–2010)
- Mathias Hantho – violin, banjo (2009–2010)
- Christoffer Ohlsson – cello (2003–2006)
- Sune Martin – bass (2003–2007)
- Anders Wallin – bass (2007–2008)
- Nikolaj Bundvig – drums (2006–2007)
- Emil Bernild Ferslev – drums (2000–2001)
- Lasse Herbst – drums (2007–2008)
- Federico Ughi – drums
- Sonya Kitchell – vocals, guitars
- Sara Savery – vocals
- Helena Gao – vocals

== Side projects ==
- The William Blakes
- Choir of Young Believers

== See also ==
- List of ambient music artists
