= Tòn Cónsul =

Spanish pair skater

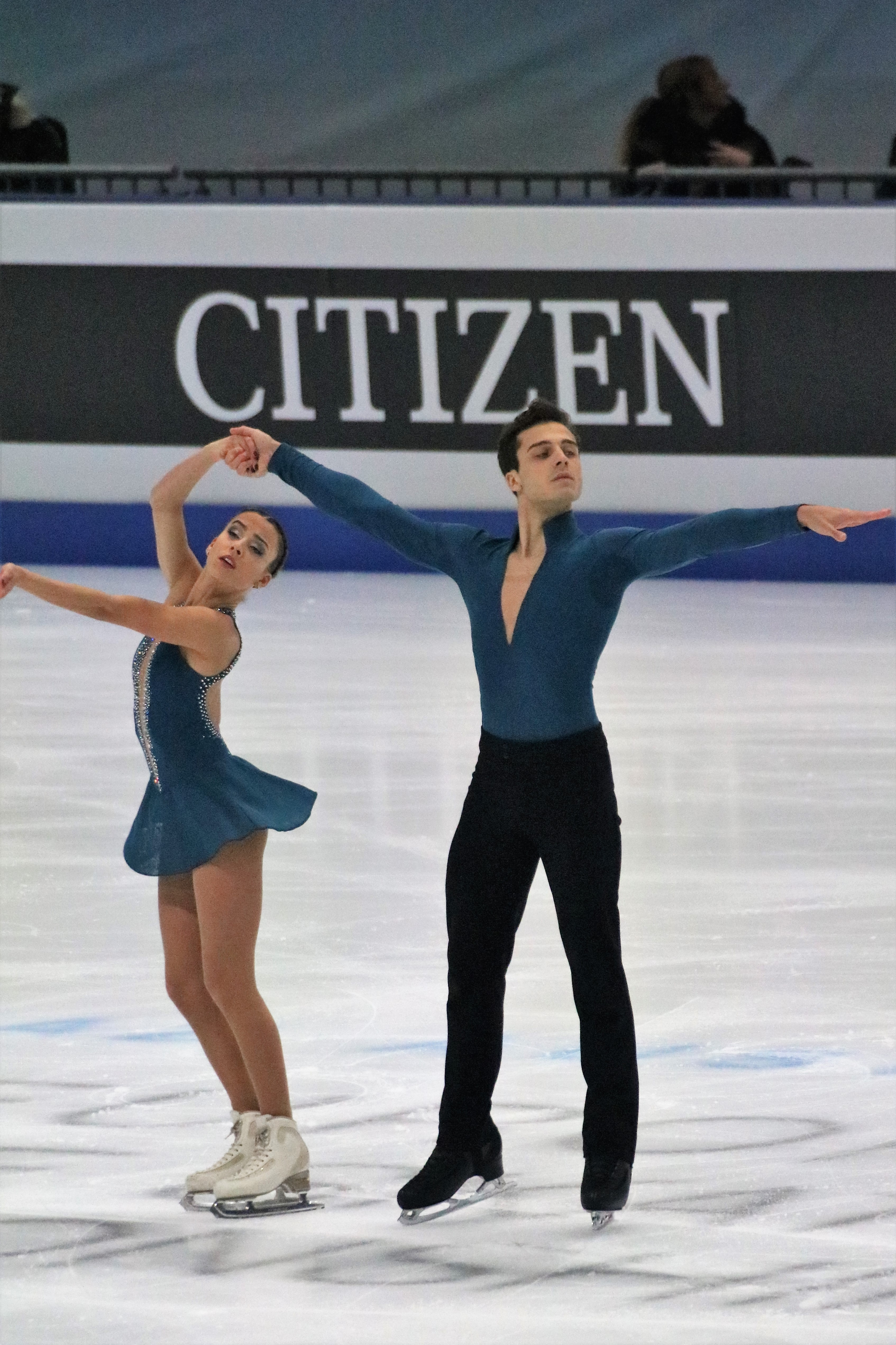
- Barquero/Cónsul at the 2020 European Championships

Personal information
- Full name: Tòn Cónsul Vivar
- Born: 1 April 1998 (age 28) Vielha, Spain
- Home town: Gausac, Spain
- Height: 1.75 m (5 ft 9 in)

Figure skating career
- Country: Spain
- Coach: Barbara Luoni; Franca Bianconi; Rosana Murante
- Skating club: FC Barcelona
- Began skating: 2006

Tòn Cónsul Vivar (born 1 April 1998) is a Spanish pair skater. With his former skating partner, Laura Barquero, he is the 2020 Spanish national champion and competed in the final segment at the 2020 European Championships.

Cónsul is the 2017 Spanish junior national champion in men's singles and in pairs with Alexanne Bouillon, as well as the 2018 Spanish junior national champion in pairs with Isabella Gamez.

== Personal life ==
Cónsul was born on 1 April 1998 in Vielha e Mijaran, Lleida, Spain. His favorite skaters are Javier Fernández and Stéphane Lambiel. Cónsul is a business administration student at Pompeu Fabra University.

== Career ==
=== Early career ===
Cónsul began skating in 2006 in Val d'Aran under his first coach Nathalie Pardos. He competed in men's singles up through the 2016–17 season, winning several international medals and the 2017 Spanish junior national title. As a singles skater, he trained in Barcelona under Patrick Capmartín and Marta Andrade.

Cónsul competed pairs with Mónica Carratalá for two seasons, beginning in the 2012–13 season. Together, they were the 2012 Open d'Andorra champions and the 2014 Spanish novice national champions. He later moved to Montreal, Canada to team up with Canadian skater Alexanne Bouillon and train with pairs coaches Bruno Marcotte, Richard Gauthier, Sylvie Fullum, and Nicholas Young. Bouillon/Cónsul won the 2017 Spanish junior national title and competed in the final segment at the 2017 World Junior Championships, finishing 16th. Cónsul began competing solely in pairs from the 2017–18 season. Competing for Spain with American skater Isabella Gamez, he is the 2018 Spanish junior national champion and the 2018 Mentor Toruń Cup champion. Gamez/Cónsul finished 13th at the 2018 World Junior Championships.

Cónsul left skating in mid-2018 and thus did not compete during the 2018–19 season.

=== 2019–2020 season ===
In July 2019, Cónsul teamed up with Laura Barquero. They trained under her coaches Barbara Luoni, Franca Bianconi, and Rosana Murante in Bergamo, Italy.

The team made their international debut in October 2019 at the Denis Ten Memorial Challenge, where they won the silver medal and earned the technical minimums for both Europeans and Worlds. They then won bronze at the IceLab International Cup. Competing on the ISU Challenger Series, Barquero/Cónsul finished fourth at the 2019 CS Warsaw Cup and eighth at the 2019 CS Golden Spin of Zagreb. In their first season together, they won the national title at the 2020 Spanish Championships, ahead of Dorota Broda / Pedro Betegón.

At the 2020 European Championships, Barquero/Cónsul were 15th in the short program and 14th in the free skating to finish 14th overall. Although they expressed disappointment with their mistakes, they were happy with their progress over the course of their short partnership. Together with teammates Broda/Betegón, Barquero/Cónsul made history for the Spanish Ice Sports Federation by marking the first time two Spanish pairs had competed at the European Championships.

In February 2020, Barquero/Cónsul finished ninth at the Challenge Cup. They were named to the 2020 World Championships team, but the competition was cancelled due to the COVID-19 pandemic. On 26 June 2020, it was announced that the pair had split after only one season together.

== Programs ==
=== With Barquero ===
Season	Short program	Free skating
2019–2020	Where's My Love by Syml choreo. by Raffaella Cazzaniga	The Journey Back In Time (from Somewhere in Time) by John Barry choreo. by Raffaella Cazzaniga

=== With Gamez ===
Season	Short program	Free skating
2017–2018	Faith by Sleeping at Last choreo. by John Kerr	María de Buenos Aires by Astor Piazzolla choreo. by Julie Marcotte

=== With Bouillon ===
Season	Short program	Free skating
2016–2017	The Man with the Golden Arm by Billy May choreo. by Julie Marcotte	Mirror Mirror by Alan Menken choreo. by Valérie Saurette

=== Men's singles ===
Season	Short program	Free skating
2016–2017	Fly Me to the Moon by Bart Howard performed by Frank Sinatra choreo. by Patrick Capmartín	A Ciegas by Miguel Poveda; Orobroy performed by Caracter Flamenco choreo. by Patrick Capmartín
2015–2016	Fly Me to the Moon by Bart Howard performed by Frank Sinatra choreo. by Patrick Capmartín	Sherlock Holmes by Hans Zimmer choreo. by Patrick Capmartín
2014–2015	Chasing Tail (from Puss in Boots (2011 film)) by Henry Jackman choreo. by Patrick Capmartín	Scheherazade by Nikolai Rimsky-Korsakov choreo. by Patrick Capmartín

== Competitive highlights ==
CS: Challenger Series; JGP: Junior Grand Prix

=== With Barquero ===
International
Event	2019–20
Worlds	C
Europeans	14th
CS Golden Spin	8th
CS Warsaw Cup	4th
Challenge Cup	9th
Denis Ten Memorial	2nd
IceLab International Cup	3rd
National
Spanish Champ.	1st
C = Cancelled

=== With Gamez ===
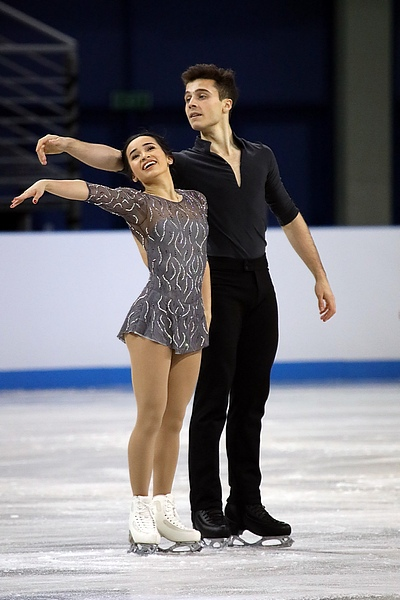
Gamez/Cónsul at the 2018 World Junior Championships

International: Junior
Event	2017–18
Junior Worlds	13th
JGP Croatia	11th
JGP Poland	13th
Toruń Cup	1st
National
Spanish Champ.	1st J
Levels: J = Junior

=== With Bouillon ===
International: Junior
Event	2016–17
Junior Worlds	16th
Bavarian Open	4th
National
Spanish Champ.	1st J
Levels: J = Junior

=== With Carratalá ===
International: Advanced novice
Event	2012–13	2013–14
Open d'Andorra	1st	
National
Spanish Champ.		1st N
Levels: N = Novice

=== Men's singles ===
International: Junior
Event	11–12	12–13	13–14	14–15	15–16	16–17
JGP Czech Rep.			13th			
JGP Estonia						19th
JGP Slovenia				15th		
JGP Spain					15th	
Challenge Cup			7th	5th		
Hellmut Seibt					6th	
Lombardia Trophy			8th		10th	
Open d'Andorra			2nd	3rd	3rd	
Printemps					4th	
Santa Claus Cup				8th		
International: Advanced novice
Dragon Trophy		1st				
Open d'Andorra		1st				
National
Spanish Champ.	5th N	1st N	3rd J	2nd J	2nd J	1st J
Levels: N = Novice; J = Junior

== Detailed results ==
Small medals for short and free programs awarded only at ISU Championships.

=== With Barquero ===
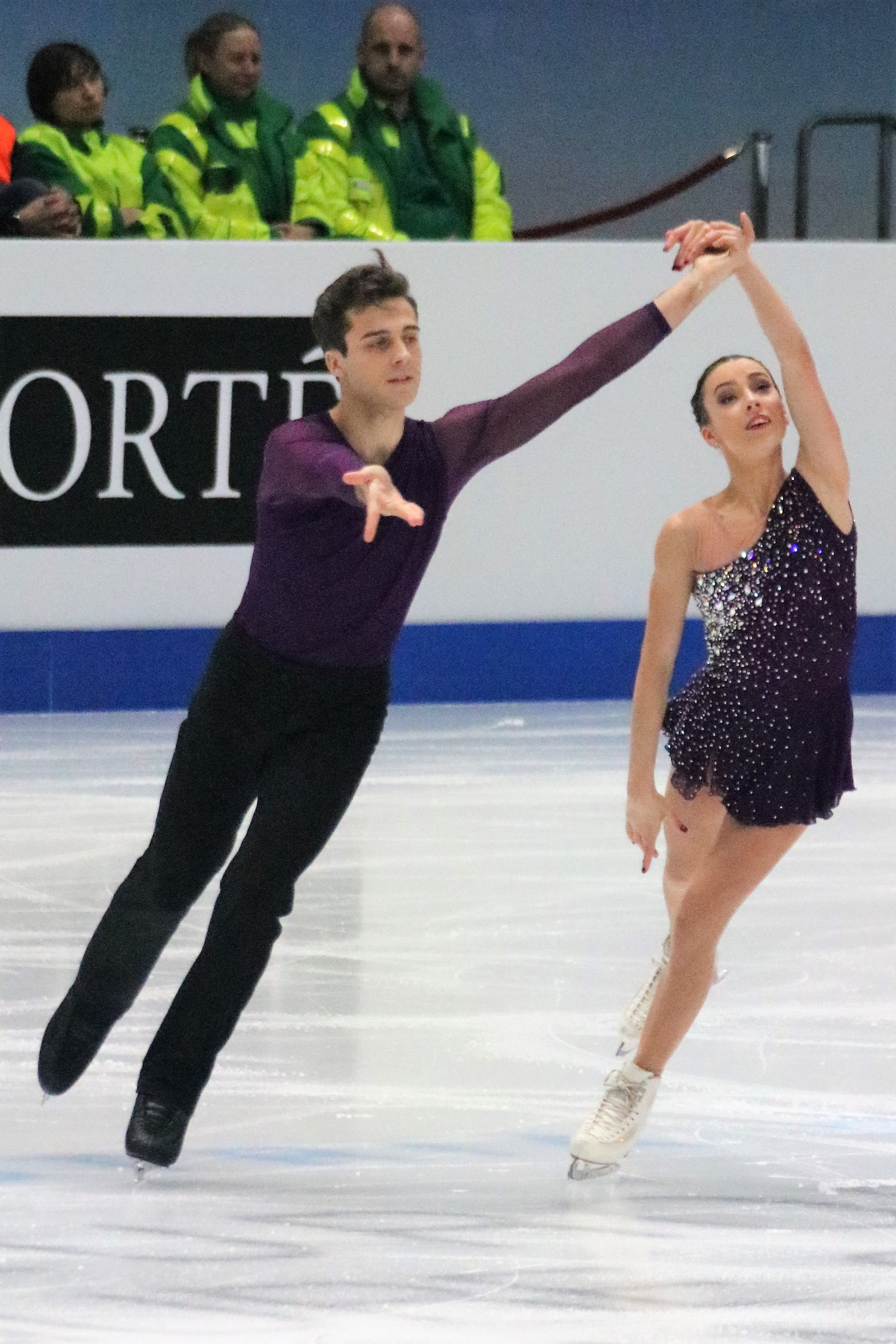
Barquero/Cónsul at the 2020 European Championships

2019–20 season
Date	Event	SP	FS	Total
20–23 February 2020	2020 Challenge Cup	10; 48.15	9; 91.92	9; 139.37
20–26 January 2020	2020 European Championships	15; 46.79	14; 88.89	14; 135.68
13–15 December 2019	2020 Spanish Championships			1; 151.35
4–7 December 2019	2019 CS Golden Spin of Zagreb	9; 52.22	8; 101.61	8; 153.83
14–17 November 2019	2019 CS Warsaw Cup	6; 54.30	4; 105.66	4; 159.96
1–3 November 2019	2019 IceLab International Cup	3; 52.18	5; 86.34	3; 138.52
10–12 October 2019	2019 Denis Ten Memorial Challenge	2; 50.83	1; 98.41	2; 149.24
