= Felipe Montoya =

Spanish figure skater

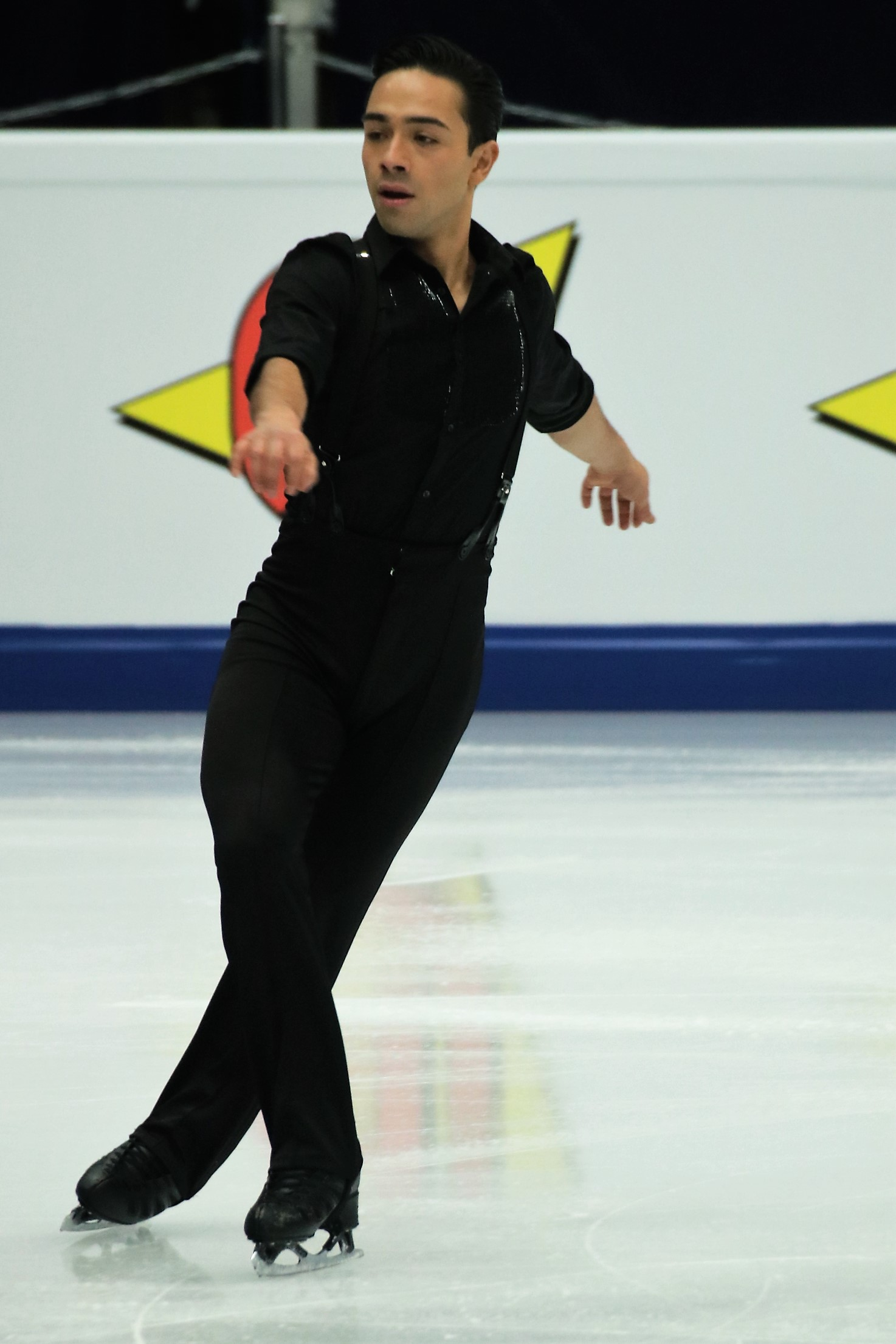
- Felipe Montoya at the 2018 European Championships

Personal information
- Full name: Felipe Montoya Pulgarín
- Born: 30 August 1990 (age 36) Pereira, Colombia
- Height: 1.68 m (5 ft 6 in)

Figure skating career
- Country: Spain
- Discipline: Men's singles
- Began skating: 2003

Medal record
Spanish Championships
Silver medal – second place	2012 Jaca	Singles
Silver medal – second place	2016 San Sebastián	Singles
Bronze medal – third place	2011 Barcelona	Singles
Bronze medal – third place	2013 Majadahonda	Singles
Bronze medal – third place	2014 Jaca	Singles
Bronze medal – third place	2015 Granada	Singles
Bronze medal – third place	2017 Vielha	Singles
Bronze medal – third place	2018 Jaca	Singles

Andrés Felipe Montoya Pulgarín (born 30 August 1990) is a Spanish competitive figure skater. He has won seven international medals and is an eight-time Spanish national medalist, having won two silver and six bronze medals. He finished within the top twenty at two European Championships (2016, 2018) and placed 29th at the 2018 Winter Olympics.

== Personal life ==
Montoya was born on 30 August 1990 in Pereira, Colombia. He moved to Spain when he was eight years old.

== Career ==
Montoya began learning to skate in 2003. He trained at Txuri-Berri Club de Hielo in San Sebastián until 2012, when he moved to SAD Majadahonda in Madrid.

In December 2015, Montoya won the silver medal at the Spanish Championships, ranking between Javier Fernández and Javier Raya. He was assigned to his first ISU Championships – the 2016 European Championships, held in January in Bratislava. He qualified to the final segment in Slovakia, placing 17th in the short program, 19th in the free skate, and 17th overall.

At the 2017 World Championships, Fernández earned two spots for Spain in the men's event at the 2018 Winter Olympics. The Federación Española Deportes de Hielo (FEDH) decided that the second spot would go to the skater who received the highest combined score at the 2017 CS Golden Spin of Zagreb and Spanish Championships. Montoya outscored Raya by 26.61 points at Golden Spin and finished third at the Spanish Championships with a 2.77 deficit versus Raya, resulting in a final advantage of 23.84 points. On 17 December 2017, FEDH confirmed that Montoya would compete at the Olympics.

In January, Montoya qualified to the final segment at the 2018 European Championships in Moscow; he ranked 22nd in the short program, 19th in the free skate, and 20th overall. In February, he competed at the 2018 Winter Olympics in PyeongChang, South Korea. He placed 29th in the short program.

== Programs ==
Season	Short program	Free skating
2015–2016	Don Quixote by Ludwig Minkus	La cumparsita by Gerardo Matos Rodríguez
2017–2018	Cold Song arranged by Rafa Alegre	La cumparsita by Gerardo Matos Rodríguez

== Competitive highlights ==
International
Event	06–07	08–09	09–10	10–11	11–12	12–13	13–14	14–15	15–16	16–17	17–18
Olympics											29th
Europeans									17th		20th
CS Golden Spin											11th
Challenge Cup							7th	9th		7th	8th
Cup of Nice								5th		18th	
Dragon Trophy						2nd					
Lombardia Trophy							6th				
NRW Trophy						18th					
Open d'Andorra								2nd	2nd		1st
Santa Claus Cup								2nd	1st	3rd	
Seibt Memorial									9th		
Sportland Trophy									4th		
Universiade							28th	21st			
National
Spanish Champ.	5th J	5th J	2nd J	3rd	2nd	3rd	3rd	3rd	2nd	3rd	3rd
