= 2018 CS Lombardia Trophy =

- Type: ISU Challenger Series
- Date: September 12 – 16
- Season: 2018–19
- Location: Bergamo, Italy
- Host: Italian Ice Sports Federation
- Venue: Ice Lab

Champions
- Men's singles: (Japan) Shoma Uno
- Ladies' singles: (Russia) Elizaveta Tuktamysheva
- Pairs: (Russia) Natalia Zabiiako / Alexander Enbert
- Ice dance: (Italy) Charlène Guignard / Marco Fabbri
- Previous: 2018 CS U.S. Classic
- Next: 2018 CS Ondrej Nepela Trophy

The 2018 CS Lombardia Trophy was held in September 2018 in Bergamo, Italy. It was part of the 2018–19 ISU Challenger Series. Medals were awarded in the disciplines of men's singles, ladies' singles, pair skating, and ice dancing.

== Entries ==
The International Skating Union published the list of entries on August 13, 2018.

| Country | Men | Ladies | Pairs | Ice dance |
|---|---|---|---|---|
| Croatia | | | Lana Petranović / Antonio Souza-Kordeiru | |
| Czech Republic | Jiří Bělohradský; Petr Kotlařík | Michaela Lucie Hanzlíková; Klara Stepanova | | |
| Estonia | | Eva Lotta Kiibus | | Katerina Bunina / German Frolov |
| Finland | | Viveca Lindfors; Sofia Sula | | Juulia Turkkila / Matthias Versluis |
| France | Luc Economides; Adrien Tesson; Philip Warren | Sandra Ramond; Léa Serna | Coline Keriven / Antoine Pierre | Julia Wagret / Pierre Souquet |
| Germany | | Nathalie Weinzierl | | |
| Hungary | | Ivett Tóth | | Hanna Jakucs / Alessio Galli |
| Italy | Matteo Rizzo | Sara Conti; Micol Cristini; Chenny Paolucci | Nicole Della Monica / Matteo Guarise; Rebecca Ghilardi / Filippo Ambrosini | Chiara Calderone / Pietro Papetti; Charlène Guignard / Marco Fabbri; Carolina Moscheni / Andrea Fabbri; Jasmine Tessari / Francesco Fioretti |
| Japan | Kazuki Tomono; Shoma Uno | Kaori Sakamoto; Mako Yamashita | | |
| Kazakhstan | | Veronika Sheveleva | | |
| Lithuania | | Elžbieta Kropa; Greta Morkytė | | |
| Philippines | | Alisson Krystle Perticheto | | |
| Poland | Igor Reznichenko | | | |
| Russia | Dmitri Aliev; Andrei Lazukin | Sofia Samodurova; Elizaveta Tuktamysheva | Aleksandra Boikova / Dmitrii Kozlovskii; Natalia Zabiiako / Alexander Enbert | |
| Serbia | | Antonina Dubinina | | |
| South Africa | Matthew Samuels | | | |
| South Korea | Kyeong Jae-seok; Lee June-hyoung | Kim Bo-young | | |
| Spain | | Valentina Matos | Laura Barquero / Aritz Maestu | Sara Hurtado / Kirill Khaliavin |
| Switzerland | | | | Victoria Manni / Carlo Roethlisberger |
| United Kingdom | | | | Robynne Tweedale / Joseph Buckland |
| United States | Timothy Dolensky | Amber Glenn | Nica Digerness / Danny Neudecker | Rachel Parsons / Michael Parsons |

=== Changes to preliminary assignments ===
| Date | Discipline | Withdrew | Added | Reason/Other notes | Refs |
|---|---|---|---|---|---|
| August 21 | Men | (United Kingdom) Harry Mattick | (Russia) Andrei Lazukin | | |
| August 21 | Ladies | (Estonia) Kristina Shkuleta-Gromova | (Russia) Sofia Samodurova | | |
| August 21 | Ladies | (Hungary) Fruzsina Medgyesi | (Russia) Elizaveta Tuktamysheva | | |
| September 6 | Ladies | (Sweden) Anita Östlund | N/A | | |
| September 6 | Ice dance | N/A | (Hungary) Hanna Jakucs / Alessio Galli | | |
| September 7 | Men | (Estonia) Daniel Albert Naurits | N/A | | |
| September 7 | Ladies | (United Arab Emirates) Zahra Lari | N/A | | |

== Results ==
=== Men ===
| Rank | Name | Nation | Total | SP | | FS | |
|---|---|---|---|---|---|---|---|
| 1 | Shoma Uno | Japan | 276.20 | 1 | 104.15 | 1 | 172.05 |
| 2 | Dmitri Aliev | Russia | 250.55 | 3 | 86.57 | 2 | 163.98 |
| 3 | Andrei Lazukin | Russia | 243.45 | 2 | 87.92 | 3 | 155.53 |
| 4 | Matteo Rizzo | Italy | 227.97 | 4 | 85.51 | 4 | 142.46 |
| 5 | Kazuki Tomono | Japan | 216.74 | 5 | 75.47 | 5 | 141.27 |
| 6 | Timothy Dolensky | United States | 197.37 | 6 | 71.06 | 6 | 126.31 |
| 7 | Petr Kotlařík | Czech Republic | 184.55 | 10 | 62.57 | 8 | 121.98 |
| 8 | Luc Economides | France | 183.55 | 7 | 68.60 | 10 | 114.95 |
| 9 | Kyeong Jae-seok | South Korea | 181.77 | 12 | 56.49 | 7 | 125.28 |
| 10 | Adrien Tesson | France | 178.49 | 11 | 57.27 | 9 | 121.22 |
| 11 | Lee June-hyoung | South Korea | 176.53 | 8 | 68.54 | 12 | 107.99 |
| 12 | Jiří Bělohradský | Czech Republic | 171.99 | 9 | 64.15 | 13 | 107.84 |
| 13 | Igor Reznichenko | Poland | 160.51 | 13 | 48.09 | 11 | 112.42 |
| 14 | Philip Warren | France | 152.85 | 14 | 47.68 | 14 | 105.17 |
| 15 | Matthew Samuels | South Africa | 118.20 | 15 | 46.07 | 15 | 72.13 |

=== Ladies ===
| Rank | Name | Nation | Total | SP | | FS | |
|---|---|---|---|---|---|---|---|
| 1 | Elizaveta Tuktamysheva | Russia | 206.07 | 1 | 65.69 | 1 | 140.38 |
| 2 | Sofia Samodurova | Russia | 184.82 | 2 | 64.09 | 4 | 120.77 |
| 3 | Mako Yamashita | Japan | 182.22 | 5 | 55.33 | 3 | 126.89 |
| 4 | Kaori Sakamoto | Japan | 180.85 | 9 | 49.91 | 2 | 130.94 |
| 5 | Viveca Lindfors | Finland | 166.93 | 3 | 62.68 | 6 | 104.25 |
| 6 | Amber Glenn | United States | 166.25 | 4 | 58.57 | 5 | 107.68 |
| 7 | Ivett Tóth | Hungary | 153.35 | 6 | 55.21 | 8 | 98.14 |
| 8 | Micol Cristini | Italy | 148.78 | 10 | 49.75 | 7 | 99.03 |
| 9 | Nathalie Weinzierl | Germany | 138.66 | 8 | 53.61 | 11 | 85.05 |
| 10 | Klara Stepanova | Czech Republic | 134.97 | 13 | 46.64 | 10 | 88.33 |
| 11 | Kim Bo-young | South Korea | 132.31 | 17 | 43.72 | 9 | 88.59 |
| 12 | Léa Serna | France | 130.86 | 7 | 54.07 | 16 | 76.79 |
| 13 | Sofia Sula | Finland | 130.57 | 15 | 46.26 | 12 | 84.31 |
| 14 | Eva Lotta Kiibus | Estonia | 130.09 | 11 | 48.43 | 13 | 81.66 |
| 15 | Elžbieta Kropa | Lithuania | 127.04 | 12 | 47.62 | 14 | 79.42 |
| 16 | Antonina Dubinina | Serbia | 121.77 | 16 | 44.40 | 15 | 77.37 |
| 17 | Chenny Paolucci | Italy | 116.24 | 14 | 46.61 | 18 | 69.63 |
| 18 | Sara Conti | Italy | 112.12 | 22 | 36.43 | 17 | 75.69 |
| 19 | Greta Morkytė | Lithuania | 105.34 | 20 | 39.79 | 19 | 65.55 |
| 20 | Valentina Matos | Spain | 101.97 | 18 | 42.72 | 22 | 59.25 |
| 21 | Michaela Lucie Hanzlíková | Czech Republic | 101.28 | 19 | 40.23 | 20 | 61.05 |
| 22 | Veronika Sheveleva | Kazakhstan | 96.44 | 23 | 35.40 | 21 | 61.04 |
| WD | Alisson Krystle Perticheto | Philippines | withdrew | 21 | 36.62 | withdrew from competition | |
| WD | Sandra Ramond | France | withdrew | withdrew from competition | | | |

=== Pairs ===
| Rank | Name | Nation | Total | SP | | FS | |
|---|---|---|---|---|---|---|---|
| 1 | Natalia Zabiiako / Alexander Enbert | Russia | 196.15 | 1 | 72.50 | 2 | 123.65 |
| 2 | Aleksandra Boikova / Dmitrii Kozlovskii | Russia | 191.99 | 3 | 65.21 | 1 | 126.78 |
| 3 | Nicole Della Monica / Matteo Guarise | Italy | 178.18 | 2 | 66.93 | 3 | 111.25 |
| 4 | Nica Digerness / Danny Neudecker | United States | 150.83 | 4 | 53.90 | 5 | 96.93 |
| 5 | Laura Barquero / Aritz Maestu | Spain | 145.07 | 6 | 45.94 | 4 | 99.13 |
| 6 | Rebecca Ghilardi / Filippo Ambrosini | Italy | 143.21 | 5 | 48.48 | 6 | 94.73 |
| 7 | Lana Petranović / Antonio Souza-Kordeiru | Croatia | 105.91 | 7 | 40.94 | 7 | 64.97 |
| WD | Coline Keriven / Antoine Pierre | France | withdrew | withdrew from competition | | | |

=== Ice dancing ===
| Rank | Name | Nation | Total | SD | | FD | |
|---|---|---|---|---|---|---|---|
| 1 | Charlène Guignard / Marco Fabbri | Italy | 193.28 | 1 | 76.03 | 1 | 117.25 |
| 2 | Rachel Parsons / Michael Parsons | United States | 170.68 | 2 | 68.20 | 3 | 102.48 |
| 3 | Sara Hurtado / Kirill Khaliavin | Spain | 169.47 | 3 | 65.03 | 2 | 104.44 |
| 4 | Jasmine Tessari / Francesco Fioretti | Italy | 147.70 | 4 | 58.08 | 4 | 89.62 |
| 5 | Robynne Tweedale / Joseph Buckland | United Kingdom | 146.00 | 6 | 57.16 | 5 | 88.84 |
| 6 | Juulia Turkkila / Matthias Versluis | Finland | 144.44 | 5 | 57.92 | 6 | 86.52 |
| 7 | Carolina Moscheni / Andrea Fabbri | Italy | 139.79 | 8 | 54.30 | 7 | 85.49 |
| 8 | Julia Wagret / Pierre Souquet | France | 135.59 | 7 | 54.39 | 8 | 81.20 |
| 9 | Chiara Calderone / Pietro Papetti | Italy | 129.42 | 10 | 49.10 | 9 | 80.32 |
| 10 | Victoria Manni / Carlo Roethlisberger | Switzerland | 123.72 | 9 | 49.42 | 10 | 74.37 |
| 11 | Katerina Bunina / German Frolov | Estonia | 106.28 | 11 | 41.97 | 11 | 64.31 |
| 12 | Hanna Jakucs / Alessio Galli | Hungary | 103.67 | 12 | 39.93 | 12 | 63.74 |
