= 2018 NHK Trophy =

Figure skating competition

- Type: Grand Prix
- Date: November 9 – 11
- Season: 2018–19
- Location: Hiroshima
- Venue: Hiroshima Green Arena

Champions
- Men's singles: (Japan) Shoma Uno
- Ladies' singles: (Japan) Rika Kihira
- Pairs: (Russia) Natalia Zabiiako / Alexander Enbert
- Ice dance: (United States) Kaitlin Hawayek / Jean-Luc Baker
- Previous: 2017 NHK Trophy
- Next: 2019 NHK Trophy
- Previous Grand Prix: 2018 Grand Prix of Helsinki
- Next Grand Prix: 2018 Rostelecom Cup

The 2018 NHK Trophy was the fourth event of six in the 2018–19 ISU Grand Prix of Figure Skating, a senior-level international invitational competition series. It was held at Hiroshima Green Arena in Hiroshima on November 9–11. Medals were awarded in the disciplines of men's singles, ladies' singles, pair skating, and ice dancing. Skaters also earned points toward qualifying for the 2018–19 Grand Prix Final.

== Entries ==
The ISU published the preliminary assignments on June 29, 2018.

Country	Men	Ladies	Pairs	Ice dancing
Australia		Kailani Craine		
Canada	Kevin Reynolds		Kirsten Moore-Towers / Michael Marinaro	Carolane Soucisse / Shane Firus
China			Peng Cheng / Jin Yang	Wang Shiyue / Liu Xinyu
France		Maé-Bérénice Méité		
Italy	Matteo Rizzo			
Japan	Hiroaki Sato; Shoma Uno; Sōta Yamamoto	Rika Kihira; Mai Mihara; Satoko Miyahara	Miu Suzaki / Ryuichi Kihara	Misato Komatsubara / Tim Koleto
Latvia	Deniss Vasiļjevs			
Russia	Dmitri Aliev; Sergei Voronov	Alena Leonova; Maria Sotskova; Elizaveta Tuktamysheva	Natalia Zabiiako / Alexander Enbert	Anastasia Skoptcova / Kirill Aleshin; Tiffany Zahorski / Jonathan Guerreiro
South Korea	Lee June-hyoung	Lim Eun-soo		
Spain			Laura Barquero / Aritz Maestu	
Ukraine	Yaroslav Paniot			Alexandra Nazarova / Maxim Nikitin
United Kingdom				Lilah Fear / Lewis Gibson
United States	Alexander Johnson; Vincent Zhou	Mariah Bell; Courtney Hicks; Angela Wang	Tarah Kayne / Danny O'Shea; Audrey Lu / Misha Mitrofanov; Alexa Scimeca Knierim / Chris Knierim	Kaitlin Hawayek / Jean-Luc Baker; Rachel Parsons / Michael Parsons

=== Changes to preliminary assignments ===
Date	Discipline	Withdrew	Added	Reason/Other notes	Refs
July 30 and August 6	Pairs	(China) Sui Wenjing / Han Cong	(United States) Audrey Lu / Misha Mitrofanov	Injury recovery (Sui)	
August 9 and 31	Ice dance	(Japan) Kana Muramoto / Chris Reed	(United Kingdom) Lilah Fear / Lewis Gibson	Split	
September 3	Men	N/A	(Japan) Sōta Yamamoto	Host pick	
September 3	Ladies	N/A	(Japan) Rika Kihira	Host pick	
October 8 and 11	Ladies	(China) Li Xiangning	(France) Maé-Bérénice Méité		
October 12 and 17	Ladies	(South Korea) Choi Da-bin	(South Korea) Lim Eun-soo		
October 26 and 29	Ladies	(Russia) Elena Radionova	(Russia) Alena Leonova	Back injury	
October 29 and 30	Ladies	(Canada) Gabrielle Daleman	(Australia) Kailani Craine	Focus on mental health	
November 1	Pairs	(Germany) Annika Hocke / Ruben Blommaert	(Spain) Laura Barquero / Aritz Maestu		
November 6	Ice dance	(France) Gabriella Papadakis / Guillaume Cizeron	N/A	Back injury (Cizeron)	

== Results ==
=== Men ===
Rank	Name	Nation	Total points	SP		FS	
1	Shoma Uno	Japan	276.45	1	92.49	1	183.96
2	Sergei Voronov	Russia	254.28	2	91.37	2	162.91
3	Matteo Rizzo	Italy	224.71	4	77.00	3	147.71
4	Vincent Zhou	United States	223.42	5	75.90	4	147.52
5	Dmitri Aliev	Russia	219.52	3	81.16	6	138.36
6	Sōta Yamamoto	Japan	213,40	6	74.98	5	138.42
7	Alexander Johnson	United States	199.75	8	72.03	7	127.72
8	Deniss Vasiļjevs	Latvia	197.60	7	72.39	8	125.21
9	Lee June-hyoung	South Korea	188.26	11	66.16	9	122.10
10	Hiroaki Sato	Japan	185.18	10	67.38	11	117.80
11	Kevin Reynolds	Canada	182.67	12	61.14	10	121.53
12	Yaroslav Paniot	Ukraine	173.64	9	68.59	12	105.05

=== Ladies ===
Rank	Name	Nation	Total points	SP		FS	
1	Rika Kihira	Japan	224.31	5	69.59	1	154.72
2	Satoko Miyahara	Japan	219.47	2	76.08	2	143.39
3	Elizaveta Tuktamysheva	Russia	219.02	1	76.17	3	142.85
4	Mai Mihara	Japan	204.20	3	70.38	5	133.82
5	Mariah Bell	United States	198.96	7	62.97	4	135.99
6	Lim Eun-soo	South Korea	196.31	4	69.78	6	126.53
7	Alena Leonova	Russia	194.15	6	68.22	7	125.93
8	Courtney Hicks	United States	178.07	10	59.10	8	118.97
9	Maria Sotskova	Russia	176.99	9	60.75	9	116.24
10	Mae Berenice Meite	France	162.58	12	50.49	10	112.09
11	Angela Wang	United States	159.36	8	60.82	11	98.54
12	Kailani Craine	Australia	154.22	11	58.21	12	96.01

=== Pairs ===
Rank	Name	Nation	Total points	SP		FS	
1	Natalia Zabiiako / Alexander Enbert	Russia	214.14	1	73.48	1	140.66
2	Peng Cheng / Jin Yang	China	207.24	2	70.66	2	136.58
3	Alexa Scimeca Knierim / Chris Knierim	United States	190.49	4	64.75	3	125.74
4	Kirsten Moore-Towers / Michael Marinaro	Canada	189.66	3	67.70	4	121.96
5	Tarah Kayne / Danny O'Shea	United States	164.16	5	59.00	5	105.16
6	Laura Barquero / Aritz Maestu	Spain	159.59	6	55.37	6	104.22
7	Audrey Lu / Misha Mitrofanov	United States	149.25	7	52.35	7	96.90
8	Miu Suzaki / Ryuichi Kihara	Japan	143.69	8	49.93	8	93.76

=== Ice dancing ===
Rank	Name	Nation	Total points	RD		FD	
1	Kaitlin Hawayek / Jean-Luc Baker	United States	184.63	2	70.71	1	113.92
2	Tiffany Zahorski / Jonathan Guerreiro	Russia	183.05	1	75.49	4	107.56
3	Rachel Parsons / Michael Parsons	United States	178.64	3	69.07	3	109.57
4	Lilah Fear / Lewis Gibson	United Kingdom	177.20	7	63.91	2	113.29
5	Carolane Soucisse / Shane Firus	Canada	169.84	5	66.01	5	103.83
6	Wang Shiyue / Liu Xinyu	China	167.96	4	66.27	6	101.69
7	Anastasia Skoptcova / Kirill Aleshin	Russia	159.96	6	64.53	7	95.43
8	Misato Komatsubara / Tim Koleto	Japan	154.27	9	59.40	8	94.87
9	Alexandra Nazarova / Maxim Nikitin	Ukraine	153.22	8	60.20	9	93.02
