= Yon García =

Spanish figure skater

Yon Garcia
Personal information
- Born: 2 July 1979 (age 47) San Sebastián, Spain
- Height: 1.73 m (5 ft 8 in)

Figure skating career
- Country: Spain
- Discipline: Men's singles
- Began skating: 1991
- Retired: 2005

Medal record
Spanish Championships
Gold medal – first place	1999	Singles
Gold medal – first place	2001 San Sebastián	Singles
Gold medal – first place	2002 Barcelona	Singles
Gold medal – first place	2003 Jaca	Singles
Gold medal – first place	2004 Madrid	Singles
Silver medal – second place	1998	Singles
Silver medal – second place	2000	Singles
Silver medal – second place	2005	Singles

Yon Garcia (born 2 July 1979) is a Spanish former competitive figure skater. He is a five-time Spanish national champion.

== Programs ==
Season	Short program	Free skating
2004–2005	Chicago (musical) by John Kander	City Lights by Charlie Chaplin
2003–2004	Capriccio Espagnol by Nikolai Rimsky-Korsakov	City Lights by Charlie Chaplin
2002–2003	Capriccio Espagnol by Nikolai Rimsky-Korsakov	Circus medley Prague Philharmonic Orchestra
2001–2002	Sing, Sing, Sing	Circus medley Prague Philharmonic Orchestra
2000–2001	Sing, Sing, Sing	Romeo and Juliet by Sergei Prokofiev; Romeo and Juliet by Pyotr I. Tchaikovsky Bratislava Philharmonic Orchestra

== Results ==
Results
International
Event	1993–94	1994–95	1995–96	1996–97	1997–98	1998–99	1999–00	2000–01	2001–02	2002–03	2003–04	2004–05
Worlds						37th		39th	31st	33rd	37th	37th
Europeans							33rd				27th	
Copenhagen											2nd	
Golden Spin									17th		20th	14th
Karl Schäfer											13th	13th
Nebelhorn								20th				
Triglav Trophy										3rd		
International: Junior
Junior Worlds						32nd						
JGP France						5th						
JGP Mexico						7th						
EYOF				10th J.								
National
Spanish Champ.	1st J.	2nd J.	2nd J.	4th	2nd	1st	2nd	1st	1st	1st	1st	2nd
