= Marta García (skater) =

Spanish figure skater (born 1993)

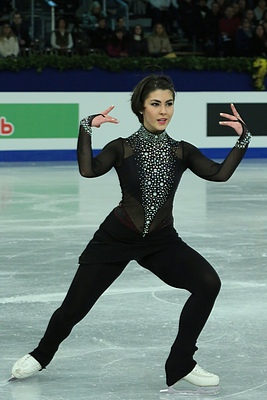
- Marta García at the 2014 European Championships

Personal information
- Full name: Marta Maria García Orge
- Born: 13 November 1993 (age 32) Seville, Spain
- Height: 1.58 m (5 ft 2 in)

Figure skating career
- Country: Spain
- Discipline: Women's singles
- Began skating: 2002

Medal record
Spanish Championships
Silver medal – second place	2014 Jaca	Singles
Silver medal – second place	2015 Granada	Singles
Silver medal – second place	2016 San Sebastián	Singles

Marta Maria García Orge (born 13 November 1993) is a Spanish figure skater. After winning the silver medal at the 2014 Spanish Championships, she was assigned to the 2014 European Championships where she qualified for the free skate. García has one senior international medal, bronze from the 2014 Toruń Cup.

== Programs ==
Season	Short program	Free skating
2013–14	Tango by unknown	Boléro by Maurice Ravel
2012–13	Blues for Klook by Eddy Louiss	Bram Stoker's Dracula by Wojciech Kilar
2011–12	Carmen by Georges Bizet	Sheherazade by Nikolai Rimsky-Korsakov
2009–10	The Feeling Begins (from The Last Temptation of Christ) by Peter Gabriel	Cavalleria Rusticana
2008–09	Harlem Nocturne by Earle Hagen	Schindler's List by John Williams, Itzhak Perlman

== Competitive highlights ==
International
Event	08–09	09–10	10–11	11–12	12–13	13–14	14–15	15–16	16–17
Europeans						22nd			
Challenge Cup						6th	7th		
Cup of Nice									24th
Golden Spin						12th			
Open d'Andorra								4th	
Santa Claus Cup							6th	13th	
Toruń Cup						3rd			
International: Junior
Junior Worlds					40th				
JGP Croatia		21st							
JGP France					WD				
JGP Germany		14th							
JGP Romania				19th					
JGP Spain	22nd								
Cup of Nice					12th J				
Challenge Cup				8th J					
EYOF	11th J								
Mont Blanc			11th J						
Triglav Trophy				5th J					
Merano Cup									
National
Spanish Champ.	2nd J		2nd J	2nd J	1st J	2nd	2nd	2nd	
