= Laura Barquero =

Spanish pair skater

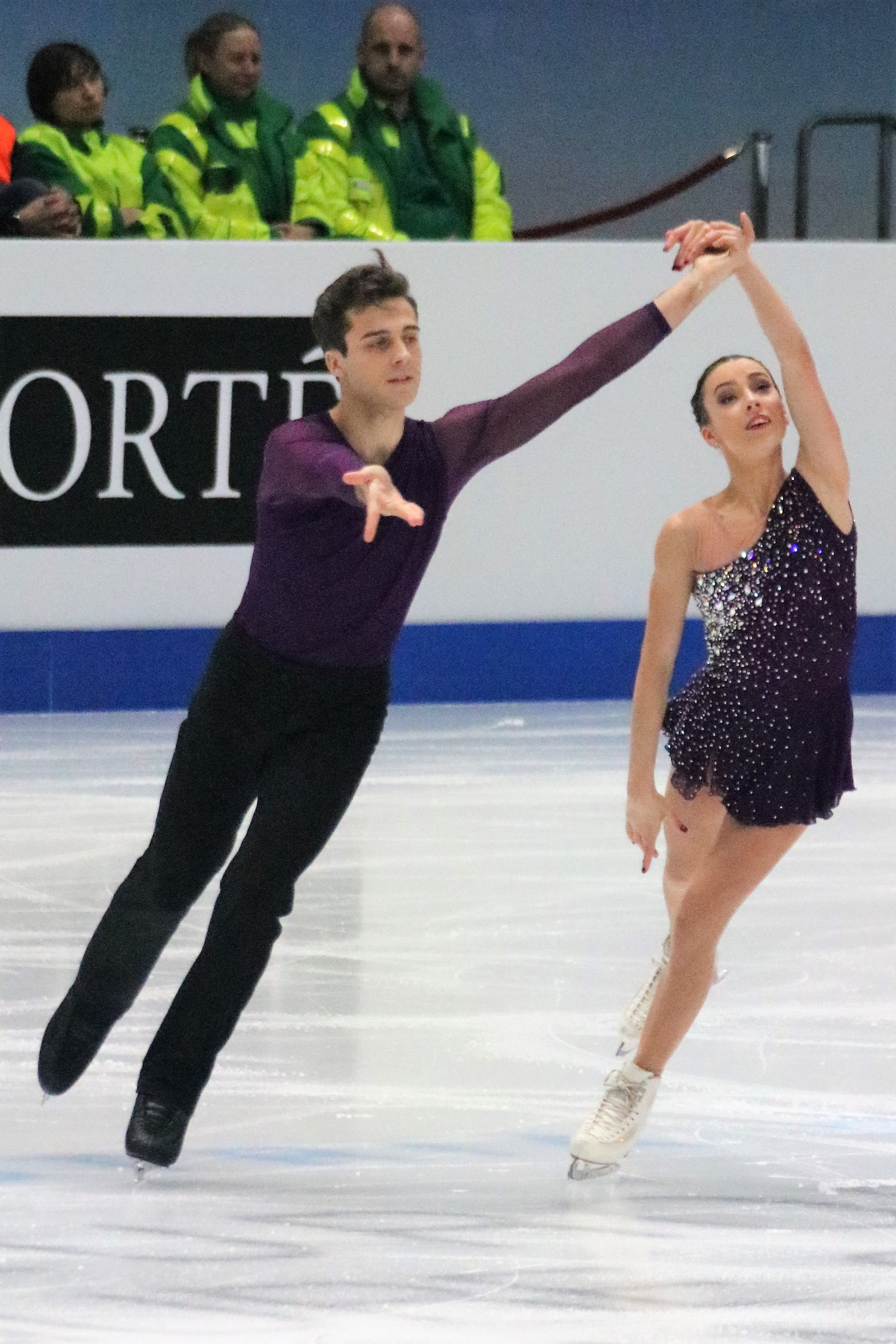
- Barquero/Cónsul at the 2020 European Championships

Personal information
- Full name: Laura Barquero Jiménez
- Born: 12 October 2001 (age 25) Madrid, Spain
- Height: 1.58 m (5 ft 2 in)

Figure skating career
- Country: Spain
- Coach: Barbara Luoni; Franca Bianconi; Rosana Murante
- Skating club: Sport Hielo Madrid
- Began skating: 2009

Laura Barquero Jiménez (born 12 October 2001) is a Spanish pair skater. With her former skating partner, Marco Zandron, she is the 2021 Nebelhorn Trophy silver medalist and the 2021 Spanish national champion.

With her former skating partner, Tòn Cónsul, she is the 2020 Spanish national champion and competed in the final segment at the 2020 European Championships. With her former skating partner, Aritz Maestu, she is the 2018 Toruń Cup champion and 2018 International Challenge Cup champion and competed for Spain at two World Championships.

== Career ==
=== Early years ===
Barquero began learning to skate in 2009. As a single skater, she trained under Marta Senra and Ainhoa Gimeno in Madrid, Spain. She competed on the junior level. She received one ISU Junior Grand Prix assignment in September 2016.

Barquero's first pair skating partner was Miguel Taranco. They made no international appearances together.

=== 2016–2017 season ===
Barquero and Aritz Maestu announced their partnership on 4 January 2017. They decided to train in Bergamo, Italy, coached by Barbara Luoni and Franca Bianconi. During their first season together, the pair was ineligible for international competitions due to the ISU's age requirements – Barquero was too young for senior events and Maestu too old for juniors.

=== 2017–2018 season ===
Making their international debut, Barquero/Maestu placed seventh at the 2017 CS Lombardia Trophy in mid-September. At the end of the month, they placed thirteenth at the 2017 CS Nebelhorn Trophy, the final qualifying opportunity for the 2018 Winter Olympics. Although their placement was not sufficient to qualify, Spain became the third alternate for a spot in the Olympic pairs' event.

In January, Barquero/Maestu placed eleventh at the 2018 European Championships in Moscow, Russia. The following month, they won gold at the Toruń Cup in Toruń, Poland, and at the International Challenge Cup in The Hague, Netherlands. They concluded the season at the 2018 World Championships, in twentieth place.

=== 2018–2019 season ===
Barquero/Maestu began the season with two Challenger assignments, finishing fifth at the 2018 CS Lombardia Trophy and eighth at the 2018 CS Finlandia Trophy. Making their Grand Prix debut with two assignments, they were seventh at the 2018 Grand Prix of Helsinki and sixth at 2018 NHK Trophy. They were seventh at the 2019 European Championships after taking their second consecutive national title. Their final event together was the 2019 World Championships, where they placed fifteenth.

On 31 May 2019 it was announced that Maestu had suffered an injury that would involve a prolonged recovery, and as a consequence of this, the team split.

=== 2019–2020 season ===
In July 2019, Barquero teamed up with Tòn Cónsul.

The team made their international debut at the Denis Ten Memorial Challenge, where they won the silver medal. They continued their season at the IceLab International Cup, where they won bronze. They were fourth at the 2019 CS Warsaw Cup. Their last competition before Nationals was the 2019 CS Golden Spin of Zagreb, where they were eighth. At their first Spanish Nationals, they won their first National title.

They competed at the 2020 European Championships, where they placed fourteenth. They went on to compete at the International Challenge Cup, where they placed ninth. They were named to the team for the 2020 Worlds, but the competition was cancelled due to the COVID-19 pandemic.

On 26 June 2020, it was announced that the pair had split after only one season together.

=== 2020–2021 season ===
Barquero formed a new partnership with Italian pairs skater Marco Zandron, and in January 2021, they were formally cleared to represent Spain. They won the Spanish national title in their first outing together but did not compete internationally during the season.

=== 2021–2022 season ===
Barquero/Zandron made their international debut on the Challenger series at the 2021 Lombardia Trophy. They were second in the short program and won the free skate, taking the silver medal overall and finishing less than four points behind Italian national champions Della Monica/Guarise. They were next assigned to the 2021 CS Nebelhorn Trophy, where they attempted to qualify a berth for Spain at the 2022 Winter Olympics. Third in the short program, they won the free skate despite two jump errors. They took the silver medal overall and the first of three pairs berths available at the event. This was the first time a Spanish pair qualified for the Winter Olympics. Barquero said she was "proud" of their work, while Zandron said he was confident that he would acquire Spanish citizenship in time to attend the Games. At their second Challenger, the 2021 CS Finlandia Trophy, they placed sixth with new personal bests in both segments and overall.

Zandron obtained his Spanish citizenship on 29 December 2021, making the team eligible to represent Spain at the Winter Olympics. In the new year, they competed together at their first European Championships, finishing in ninth place. Competing at the 2022 Winter Olympics in the pairs event, Barquero/Zandron were eleventh in the short program after receiving only a base level on their death spiral. They were eleventh in the free skate as well, and they finished eleventh overall.

In September 2022, Barquero was issued with a one-year competition ban backdated to February 2022 in relation to an anti-doping rule violation after testing positive for unintentional use of clostebol at the 2022 Winter Olympics in Beijing. Barquero said that the positive test result came from cross-contamination from a cream she did not use but which was stored in a drawer with other products.

Barquero and Zandron did not enter the 2022 World Championships due to her suspension at the time.

=== 2022–2023 season ===
Barquero and Zandron began preparing for the 2023 World Championships toward the end of her suspension period; however, after a few days of training, she again tested positive for clostebol. A hair test found that the most likely cause was again accidental contact with her skin rather than doping-related usage, but she was not able to find where the contamination came from.

=== 2024–25 season ===
In July, Zandron officially announced that he and Barquero had been "forced to end their partnership" after two seasons of not competing. While it was recognized that she did not have intentional contact with clostebol, she was given a six-year suspension ending in February 2028.

== Programs ==
=== Pair skating with Marco Zandron ===
| Season | Short program | Free skating |
|---|---|---|
| 2021–2022 | Dawn of Faith by Eternal Eclipse | Awakening by Andy Quin; Imagine performed by Boyce Avenue; Imagine performed by the Royal Philharmonic Orchestra |

=== Pair skating with Tòn Cónsul ===
| Season | Short program | Free skating |
|---|---|---|
| 2019–2020 | Where's My Love by Syml | The Journey Back In Time (from Somewhere in Time) by John Barry |

=== Pair skating with Aritz Maestu ===
| Season | Short program | Free skating |
|---|---|---|
| 2018–2019 | Buona sera signorina by Fred Buscaglione | 2046 (soundtrack) by Shigeru Umebayashi |
| 2017–2018 | Unchained Melody (from Ghost) by Alex North | Romeo and Juliet by Abel Korzeniowski; Come Gentle Night; The Cheek Of The Night; A Thousand Times Good Night |

=== Single skating ===
| Season | Short program | Free skating |
|---|---|---|
| 2016–2017 | Hurt by Christina Aguilera | Life Goes to a Party by Benny Goodman; Bei Mir Bistu Shein by Sholom Secunda |

== Competitive highlights ==
=== Pair skating with Marco Zandron ===
Competition placements at senior level
| Season | 2020–21 | 2021–22 |
|---|---|---|
| Winter Olympics | | 11th |
| European Championships | | 9th |
| Spanish Championships | 1st | |
| CS Finlandia Trophy | | 6th |
| CS Nebelhorn Trophy | | 2nd |
| CS Warsaw Cup | | 8th |
| Lombardia Trophy | | 2nd |
| Trophée Métropole Nice | | 1st |

=== Pair skating with Tòn Cónsul ===
International
| Event | 19–20 |
|---|---|
| Worlds | C |
| Europeans | 14th |
| CS Golden Spin | 8th |
| CS Warsaw | 4th |
| Challenge Cup | 9th |
| Denis Ten MC | 2nd |
| Icelab Cup | 3rd |
National
| Spanish Champ. | 1st |

=== Pair skating with Aritz Maestu ===
International
| Event | 17–18 | 18–19 |
|---|---|---|
| Worlds | 20th | 15th |
| Europeans | 11th | 7th |
| GP Finland | | 7th |
| GP NHK Trophy | | 6th |
| CS Finlandia | | 8th |
| CS Lombardia | 7th | 5th |
| CS Nebelhorn | 13th | |
| CS Warsaw Cup | 7th | |
| Bavarian Open | | 1st |
| Challenge Cup | 1st | |
| Cup of Nice | 6th | |
| Ice Star | | 2nd |
| Toruń Cup | 1st | |
National
| Spanish Champ. | 1st | 1st |

=== Single skating ===
International: Junior
| Event | 15–16 | 16–17 |
|---|---|---|
| JGP Estonia | | 18th |
| Bavarian Open | | 11th |
| Open d'Andorra | | 4th |
| Seibt Memorial | 20th | |
National
| Spanish Champ. | | 1st J |

== Detailed results ==
=== Pair skating with Marco Zandron ===
2021–22 season
| Date | Event | SP | FS | Total |
|---|---|---|---|---|
| 18–19 February 2022 | 2022 Winter Olympics | 11; 63.34 | 11; 118.02 | 11; 181.36 |
| 10–16 January 2022 | 2022 European Championships | 8; 60.65 | 8; 107.75 | 9; 168.40 |
| 17–20 November 2021 | 2021 CS Warsaw Cup | 6; 62.41 | 10; 104.93 | 8; 167.34 |
| 7–10 October 2021 | 2021 CS Finlandia Trophy | 4; 65.33 | 5; 124.66 | 6; 189.99 |
| 22–25 September 2021 | 2021 CS Nebelhorn Trophy | 3; 62.01 | 1; 119.60 | 2; 181.61 |
| 10–12 September 2021 | 2021 Lombardia Trophy | 2; 65.12 | 1; 119.82 | 2; 184.94 |
2020–21 season
| Date | Event | SP | FS | Total |
| 19–21 March 2021 | 2021 Spanish Championships | 1; 55.04 | 1; 96.57 | 1; 151.61 |

=== Pair skating with Tòn Cónsul ===
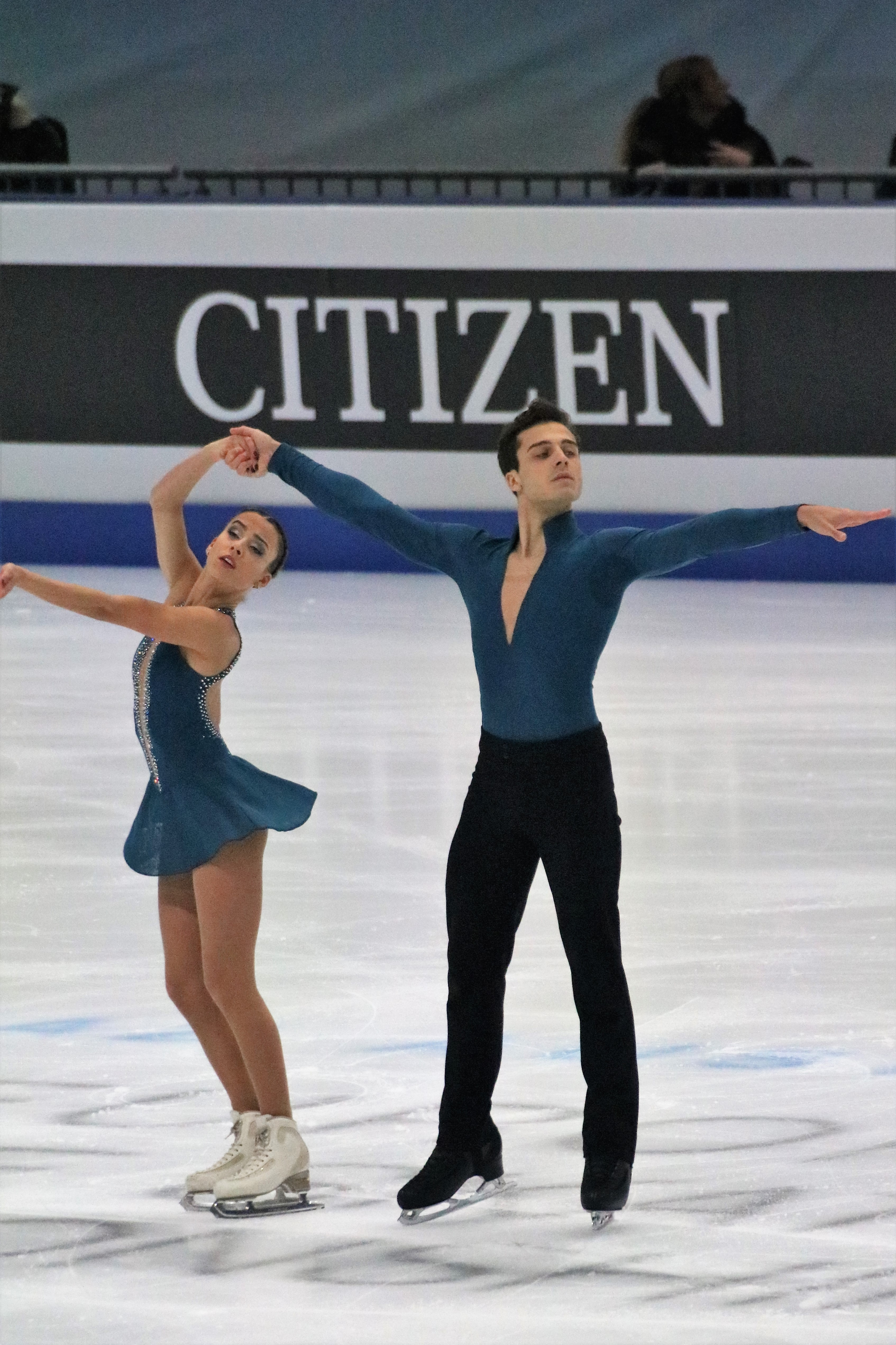
Barquero/Cónsul at the 2020 European Championships

2019–20 season
| Date | Event | SP | FS | Total |
|---|---|---|---|---|
| 20–23 February 2020 | 2020 Challenge Cup | 10; 48.15 | 9; 91.92 | 9; 139.37 |
| 20–26 January 2020 | 2020 European Championships | 15; 46.79 | 14; 88.89 | 14; 135.68 |
| 4–7 December 2019 | 2019 CS Golden Spin of Zagreb | 9; 52.22 | 8; 101.61 | 8; 153.83 |
| 14–17 November 2019 | 2019 CS Warsaw Cup | 6; 54.30 | 4; 105.66 | 4; 159.96 |
| 1–3 November 2019 | 2019 Icelab International Cup | 3; 52.18 | 5; 86.34 | 3; 138.52 |
| 10–12 October 2019 | 2019 Denis Ten Memorial Challenge | 2; 50.83 | 1; 98.41 | 2; 149.24 |

=== Pair skating with Aritz Maestu ===
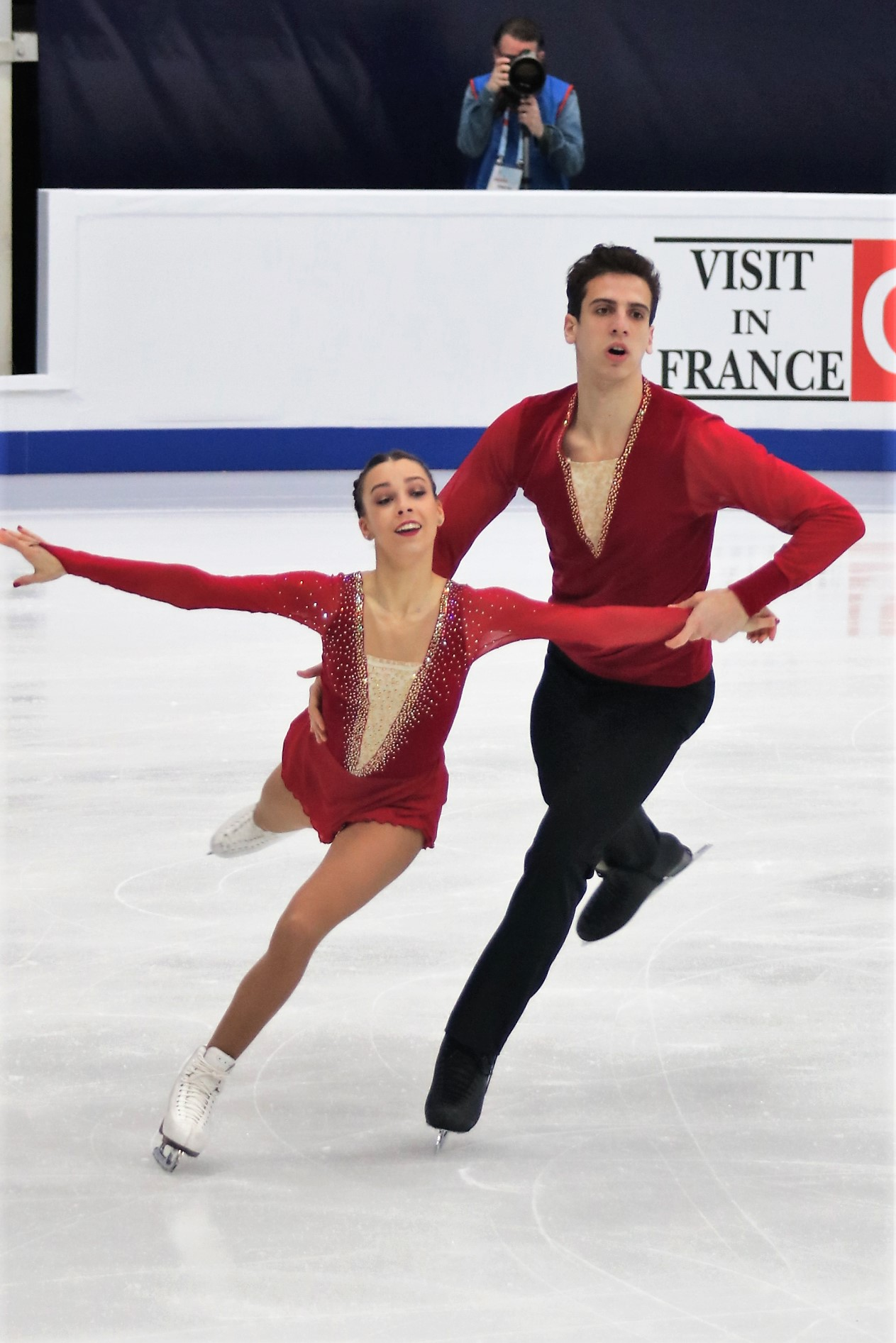
Barquero/Maestu at the 2018 European Championships

2018–19 season
| Date | Event | SP | FS | Total |
|---|---|---|---|---|
| 18–24 March 2019 | 2019 World Championships | 14; 55.58 | 15; 106.69 | 15; 162.27 |
| 5–10 February 2019 | 2019 Bavarian Open | 1; 61.29 | 2; 108.70 | 1; 169.99 |
| 21–27 January 2019 | 2019 European Championships | 9; 53.89 | 7; 106.27 | 7; 160.16 |
| 14–16 December 2018 | 2018 Spanish Championships | 1; 59.94 | 1; 100.15 | 1; 160.09 |
| 9–11 November 2018 | 2018 NHK Trophy | 6; 55.37 | 6; 104.22 | 6; 159.59 |
| 2–5 November 2018 | 2018 Grand Prix of Helsinki | 7; 50.91 | 8; 98.63 | 7; 149.54 |
| 18–21 October 2018 | 2018 Ice Star | 3; 61.00 | 2; 105.15 | 2; 166.15 |
| 12–16 September 2018 | 2018 CS Lombardia Trophy | 6; 45.94 | 4; 99.13 | 5; 145.07 |
2017–18 season
| Date | Event | SD | FS | Total |
| 19–25 March 2018 | 2018 World Championships | 20; 58.36 | – | 20; 58.36 |
| 22–25 February 2018 | 2018 Challenge Cup | 1; 57.66 | 1; 101.50 | 1; 159.16 |
| 30 Jan. – 4 Feb. 2018 | 2018 CS Toruń Cup | 2; 50.85 | 1; 97.53 | 1; 148.38 |
| 15–21 January 2018 | 2018 European Championships | 11; 51.46 | 11; 100.62 | 11; 152.08 |
| 15–17 December 2017 | 2017 Spanish Championships | 1; 46.81 | 1; 97.13 | 1; 143.94 |
| 16–19 November 2017 | 2017 CS Warsaw Cup | 6; 49.96 | 7; 93.30 | 7; 143.26 |
| 27–30 September 2017 | 2017 Nebelhorn Trophy | 13; 49.78 | 13; 95.32 | 13; 145.10 |
| 14–17 September 2017 | 2017 CS Lombardia Trophy | 7; 49.44 | 7; 90.80 | 7; 140.24 |
