= Marco Zandron =

Italian-Spanish pair skater (born 1998)

Personal information
- Other names: Zandrón
- Born: 30 September 1998 (age 28) Bolzano, Italy
- Height: 1.94 m (6 ft 4 in)

Figure skating career
- Country: Uzbekistan (since 2025); Spain (2020-25); Italy (2010–20)
- Discipline: Pair skating
- Partner: Ekaterina Geynish (since 2025); Brooke McIntosh (2024-25); Laura Barquero (2020–22); Federica Zamponi (2018–20)
- Coach: Dmitri Savin; Fedor Klimov; Bruno Marcotte; Nolan Seegert
- Skating club: Club Hielo Madrid Dream
- Began skating: 2004

Medal record
Representing Spain
Spanish Championships
Gold medal – first place	2021 Valdemoro	Pairs
Gold medal – first place	2025 Logroño	Pairs

Marco Zandron (born 30 September 1998) is an Italian-Spanish figure skater who currently represents Uzbekistan.

With former partner Brooke McIntosh, he is the 2025 Spanish national champions.

With his former skating partner, Laura Barquero, he is the 2021 CS Nebelhorn Trophy silver medalist and the 2021 Spanish national champion.

With his former partner, Federica Zamponi, competing for Italy, he is the 2020 Italian junior national silver medalist. As a single skater for Italy, he is the 2017 Egna Spring Trophy champion and competed on the ISU Junior Grand Prix circuit.

== Personal life ==
Zandron was born on September 30, 1998, in Bolzano, Italy. His older brother, Maurizio, competes for Austria in men's singles. As of September 2021, he is a student at the Università Cattolica del Sacro Cuore. Zandron became a Spanish citizen on December 29, 2021.

== Career ==
=== Early career ===
Zandron began learning how to skate in 2004 as a six-year-old. He began representing Italy internationally in men's singles at the novice level as early as 2010. He earned eight medals at international junior and senior B assignments throughout his career but was unable to achieve podium placement at the Italian Championships, therefore limiting his international assignment opportunities. He chose to end his singles career in December 2018 to focus on pair skating.

=== 2018–2020: Partnership with Zamponi ===
Zandron teamed up with his first pairs partner, Federica Zamponi, before the 2018–19 season. They placed third at the Italian junior national championships in their debut season. During the 2019–20 season, Zamponi/Zandron competed on the Junior Grand Prix circuit and won two international junior B medals: silver at the 2019 Egna Spring Trophy and gold at the 2019 Icelab International Cup. Before dissolving their partnership, they won the silver medal at the 2020 Italian junior championships.

=== 2020–2021 season: Debut of Barquero/Zandron ===
Zandron teamed up with Laura Barquero to compete for Spain in advance of the 2020–21 season, and in January 2021, they were formally cleared to represent Spain. They won the Spanish national title in their first outing together but did not compete internationally during the season.

=== 2021–2022 season: Beijing Olympics ===
Barquero/Zandron made their international debut on the Challenger series at the 2021 Lombardia Trophy. They were second in the short program and won the free skate, taking the silver medal overall and finishing less than four points behind Italian national champions Della Monica/Guarise. They were next assigned to the 2021 CS Nebelhorn Trophy, attempting to qualify a berth for Spain at the 2022 Winter Olympics. Third in the short program, they won the free skate despite two jump errors, taking the silver medal overall and the first of three pairs berths available at the event. This was the first time a Spanish pair qualified to the Winter Olympics. Barquero said she was "proud" of their work, while Zandron said he was confident that he would acquire Spanish citizenship in time to attend the Games. At their second Challenger, the 2021 CS Finlandia Trophy, they placed sixth with new personal bests in both segments and overall.

Zandron obtained his Spanish citizenship on December 29, 2021, making the team eligible to represent Spain at the Winter Olympics. In the new year, they competed together at their first European Championships, finishing in ninth place. Competing at the 2022 Winter Olympics in the pairs event, Barquero/Zandron were eleventh in the short program, receiving only a base level on their death spiral. Eleventh in the free skate as well; they finished eleventh overall.

On 22 February, the International Testing Agency reported that a sample taken from Barquero following the short program at the Olympics tested positive for a banned substance, a Clostebol metabolite. Her team suggested that the most likely source of the substance was the Trofodermin that she applied to a cut between her fingers caused by her skate blades during the short program. Due to Barquero's pending anti-doping case, Barquero/Zandron consequently were not entered for the 2022 World Championships scheduled for the end of March.

=== 2024–25 season: Debut of McIntosh/Zandron ===
In July, Zandron officially announced that he and Barquero had been "forced to end their partnership" after two seasons of not competing. It was then announced that he had teamed up with Canadian skater Brooke McIntosh to compete for Spain. It was subsequently announced that the pair would split their time training under Nolan Seegert in Berlin, Dmitri Savin and Fedor Klimov in Sochi, and Bruno Marcotte in Oakville, Ontario. McIntosh was officially released from Skate Canada in October 2024.

McIntosh/Zandron would debut as a pair on the 2024–25 ISU Challenger Series, finishing eleventh at the 2024 CS Warsaw Cup and at the 2024 CS Golden Spin of Zagreb. In December, the pair would win the 2025 Spanish Championships. The pair were subsequently named to the 2025 World Championships team on the condition that they are able to earn the minimum technical element scores.

In February, it was announced that the team had split.

== Programs ==
=== Pair skating with Brooke McIntosh (for Spain) ===
Season	Short program	Free skating
2024–2025	Outro by M83 & Justin Meldal-Johnsen choreo. by Sofia Evdokimova	The Great Escape / Place de la République by Patrick Watson, Cœur de pirate, & Orchestre Métropolitain de Montréal choreo. by Mark Pillay & Paul Boll

=== Pair skating with Laura Barquero (for Spain) ===
Season	Short program	Free skating
2021–2022	Dawn of Faith By Eternal Eclipse	Awakening By Andy Quin; Imagine Performed by Boyce Avenue; Imagine Performed by the Royal Philharmonic Orchestra

== Competitive highlights ==
- JGP – Event of the ISU Junior Grand Prix Series
- CS – Event of the ISU Challenger Series

=== Pair skating with Brooke McIntosh (for Spain) ===
Competition placements at senior level
Season	2024–25
Spanish Championships	1st
CS Golden Spin of Zagreb	11th
CS Warsaw Cup	11th
Merano Ice Trophy	6th

=== Pair skating with Laura Barquero (for Spain) ===
Competition placements at senior level
Season	2020–21	2021–22
Winter Olympics		11th
European Championships		9th
Spanish Championships	1st	
CS Finlandia Trophy		6th
CS Nebelhorn Trophy		2nd
CS Warsaw Cup		8th
Lombardia Trophy		2nd
Trophée Métropole Nice		1st

=== Pair skating with Federica Zamponi (for Italy) ===
Competition placements at junior level
Season	2018–19	2019–20
Italian Championships	3rd	2nd
JGP Croatia		14th
JGP Poland		11th
Alpen Trophy	4th	
Bavarian Open		WD
Egna Spring Trophy	2nd	
IceLab Cup		1st
Volvo Open Cup		7th

== Detailed results ==
=== Pair skating with Brooke McIntosh (for Spain) ===
Results in the 2024–25 season
Date	Event	SP		FS		Total	
Date	Event	P	Score	P	Score	P	Score
Nov 20–24, 2024	(Poland) 2024 CS Warsaw Cup	11	47.75	12	82.15	11	129.90
Dec 4-7, 2024	(Croatia) 2024 CS Golden Spin of Zagreb	11	49.40	11	78.77	11	128.17
Dec 12-15, 2024	(Spain) 2025 Spanish Championships	1	58.13	1	105.68	1	163.81
Feb 13-16, 2025	(Italy) 2025 Merano Ice Trophy	4	51.56	6	93.37	6	144.93

=== Pair skating with Laura Barquero (for Spain) ===
2021–22 season
Date	Event	SP	FS	Total
February 18–19, 2022	2022 Winter Olympics	11; 63.34	11; 118.02	11; 181.36
January 10–16, 2022	2022 European Championships	8; 60.65	8; 107.75	9; 168.40
November 17–20, 2021	2021 CS Warsaw Cup	6; 62.41	10; 104.93	8; 167.34
October 7–10, 2021	2021 CS Finlandia Trophy	4; 65.33	5; 124.66	6; 189.99
September 22–25, 2021	2021 CS Nebelhorn Trophy	3; 62.01	1; 119.60	2; 181.61
September 10–12, 2021	2021 Lombardia Trophy	2; 65.12	1; 119.82	2; 184.94
2020–21 season
19–21 March 2021	2021 Spanish Championships	1; 55.04	1; 96.57	1; 151.61
