= Juan Legaz =

Spanish figure skater

Personal information
- Born: 27 March 1987 (age 39) Córdoba, Argentina
- Height: 1.74 m (5 ft 8 1/2 in)

Figure skating career
- Country: Spain
- Discipline: Men's singles
- Began skating: 1995
- Retired: 2006

Medal record
Spanish Championships
| Gold medal – first place | 2005 Madrid | Singles |
| Silver medal – second place | 2004 Jaca | Singles |

Juan Legaz (born 27 March 1987) is a Spanish former competitive figure skater. He is the 2005 Spanish national champion and placed as high as 15th at the World Junior Championships.

== Programs ==
| Season | Short program | Free skating |
|---|---|---|
| 2005–2006 | Kismet performed by Bond | Vue Du Ciel by Michel Gondry |
| 2004–2005 | Kismet performed by Bond | Jesus Christ Superstar by Andrew Lloyd Webber Boston Philharmonic Orchestra |
| 2003–2004 | Korobushka (based on Korobeiniki) performed by Bond | Jesus Christ Superstar by Andrew Lloyd Webber Boston Philharmonic Orchestra |
| 2002–2003 | Korobushka (based on Korobeiniki) performed by Bond | La Torre del oro "Preludio"; Rigoletto by Giuseppe Verdi; Music by Gioachino Rossini all performed by Royal Philharmonic Orchestra |

== Competitive highlights ==
International
| Event | 01–02 | 02–03 | 03–04 | 04–05 | 05–06 |
|---|---|---|---|---|---|
| European Champ. | | | | 32nd | |
| Schäfer Memorial | | | | | 18th |
| Triglav Trophy | | | | 2nd | |
International: Junior
| World Junior Champ. | | 30th | 36th | 15th | |
| JGP Andorra | | | | | 10th |
| JGP Mexico | | | 9th | | |
| JGP Slovakia | | 19th | | | |
| EYOF | | 6th | | | |
| Triglav Trophy | 16th | | | | |
National
| Spanish Champ. | 3rd J | 1st J | 2nd | 1st | |
