= Celia Robledo =

Spanish ice dancer

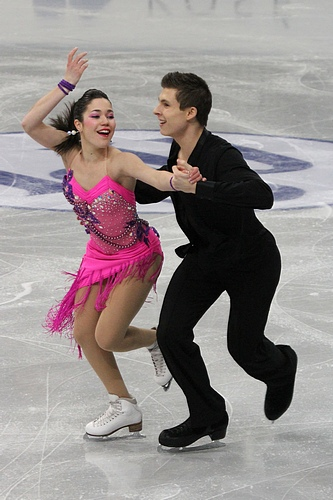
- Robledo/Fenero at the 2012 World Junior Championships

Personal information
- Born: 7 April 1994 (age 32) Alcorcón, Spain
- Height: 1.57 m (5 ft 2 in)

Figure skating career
- Country: Spain
- Partner: Luis Fenero
- Coach: Romain Haguenauer, Marie-France Dubreuil, Patrice Lauzon, Pascal Denis
- Began skating: 1999
- Retired: March 9, 2018

Celia Robledo (born 7 April 1994) is a Spanish retired ice dancer. With her skating partner, Luis Fenero, she competed in the final segment at two ISU Championships — 2013 Junior Worlds in Milan, Italy; and 2016 Europeans in Bratislava, Slovakia.

Robledo competed in single skating early in her career. In 2011, she switched to ice dancing and teamed up with Fenero. They moved from Madrid, Spain to Lyon, France, to train under Muriel Boucher-Zazoui and Romain Haguenauer. In July 2014, they relocated with Haguenauer to Montreal, Quebec, Canada.

== Programs ==
=== With Fenero ===
Season	Short dance	Free dance
2017–2018	Shakira medley	Crédito - La Identidad Inaccessible by Alberto Iglesias; Por el Amor de Amar (Necesito Amor) by Concha Buika; Poeta En El Viento by Vicente Amigo
2016-2017	The Pink Panther Theme; Goldwing Ramble by Transatlantic Swing Band	De Todo un Poco by Michael Lloyd; (I've Had) The Time of My Life by John Morris Orchestra
2015–2016	Sangre de toro by Johannes Linstead; Bolero of Fire by Taylor Davis	Al borde de l'abismo by Cesar Benito; La terre vu du ciel by Armand Amar
2014–2015	Suspiros de Espana	Leccion de Vida; La terre vue du ciel
2012–2013	Your Heart Is As Black As Night by Beth Hart, Joe Bonamassa; Tough Lover (from Burlesque) by Christina Aguilera	Chicago (soundtrack)
2011–2012	Eso Es El Amor by Gloria Lasso	The Mission by Ennio Morricone

=== Single skating ===
Season	Short program	Free skating
2010–2011	Malagueña by Ernesto Lecuona	Miss Saigon by Claude-Michel Schönberg
2009–2010	Turandot by Giacomo Puccini	Tango de los Exilados by Walter Taieb
2008–2009	Swan Lake by Pyotr Tchaikovsky	Concerto Per Tuo Ricordo by Osvaldo Cadanhe

== Competitive highlights ==
=== With Fenero ===
International
Event	2011–12	2012–13	2013–14	2014–15	2015–16	2016–17	2017–18
Worlds					26th		
Europeans				22nd	19th		
CS Autumn Classic						8th	8th
CS Finlandia							12th
CS Golden Spin							14th
Bavarian Open						7th	
Cup of Nice			11th			6th	
Ice Challenge			11th				
NRW Trophy		11th J.	10th				
Open d'Andorra						5th	
Universiade				7th			
International: Junior
Junior Worlds	24th	16th					
JGP Croatia		9th					
JGP Turkey		12th					
Bavarian Open	7th J.						
Trophy of Lyon	5th J.	7th J.					
National
Spanish Champ.	1st J.	1st J.	2nd	2nd	1st	3rd	3rd

=== Single skating ===
International
Event	2008–09	2009–10	2010–11
World Junior Champ.		48th	25th PR
JGP France			23rd
JGP Spain	29th		
Cup of Nice		6th J.	
Warsaw Cup		14th J.	
Merano Cup			
National
Spanish Champ.	4th J.	1st J.	1st J.
