= Luis Fenero =

Spanish ice dancer

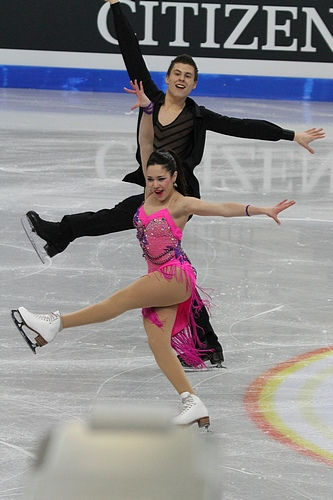
- Robledo/Fenero at the 2012 World Junior Championships

Personal information
- Born: 23 July 1992 (age 34) Jaca, Spain
- Height: 1.88 m (6 ft 2 in)

Figure skating career
- Country: Spain
- Coach: Romain Haguenauer, Marie-France Dubreuil, Patrice Lauzon, Pascal Denis
- Began skating: 1998
- Retired: 9 March 2018

Luis Fenero (born 23 July 1992) is a Spanish retired ice dancer. With partner Celia Robledo, he has competed in the final segment at two ISU Championships — 2013 Junior Worlds in Milan, Italy; and 2016 Europeans in Bratislava, Slovakia.

Fenero competed with Maria Antolin from 2008 to 2010 and with Emili Arm from 2010 to 2011. He teamed up with Robledo in 2011. They moved from Madrid, Spain, to Lyon, France, to train under Muriel Boucher-Zazoui and Romain Haguenauer. In July 2014, they relocated with Haguenauer to Montreal, Canada.

== Programs ==
=== With Robledo ===
| Season | Short dance | Free dance |
|---|---|---|
| 2017–2018 | Shakira medley | Crédito - La Identidad Inaccessible by Alberto Iglesias; Por el Amor de Amar (Necesito Amor) by Concha Buika; Poeta En El Viento by Vicente Amigo |
| 2016-2017 | Theme from the Pink Panther soundtrack; Goldwing Ramble by Transatlantic Swing band | De Todo un Poco by Michael Lloyd; (I've Had) The Time of My Life by John Morris Orchestra |
| 2015–2016 | Sangre de toro by Johannes Linstead; Bolero of Fire by Taylor Davis | Al borde de l'abismo by Cesar Benito; La terre vu du ciel by Armand Amar |
| 2014–2015 | Suspiros de Espana | Leccion de Vida; La terre vue du ciel |
| 2012–2013 | Your Heart Is As Black As Night by Beth Hart, Joe Bonamassa; Tough Lover (from Burlesque) by Christina Aguilera | Chicago (soundtrack) |
| 2011–2012 | Eso Es El Amor by Gloria Lasso | The Mission by Ennio Morricone |

=== With Antolin ===
| Season | Original dance | Free dance |
|---|---|---|
| 2009–2010 | Entre dos aguas by Paco de Lucía | El Tango de Roxanne (from Moulin Rouge!) by Mariano Nores |

== Competitive highlights ==
=== With Robledo ===
International
| Event | 2011–12 | 2012–13 | 2013–14 | 2014–15 | 2015–16 | 2016–17 | 2017–18 |
|---|---|---|---|---|---|---|---|
| Worlds | | | | | 26th | | |
| Europeans | | | | 22nd | 19th | | |
| CS Autumn Classic | | | | | | 8th | 8th |
| CS Finlandia | | | | | | | 12th |
| CS Golden Spin | | | | | | | 14th |
| Bavarian Open | | | | | | 7th | |
| Cup of Nice | | | 11th | | | 6th | |
| Ice Challenge | | | 11th | | | | |
| NRW Trophy | | 11th J. | 10th | | | | |
| Open d'Andorra | | | | | | 5th | |
| Universiade | | | | 7th | | | |
International: Junior
| Junior Worlds | 24th | 16th | | | | | |
| JGP Croatia | | 9th | | | | | |
| JGP Turkey | | 12th | | | | | |
| Bavarian Open | 7th J. | | | | | | |
| Trophy of Lyon | 5th J. | 7th J. | | | | | |
National
| Spanish Champ. | 1st J. | 1st J. | 2nd | 2nd | 1st | 3rd | 3rd |
JGP = Junior Grand Prix; J. = Junior level

=== With Arm ===
International
| Event | 2010–11 |
|---|---|
| JGP Czech Republic | 14th |
| Bavarian Open | 9th J. |
| NRW Trophy | 16th J. |
National
| Spanish Championships | 2nd J. |
JGP = Junior Grand Prix; J. = Junior level

=== With Antolin ===
International
| Event | 2008–09 | 2009–10 |
|---|---|---|
| JGP Germany | | 21st |
| NRW Trophy | | 18th J. |
| Santa Claus Cup | | 8th J. |
National
| Spanish Championships | 1st J. | 2nd J. |
JGP = Junior Grand Prix; J. = Junior level

=== Single skating ===
International
| Event | 2006–2007 |
|---|---|
| Triglav Trophy | 7th N. |
N. = Novice level

== Personal life ==
Fenero is openly gay. Fenero has been in a relationship with Canadian figure skater Eric Radford since 2016. The pair wed on 12 July 2019.
