= Spanish Figure Skating Championships =

National figure skating championships in Spain

- Status: Active
- Genre: National championships
- Frequency: Annual
- Country: Spain
- Inaugurated: 1979
- Organizer: Royal Spanish Ice Sports Federation

The Spanish Figure Skating Championships (Spanish: Campeonato de España de Patinaje Artístico) are an annual figure skating competition organized by the Royal Spanish Ice Sports Federation (Spanish: Real Federación Española de Deportes de Hielo) to crown the national champions of Spain. Although regional or state competitions had previously been held, the first official national figure skating championships in Spain took place in January 1979 in Bilbao. Guest skaters from Andorra and other nations in Europe have occasionally competed at the Spanish Championships.

Figure skating in Spain has long been hampered by a lack of resources, including available ice, as well as low student enrollment. In 1994, there were roughly one hundred registered skaters in all of Spain.

Medals are awarded in men's singles, women's singles, pair skating, and ice dance at the senior and junior levels, although not every discipline is held every year due to a lack of participants. Javier Fernández currently holds the record for winning the most Spanish Championship titles in men's singles (with eight), while Marta Andrade holds the record in women's singles (with ten). Aritz Maestu holds the record in pair skating (with six), although those were not all with the same partner. Likewise, Adrián Díaz holds the record in ice dance (with seven), and also not all with the same partner.

== Senior medalists ==
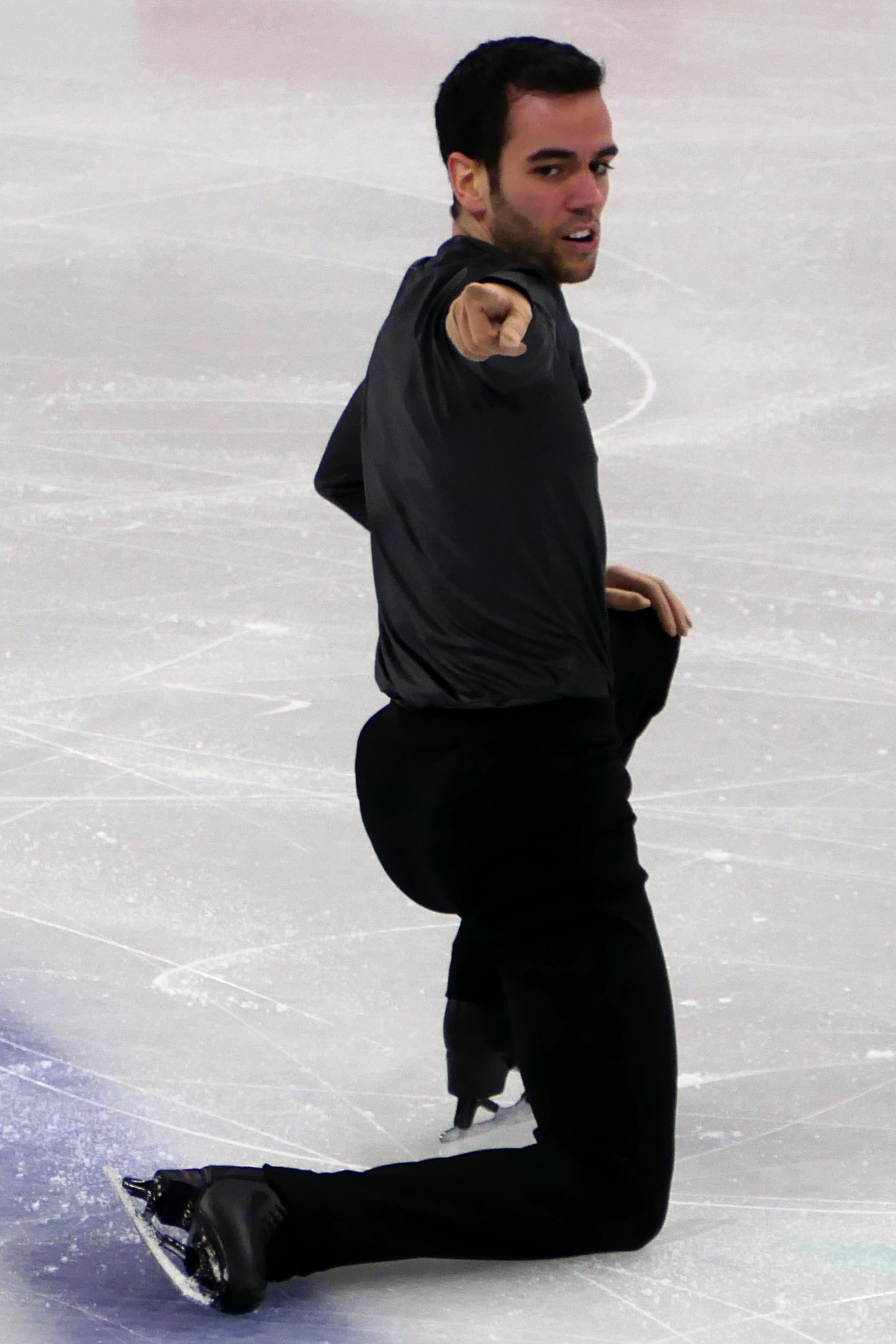
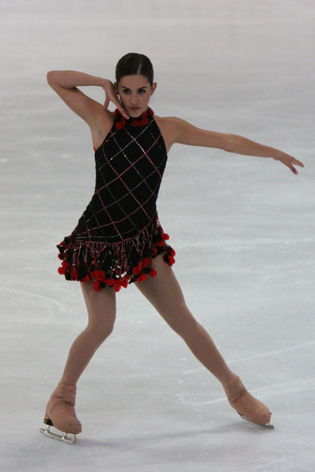
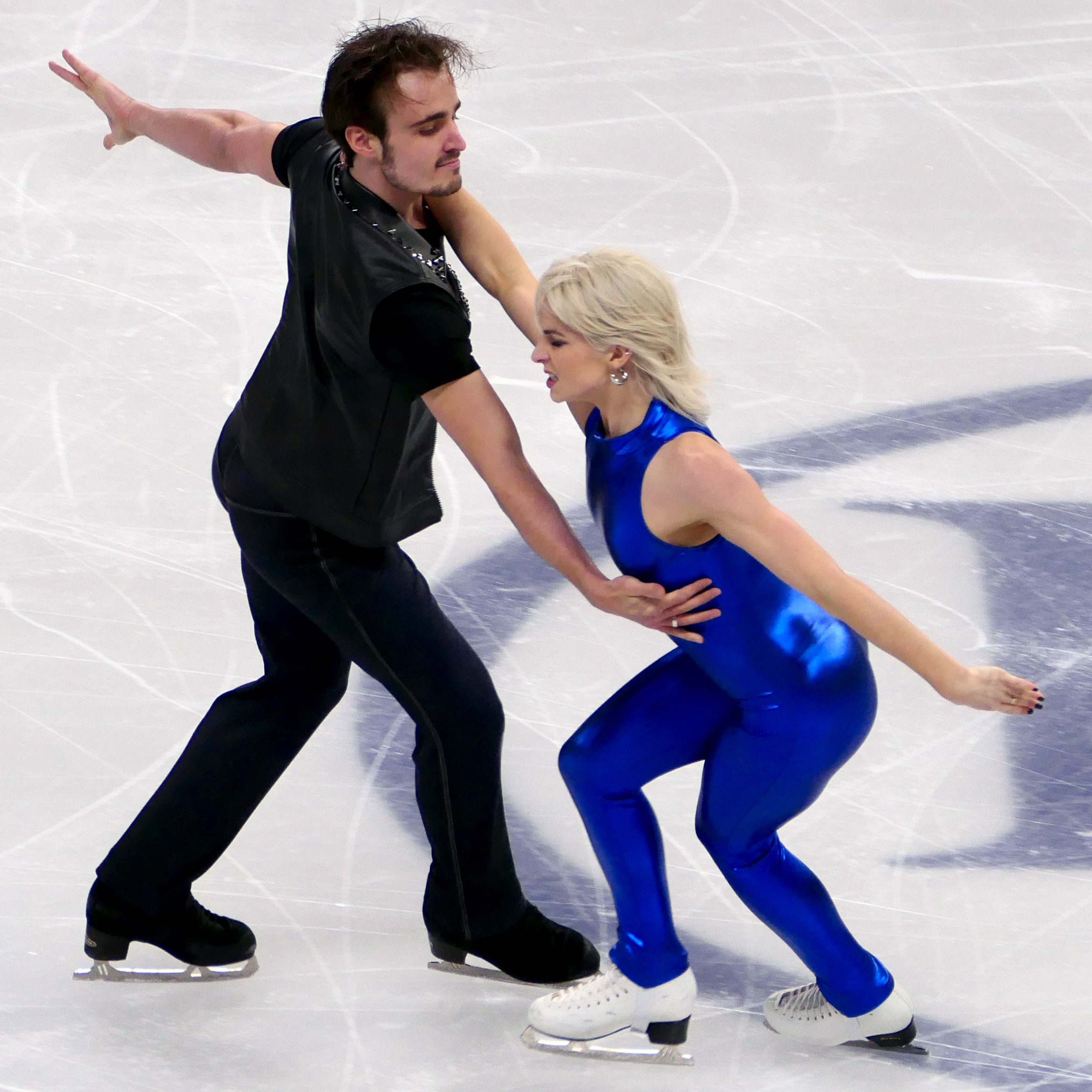
From left to right: Tomàs-Llorenç Guarino Sabaté, five-time Spanish champion in men's singles; Sonia Lafuente, seven-time Spanish champion in women's singles; and Olivia Smart and Tim Dieck, three-time Spanish champions in ice dance

=== Men's singles ===
Men's event medalists
Year	Location	Gold	Silver	Bronze	Ref.
1979	Bilbao	Alberto del Saz	Luis Javier López	No other competitors	
1980	Barcelona	Antonio Ochoa	Carlos Olozagarre	No other competitors	
1981	(No records found)	(No records found)			
1982	Barcelona	José Antonio Rodrigo	Antonio Ochoa	No other competitors	
1983	Jaca	Fernando Soria	No other competitors		
1984	(No records found)	Fernando Soria	(No records found)		
1985	Puigcerdà	Fernando Soria	Francisco Bueno	No other competitors	
1986		Fernando Soria			
1987					
1988	Puigcerdà				
1989	Jaca				
1990	Barcelona	David Valivé	Iván Sáez	No other competitors	
1991	Jaca	Jordi LaFarga	(No records found)		
1992					
1993		Daniel Peinado			
1994		Daniel Peinado	(No records found)		
1995	Vielha	Daniel Peinado			
1996		Jordi Pedro	Daniel Peinado	Miguel Alegre	
1997	Madrid	Jordi Pedro	Daniel Peinado	Miguel Alegre	
1998		Daniel Peinado	Yon García		
1999	Vitoria-Gasteiz	Yon García	Miguel Alegre	Jordi Pedro	
2000	Jaca	Jordi Pedro	Yon García		
2001	San Sebastián	Yon García	Daniel Peinado	Miguel Ballestero	
2002	Barcelona	Yon García			
2003	Barcelona	Yon García	Daniel Peinado	No other competitors	
2004	Madrid	Yon García	No other competitors		
2005	Madrid	Juan Legaz	Yon García	No other competitors	
2006	Collado Villalba	Yediel Cantón	Javier Fernández		
2007	Jaca	Salvador Vallejo	No other competitors		
2008	Madrid	No senior-level competitors			
2009	Logroño	No senior-level competitors			
2010	Madrid	Javier Fernández	No other competitors		
2011	Barcelona	Javier Raya	Javier Fernández	Felipe Montoya	
2012	Jaca	Javier Fernández	Felipe Montoya	No other competitors	
2013	Madrid	Javier Fernández	Javier Raya	Felipe Montoya	
2014	Jaca	Javier Fernández	Javier Raya	Felipe Montoya	
2015	Granada	Javier Fernández	Javier Raya	Felipe Montoya	
2016	San Sebastián	Javier Fernández	Felipe Montoya	Javier Raya	
2017	Vielha	Javier Fernández	Javier Raya	Felipe Montoya	
2018	Jaca	Javier Fernández	Javier Raya	Felipe Montoya	
2019	Logroño	Héctor Alonso	Javier Raya	No other competitors	
2020	San Sebastián	Aleix Gabara	No other competitors		
2021	Valdemoro	Tomàs-Llorenç Guarino Sabaté	Pablo García	No other competitors	
2022	Jaca	Tomàs-Llorenç Guarino Sabaté	Pablo García	Iker Oyarzabal	
2023	Madrid	Tomàs-Llorenç Guarino Sabaté	Pablo García	Euken Alberdi	
2024	Logroño	Tomàs-Llorenç Guarino Sabaté	Iker Oyarzabal	Euken Alberdi	
2025	Logroño	Tomàs-Llorenç Guarino Sabaté	Pablo García	Euken Alberdi	
2026	Jaca	Tomàs-Llorenç Guarino Sabaté	Pablo García	Euken Alberdi	

=== Women's singles ===
Women's event medalists
Year	Location	Gold	Silver	Bronze	Ref.
1979	Bilbao	Gloria Mas	Inmaculada Tona	Laura Cierco	
1980	Barcelona	Gloria Mas	No other competitors		
1981	(No records found)	Charo Esteban	(No records found)		
1982	Barcelona	Charo Esteban	Rosa Maria Pardo	Meritxeil Estrada	
1983	Jaca	Charo Esteban	Cristina Haas	Rosa Maria Pardo	
1984	(No records found)	Charo Esteban	(No records found)		
1985	Puigcerdà	Marta Olozagarre	Betty Martin-Mora	Cristina Haas	
1986	(No records found)	(No records found)			
1987	(No records found)	Sandra Escoda	(No records found)		
1988	Puigcerdà	Yvonne Gómez	Marta Olozagarre	Sandra Escoda	
1989	Jaca	Yvonne Gómez	Sandra Escoda	Marta Olozagarre	
1990	Barcelona	Laia Papell	Cristina Pérez	Cristina Massons	
1991	Jaca	Marta Andrade	(No records found)		
1992					
1993					
1994		Marta Andrade	(No records found)		
1995	Vielha	Marta Andrade	Susana Palés		
1996		Marta Andrade	Marta Senra	Elena María Sarasa	
1997	Madrid	Marta Andrade			
1998		Marta Andrade	Marta Senra	Rosa Muela	
1999	Vitoria-Gasteiz	Marta Andrade	Marta Senra	Rosa Muela	
2000	Jaca	Marta Andrade	Melania Albea	Carolina Fernández	
2001	San Sebastián	Marta Andrade	Melania Albea	Rosa Muela	
2002	Barcelona	Marta Andrade	Alibel Alegre		
2003	Barcelona	Marta Andrade	Alibel Alegre	Melania Albea	
2004	Madrid	Meritxel Baraut	No other competitors		
2005	Madrid	Jenifer Tena	No other competitors		
2006	Collado Villalba				
2007	Jaca	Melissandre Fuentes (Andorra)	No other competitors		
2008	Madrid	No senior-level competititors			
2009	Logroño	No senior-level competititors			
2010	Madrid	Sonia Lafuente	No other competitors		
2011	Barcelona	Monica Gimeno	No other competitors		
2012	Jaca	Sonia Lafuente	Monica Gimeno	(United Kingdom) Alisa Morozova (Great Britain)	
2013	Madrid	Sonia Lafuente	Monica Gimeno	No other competitors	
2014	Jaca	Sonia Lafuente	Marta García	No other competitors	
2015	Granada	Sonia Lafuente	Marta García	No other competitors	
2016	San Sebastián	Sonia Lafuente	Marta García	No other competitors	
2017	Vielha	Valentina Matos	Sonia Lafuente	No other competitors	
2018	Jaca	No women's competitors			
2019	Logroño	Valentina Matos	No other competitors		
2020	San Sebastián	Valentina Matos	No other competitors		
2021	Valdemoro	Marian Millares	Lucía Ruíz	No other competitors	
2022	Jaca	Marian Millares	Marie Kolly-Millasson	Lucía Ruíz	
2023	Madrid	Marie Kolly-Millasson	Marian Millares	Lucía Ruíz	
2024	Logroño	Emilia Murdock	Celia Vandhana	Marian Millares	
2025	Logroño	Nuria Rodríguez	Celia Vandhana	Lucía Ruíz	
2026	Jaca	Ariadna Gupta Espada	Nahia Olaizola Muguruza	Alexandra Martinez Carbó	

=== Pairs ===
Pairs event medalists
Year	Location	Gold	Silver	Bronze	Ref.
1989	Jaca	Yolanda Centeno; Evaristo Rodríguez	(No records found)		
2013	Madrid	Veronica Grigoreva; Aritz Maestu	No other competitors		
2014	Jaca	Veronica Grigoreva; Aritz Maestu	No other competitors		
2015	Granada	Marcelina Lech; Aritz Maestu	No other competitors		
2016	San Sebastián	Marcelina Lech; Aritz Maestu	No other competitors		
2017	Vielha	No pairs competitors			
2018	Jaca	Laura Barquero; Aritz Maestu	Dorota Broda; Pedro Betegón	No other competitors	
2019	Logroño	Laura Barquero; Aritz Maestu	Dorota Broda; Pedro Betegón	No other competitors	
2020	San Sebastián	Laura Barquero; Tòn Cónsul	Dorota Broda; Pedro Betegón	No other competitors	
2021	Valdemoro	Laura Barquero; Marco Zandron	Dorota Broda; Pedro Betegón	No other competitors	
2022	Jaca	Dorota Broda; Pedro Betegón	No other competitors		
2023	Madrid	No pairs competitors			
2024	Logroño	No pairs competitors			
2025	Logroño	Brooke McIntosh; Marco Zandron	No other competitors		
2026	Jaca	Megan Yudin; Patrizio Romano Rossi Lopez	No other competitors		

=== Ice dance ===
Ice dance event medalists
Year	Location	Gold	Silver	Bronze	Ref.
No ice dance competitors prior to 2012
2012	Jaca	Sara Hurtado; Adrià Díaz	No other competitors		
2013	Madrid	Sara Hurtado; Adrià Díaz	No other competitors		
2014	Jaca	Sara Hurtado; Adrià Díaz	Celia Robledo; Luis Fenero	No other competitors	
2015	Granada	Sara Hurtado; Adrià Díaz	Celia Robledo; Luis Fenero	No other competitors	
2016	San Sebastián	Celia Robledo; Luis Fenero	No other competitors		
2017	Vielha	Sara Hurtado; Kirill Khaliavin	Olivia Smart; Adrián Díaz	Celia Robledo; Luis Fenero	
2018	Jaca	Olivia Smart; Adrián Díaz	Sara Hurtado; Kirill Khaliavin	Celia Robledo; Luis Fenero	
2019	Logroño	Sara Hurtado; Kirill Khaliavin	Olivia Smart; Adrián Díaz	No other competitors	
2020	San Sebastián	Olivia Smart; Adrián Díaz	Sara Hurtado; Kirill Khaliavin	No other competitors	
2021	Valdemoro	No ice dance competitors			
2022	Jaca	Olivia Smart; Adrián Díaz	Sara Hurtado; Kirill Khaliavin	No other competitors	
2023	Madrid	No ice dance competitors			
2024	Logroño	Olivia Smart; Tim Dieck	Sofía Val; Asaf Kazimov	Philomene Sabourin; Raul Bermejo	
2025	Logroño	Olivia Smart; Tim Dieck	Sofía Val; Asaf Kazimov	Philomene Sabourin; Raul Bermejo	
2026	Jaca	Olivia Smart; Tim Dieck	Sofía Val; Asaf Kazimov	Philomene Sabourin; Raul Bermejo	

== Junior medalists ==
=== Men's singles ===
Junior men's event medalists
Year	Location	Gold	Silver	Bronze	Ref.
2007	Jaca	Javier Fernández	Javier Raya	Manuel Legaz	
2008	Madrid	Javier Fernández	Javier Raya	Aritz Maestu	
2009	Logroño	Javier Fernández	Javier Raya	Aritz Maestu	
2010	Madrid	Javier Raya	Felipe Montoya	Alejandro Soler	
2011	Barcelona	Víctor Bustamante	Daniel Périz	Javier Cano	
2012	Jaca	Víctor Bustamante	Javier Cano	No other competitors	
2013	Madrid	Víctor Bustamante	Héctor Alonso	Javier Cano	
2014	Jaca	Víctor Bustamante	Héctor Alonso	Tòn Cónsul	
2015	Granada	Aleix Gabara	Tòn Cónsul	Héctor Alonso	
2016	San Sebastián	Héctor Alonso	Tòn Cónsul	Aleix Gabara	
2017	Vielha	Tòn Cónsul	Aleix Gabara	Héctor Alonso	
2018	Jaca	Aleix Gabara	Gaizka Madejón	Iker Oyarzabal	
2019	Logroño	Aleix Gabara	Arnau Joly Atanasio	Pablo García	
2020	San Sebastián	Pablo García	Arnau Joly Atanasio	Iker Oyarzabal	
2021	Valdemoro	Iker Oyarzabal	Euken Alberdi	Miguel Martos	
2022	Jaca	Euken Alberdi	Christian Vaquero Toro	Daniel Rouco Morcillo	
2023	Madrid	Daniel Rouco Morcillo	Adrián Jimenez de Baldomero	Mahery Randrianarivony	
2024	Logroño	Adrián Jiménez de Baldomero	André Zapata	Mahery Randrianarivony	
2025	Logroño	André Zapata	Raül Garcia Shibinskaya (Andorra)	Guiu Oliver Verbón	
2026	Jaca	André Zapata	Arturo Alonso Fernández	Raül Garcia Shibinskaya (Andorra)	

=== Women's singles ===
Junior women's event medalists
Year	Location	Gold	Silver	Bronze	Ref.
2007	Jaca	Sonia Lafuente	Irene Aguilar	Lydia Fuentes	
2008	Madrid	Sonia Lafuente	Laura Fernández	Irene Aguilar	
2009	Logroño	Sonia Lafuente	Marta García	Noella Rodriguez	
2010	Madrid	Lénaëlle Gilleron-Gorry (France) (Note: Although Celia Robledo finished in fourth place, she was named the 2010 Spanish Junior Champion, because the first-, second-, and third-place finishers were all guest skaters from France.)	Pauline Arnaud (France)	Anaïs Ventard (France)	
2011	Barcelona	Celia Robledo	Marta García	María Jiménez	
2012	Jaca	Elena Mangas	Marta García	Marta Cuní	
2013	Madrid	Marta García	Elena Mangas	Idoia Fuentes	
2014	Jaca	Maria Martínez	Elena Mangas	Maeva Gallarda	
2015	Granada	Maeva Gallarda	Júlia Ribas	Irene Manau	
2016	San Sebastián	Maeva Gallarda	Valentina Matos	Idoia Fuentes	
2017	Vielha	Laura Barquero	Belén Álvarez	Daniela Blanco	
2018	Jaca	Belén Álvarez	Anna Bertran	Claudia Justo de Andrés	
2019	Logroño	Marian Miralles	Belén Álvarez	Sara Andreu	
2020	San Sebastián	Marian Miralles	Lucía Ruíz	Alba Patiño	
2021	Valdemoro	Nuria Rodríguez	Celia Vandhana Garnacho	Alba Patiño	
2022	Jaca	Júlia Rodríguez	Celia Vandhana Garnacho	Paula Maragrido (Andorra)	
2023	Madrid	Celia Vandhana Garnacho	Nahia Olaizola	Nuria Rodríguez Serrano	
2024	Logroño	Nahia Olaizola	Alexandra Martínez	Sara Schiavone	
2025	Logroño	Noa Seguí	Carlota García	Ariadna Gupta	
2026	Jaca	Adriana Seguí	Noa Seguí	Daniela López Romero	

=== Pairs ===
Junior pairs event medalists
Year	Location	Gold	Silver	Bronze	Ref.
2007–10	No junior pairs competitors				
2011	Barcelona	Alexandra Rodríguez; Aritz Maestu	No other competitors		
2012	Jaca	Alexandra Rodríguez; Aritz Maestu	No other competitors		
2013	Madrid	Nerea Wiss Bravo; Javier Wiss Bravo	No other competitors		
2014	Jaca	No junior pairs competitors			
2015	Granada	No junior pairs competitors			
2016	San Sebastián	Dorota Broda; Pedro Betegón	No other competitors		
2017	Vielha	Alexanne Bouillon; Tòn Cónsul	Dorota Broda; Pedro Betegón	No other competitors	
2018	Jaca	Isabella Gámez; Tòn Cónsul	No other competitors		
2019–21	No junior pairs competitors				
2022	Jaca	Carolina Shan; Miguel Martos	No other competitors		
2023	Madrid	Inés Moudden; Alejandro García	Linda de Nardin; Patrizio Romano Rossi	No other competitors	
2024	Logroño	Inés Moudden; Alejandro García	Carolina Shan; Pau Vilella	No other competitors	
2025	Logroño	Claudia Sinclair; Noah Quesada	Megan Yudin; Patrizio Romano Rossi Lopez	Inés Moudden; Alejandro García	
2026	Jaca	Anita Mapelli; Noah Quesada	Inés Moudden; Alejandro García	No other competitors	

=== Ice dance ===
Junior ice dance event medalists
Year	Location	Gold	Silver	Bronze	Ref.
2007–09	No junior ice dance competitors				
2010	Madrid	Sara Hurtado; Adria Díaz	(France); Geraldine Bott; Neil Brown; (France)	(France); Tiffany Zahorski; Alexis Miart; (France)	
2011	Barcelona	Sara Hurtado; Adria Díaz	Emili Arm; Luis Fenero	No other competitors	
2012	Jaca	Celia Robledo; Luis Fenero	No other competitors		
2013	Madrid	Celia Robledo; Luis Fenero	No other competitors		
2014	Jaca	No junior ice dance competitors			
2015	Granada	Amelie Giraudon; Jaime García	Adriana Romero; Bruno Piedra	No other competitors	
2016	San Sebastián	Amelie Giraudon; Jaime García	No other competitors		
2017	Vielha	Malene Nichita-Basquin; Jaime García	No other competitors		
2018	Jaca	Malene Nichita-Basquin; Jaime García	Léa Mangas; Nicolas Soleilhavoup	No other competitors	
2019	Logroño	Sofía Val; Linus Colmor Jepsen	Léa Mangas; Nicolas Soleilhavoup	No other competitors	
2020	San Sebastián	Sofía Val; Linus Colmor Jepsen	Martina Rossi; Adriano Rossi	María Pinto; Raúl Bermejo	
2021	Valdemoro	Erika Riera; Raman Balanovich	Martina Rossi; Adriano Rossi	María Pinto; Raúl Bermejo	
2022	Jaca	Sofía Val; Nikita Vitryanyuk	Eloanne Ogor; Raúl Bermejo	No other competitors	
2023	Madrid	Athena Roberts; Eric Alis Bosquet	Eloanne Ogor; Raúl Bermejo	Elena Peña; Antonio Peña	
2024	Logroño	Sara Marcilly; Jolan Engel	Athena Roberts; Eric Alis Bosquet	Elena Peña; Antonio Peña	
2025	Logroño	Sara Marcilly; Jolan Engel	Sofía Pascual Mateos; Sergio Parra	Lara Sundberg; Héctor González	
2026	Jaca	Lara Sundberg; Héctor González	Sara Marcilly; Jolan Engel	Sofía Pascual Mateos; Sergio Parra	

== Records ==
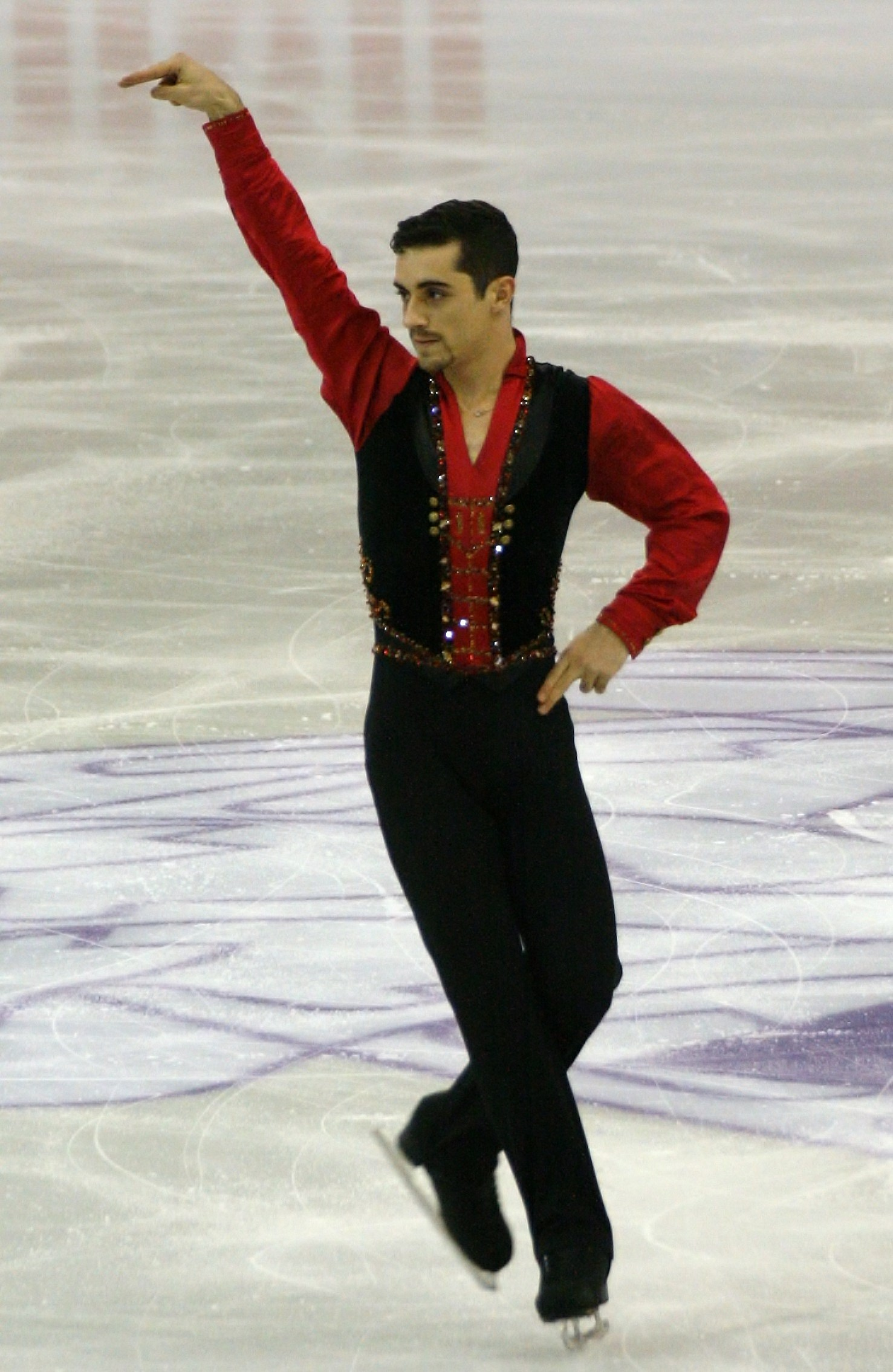
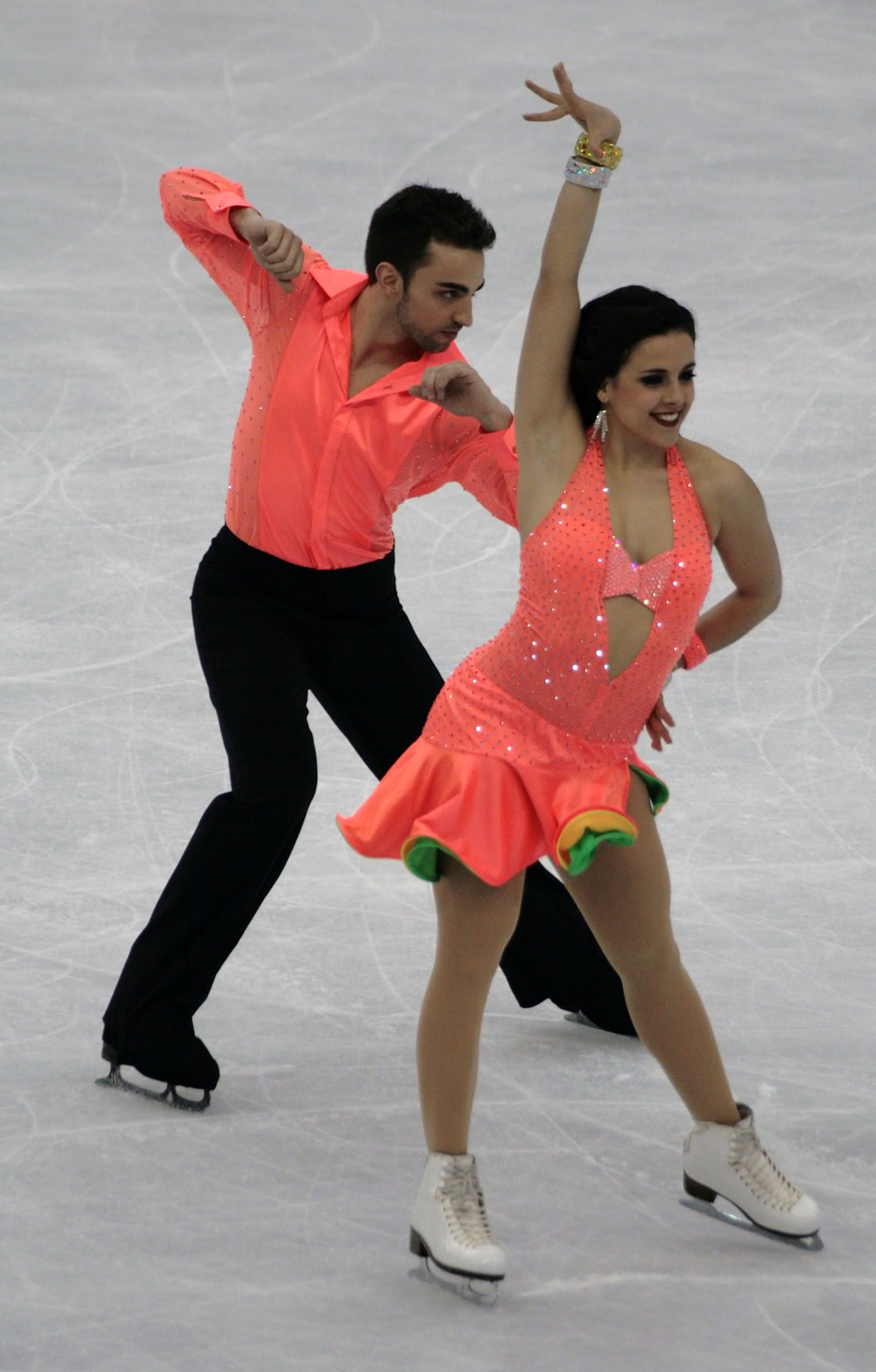
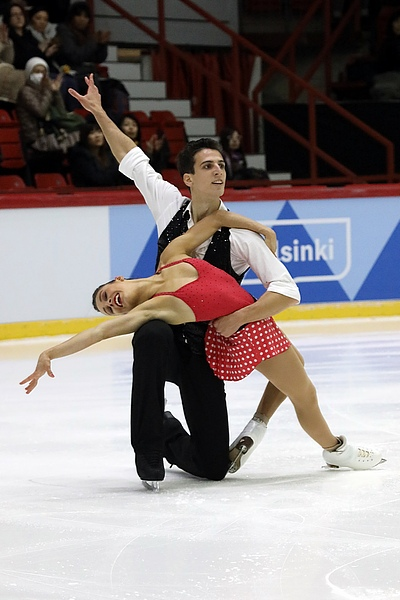
From left to right: Javier Fernández won eight Spanish Championship titles in men's singles; Adrián Díaz won seven Spanish Championship titles in ice dance, four of which while partnered with Sara Hurtado; and Aritz Maestu won six Spanish Championship titles in pair skating, two of which while partnered with Laura Barquero.

Records
Discipline	Most championship titles			
Discipline	Skater(s)	No.	Years	Ref.
Men's singles	Javier Fernández	8	2010; 2012–17	
Women's singles	Marta Andrade	10	1994–2003	
Pairs	Aritz Maestu (Note: Aritz Maestu won two championship titles while partnered with Veronica Grigorieva (2013–14), two with Marcelina Lech (2015–16), and two with Laura Barquero (2018–19).)	6	2013–16; 2018–19	
Ice dance	Adrián Díaz (Note: Adrián Díaz won four championship titles while partnered with Sara Hurtado (2012–15), and three with Olivia Smart (2018, 2020, 2022).)	7	2012–15; 2018; 2020; 2022	
