= Aritz Maestu =

Spanish figure skater

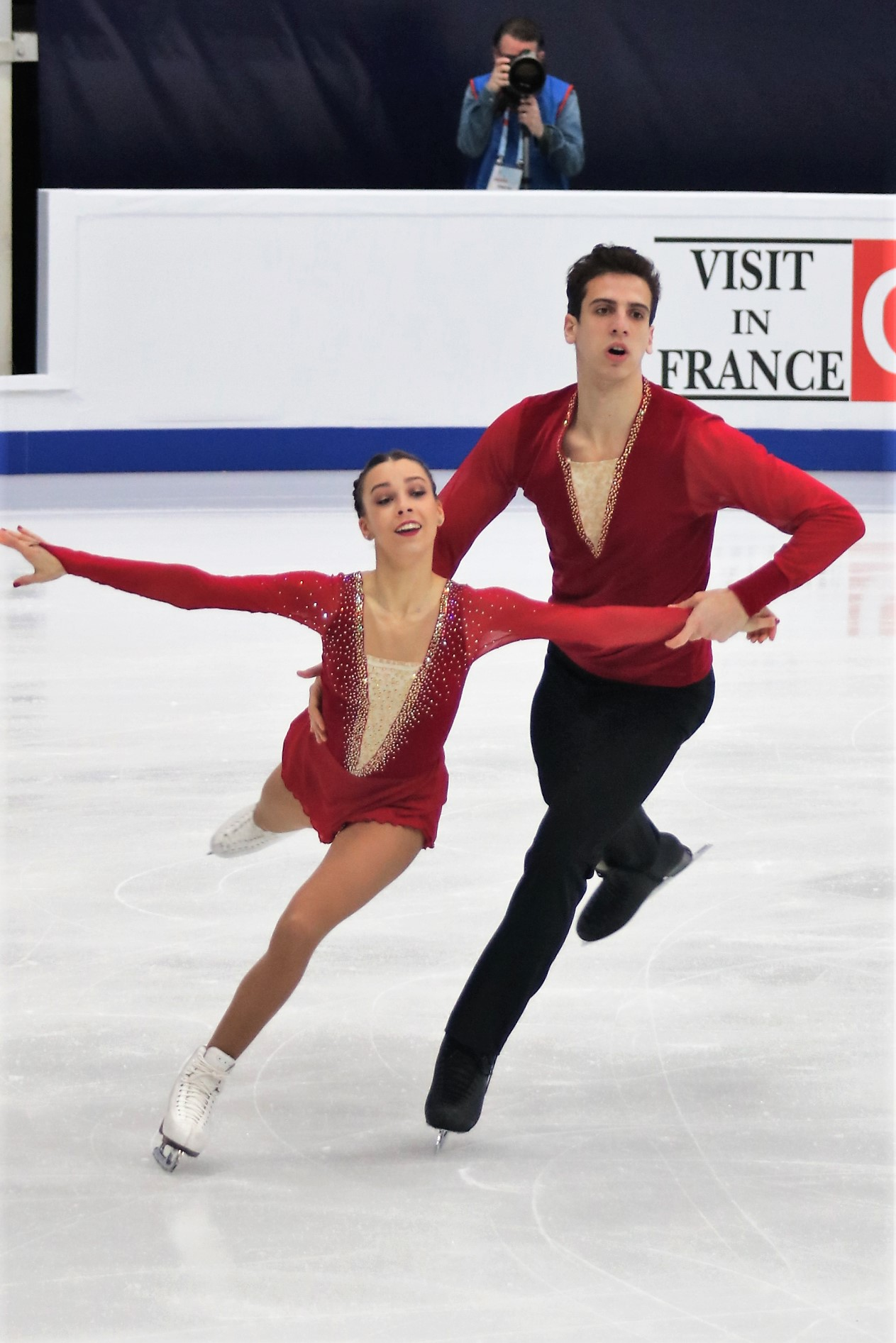
- Laura Barquero and Aritz Maestu at the 2018 European Championships

Personal information
- Full name: Aritz Maestu Babarro
- Born: 19 September 1990 (age 36) San Sebastián, Spain
- Height: 1.88 m (6 ft 2 in)

Figure skating career
- Country: Spain
- Discipline: Pair skating (2010–19); Men's singles (2006–11)
- Partner: Laura Barquero (2017–19); Marcelina Lech (2014–16); Veronica Grigorieva (2012–14); Alexandra Rodríguez Long (2010–12)
- Began skating: 2002
- Retired: 2019

Medal record
Spanish Championships
Gold medal – first place	2013 Majadahonda	Pairs
Gold medal – first place	2014 Jaca	Pairs
Gold medal – first place	2015 Granada	Pairs
Gold medal – first place	2016 San Sebastián	Pairs
Gold medal – first place	2018 Jaca	Pairs
Gold medal – first place	2019 Logroño	Pairs

Aritz Maestu Babarro (born 19 September 1990) is a Spanish former competitive pair skater. With his former skating partner, Laura Barquero, he is the 2018 Toruń Cup champion and 2018 International Challenge Cup champion, and competed for Spain at two World Championships.

== Early career ==
=== Single skating ===
Maestu began learning to skate in 2002. As a single skater, he was coached by Jonathan Levers in San Sebastián. He received one ISU Junior Grand Prix (JGP) assignment, in September 2008.

=== Partnership with Rodríguez ===
Maestu's first pair skating partner was Alexandra Rodríguez Long. They competed two seasons together, beginning in 2010–2011. At JGP Austria in September 2011, they became the first pair to represent Spain in an international competition.

Rodríguez/Maestu skated at the 2012 World Junior Championships in Minsk, Belarus, but were eliminated after placing 12th in the preliminary round. Miguel Alegre and Emma Baxter coached the pair in Jaca, Spain.

=== Partnership with Grigorieva ===
In September 2012, Maestu teamed up with Russia's Veronica Grigorieva to represent Spain on the senior level. The pair trained in Toruń (Poland) and Jaca (Spain), coached by Marius Siudek. Their international debut came in September 2013, at the Lombardia Trophy. A week later, they competed at the 2013 Nebelhorn Trophy, the final qualifying opportunity for the 2014 Winter Olympics. Their placement, 18th, was insufficient to qualify a spot at the Olympics.

Grigorieva/Maestu's final competition together was the 2014 European Championships, which took place in January in Budapest, Hungary. Ranked 20th in the short program, the pair did not advance to the free skate.

=== Partnership with Lech ===
In 2014, Maestu teamed up with Poland's Marcelina Lech to compete for Spain. They made their international debut in February 2015, at the Bavarian Open.

Lech/Maestu placed 13th in the short program, 15th in the free skate, and 15th overall at the 2016 European Championships in Bratislava, Slovakia. They were coached by Dorota Siudek and Mariusz Siudek in Toruń, Poland.

== Partnership with Barquero ==
=== 2016–2017 season ===
Maestu and Laura Barquero announced their partnership on 4 January 2017. They decided to train in Bergamo, Italy, coached by Barbara Luoni and Franca Bianconi. During their first season together, the pair was ineligible for international competitions due to the ISU's age requirements – Barquero was too young for senior events and Maestu too old for juniors.

=== 2017–2018 season ===
Making their international debut, Barquero/Maestu placed 7th at the 2017 CS Lombardia Trophy in mid-September. At the end of the month, they placed 13th at the 2017 CS Nebelhorn Trophy, the final qualifying opportunity for the 2018 Winter Olympics. Although their placement was not sufficient to qualify, Spain became the third alternate for a spot in the Olympic pairs' event.

In January, Barquero/Maestu placed eleventh at the 2018 European Championships in Moscow, Russia. The following month, they won gold at the Toruń Cup in Toruń, Poland, and at the International Challenge Cup in The Hague, Netherlands. They concluded the season at the 2018 World Championships, in twentieth place.

=== 2018–2019 season ===
Barquero/Maestu began the season with two Challenger assignments, finishing fifth at the 2018 CS Lombardia Trophy and eighth at the 2018 CS Finlandia Trophy. Making their Grand Prix debut with two assignments, they were seventh at the 2018 Grand Prix of Helsinki and sixth at 2018 NHK Trophy. At the 2019 European Championships they were seventh, after taking their second consecutive national title. Their final event together was the 2019 World Championships, where they placed fifteenth.

On 31 May 2019 it was announced that Maestu had suffered an injury that would involve a prolonged recovery, and in consequence of this the team had split.

== Programs ==
=== Pair skating with Laura Barquero ===
Season	Short program	Free skating
2017–2018	Unchained Melody (from Ghost) by Alex North	Romeo and Juliet by Abel Korzeniowski; Come Gentle Night; The Cheek Of The Night; A Thousand Times Good Night

=== Pair skating with Marcelina Lech ===
Season	Short program	Free skating
2015–2016	Life Is Beautiful by Nicola Piovani choreo. by Anastasia Vykhodtseva	Singin' in the Rain choreo. by Anastasia Vykhodtseva

=== Pair skating with Veronica Grigorieva ===
Season	Short program	Free skating
2013–2014	Heart of Courage by Two Steps from Hell choreo. by Miguel Alegre	The Artist by Ludovic Bource choreo. by Miguel Alegre

=== Pair skating with Alexandra Rodríguez Long ===
Season	Short program	Free skating
2011–2012	Tango Flamenco by Paco de Lucia choreo. by Emma Baxter	The Phantom of the Opera by Andrew Lloyd Webber choreo. by Emma Baxter

=== Single skating ===
Season	Short program	Free skating
2008–2009	The Mexican by Brian Setzer choreo. by Jonathan Levers	Gettysburg by Randy Edelman choreo. by Jonathan Levers

== Competitive highlights ==
=== Pair skating with Laura Barquero ===
International
Event	2017–18	2018–19
World Championships	20th	15th
European Championships	11th	7th
GP Finland		7th
GP NHK Trophy		6th
CS Finlandia Trophy		8th
CS Lombardia Trophy	7th	5th
CS Nebelhorn Trophy	13th	
CS Warsaw Cup	7th	
Bavarian Open		1st
Challenge Cup	1st	
Cup of Nice	6th	
Ice Star		2nd
Toruń Cup	1st	
National
Spanish Championships	1st	1st

=== Pair skating with Marcelina Lech ===
International
Event	2014–15	2015–16
European Champ.		15th
CS Golden Spin		11th
CS Warsaw Cup		8th
Bavarian Open	6th	
Challenge Cup	5th	
Toruń Cup		6th
National
Spanish Champ.	1st	1st

=== Pair skating with Veronica Grigorieva ===
International
Event	2012–13	2013–14
European Champ.		20th
Golden Spin		5th
Lombardia Trophy		9th
Nebelhorn Trophy		18th
Toruń Cup		2nd
Warsaw Cup		6th
National
Spanish Champ.	1st	1st

=== Pair skating with Alexandra Rodríguez Long ===
International
Event	2010–11	2011–12
World Junior Champ.		21st
JGP Austria		17th
JGP Estonia		11th
National
Spanish Champ.	1st J	1st J

=== Single skating ===
International
Event	06–07	08–09	09–10	10–11
JGP Spain		28th		
Cup of Nice			6th J	
National
Spanish Champ.	6th J	3rd J		4th

== Detailed results ==
=== Pair skating with Laura Barquero ===
2018–19 season
Date	Event	SP	FS	Total
18–24 March 2019	2019 World Figure Skating Championships	14; 55.58	15; 106.69	15; 162.27
5–10 February 2019	2019 Bavarian Open	1; 61.29	2; 108.70	1; 169.99
21–27 January 2019	2019 European Figure Skating Championships	9; 53.89	7; 106.27	7; 160.16
14–16 December 2018	2018 Spanish Championships	1; 59.94	1; 100.15	1; 160.09
9–11 November 2018	2018 NHK Trophy	6; 55.37	6; 104.22	6; 159.59
2–5 November 2018	2018 Grand Prix of Helsinki	7; 50.91	8; 98.63	7; 149.54
12–16 September 2018	2018 CS Lombardia Trophy	6; 45.94	4; 99.13	5; 145.07
2017–18 season
Date	Event	SD	FD	Total
19–25 March 2018	2018 World Figure Skating Championships	20; 58.36	WD	20; 58.36
22–25 February 2018	2018 Challenge Cup	1; 57.66	1; 101.50	1; 159.16
30 January - 4 February 2018	2018 CS Toruń Cup	2; 50.85	1; 97.53	1; 148.38
15–21 January 2018	2018 European Championships	11; 51.46	11; 100.62	11; 152.08
15–17 December 2017	2017 Spanish Championships	1; 46.81	1; 97.13	1; 143.94
16–19 November 2017	2017 CS Warsaw Cup	6; 49.96	7; 93.30	7; 143.26
27–30 September 2017	2017 Nebelhorn Trophy	13; 49.78	13; 95.32	13; 145.10
14–17 September 2017	2017 CS Lombardia Trophy	7; 49.44	7; 90.80	7; 140.24
