= Marta Andrade =

Spanish figure skater

Personal information
- Full name: Marta Andrade Vidal
- Born: 17 May 1972 (age 54) Barcelona, Spain
- Height: 1.65 m (5 ft 5 in)

Figure skating career
- Country: Spain
- Skating club: FC Barcelona
- Began skating: 1975
- Retired: 2002

Medal record
Spanish Championships
Gold medal – first place	1991 Jaca	Singles
Gold medal – first place	1994	Singles
Gold medal – first place	1995 Vielha	Singles
Gold medal – first place	1996	Singles
Gold medal – first place	1997 Madrid	Singles
Gold medal – first place	1998	Singles
Gold medal – first place	1999 Vitoria-Gasteiz	Singles
Gold medal – first place	2000 Jaca	Singles
Gold medal – first place	2001 San Sebastián	Singles
Gold medal – first place	2002 Barcelona	Singles
Gold medal – first place	2003 Barcelona	Singles

Marta Andrade Vidal (born 17 May 1972) is a Spanish former competitive figure skater. She is an eleven-time Spanish national champion and competed in two Winter Olympics, placing 20th in 1994 and 22nd in 1998. She competed in eleven World Championships, achieving her highest placement, 19th, in 2002 in Nagano, Japan.

Andrade lives in Barcelona. She is the main coach at FC Barcelona's figure skating section. She also works as a physiotherapist.

== Programs ==
Season	Short program	Free skating
2001–2002	Giselle by Adolphe Adam Bolshoi Theatre Orchestra	Cavalleria rusticana by Pietro Mascagni; La traviata by Giuseppe Verdi
2000–2001	Life Is Beautiful by Nicola Piovani	Giselle by Adolphe Adam Bolshoi Theatre Orchestra

== Results ==
GP: Champions Series (Grand Prix)

International
Event	90–91	92–93	93–94	94–95	95–96	96–97	97–98	98–99	99–00	00–01	01–02
Winter Olympics			20th				22nd				
World Championships	31st	22nd	27th	25th	26th	28th	28th	26th	41st	30th	19th
European Championships	24th		21st	17th		21st					16th
GP Trophée Lalique						9th	10th				
Golden Spin of Zagreb										9th	15th
Karl Schäfer Memorial							12th	WD	6th		
Nebelhorn Trophy		9th	12th								
Winter Universiade								9th			
National
Spanish Championships	1st		1st	1st	1st	1st	1st	1st	1st	1st	1st
WD = Withdrew
