= Valentina Matos =

Spanish figure skater (born 2000)

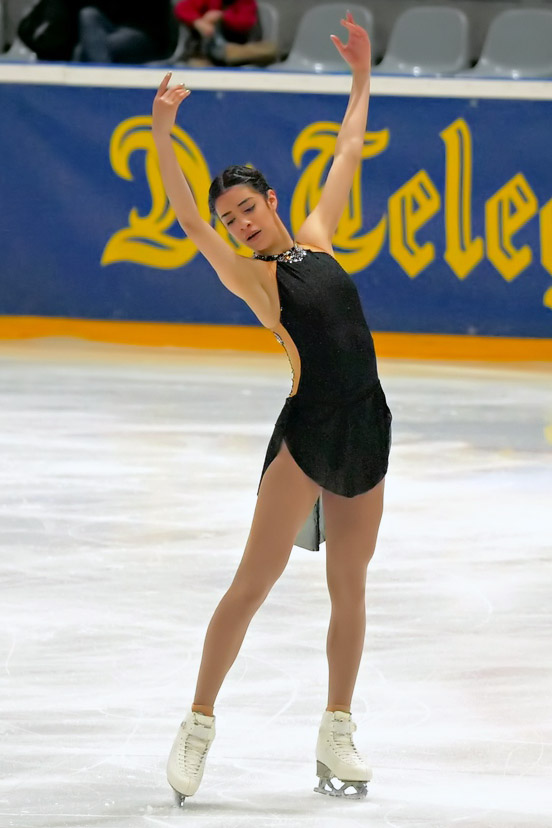
- Valentina Matos at the 2019 Challenge Cup

Personal information
- Full name: Valentina Matos Romero
- Born: 28 September 2000 (age 26) Santo Domingo, Dominican Republic
- Height: 1.76 m (5 ft 9 1/2 in)

Figure skating career
- Country: Spain
- Discipline: Women's singles
- Began skating: 2007

Medal record
Spanish Championships
Gold medal – first place	2017 Vielha	Singles
Gold medal – first place	2019 Logroño	Singles
Gold medal – first place	2020 San Sebastián	Singles

Valentina Matos Romero (born 28 September 2000) is a figure skater. Born in the Dominican Republic, she represents Spain in ladies singles. She is the 2019 Open d'Andorra champion and a three-time Spanish national champion (2016, 2018, 2019). She has competed in the final segment at one ISU Championship.

== Personal life ==
Valentina Matos Romero was born on 28 September 2000 in Santo Domingo, Dominican Republic. She is of Venezuelan descent and arrived in Spain as a one-year-old. After finishing secondary school, she began studying at Universidad Politécnica de Madrid through distance education. In 2022 she stepped away from professional figure skating, studying abroad at Hanyang University in South Korea. In 2023, Matos began a PhD in Chemical & Biomolecular Engineering at Johns Hopkins University in Baltimore, Maryland. Her research focuses on leveraging AI for digital pathology to identify precursor lesions in pancreatic cancer.

== Career ==
=== Early years ===
Matos began learning to skate in 2008. She won the novice ladies' title at the Spanish Championships in December 2014. Her junior international debut came in September 2015, at the Lombardia Trophy. In December 2015, she became the Spanish national junior silver medalist.

=== 2016–2017 season ===
In October 2016, Matos competed for the first time on the ISU Junior Grand Prix series. In November, making her senior international debut, she won silver at the Open d'Andorra. The following month, she outscored Sonia Lafuente by 6.09 points for the senior ladies' title at the Spanish Championships.

In January 2017, Matos competed at the European Championships in Ostrava, Czech Republic, but did not advance to the final segment. She qualified to the free skate and finished 24th overall at the 2017 World Junior Championships, held in March in Taipei, Taiwan.

=== 2017–2018 season ===
Spain assigned Matos to compete at the 2017 CS Nebelhorn Trophy, the final qualifying opportunity for the 2018 Winter Olympics. Due to an ankle injury, she withdrew before the start of the event. She placed 33rd at the 2018 European Championships in Moscow, Russia. She was coached by Carolina Sanz, Ivan Saez, and Jordi Lafarga at La Nevera in Madrid.

=== 2018–2019 season ===
Ahead of the 2018–2019 season, Matos decided to relocate to Italy to train with Barbara Luoni at IceLab in Bergamo.

== Programs ==
Season	Short program	Free skating
2019–2020	You Give Love a Bad Name performed by Bon Jovi choreo. by Massimo Scali, Corrado Giordani	Caprichio Arabe by Francisco Tárrega; Invierno Porteno by Astor Piazzolla; Le di Caza Alcance by Estrella Morente choreo. by Massimo Scali, Corrado Giordani
2017–2019	My Immortal by Evanescence	The Last Coup performed by New Tango Orchestra; Garganta con Arena performed by Pasion Vega
2016–2017	Hallelujah performed by Alexandra Burke	GoldenEye by Éric Serra; GoldenEye performed by Tina Turner

== Competitive highlights ==
CS: Challenger Series; JGP: Junior Grand Prix

International
Event	15–16	16–17	17–18	18–19	19–20
Worlds				34th	
Europeans		33rd	33rd	31st	28th
CS Alpen Trophy				19th	
CS Finlandia				15th	
CS Golden Spin					WD
CS Lombardia				20th	10th
CS Nebelhorn			WD		
CS Warsaw Cup					24th
Bavarian Open		14th			
Denis Ten Memorial					9th
Golden Bear				15th	10th
Ice Star				13th	
Challenge Cup		11th	14th	9th	
Open d'Andorra		2nd		1st	
Santa Claus Cup		4th			
Universiade				14th	
International: Junior
Junior Worlds		24th			
JGP Germany		17th			
Lombardia Trophy	16th				
Santa Claus Cup	26th				
Hellmut Seibt	18th				
National
Spanish Champ.	2nd J	1st		1st	1st
