= Javier Raya =

Spanish figure skater

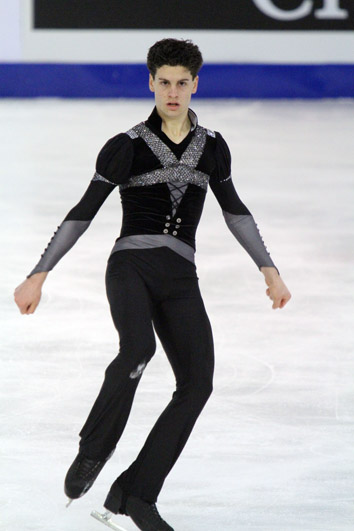
- Javier Raya at the 2010 World Junior Championships

Personal information
- Full name: Francisco Javier Raya Buenache
- Born: 20 April 1991 (age 35) Madrid, Spain
- Height: 1.74 m (5 ft 9 in)

Figure skating career
- Country: Spain
- Discipline: Men's singles
- Began skating: 1998

Medal record
Spanish Championships
Gold medal – first place	2011 Barcelona	Singles
Silver medal – second place	2013 Majadahonda	Singles
Silver medal – second place	2014 Jaca	Singles
Silver medal – second place	2015 Granada	Singles
Silver medal – second place	2017 Vielha	Singles
Silver medal – second place	2018 Jaca	Singles
Silver medal – second place	2019 Logroño	Singles
Bronze medal – third place	2016 San Sebastián	Singles

Francisco Javier Raya Buenache (born 20 April 1991) is a Spanish figure skater. He is the 2011 Spanish national senior champion and has competed in the free skate at eight ISU Championships.

== Personal life ==
Francisco Javier Raya Buenache was born on 20 April 1991 in Madrid. He studied ballet from the age of six until he was 17. He is studying audiovisual communication at the Complutense University of Madrid. Raya is openly gay.

== Career ==
Raya began skating in 1998 at a rink near Madrid's Chamartín railway station. His first coach was Jocelyn Flanagan. He is now coached by Carolina Sanz and Jordi Lafarga in Madrid and spends some time training in Canada during the summer. He has worked with Daniela Slovak in Calgary, Manon Perron in Montreal, and Brian Orser in Toronto.

Raya made his European debut in 2011, finishing 19th. He sustained a leg injury before the 2011 Nebelhorn Trophy but recovered in November. He withdrew from the 2012 Spanish Championships due to illness, and later missed the 2012 Europeans but competed at the 2012 Worlds, where he finished 24th.

Raya competed at the 2014 Winter Olympics in Sochi and placed 25th. He withdrew from the 2014 World Championships due to an injury of the adductor in his left foot. At the 2015 European Championships in Stockholm, he placed 21st in the short program, 14th in the free skate, and 14th overall.

== Programs ==
Season	Short program	Free skating
2016–17	Pure Imagination performed by Jamie Cullum	Swings Both Ways by Robbie Williams
2015–16	Saturday Night Fever by Barry Gibb, Maurice Gibb, Robin Gibb, and David Shire choreo. by Joey Russell	Carne Cruda by Fernando Egozcue; Lejos by Ara Malikian choreo. by Antonio Najarro
2014–15	Moulin Rouge! by Craig Armstrong	West Side Story by Leonard Bernstein
2013–14	Les Misérables by Claude-Michel Schönberg	Sing, Sing, Sing by Louis Prima; Sing, Sing, Sing by Glenn Miller
2012–13	Como Siento Yo; Hip Hip Chin Chin	Funeral for a Friend by Elton John
2011–12	Tango	I Love Paris by The Witnesses
2010–11	Can Can	Tosca by Giacomo Puccini
2009–10	Capone by Ronan Hardiman	Romeo and Juliet
2008–09	Capone by Ronan Hardiman	Concierto de Aranjuez by Joaquín Rodrigo
2007–08	Libertango by Astor Piazzolla	Concierto de Aranjuez by Joaquín Rodrigo
2006–07	Libertango by Astor Piazzolla	Don Quixote by Ludwig Minkus

== Results ==
International
Event	06–07	07–08	08–09	09–10	10–11	11–12	12–13	13–14	14–15	15–16	16–17	17–18	18–19
Olympics								25th					
Worlds						24th		WD		25th	27th	37th	
Europeans					19th		16th	18th	14th		18th		
CS Autumn Classic											7th		
CS Finlandia													18th
CS Golden Spin										13th	10th	15th	17th
CS U.S. Classic										14th			
Autumn Classic										9th			
Cup of Nice				11th	9th	14th			7th				
Dragon Trophy							1st						
Golden Spin					4th	5th		6th					
Hellmut Seibt									5th	6th			
Ice Challenge												2nd	
Challenge Cup									2nd				7th
Lombardia Trophy								8th					
Merano Cup				10th	6th						4th	2nd	
Nebelhorn Trophy						13th							
NRW Trophy							17th						
Open d'Andorra									1st	1st			
Santa Claus Cup									1st				
Triglav Trophy			7th										
Volvo Open Cup							6th						
Universiade					14th			17th	11th				
International: Junior
Junior Worlds	29th		19th	12th									
JGP Austria		19th											
JGP Croatia		16th											
JGP Germany				9th									
JGP South Africa			8th										
JGP Spain			11th										
JGP Turkey				6th									
Cup of Nice		4th	2nd										
Gardena	8th												
Triglav Trophy	4th	1st											
National
Spanish Champ.	2nd J		2nd J	1st J	1st		2nd	2nd	2nd	3rd	2nd	2nd	2nd
