= 2018–19 ISU Grand Prix of Figure Skating =

- Type: Grand Prix
- Date: October 19 – December 9, 2018
- Season: 2018–19
- Previous: 2017–18 Grand Prix
- Next: 2019–20 Grand Prix

The 2018–19 ISU Grand Prix of Figure Skating was a series of senior international competitions organized by the International Skating Union that were held from October 2018 through December 2018. Medals were awarded in men's singles, women's singles, pair skating, and ice dance. Skaters earned points based on their placements at each event and the top six in each discipline qualified to compete at the Grand Prix Final in Vancouver, Canada. The corresponding series for junior-level skaters was the 2018–19 ISU Junior Grand Prix.

== Competitions ==
The series included the following events.

Date	Event	Location	Results
October 19–21	(United States) 2018 Skate America	Everett, Washington, United States	Details
October 26–28	2018 Skate Canada International	Laval, Quebec, Canada	Details
November 2–4	(Finland) 2018 Grand Prix of Helsinki	Helsinki, Finland	Details
November 9–11	(Japan) 2018 NHK Trophy	Hiroshima, Japan	Details
November 16–18	(Russia) 2018 Rostelecom Cup	Moscow, Russia	Details
November 23–25	2018 Internationaux de France	Grenoble, France	Details
December 6–9	(Canada) 2018–19 Grand Prix Final	Vancouver, British Columbia, Canada	Details

== Requirements ==
Skaters are eligible to compete on the senior Grand Prix circuit if they had reached the age of 15 before July 1, 2018. They were also required to have earned a minimum total score at certain international events.

== Assignments ==
The ISU announced the preliminary assignments on June 29, 2018.

=== Men's singles ===
Nation	Skater	Assignment(s)	
Australia	Brendan Kerry	Skate Canada International	Rostelecom Cup
Canada	Keegan Messing	Skate Canada International	Rostelecom Cup
Canada	Nam Nguyen	Skate America	Skate Canada International
Canada	Kevin Reynolds	Skate America	NHK Trophy
China	Jin Boyang	Grand Prix of Helsinki	Internationaux de France
Czech Republic	Michal Březina	Skate America	Grand Prix of Helsinki
France	Kévin Aymoz	Skate Canada International	Internationaux de France
France	Romain Ponsart	Skate America	Internationaux de France
Georgia	Morisi Kvitelashvili	Skate America	Rostelecom Cup
Israel	Alexei Bychenko	Skate America	Grand Prix of Helsinki
Israel	Daniel Samohin	Skate Canada International	Internationaux de France
Italy	Matteo Rizzo	Skate America	NHK Trophy
Japan	Yuzuru Hanyu	Grand Prix of Helsinki	Rostelecom Cup
Japan	Keiji Tanaka	Grand Prix of Helsinki	Internationaux de France
Japan	Kazuki Tomono	Skate Canada International	Rostelecom Cup
Japan	Shoma Uno	Skate Canada International	NHK Trophy
Latvia	Deniss Vasiļjevs	NHK Trophy	Internationaux de France
Malaysia	Julian Zhi Jie Yee	Skate America	Rostelecom Cup
Russia	Dmitri Aliev	NHK Trophy	Internationaux de France
Russia	Mikhail Kolyada	Grand Prix of Helsinki	Rostelecom Cup
Russia	Andrei Lazukin	Grand Prix of Helsinki	Rostelecom Cup
Russia	Alexander Samarin	Skate Canada International	Internationaux de France
Russia	Sergei Voronov	Skate America	NHK Trophy
South Korea	Cha Jun-hwan	Skate Canada International	Grand Prix of Helsinki
Sweden	Alexander Majorov	Skate Canada International	Rostelecom Cup
United States	Jason Brown	Skate Canada International	Internationaux de France
United States	Nathan Chen	Skate America	Internationaux de France
United States	Alexei Krasnozhon	Grand Prix of Helsinki	Rostelecom Cup
United States	Vincent Zhou	Skate America	NHK Trophy
Canada	Nicolas Nadeau	Internationaux de France	
Canada	Roman Sadovsky	Skate Canada International	
Finland	Valtter Virtanen	Grand Prix of Helsinki	
Germany	Paul Fentz	Rostelecom Cup	
Great Britain	Phillip Harris	Grand Prix of Helsinki	
Japan	Hiroaki Sato	NHK Trophy	
Japan	Sōta Yamamoto	NHK Trophy	
Russia	Artur Dmitriev	Rostelecom Cup	
South Korea	Lee June-hyoung	NHK Trophy	
Ukraine	Yaroslav Paniot	NHK Trophy	
United States	Alexander Johnson	NHK Trophy	
United States	Jimmy Ma	Skate America	

=== Ladies' singles ===
Nation	Skater	Assignment(s)	
Belgium	Loena Hendrickx	Skate America	Grand Prix of Helsinki
Canada	Alaine Chartrand	Skate America	Skate Canada International
France	Laurine Lecavelier	Skate America	Internationaux de France
France	Maé-Bérénice Méité	NHK Trophy	Internationaux de France
Japan	Marin Honda	Skate America	Internationaux de France
Japan	Rika Kihira	NHK Trophy	Internationaux de France
Japan	Yura Matsuda	Skate Canada International	Rostelecom Cup
Japan	Mai Mihara	NHK Trophy	Internationaux de France
Japan	Satoko Miyahara	Skate America	NHK Trophy
Japan	Kaori Sakamoto	Skate America	Grand Prix of Helsinki
Japan	Yuna Shiraiwa	Grand Prix of Helsinki	Rostelecom Cup
Japan	Mako Yamashita	Skate Canada International	Rostelecom Cup
Kazakhstan	Elizabet Tursynbaeva	Skate Canada International	Rostelecom Cup
Russia	Stanislava Konstantinova	Grand Prix of Helsinki	Internationaux de France
Russia	Evgenia Medvedeva	Skate Canada International	Internationaux de France
Russia	Daria Panenkova	Skate Canada International	Grand Prix of Helsinki
Russia	Sofia Samodurova	Skate America	Rostelecom Cup
Russia	Maria Sotskova	NHK Trophy	Internationaux de France
Russia	Polina Tsurskaya	Skate America	Rostelecom Cup
Russia	Elizaveta Tuktamysheva	Skate Canada International	NHK Trophy
Russia	Alina Zagitova	Grand Prix of Helsinki	Rostelecom Cup
South Korea	Lim Eun-soo	NHK Trophy	Rostelecom Cup
Switzerland	Alexia Paganini	Rostelecom Cup	Internationaux de France
United States	Starr Andrews	Skate America	Skate Canada International
United States	Mariah Bell	Skate Canada International	NHK Trophy
United States	Bradie Tennell	Skate America	Internationaux de France
United States	Angela Wang	Grand Prix of Helsinki	NHK Trophy
Australia	Kailani Craine	NHK Trophy	
Canada	Alicia Pineault	Skate Canada International	
Finland	Viveca Lindfors	Grand Prix of Helsinki	
Finland	Emmi Peltonen	Grand Prix of Helsinki	
France	Léa Serna	Internationaux de France	
Japan	Wakaba Higuchi	Skate Canada International	
Japan	Rika Hongo	Grand Prix of Helsinki	
Russia	Alena Leonova	NHK Trophy	
South Korea	Kim Ha-nul	Grand Prix of Helsinki	
Sweden	Matilda Algotsson	Internationaux de France	
United States	Gracie Gold	Rostelecom Cup	
United States	Courtney Hicks	NHK Trophy	
United States	Megan Wessenberg	Skate America	

=== Pairs ===
Nation	Team	Assignment(s)	
Australia	Ekaterina Alexandrovskaya / Harley Windsor	Skate Canada International	Rostelecom Cup
Austria	Miriam Ziegler / Severin Kiefer	Grand Prix of Helsinki	Rostelecom Cup
Canada	Kirsten Moore-Towers / Michael Marinaro	Skate Canada International	NHK Trophy
Canada	Camille Ruest / Andrew Wolfe	Skate Canada International	Internationaux de France
Canada	Evelyn Walsh / Trennt Michaud	Skate America	Skate Canada International
China	Peng Cheng / Jin Yang	Skate Canada International	NHK Trophy
France	Vanessa James / Morgan Ciprès	Skate Canada International	Internationaux de France
Germany	Minerva Fabienne Hase / Nolan Seegert	Skate America	Internationaux de France
Italy	Nicole Della Monica / Matteo Guarise	Grand Prix of Helsinki	Rostelecom Cup
Japan	Miu Suzaki / Ryuichi Kihara	Grand Prix of Helsinki	NHK Trophy
North Korea	Ryom Tae-ok / Kim Ju-sik	Grand Prix of Helsinki	Internationaux de France
Russia	Aleksandra Boikova / Dmitrii Kozlovskii	Skate Canada International	Internationaux de France
Russia	Alisa Efimova / Alexander Korovin	Skate America	Rostelecom Cup
Russia	Daria Pavliuchenko / Denis Khodykin	Grand Prix of Helsinki	Rostelecom Cup
Russia	Evgenia Tarasova / Vladimir Morozov	Skate America	Rostelecom Cup
Russia	Natalia Zabiiako / Alexander Enbert	Grand Prix of Helsinki	NHK Trophy
Spain	Laura Barquero / Aritz Maestu	Grand Prix of Helsinki	NHK Trophy
United States	Ashley Cain / Timothy LeDuc	Skate America	Rostelecom Cup
United States	Tarah Kayne / Danny O'Shea	NHK Trophy	Internationaux de France
United States	Audrey Lu / Misha Mitrofanov	NHK Trophy	Internationaux de France
United States	Alexa Scimeca Knierim / Chris Knierim	Skate America	NHK Trophy
United States	Deanna Stellato / Nathan Bartholomay	Grand Prix of Helsinki	Rostelecom Cup
Germany	Annika Hocke / Ruben Blommaert	Skate America	
United States	Haven Denney / Brandon Frazier	Skate Canada International	
United States	Nica Digerness / Danny Neudecker	Skate America	

=== Ice dance ===
Nation	Team	Assignment(s)	
Canada	Piper Gilles / Paul Poirier	Skate Canada International	Internationaux de France
Canada	Carolane Soucisse / Shane Firus	Skate Canada International	NHK Trophy
China	Wang Shiyue / Liu Xinyu	Skate Canada International	NHK Trophy
France	Marie-Jade Lauriault / Romain Le Gac	Skate Canada International	Internationaux de France
Germany	Katharina Müller / Tim Dieck	Skate America	Grand Prix of Helsinki
Great Britain	Lilah Fear / Lewis Gibson	Skate America	NHK Trophy
Great Britain	Robynne Tweedale / Joseph Buckland	Skate America	Skate Canada International
Italy	Charlène Guignard / Marco Fabbri	Skate America	Grand Prix of Helsinki
Japan	Misato Komatsubara / Tim Koleto	NHK Trophy	Rostelecom Cup
Lithuania	Allison Reed / Saulius Ambrulevičius	Rostelecom Cup	Internationaux de France
Poland	Natalia Kaliszek / Maksym Spodyriev	Skate America	Rostelecom Cup
Russia	Betina Popova / Sergey Mozgov	Grand Prix of Helsinki	Internationaux de France
Russia	Victoria Sinitsina / Nikita Katsalapov	Skate Canada International	Internationaux de France
Russia	Anastasia Skoptcova / Kirill Aleshin	Skate Canada International	NHK Trophy
Russia	Alexandra Stepanova / Ivan Bukin	Grand Prix of Helsinki	Rostelecom Cup
Russia	Tiffany Zahorski / Jonathan Guerreiro	Skate America	NHK Trophy
Spain	Sara Hurtado / Kirill Khaliavin	Grand Prix of Helsinki	Rostelecom Cup
Spain	Olivia Smart / Adrián Díaz	Skate Canada International	Internationaux de France
Ukraine	Alexandra Nazarova / Maxim Nikitin	Skate America	NHK Trophy
United States	Christina Carreira / Anthony Ponomarenko	Grand Prix of Helsinki	Rostelecom Cup
United States	Kaitlin Hawayek / Jean-Luc Baker	NHK Trophy	Internationaux de France
United States	Madison Hubbell / Zachary Donohue	Skate America	Skate Canada International
United States	Lorraine McNamara / Quinn Carpenter	Skate America	Grand Prix of Helsinki
United States	Rachel Parsons / Michael Parsons	NHK Trophy	Internationaux de France
Canada	Haley Sales / Nikolas Wamsteeker	Skate Canada International	
Finland	Juulia Turkkila / Matthias Versluis	Grand Prix of Helsinki	
France	Adelina Galyavieva / Louis Thauron	Internationaux de France	
France	Gabriella Papadakis / Guillaume Cizeron	Internationaux de France	
Italy	Jasmine Tessari / Francesco Fioretti	Grand Prix of Helsinki	
Germany	Shari Koch / Christian Nüchtern	Grand Prix of Helsinki	
Hungary	Anna Yanovskaya / Ádám Lukács	Rostelecom Cup	
Russia	Sofia Evdokimova / Egor Bazin	Rostelecom Cup	
Russia	Annabelle Morozov / Andrei Bagin	Rostelecom Cup	
United States	Karina Manta / Joseph Johnson	Skate America	

=== Changes to preliminary assignments ===
==== Skate America ====
Discipline	Withdrew		Added		Notes	Ref.
Discipline	Date	Skater(s)	Date	Skater(s)	Notes	Ref.
Pairs	July 9	(China) Yu Xiaoyu / Zhang Hao	July 31	(Germany) Minerva Fabienne Hase / Nolan Seegert	Injury (Yu)	
Ice dance	July 18	(South Korea) Yura Min / Alexander Gamelin	September 7	(United Kingdom) Robynne Tweedale / Joseph Buckland	Min & Gamelin split.	
Ladies	August 9	(Slovakia) Nicole Rajičová	August 16	(Canada) Alaine Chartrand		
Men	August 15	(Belgium) Jorik Hendrickx	August 16	(Canada) Kevin Reynolds		
Men	—N/a		September 10	(United States) Jimmy Ma	Host picks	
Ladies	—N/a		September 10	(United States) Megan Wessenberg	Host picks	
Pairs	—N/a		September 10	(United States) Nica Digerness / Danny Neudecker	Host picks	
Ice dance	—N/a		September 10	(United States) Karina Manta / Joseph Johnson	Host picks	
Pairs	October 8	(China) Li Xiangning / Xie Zhong	October 9	(Canada) Evelyn Walsh / Trennt Michaud		
Ladies	October 15	(Russia) Elena Radionova	—N/a		Injury	

==== Skate Canada International ====
Discipline	Withdrew		Added		Notes	Ref.
Discipline	Date	Skater(s)	Date	Skater(s)	Notes	Ref.
Men	September 11	—N/a	September 11	(Canada) Nam Nguyen	Host pick	
Ladies	October 12	(Canada) Larkyn Austman	October 12	(Canada) Véronik Mallet	Injury; host pick	
Ladies	October 12	(Canada) Gabrielle Daleman	October 12	(Canada) Alicia Pineault	Focus on mental health; host pick	
Ladies	October 12	(South Korea) Choi Da-bin	October 16	(United States) Starr Andrews	Boot issues	
Ladies	October 25	(Canada) Véronik Mallet	October 25	—N/a	Injury	

==== Grand Prix of Helsinki ====
Discipline	Withdrew		Added		Notes	Ref.
Discipline	Date	Skater(s)	Date	Skater(s)	Notes	Ref.
Pairs	July 19	(Canada) Julianne Séguin / Charlie Bilodeau	August 10	(Japan) Miu Suzaki / Ryuichi Kihara	Séguin & Bilodeau split.	
Pairs	July 30	(China) Sui Wenjing / Han Cong	August 9	(China) Li Xiangning / Xie Zhong	Injury recovery (Sui)	
Pairs	—N/a		August 6	(United States) Deanna Stellato / Nathan Bartholomay	Host picks	
Ladies	August 9	(Slovakia) Nicole Rajičová	August 26	(Finland) Viveca Lindfors	Host picks	
Ice dance	August 15	(Czech Republic) Cortney Mansour / Michal Češka	August 16	(Germany) Shari Koch / Christian Nüchtern		
Men	August 15	(Belgium) Jorik Hendrickx	August 31	(South Korea) Cha Jun-hwan		
Men	—N/a		August 25	(Finland) Valtter Virtanen	Host picks	
Ice dance	—N/a		August 28	(Finland) Juulia Turkkila / Matthias Versluis	Host picks	
Ladies	—N/a		September 21	(Finland) Emmi Peltonen	Host picks	
Ice dance	September 21	(Finland) Cecilia Törn / Jussiville Partanen	September 21	(Italy) Jasmine Tessari / Francesco Fioretti	Host picks	
Pairs	October 8	(China) Li Xiangning / Xie Zhong	October 9	(Spain) Laura Barquero / Aritz Maestu		
Ladies	October 15	(United States) Karen Chen	October 16	(United States) Angela Wang	Injury recovery	
Ice dance	October 16	(United States) Madison Chock / Evan Bates	October 18	(Germany) Katharina Müller / Tim Dieck	Injury recovery (Chock)	
Ladies	October 20	(Italy) Carolina Kostner	October 23	(South Korea) Kim Ha-nul	Injury	
Men	October 29	(Russia) Alexey Erokhov	—N/a			
Ladies	October 29	(Germany) Nicole Schott	—N/a			

==== NHK Trophy ====
Discipline	Withdrew		Added		Notes	Ref.
Discipline	Date	Skater(s)	Date	Skater(s)	Notes	Ref.
Pairs	July 30	(China) Sui Wenjing / Han Cong	August 6	(United States) Audrey Lu / Misha Mitrofanov	Injury recovery (Sui)	
Ice dance	August 9	(Japan) Kana Muramoto / Chris Reed	August 31	(United Kingdom) Lilah Fear / Lewis Gibson	Muramoto & Reed split.	
Men	—N/a		September 3	(Japan) Sōta Yamamoto	Host picks	
Ladies	—N/a		September 3	(Japan) Rika Kihira	Host picks	
Ladies	October 8	(China) Li Xiangning	October 11	(France) Maé-Bérénice Méité		
Ladies	October 12	(South Korea) Choi Da-bin	October 17	(South Korea) Lim Eun-soo	Boot issues	
Ladies	October 26	(Russia) Elena Radionova	October 29	(Russia) Alena Leonova	Injury	
Ladies	October 29	(Canada) Gabrielle Daleman	October 30	(Australia) Kailani Craine	Focus on mental health	
Pairs	November 1	(Germany) Annika Hocke / Ruben Blommaert	November 1	(Spain) Laura Barquero / Aritz Maestu		
Ice dance	November 6	(France) Gabriella Papadakis / Guillaume Cizeron	—N/a		Injury (Cizeron)	

==== Rostelecom Cup ====
Discipline	Withdrew		Added		Notes	Ref.
Discipline	Date	Skater(s)	Date	Skater(s)	Notes	Ref.
Ice dance	June 29	(Armenia) Tina Garabedian / Simon Proulx-Sénécal	August 28	(Lithuania) Allison Reed / Saulius Ambrulevičius	Garabedian & Proulx-Sénécal split.	
Men	July 16	(Italy) Maurizio Zandron	August 10	(Australia) Brendan Kerry	Nationality change	
Men	July 19	(Kazakhstan) Denis Ten	August 28	(Malaysia) Julian Zhi Jie Yee	Death	
Ice dance	August 9	(Japan) Kana Muramoto / Chris Reed	August 28	(Japan) Misato Komatsubara / Tim Koleto	Muramoto & Reed split.	
Ladies	—N/a		September 18	(Russia) Sofia Samodurova	Host picks	
Ice dance	—N/a		September 18	(Russia) Annabelle Morozov / Andrei Bagin	Host picks	
Ladies	November 7	(Japan) Wakaba Higuchi	November 8	(Japan) Yuna Shiraiwa	Injury	
Ice dance	November 8	(United States) Madison Chock / Evan Bates	—N/a		Injury recovery (Chock)	
Ladies	November 12	(United States) Karen Chen	—N/a		Injury recovery	
Men	November 13	(Russia) Alexey Erokhov	November 13	(Russia) Andrei Lazukin	Host pick	
Ladies	November 13	(Germany) Nicole Schott	—N/a			

==== Internationaux de France ====
Discipline	Withdrew		Added		Notes	Ref.
Discipline	Date	Skater(s)	Date	Skater(s)	Notes	Ref.
Pairs	July 9	(China) Yu Xiaoyu / Zhang Hao	July 31	(Germany) Minerva Fabienne Hase / Nolan Seegert	Injury (Yu)	
Pairs	July 19	(Canada) Julianne Séguin / Charlie Bilodeau	August 2	(Canada) Camille Ruest / Andrew Wolfe	Séguin & Bilodeau split.	
Pairs	July 27	(France) Lola Esbrat / Andrei Novoselov	September 28	(United States) Audrey Lu / Misha Mitrofanov	Esbrat & Novoselov split; host picks	
Men	—N/a		September 14	(France) Kévin Aymoz	Host picks	
Ladies	—N/a		September 14	(France) Léa Serna	Host picks	
Ice dance	—N/a		September 14	(France) Adelina Galyavieva / Louis Thauron	Host picks	
Ladies	October 20	(Italy) Carolina Kostner	October 24	(Switzerland) Alexia Paganini	Injury	
Pairs	November 14	(United States) Haven Denney / Brandon Frazier	—N/a			
Men	November 15	(France) Chafik Besseghier	—N/a			

== Medal summary ==
Event	Discipline	Gold	Silver	Bronze
(United States) Skate America	Men	(United States) Nathan Chen	(Czech Republic) Michal Březina	(Russia) Sergei Voronov
(United States) Skate America	Ladies	(Japan) Satoko Miyahara	(Japan) Kaori Sakamoto	(Russia) Sofia Samodurova
(United States) Skate America	Pairs	(Russia) Evgenia Tarasova / Vladimir Morozov	(Russia) Alisa Efimova / Alexander Korovin	(United States) Ashley Cain / Timothy LeDuc
(United States) Skate America	Ice dance	(United States) Madison Hubbell / Zachary Donohue	(Italy) Charlène Guignard / Marco Fabbri	(Russia) Tiffany Zahorski / Jonathan Guerreiro

Event	Discipline	Gold	Silver	Bronze
Skate Canada International	Men	(Japan) Shoma Uno	(Canada) Keegan Messing	(South Korea) Cha Jun-hwan
Skate Canada International	Ladies	(Russia) Elizaveta Tuktamysheva	(Japan) Mako Yamashita	(Russia) Evgenia Medvedeva
Skate Canada International	Pairs	(France) Vanessa James / Morgan Ciprès	(China) Peng Cheng / Jin Yang	(Canada) Kirsten Moore-Towers / Michael Marinaro
Skate Canada International	Ice dance	(United States) Madison Hubbell / Zachary Donohue	(Russia) Victoria Sinitsina / Nikita Katsalapov	(Canada) Piper Gilles / Paul Poirier

Event	Discipline	Gold	Silver	Bronze
(Finland) Grand Prix of Helsinki	Men	(Japan) Yuzuru Hanyu	(Czech Republic) Michal Březina	(South Korea) Cha Jun-hwan
(Finland) Grand Prix of Helsinki	Ladies	(Russia) Alina Zagitova	(Russia) Stanislava Konstantinova	(Japan) Kaori Sakamoto
(Finland) Grand Prix of Helsinki	Pairs	(Russia) Natalia Zabiiako / Alexander Enbert	(Italy) Nicole Della Monica / Matteo Guarise	(Russia) Daria Pavliuchenko / Denis Khodykin
(Finland) Grand Prix of Helsinki	Ice dance	(Russia) Alexandra Stepanova / Ivan Bukin	(Italy) Charlène Guignard / Marco Fabbri	(United States) Lorraine McNamara / Quinn Carpenter

Event	Discipline	Gold	Silver	Bronze
(Japan) NHK Trophy	Men	(Japan) Shoma Uno	(Russia) Sergei Voronov	(Italy) Matteo Rizzo
(Japan) NHK Trophy	Ladies	(Japan) Rika Kihira	(Japan) Satoko Miyahara	(Russia) Elizaveta Tuktamysheva
(Japan) NHK Trophy	Pairs	(Russia) Natalia Zabiiako / Alexander Enbert	(China) Peng Cheng / Jin Yang	(United States) Alexa Scimeca Knierim / Chris Knierim
(Japan) NHK Trophy	Ice dance	(United States) Kaitlin Hawayek / Jean-Luc Baker	(Russia) Tiffany Zahorski / Jonathan Guerreiro	(United States) Rachel Parsons / Michael Parsons

Event	Discipline	Gold	Silver	Bronze
(Russia) Rostelecom Cup	Men	(Japan) Yuzuru Hanyu	(Georgia (country)) Morisi Kvitelashvili	(Japan) Kazuki Tomono
(Russia) Rostelecom Cup	Ladies	(Russia) Alina Zagitova	(Russia) Sofia Samodurova	(South Korea) Lim Eun-soo
(Russia) Rostelecom Cup	Pairs	(Russia) Evgenia Tarasova / Vladimir Morozov	(Italy) Nicole Della Monica / Matteo Guarise	(Russia) Daria Pavliuchenko / Denis Khodykin
(Russia) Rostelecom Cup	Ice dance	(Russia) Alexandra Stepanova / Ivan Bukin	(Spain) Sara Hurtado / Kirill Khaliavin	(United States) Christina Carreira / Anthony Ponomarenko

Event	Discipline	Gold	Silver	Bronze
Internationaux de France	Men	(United States) Nathan Chen	(United States) Jason Brown	(Russia) Alexander Samarin
Internationaux de France	Ladies	(Japan) Rika Kihira	(Japan) Mai Mihara	(United States) Bradie Tennell
Internationaux de France	Pairs	(France) Vanessa James / Morgan Ciprès	(United States) Tarah Kayne / Danny O'Shea	(Russia) Aleksandra Boikova / Dmitrii Kozlovskii
Internationaux de France	Ice dance	(France) Gabriella Papadakis / Guillaume Cizeron	(Russia) Victoria Sinitsina / Nikita Katsalapov	(Canada) Piper Gilles / Paul Poirier

Event	Discipline	Gold	Silver	Bronze
(Canada) Grand Prix Final	Men	(United States) Nathan Chen	(Japan) Shoma Uno	(South Korea) Cha Jun-hwan
(Canada) Grand Prix Final	Ladies	(Japan) Rika Kihira	(Russia) Alina Zagitova	(Russia) Elizaveta Tuktamysheva
(Canada) Grand Prix Final	Pairs	(France) Vanessa James / Morgan Ciprès	(China) Peng Cheng / Jin Yang	(Russia) Evgenia Tarasova / Vladimir Morozov
(Canada) Grand Prix Final	Ice dance	(United States) Madison Hubbell / Zachary Donohue	(Russia) Victoria Sinitsina / Nikita Katsalapov	(Italy) Charlène Guignard / Marco Fabbri

=== Medal standings ===
Rank	Nation	Gold	Silver	Bronze	Total
1	Russia	9	9	11	29
2	Japan	8	5	2	15
3	United States	7	2	6	15
4	France	4	0	0	4
5	Italy	0	4	2	6
6	China	0	3	0	3
7	Czech Republic	0	2	0	2
8	Canada	0	1	3	4
9	Georgia	0	1	0	1
9	Spain	0	1	0	1
11	South Korea	0	0	4	4
Totals (11 entries)		28	28	28	84

== Qualification ==
At each event, skaters earned points toward qualifying for the Grand Prix Final. Following the sixth event, the top six highest-scoring skaters/teams advanced to the Final. The points earned per placement were as follows:

Placement	Singles	Pairs/Ice dance
1st	15	15
2nd	13	13
3rd	11	11
4th	9	9
5th	7	7
6th	5	5
7th	4	—N/a
8th	3	—N/a

There were originally seven tie-breakers in cases of a tie in overall points:

1. Highest placement at an event. If a skater placed 1st and 3rd, the tiebreaker is the 1st place, and that beats a skater who placed 2nd in both events.
2. Highest combined total scores in both events. If a skater earned 200 points at one event and 250 at a second, that skater would win in the second tie-break over a skater who earned 200 points at one event and 150 at another.
3. Participated in two events.
4. Highest combined scores in the free skating/free dancing portion of both events.
5. Highest individual score in the free skating/free dancing portion from one event.
6. Highest combined scores in the short program/short dance of both events.
7. Highest number of total participants at the events.

If a tie remained, it was considered unbreakable and the tied skaters all advanced to the Grand Prix Final.

=== Qualification standings ===
Pts.	Men	Ladies	Pairs	Ice dance
30	(Japan) Yuzuru Hanyu (Japan) Shoma Uno (United States) Nathan Chen	(Russia) Alina Zagitova (Japan) Rika Kihira	(France) Vanessa James / Morgan Ciprès (Russia) Evgenia Tarasova / Vladimir Morozov (Russia) Natalia Zabiiako / Alexander Enbert	(United States) Madison Hubbell / Zachary Donohue (Russia) Alexandra Stepanova / Ivan Bukin
28	—N/a	(Japan) Satoko Miyahara	—N/a	
26	(Czech Republic) Michal Březina	(Russia) Elizaveta Tuktamysheva	(China) Peng Cheng / Jin Yang (Italy) Nicole Della Monica / Matteo Guarise	(Russia) Victoria Sinitsina / Nikita Katsalapov (Italy) Charlène Guignard / Marco Fabbri
24	(Russia) Sergei Voronov	(Japan) Kaori Sakamoto (Russia) Sofia Samodurova	—N/a	(United States) Kaitlin Hawayek / Jean-Luc Baker (Russia) Tiffany Zahorski / Jonathan Guerreiro
22	(South Korea) Cha Jun-hwan	(Japan) Mai Mihara	(Russia) Daria Pavliuchenko / Denis Khodykin	(Spain) Sara Hurtado / Kirill Khaliavin (Canada) Piper Gilles / Paul Poirier
20	(Canada) Keegan Messing (Russia) Alexander Samarin (Italy) Matteo Rizzo	(Russia) Stanislava Konstantinova (Russia) Evgenia Medvedeva (United States) Bradie Tennell	(Russia) Alisa Efimova / Alexander Korovin (United States) Tarah Kayne / Danny O'Shea (Canada) Kirsten Moore-Towers / Michael Marinaro (Russia) Aleksandra Boikova / Dmitrii Kozlovskii (United States) Alexa Scimeca Knierim / Chris Knierim	(United States) Lorraine McNamara / Quinn Carpenter
18	(United States) Jason Brown (Russia) Mikhail Kolyada	—N/a	(Austria) Miriam Ziegler / Severin Kiefer	(United States) Rachel Parsons / Michael Parsons (United States) Christina Carreira / Anthony Ponomarenko
17	—N/a	(Japan) Mako Yamashita	—N/a	
16	(Georgia (country)) Morisi Kvitelashvili (Russia) Dmitri Aliev (United States) Vincent Zhou	(South Korea) Lim Eun-soo (United States) Mariah Bell (Japan) Yuna Shiraiwa	(United States) Ashley Cain / Timothy LeDuc (North Korea) Ryom Tae-ok / Kim Ju-sik	(United Kingdom) Lilah Fear / Lewis Gibson
15	—N/a			(France) Gabriella Papadakis / Guillaume Cizeron
14	—N/a			(France) Marie-Jade Lauriault / Romain Le Gac
12	(Canada) Nam Nguyen	(Kazakhstan) Elizabet Tursynbaeva	—N/a	(Poland) Natalia Kaliszek / Maksym Spodyriev
11	(Japan) Kazuki Tomono (France) Kévin Aymoz	—N/a	—N/a	—N/a
10	—N/a	—N/a	—N/a	(China) Wang Shiyue / Liu Xinyu
9	(Russia) Andrei Lazukin	(Switzerland) Alexia Paganini	—N/a	(Russia) Sofia Evdokimova / Egor Bazin
8	—N/a	(Japan) Marin Honda	—N/a	—N/a
7	(China) Jin Boyang (United States) Alexei Krasnozhon (Latvia) Deniss Vasiļjevs	(France) Laurine Lecavelier (Belgium) Loena Hendrickx (Russia) Polina Tsurskaya	(Canada) Camille Ruest / Andrew Wolfe (Germany) Minerva Fabienne Hase / Nolan Seegert (Canada) Evelyn Walsh / Trennt Michaud	(Spain) Olivia Smart / Adrián Díaz (Canada) Carolane Soucisse / Shane Firus
6	(Japan) Keiji Tanaka	—N/a		
5	(France) Romain Ponsart (Germany) Paul Fentz (Japan) Sōta Yamamoto	(Russia) Daria Panenkova (Japan) Wakaba Higuchi (United States) Megan Wessenberg	(Spain) Laura Barquero / Aritz Maestu (United States) Audrey Lu / Misha Mitrofanov (United States) Haven Denney / Brandon Frazier (United States) Deanna Stellato / Nathan Bartholomay (United States) Nica Digerness / Danny Neudecker	(Lithuania) Allison Reed / Saulius Ambrulevičius (Finland) Juulia Turkkila / Matthias Versluis
4	(Malaysia) Julian Zhi Jie Yee (United States) Alexander Johnson	(Russia) Maria Sotskova (United States) Starr Andrews (Russia) Alena Leonova (South Korea) Kim Ha-nul	—N/a	
3	(Israel) Daniel Samohin	(France) Maé-Bérénice Méité (Canada) Alaine Chartrand (United States) Courtney Hicks (Finland) Viveca Lindfors	—N/a	

=== Qualifiers ===
No.	Men	Ladies	Pairs	Ice dance
1	(Japan) ~~Yuzuru Hanyu~~ (withdrew)	(Russia) Alina Zagitova	(France) Vanessa James / Morgan Ciprès	(United States) Madison Hubbell / Zachary Donohue
2	(Japan) Shoma Uno	(Japan) Rika Kihira	(Russia) Evgenia Tarasova / Vladimir Morozov	(Russia) Alexandra Stepanova / Ivan Bukin
3	(United States) Nathan Chen	(Japan) Satoko Miyahara	(Russia) Natalia Zabiiako / Alexander Enbert	(Russia) Victoria Sinitsina / Nikita Katsalapov
4	(Czech Republic) Michal Březina	(Russia) Elizaveta Tuktamysheva	(China) Peng Cheng / Jin Yang	(Italy) Charlène Guignard / Marco Fabbri
5	(Russia) Sergei Voronov	(Japan) Kaori Sakamoto	(Italy) Nicole Della Monica / Matteo Guarise	(United States) Kaitlin Hawayek / Jean-Luc Baker
6	(South Korea) Cha Jun-hwan	(Russia) Sofia Samodurova	(Russia) Daria Pavliuchenko / Denis Khodykin	(Russia) Tiffany Zahorski / Jonathan Guerreiro

Alternates

No.	Men	Ladies	Pairs	Ice dance
1	(Canada) Keegan Messing (called up)	(Japan) Mai Mihara	(Russia) Alisa Efimova / Alexander Korovin	(Spain) Sara Hurtado / Kirill Khaliavin
2	(Russia) Alexander Samarin	(Russia) Stanislava Konstantinova	(United States) Tarah Kayne / Danny O'Shea	(Canada) Piper Gilles / Paul Poirier
3	(Italy) Matteo Rizzo	(Russia) Evgenia Medvedeva	(Canada) Kirsten Moore-Towers / Michael Marinaro	(United States) Lorraine McNamara / Quinn Carpenter

== Top scores ==
=== Men's singles ===
Top 10 best scores in the men's combined total
No.	Skater	Nation	Score	Event
1	Yuzuru Hanyu	Japan	297.12	2018 Grand Prix of Helsinki
2	Nathan Chen	United States	282.42	2018–19 Grand Prix Final
3	Shoma Uno	Japan	277.25	2018 Skate Canada International
4	Keegan Messing	Canada	265.17	2018 Skate Canada International
5	Cha Jun-hwan	South Korea	263.49	2018–19 Grand Prix Final
6	Michal Březina	Czech Republic	257.98	2018 Grand Prix of Helsinki
7	Jason Brown	United States	256.33	2018 Internationaux de France
8	Sergei Voronov	Russia	254.28	2018 NHK Trophy
9	Alexander Samarin	Russia	248.78	2018 Skate Canada International
10	Morisi Kvitelashvili	Georgia	248.58	2018 Rostelecom Cup

Top 10 best scores in the men's short program
No.	Skater	Nation	Score	Event
1	Yuzuru Hanyu	Japan	110.53	2018 Rostelecom Cup
2	Jason Brown	United States	96.41	2018 Internationaux de France
3	Keegan Messing	Canada	95.05	2018 Skate Canada International
4	Michal Březina	Czech Republic	93.31	2018 Grand Prix of Helsinki
5	Nathan Chen	United States	92.99	2018–19 Grand Prix Final
6	Shoma Uno	Japan	92.49	2018 NHK Trophy
7	Sergei Voronov	Russia	91.37	2018 NHK Trophy
8	Alexander Samarin	Russia	90.86	2018 Internationaux de France
9	Morisi Kvitelashvili	Georgia	89.94	2018 Rostelecom Cup
10	Cha Jun-hwan	South Korea	89.07	2018–19 Grand Prix Final

Top 10 best scores in the men's free skating
No.	Skater	Nation	Score	Event
1	Yuzuru Hanyu	Japan	190.43	2018 Grand Prix of Helsinki
2	Nathan Chen	United States	189.99	2018 Skate America
3	Shoma Uno	Japan	188.38	2018 Skate Canada International
4	Cha Jun-hwan	South Korea	174.42	2018–19 Grand Prix Final
5	Keegan Messing	Canada	170.12	2018 Skate Canada International
6	Michal Březina	Czech Republic	166.05	2018–19 Grand Prix Final
7	Sergei Voronov	Russia	162.91	2018 NHK Trophy
8	Dmitri Aliev	Russia	162.67	2018 Internationaux de France
9	Alexander Samarin	Russia	160.72	2018 Skate Canada International
10	Jason Brown	United States	159.92	2018 Internationaux de France

=== Ladies' singles ===
Top 10 best scores in the ladies' combined total
No.	Skater	Nation	Score	Event
1	Rika Kihira	Japan	233.12	2018–19 Grand Prix Final
2	Alina Zagitova	Russia	226.53	2018–19 Grand Prix Final
3	Satoko Miyahara	Japan	219.71	2018 Skate America
4	Elizaveta Tuktamysheva	Russia	219.02	2018 NHK Trophy
5	Kaori Sakamoto	Japan	213.90	2018 Skate America
6	Sofia Samodurova	Russia	204.33	2018–19 Grand Prix Final
7	Mai Mihara	Japan	204.20	2018 NHK Trophy
8	Mako Yamashita	Japan	203.06	2018 Skate Canada International
9	Mariah Bell	United States	198.96	2018 NHK Trophy
10	Evgenia Medvedeva	Russia	197.91	2018 Skate Canada International

Top 10 best scores in the ladies' short program
No.	Skater	Nation	Score	Event
1	Rika Kihira	Japan	82.51	2018–19 Grand Prix Final
2	Alina Zagitova	Russia	80.78	2018 Rostelecom Cup
3	Elizaveta Tuktamysheva	Russia	76.17	2018 NHK Trophy
4	Satoko Miyahara	Japan	76.08	2018 NHK Trophy
5	Kaori Sakamoto	Japan	71.29	2018 Skate America
6	Mai Mihara	Japan	70.38	2018 NHK Trophy
7	Lim Eun-soo	South Korea	69.78	2018 NHK Trophy
8	Sofia Samodurova	Russia	68.24	2018–19 Grand Prix Final
9	Alena Leonova	Russia	68.22	2018 NHK Trophy
10	Evgenia Medvedeva	Russia	67.55	2018 Internationaux de France

Top 10 best scores in the ladies' free skating
No.	Skater	Nation	Score	Event
1	Rika Kihira	Japan	154.72	2018 NHK Trophy
2	Alina Zagitova	Russia	148.60	2018–19 Grand Prix Final
3	Satoko Miyahara	Japan	145.85	2018 Skate America
4	Elizaveta Tuktamysheva	Russia	144.67	2018–19 Grand Prix Final
5	Kaori Sakamoto	Japan	142.61	2018 Skate America
6	Evgenia Medvedeva	Russia	137.08	2018 Skate Canada International
7	Mako Yamashita	Japan	136.76	2018 Skate Canada International
8	Bradie Tennell	United States	136.44	2018 Internationaux de France
9	Sofia Samodurova	Russia	136.09	2018–19 Grand Prix Final
10	Mariah Bell	United States	135.99	2018 NHK Trophy

=== Pairs ===
Top 10 best scores in the pairs' combined total
No.	Team	Nation	Score	Event
1	Vanessa James / Morgan Ciprès	France	221.81	2018 Skate Canada International
2	Evgenia Tarasova / Vladimir Morozov	Russia	220.25	2018 Rostelecom Cup
3	Peng Cheng / Jin Yang	China	216.90	2018–19 Grand Prix Final
4	Natalia Zabiiako / Alexander Enbert	Russia	214.14	2018 NHK Trophy
5	Nicole Della Monica / Matteo Guarise	Italy	203.83	2018 Rostelecom Cup
6	Kirsten Moore-Towers / Michael Marinaro	Canada	200.93	2018 Skate Canada International
7	Aleksandra Boikova / Dmitrii Kozlovskii	Russia	196.54	2018 Skate Canada International
8	Tarah Kayne / Danny O'Shea	United States	191.43	2018 Internationaux de France
9	Alexa Scimeca Knierim / Chris Knierim	United States	190.49	2018 NHK Trophy
10	Daria Pavliuchenko / Denis Khodykin	Russia	190.01	2018 Rostelecom Cup

Top 10 best scores in the pairs' short program
No.	Team	Nation	Score	Event
1	Evgenia Tarasova / Vladimir Morozov	Russia	78.47	2018 Rostelecom Cup
2	Peng Cheng / Jin Yang	China	75.69	2018–19 Grand Prix Final
3	Natalia Zabiiako / Alexander Enbert	Russia	75.18	2018–19 Grand Prix Final
4	Vanessa James / Morgan Ciprès	France	74.51	2018 Skate Canada International
5	Nicole Della Monica / Matteo Guarise	Italy	72.32	2018 Rostelecom Cup
6	Kirsten Moore-Towers / Michael Marinaro	Canada	71.26	2018 Skate Canada International
7	Daria Pavliuchenko / Denis Khodykin	Russia	69.38	2018 Rostelecom Cup
8	Aleksandra Boikova / Dmitrii Kozlovskii	France	68.83	2018 Internationaux de France
9	Ryom Tae-ok / Kim Ju-sik	North Korea	67.18	2018 Internationaux de France
10	Alisa Efimova / Alexander Korovin	Russia	65.46	2018 Rostelecom Cup

Top 10 best scores in the pairs' free skating
No.	Team	Nation	Score	Event
1	Vanessa James / Morgan Ciprès	France	148.37	2018–19 Grand Prix Final
2	Evgenia Tarasova / Vladimir Morozov	Russia	141.78	2018 Rostelecom Cup
3	Peng Cheng / Jin Yang	China	141.21	2018–19 Grand Prix Final
4	Natalia Zabiiako / Alexander Enbert	Russia	140.66	2018 NHK Trophy
5	Aleksandra Boikova / Dmitrii Kozlovskii	Russia	131.97	2018 Skate Canada International
6	Nicole Della Monica / Matteo Guarise	Italy	131.51	2018 Rostelecom Cup
7	Kirsten Moore-Towers / Michael Marinaro	Canada	129.67	2018 Skate Canada International
8	Tarah Kayne / Danny O'Shea	United States	127.98	2018 Internationaux de France
9	Alexa Scimeca Knierim / Chris Knierim	United States	125.74	2018 NHK Trophy
10	Daria Pavliuchenko / Denis Khodykin	Russia	125.57	2018–19 Grand Prix Final

=== Ice dance ===
Top 10 best scores in the combined total (ice dance)
No.	Team	Nation	Score	Event
1	Gabriella Papadakis / Guillaume Cizeron	France	216.78	2018 Internationaux de France
2	Madison Hubbell / Zachary Donohue	United States	205.35	2018–19 Grand Prix Final
3	Victoria Sinitsina / Nikita Katsalapov	Russia	201.37	2018–19 Grand Prix Final
4	Alexandra Stepanova / Ivan Bukin	Russia	200.09	2018 Grand Prix of Helsinki
5	Charlène Guignard / Marco Fabbri	Italy	198.65	2018–19 Grand Prix Final
6	Piper Gilles / Paul Poirier	Canada	188.74	2018 Internationaux de France
7	Kaitlin Hawayek / Jean-Luc Baker	United States	184.63	2018 NHK Trophy
8	Tiffany Zahorski / Jonathan Guerreiro	Russia	184.37	2018–19 Grand Prix Final
9	Lorraine McNamara / Quinn Carpenter	United States	180.57	2018 Skate America
10	Marie-Jade Lauriault / Romain Le Gac	France	180.32	2018 Skate Canada International

Top 10 best scores in the rhythm dance
No.	Team	Nation	Score	Event
1	Gabriella Papadakis / Guillaume Cizeron	France	84.13	2018 Internationaux de France
2	Madison Hubbell / Zachary Donohue	United States	80.53	2018–19 Grand Prix Final
3	Charlène Guignard / Marco Fabbri	Italy	78.30	2018–19 Grand Prix Final
4	Alexandra Stepanova / Ivan Bukin	Russia	78.18	2018 Grand Prix of Helsinki
5	Victoria Sinitsina / Nikita Katsalapov	Russia	77.91	2018 Internationaux de France
6	Tiffany Zahorski / Jonathan Guerreiro	Russia	75.49	2018 NHK Trophy
7	Piper Gilles / Paul Poirier	Canada	74.25	2018 Internationaux de France
8	Lorraine McNamara / Quinn Carpenter	United States	72.44	2018 Skate America
9	Olivia Smart / Adrián Díaz	Spain	72.35	2018 Skate Canada International
10	Kaitlin Hawayek / Jean-Luc Baker	United States	71.33	2018–19 Grand Prix Final

Top 10 best scores in the free dance
No.	Team	Nation	Score	Event
1	Gabriella Papadakis / Guillaume Cizeron	France	132.65	2018 Internationaux de France
2	Alexandra Stepanova / Ivan Bukin	Russia	124.94	2018 Rostelecom Cup
3	Madison Hubbell / Zachary Donohue	United States	124.82	2018–19 Grand Prix Final
4	Victoria Sinitsina / Nikita Katsalapov	Russia	124.04	2018–19 Grand Prix Final
5	Charlène Guignard / Marco Fabbri	Italy	120.35	2018–19 Grand Prix Final
6	Piper Gilles / Paul Poirier	Canada	120.02	2018 Skate Canada International
7	Kaitlin Hawayek / Jean-Luc Baker	United States	113.92	2018 NHK Trophy
8	Lilah Fear / Lewis Gibson	Great Britain	113.29	2018 NHK Trophy
9	Marie-Jade Lauriault / Romain Le Gac	France	111.42	2018 Skate Canada International
10	Tiffany Zahorski / Jonathan Guerreiro	Russia	111.39	2018–19 Grand Prix Final
