= 2018 Rostelecom Cup =

Figure skating competition

- Type: Grand Prix
- Date: November 16 – 18
- Season: 2018-19
- Location: Moscow
- Host: Figure Skating Federation of Russia
- Venue: Megasport Arena

Champions
- Men's singles: (Japan) Yuzuru Hanyu
- Ladies' singles: (Russia) Alina Zagitova
- Pairs: (Russia) Evgenia Tarasova / Vladimir Morozov
- Ice dance: (Russia) Alexandra Stepanova / Ivan Bukin
- Previous: 2017 Rostelecom Cup
- Next: 2019 Rostelecom Cup
- Previous Grand Prix: 2018 NHK Trophy
- Next Grand Prix: 2018 Internationaux de France

The 2018 Rostelecom Cup was the fifth event of six in the 2018–19 ISU Grand Prix of Figure Skating, a senior-level international invitational competition series. It was held on November 16–18, 2018 in Moscow, Russia. Medals were awarded in the disciplines of men's singles, ladies' singles, pair skating, and ice dancing. Skaters earned points toward qualifying for the 2018–19 Grand Prix Final.

== Entries ==
The ISU published the preliminary assignments on June 29, 2018.

Country	Men	Ladies	Pairs	Ice dancing
Australia	Brendan Kerry		Ekaterina Alexandrovskaya / Harley Windsor	
Austria			Miriam Ziegler / Severin Kiefer	
Canada	Keegan Messing			
Georgia	Morisi Kvitelashvili			
Germany	Paul Fentz			
Hungary				Anna Yanovskaya / Ádám Lukács
Italy			Nicole Della Monica / Matteo Guarise	
Japan	Yuzuru Hanyu; Kazuki Tomono	Yura Matsuda; Mako Yamashita; Yuna Shiraiwa		Misato Komatsubara / Tim Koleto
Kazakhstan		Elizabet Tursynbaeva		
Lithuania				Allison Reed / Saulius Ambrulevičius
Malaysia	Julian Zhi Jie Yee			
Poland				Natalia Kaliszek / Maksym Spodyriev
Russia	Artur Dmitriev; Mikhail Kolyada; Andrei Lazukin	Sofia Samodurova; Polina Tsurskaya; Alina Zagitova	Alisa Efimova / Alexander Korovin; Daria Pavliuchenko / Denis Khodykin; Evgenia Tarasova / Vladimir Morozov	Sofia Evdokimova / Egor Bazin; Annabelle Morozov / Andrei Bagin; Alexandra Stepanova / Ivan Bukin
South Korea		Lim Eun-soo		
Spain				Sara Hurtado / Kirill Khaliavin
Sweden	Alexander Majorov			
Switzerland		Alexia Paganini		
United States	Alexei Krasnozhon	Gracie Gold	Ashley Cain / Timothy LeDuc; Deanna Stellato / Nathan Bartholomay	Christina Carreira / Anthony Ponomarenko

=== Changes to preliminary assignments ===
Date	Discipline	Withdrew	Added	Reason/Other notes	Refs
June 29 and August 28	Ice dance	(Armenia) Tina Garabedian / Simon Proulx-Sénécal	(Lithuania) Allison Reed / Saulius Ambrulevičius	Split	
July 16 and August 10	Men	(Italy) Maurizio Zandron	(Australia) Brendan Kerry	Nationality change	
July 19 and August 28	Men	(Kazakhstan) Denis Ten	(Malaysia) Julian Zhi Jie Yee	Deceased	
August 9 and 28	Ice dance	(Japan) Kana Muramoto / Chris Reed	(Japan) Misato Komatsubara / Tim Koleto	Split	
September 18	Ladies	N/A	(Russia) Sofia Samodurova	Host pick	
September 18	Ice dance	N/A	(Russia) Annabelle Morozov / Andrei Bagin	Host pick	
November 7 and 8	Ladies	(Japan) Wakaba Higuchi	(Japan) Yuna Shiraiwa	Foot injury	
November 8	Ice dance	(United States) Madison Chock / Evan Bates	N/A	Injury recovery (Chock)	
November 12	Ladies	(United States) Karen Chen	N/A	Injury recovery	
November 13	Men	(Russia) Alexey Erokhov	(Russia) Andrei Lazukin	Host pick	
November 13	Ladies	(Germany) Nicole Schott	N/A		

== Records ==
The following new ISU best scores were set during this competition:

Event	Component	Skater(s)	Score	Date	Ref
Men	Short program	(Japan) Yuzuru Hanyu	110.53	16 November 2018	
Pairs	Short program	(Russia) Evgenia Tarasova / Vladimir Morozov	78.47	16 November 2018	
Ladies	Short program	(Russia) Alina Zagitova	80.78	16 November 2018	
Ice dance	Free dance	(Russia) Alexandra Stepanova / Ivan Bukin	124.94	17 November 2018	

== Results ==
=== Men ===
Yuzuru Hanyu set a new world record for the short program (110.53).

Rank	Name	Nation	Total points	SP		FS	
1	Yuzuru Hanyu	Japan	278.42	1	110.53	1	167.89
2	Morisi Kvitelashvili	Georgia	248.58	2	89.94	2	158.64
3	Kazuki Tomono	Japan	238.73	4	82.26	3	156.47
4	Mikhail Kolyada	Russia	225.42	8	69.10	4	156.32
5	Keegan Messing	Canada	220.75	7	73.83	6	146.92
6	Paul Fentz	Germany	220.57	5	78.28	7	142.29
7	Andrei Lazukin	Russia	215.78	11	62.45	5	153.33
8	Alexei Krasnozhon	United States	208.01	6	75.32	8	132.69
9	Alexander Majorov	Sweden	205.59	3	82.33	10	123.26
10	Brendan Kerry	Australia	197.59	10	65.22	9	132.37
11	Artur Dmitriev Jr.	Russia	189.58	9	67.58	11	122.00
12	Julian Yee	Malaysia	178.71	12	60.37	12	118.34

=== Ladies ===
Alina Zagitova set a new world record for the short program (80.78).

Rank	Name	Nation	Total points	SP		FS	
1	Alina Zagitova	Russia	222.95	1	80.78	1	142.17
2	Sofia Samodurova	Russia	198.01	2	67.40	2	130.61
3	Lim Eun-soo	South Korea	185.67	6	57.76	3	127.91
4	Alexia Paganini	Switzerland	182.50	3	63.43	5	119.07
5	Yuna Shiraiwa	Japan	180.93	5	60.35	4	120.58
6	Elizabet Tursynbaeva	Kazakhstan	180.45	4	61.73	6	118.72
7	Mako Yamashita	Japan	161.22	9	51.00	7	110.22
8	Polina Tsurskaya	Russia	149.45	7	56.81	8	92.64
9	Yura Matsuda	Japan	137.99	8	52.00	9	85.99
WD	Gracie Gold	United States	withdrew	10	37.51	withdrew from competition	

=== Pairs ===
Rank	Name	Nation	Total points	SP		FS	
1	Evgenia Tarasova / Vladimir Morozov	Russia	220.25	1	78.47	1	141.78
2	Nicole Della Monica / Matteo Guarise	Italy	203.83	2	72.32	2	131.51
3	Daria Pavliuchenko / Denis Khodykin	Russia	190.01	3	69.38	4	120.63
4	Miriam Ziegler / Severin Kiefer	Austria	187.01	5	63.75	3	123.26
5	Alisa Efimova / Alexander Korovin	Russia	181,62	4	65.46	5	116.16
6	Ashley Cain / Timothy LeDuc	United States	170.29	7	58.79	6	112.50
7	Ekaterina Alexandrovskaya / Harley Windsor	Australia	144.00	6	59.28	7	84.72
WD	Deanna Stellato-Dudek / Nathan Bartholomay	United States	withdrew	8	51.25	withdrew from competition	

=== Ice dancing ===
Rank	Name	Nation	Total points	RD		FD	
1	Alexandra Stepanova / Ivan Bukin	Russia	199.43	1	74.49	1	124.94
2	Sara Hurtado / Kirill Khaliavin	Spain	174.42	3	66.40	2	108.02
3	Christina Carreira / Anthony Ponomarenko	United States	174.21	2	69.01	3	105.20
4	Sofia Evdokimova / Egor Bazin	Russia	164.66	6	64.05	4	100.61
5	Natalia Kaliszek / Maksym Spodyriev	Poland	161.62	4	66.30	5	95.32
6	Allison Reed / Saulius Ambrulevičius	Lithuania	158.03	5	64.54	6	93.49
7	Anna Yanovskaya / Ádám Lukács	Hungary	148.13	7	54.83	7	93.30
8	Misato Komatsubara / Tim Koleto	Japan	143.28	8	52.99	8	90.29
9	Annabelle Morozov / Andrei Bagin	Russia	133.58	9	51.69	9	81.89
