= Annabelle Morozov =

Russian ice dancer (born 2001)

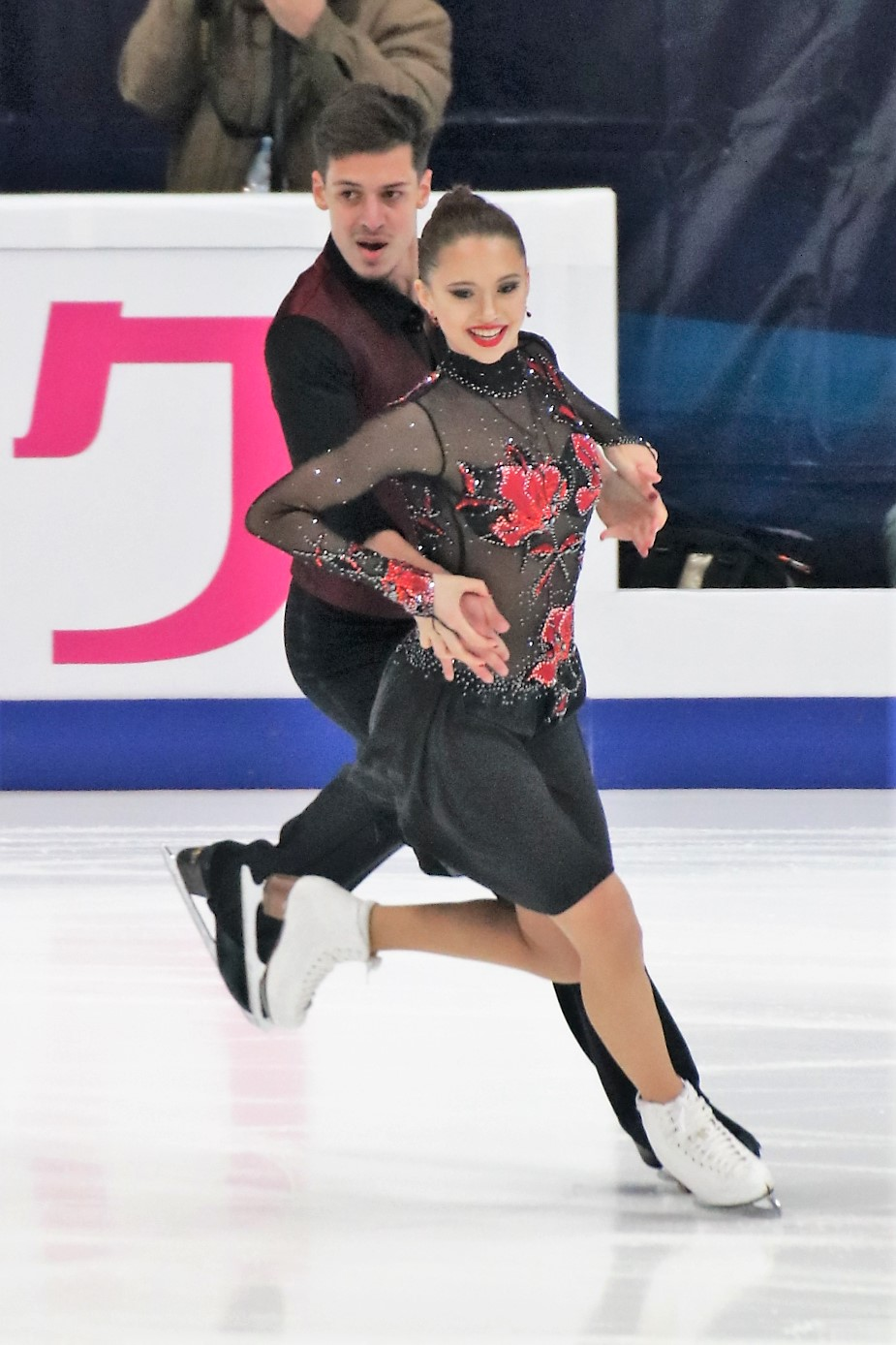
- Morozov/Bagin at the 2018 Rostelecom Cup

Personal information
- Native name: Аннабель Николь Морозов
- Full name: Annabelle Nicole Morozov
- Other names: Morozova
- Born: May 2, 2001 (age 25) Hartford, Connecticut, U.S.
- Home town: Fremont, California, U.S.
- Height: 1.67 m (5 ft 5 1/2 in)

Figure skating career
- Country: United States (2012–2016; from 2024); Russia (2017–2023); France (2015–2016)
- Discipline: Ice dance
- Partner: Jeffrey Chen (since 2024); Igor Eremenko (2023–24); Devid Naryzhnyy (2022–23); Andrei Bagin (2017–22)
- Coach: Charlie White; Tanith Belbin; Nikolai Morozov; Greg Zuerlein
- Skating club: SC of New York
- Began skating: 2006

Annabelle Nicole Morozov (Russian: Аннабель Николь Морозов/Аннабель Николаевна Морозова; born 2 May 2001) is an American ice dancer. With current skating partner, Jeffrey Chen, she is the 2024 Lombardia Trophy silver medalist.

With former skating partner, Andrei Bagin, she is the 2019 Golden Spin of Zagreb silver medalist.

== Personal life ==
Annabelle Morozov was born on 2 May 2001 in the United States to former competitive ice dancers Nikolai Morozov of Russia and Caroline Douarin of France. She lived in the U.S. and France throughout her childhood and holds American, French, and Russian citizenship. Morozov is fluent in English, French, and Russian. Her godparents are famed figure skating coach and commentator Tatiana Tarasova and 2002 Olympic champion Alexei Yagudin.

She married her former ice dance partner, Igor Eremenko, on May 16, 2023.

== Career ==
=== Early career ===
Morozov first began skating in 2006 and competed in ladies' singles for both the United States and France. She is the 2014 U.S. juvenile national silver medalist. During the 2015–16 season, Morozov competed at both domestic American and French competitions while representing France internationally at the 2016 Mentor Toruń Cup.

Morozov switched to competing for Russia in ice dance in 2016. She and her father and coach, Nikolai, made the decision while considering the depth of the Russian ladies field. While searching for a partner, Morozov worked with various ice dance coaches apart from her father, including Marina Zoueva, Igor Shpilband, and Alexander Zhulin.

=== Partnership with Bagin for Russia ===
==== 2017–2018 season ====
Morozov tried out with Andrei Bagin during her time at Alexander Zhulin's rink in August 2017, due to coincidental timing and without any prior planning. After receiving the approval of her coach, Morozov and Bagin began training under her father's tutelage. Morozov/Bagin debuted at the Russian national test skates in September, just one month after teaming up. The team qualified for the 2018 Russian Championships in their first season together and placed eighth. Their coach expressed satisfaction with their accomplishments in their debut season.

==== 2018–2019 season ====
Morozov/Bagin made their international and Grand Prix debut after being selected as the host pick for the 2018 Rostelecom Cup, where they finished ninth. They later competed on the 2018–19 ISU Challenger Series, finishing seventh at 2018 CS Tallinn Trophy and eighth at 2018 CS Golden Spin of Zagreb. Morozov/Bagin again finished eighth at the 2019 Russian Championships to end their season.

==== 2019–2020 season ====
Morozov/Bagin spent time working with Pasquale Camerlengo and Igor Shpilband in Detroit, Michigan and Ivan Volobuiev in Moscow throughout the season while retaining Morozov's father as their main coach. They opened their season at 2019 CS Ice Star, where they finished third in the rhythm dance and fourth in the free dance, to finish fourth overall. At their next event, 2019 CS Golden Spin of Zagreb, Morozov/Bagin finished second in both segments to win their first international medal, silver, behind Italy's Guignard/Fabbri and ahead of Green/Parsons of the United States. The team set personal bests in all three segments and surpassed their previous best total score by over 13 points.

Morozov/Bagin finished fourth at the 2020 Russian Championships, their highest placement at the event. As a result, they were selected as first alternates for the 2020 World Championships.

==== 2020–2021 season ====
Morozov/Bagin started the season at the senior Russian test skates. Competing on the domestic Cup of Russia series, they won silver in the first stage in Syzran and gold in the second stage in Moscow. They competed on the Grand Prix at the 2020 Rostelecom Cup, where they placed fourth in the rhythm dance. They dropped to fifth place after the free dance.

With defending national champions Sinitsina/Katsalapov sitting out the 2021 Russian Championships due to COVID-19 infection, the bronze medal position on the podium was widely perceived as a close contest among several teams, Morozov/Bagin among them. However, they performed poorly in the rhythm dance, with Bagin first stumbling in the Finnstep pattern dance segment, and then both falling in the step sequence. As a result, they placed seventh in the rhythm dance, 15.66 points behind fifth-place Shevchenko/Eremenko and 18.02 points behind Skoptcova/Aleshin in third. They placed third in the free dance, partly due to errors from teams ahead, but due to the wide deficit from the rhythm dance, they rose only to sixth place overall. Morozov said afterward that while it had been difficult to perform after such a difficult first day, "I just tried to forget about yesterday, and we are very pleased with how we performed today."

Following the national championships, Morozov/Bagin participated in the 2021 Channel One Trophy, a televised team competition held in lieu of the cancelled European Championships. They were selected for the Red Machine team captained by Alina Zagitova. They placed fourth in both their segments of the competition, while their team finished first overall.

==== 2021–2022 season ====
Morozov/Bagin had previously been contemplating a free dance based on Nikolai Rimsky-Korsakov's Scheherazade, but had put away the idea after the onset of the pandemic. They revived the concept for the 2021–22 season, Morozov noting that they hoped "the way we portray the characters and even costume-wise and movements" were "a little bit different" from the famous free dance of Americans Davis/Charlie White. They made their season debut at the 2021 Skate America, where they placed fifth. They went on to finish sixth at the 2021 Internationaux de France.

At the 2022 Russian Championships, Morozov/Bagin finished fourth, 0.10 points behind bronze medalists Khudaiberdieva/Bazin. The duo would part ways after the season concluded.

=== Partnership with Naryzhnyy for Russia ===
==== 2022–2023 season ====
Prior to the 2022–23 figure skating season, Morozov teamed up with Devid Naryzhnyy. Due to the Russian invasion of Ukraine in early 2022, all figure skaters representing Russia were banned from competing at international competitions.

Together, the duo took gold at the Russian Grand Prix stages in Moscow and Kazan. Despite their success, Morozov/Naryzhnyy would ultimately end their partnership prior to the 2023 Russian Championships.

=== Partnership with Eremenko ===
==== 2023–2024 season ====
Prior to the season, it was announced the Morozov had teamed up with later husband, Igor Eremenko. The pair would leave Russia on November 29, 2023, to train in the United States. They would ultimately end up not competing together and it became known that their partnership had ended in May 2024.

=== Partnership with Chen for the United States ===
==== 2024–2025 season ====
In May 2024, Morozov teamed up with American ice dancer, Jeffrey Chen to represent the United States with him. It was subsequently announced that they would be coached by Charlie White, Tanith Belbin, Nikolai Morozov, and Greg Zuerlein in Canton, Michigan.

In July, Morozov/Chen made their competitive debut at the Lake Placid Ice Dance International. They were with seventh after the rhythm dance and eleventh in the free dance, finishing in ninth place overall. They would go on to win their first medal together as an ice dance team, a silver at the 2024 CS Lombardia Trophy. Not initially assigned to compete on the 2024–25 Grand Prix circuit, Morozov/Chen were called up to compete at 2024 Skate America two days before the event to replace original host picks, Isabella Flores / Ivan Desyatov. It was later revealed that this was due to Desyatov being sanctioned with a temporary suspension by U.S. Center for SafeSport due to allegations of misconduct. At the event, Morozov/Chen came in ninth place.

In January, Morozov/Chen finished tenth at the 2025 U.S. Championships.

On February 19, 2025, the U.S. Center for SafeSport announced that Chen had been sanctioned with a temporary suspension due to allegations of misconduct.

== Programs ==
=== Ice dance with Jeffrey Chen (for the United States) ===
Season	Rhythm dance	Free dance	Exhibition
2024–2025	Get Up Offa That Thing; I Got You (I Feel Good) by James Brown; Shout by The Isley Brothers choreo. by Nikolai Morozov	Piano Concerto No. 2 by Sergei Rachmaninoff choreo. by Nikolai Morozov; Star Wars by John Williams choreo. by Nikolai Morozov	You Lost Me by Christina Aguilera

=== With Bagin ===
Season	Rhythm dance	Free dance	Exhibition
2021–2022	Blues: My Body is a Cage by Peter Gabriel; Hip Hop: Boom Boom Pow by Black Eyed Peas choreo. by Nikolai Morozov	Scheherazade by Nikolai Rimsky-Korsakov choreo. by Nikolai Morozov	
2020–2021	Foxtrot: Hot Honey Rag; Foxtrot: Funny Honey (from Chicago) performed by Renée Zellweger; Quickstep Sing, Sing, Sing (from Swing!) choreo. by Nikolai Morozov; Too Darn Hot (from Kiss Me, Kate) performed by James T. Lane, Corbin Bleu choreo. by Nikolai Morozov	Terra Rossa by Balázs Havasi choreo. by Nikolai Morozov	
2019–2020	Too Darn Hot (from Kiss Me, Kate) performed by James T. Lane, Corbin Bleu choreo. by Nikolai Morozov	Terra Rossa by Balázs Havasi choreo. by Nikolai Morozov	Romans (Ja Tebya Nikogda Ne Zabudu) by Ariana feat. Aleksandr Marshal
2018–2019	Tango: Volver by Maxime Rodriguez; Tango: Dos Tangos choreo. by Nikolai Morozov	Tosca: E lucevan le stelle performed by Michael Bolton; E lucevan le stelle – Execution and Finale performed by Neville Marriner choreo. by Nikolai Morozov	
2017–2018	Samba: Skip to the Bip; Rhumba: Falling into You by Celine Dion; Samba:	Les Misérables: Overture Work Song; I Dreamed a Dream performed by Susan Boyle; Do You Hear the People Sing?	

== Competitive highlights ==
GP: Grand Prix; CS: Challenger Series

=== Ice dance with Jeffrey Chen (for the United States) ===
International
Event	2024–25
U.S. Championships	10th
GP Skate America	9th
CS Lombardia Trophy	2nd
Lake Placid IDI	9th
TBD = Assigned; WD = Withdrew

=== Ice dance with David Naryzhnyy (for Russia) ===
National
Event	2022–23
Russian Champ.	WD
Grand Prix Kazan	1st
Grand Prix Moscow	1st
WD = Withdrew

=== Ice dance with Andrei Bagin (for Russia) ===
International
Event	17–18	18–19	19–20	20–21	21–22
GP France					6th
GP Rostelecom		9th		5th	
GP Skate America					5th
CS Golden Spin		8th	2nd		WD
CS Ice Star			4th		
CS Tallinn Trophy		7th			
National
Russian Champ.	8th	8th	4th	6th	4th
Russian Cup Final	1st	3rd		2nd	
WD = Withdrew

=== Single skating (for France) ===
International: Junior
Event	2015–16
Mentor Toruń Cup	8th
National
French Junior Champ.	6th

== Detailed results ==
Small medals for short and free programs awarded only at ISU Championships. At team events, medals awarded for team results only. ISU personal bests highlighted in bold.

=== Ice dance with Jeffrey Chen (for the United States) ===
==== Senior level ====
Results in the 2024–25 season
Date	Event	RD		FD		Total	
Date	Event	P	Score	P	Score	P	Score
Jul 30–31, 2024	(United States) 2024 Lake Placid Ice Dance International	17	66.78	11	96.96	9	163.74
Sep 12–15, 2024	(Italy) 2024 CS Lombardia Trophy	3	70.18	2	106.87	2	177.05
Oct 18–20, 2024	(United States) 2024 Skate America	9	66.57	9	100.16	9	166.73
Jan 20–26, 2025	(United States) 2025 U.S. Championships	10	70.64	11	102.90	10	173.54

=== With Bagin ===
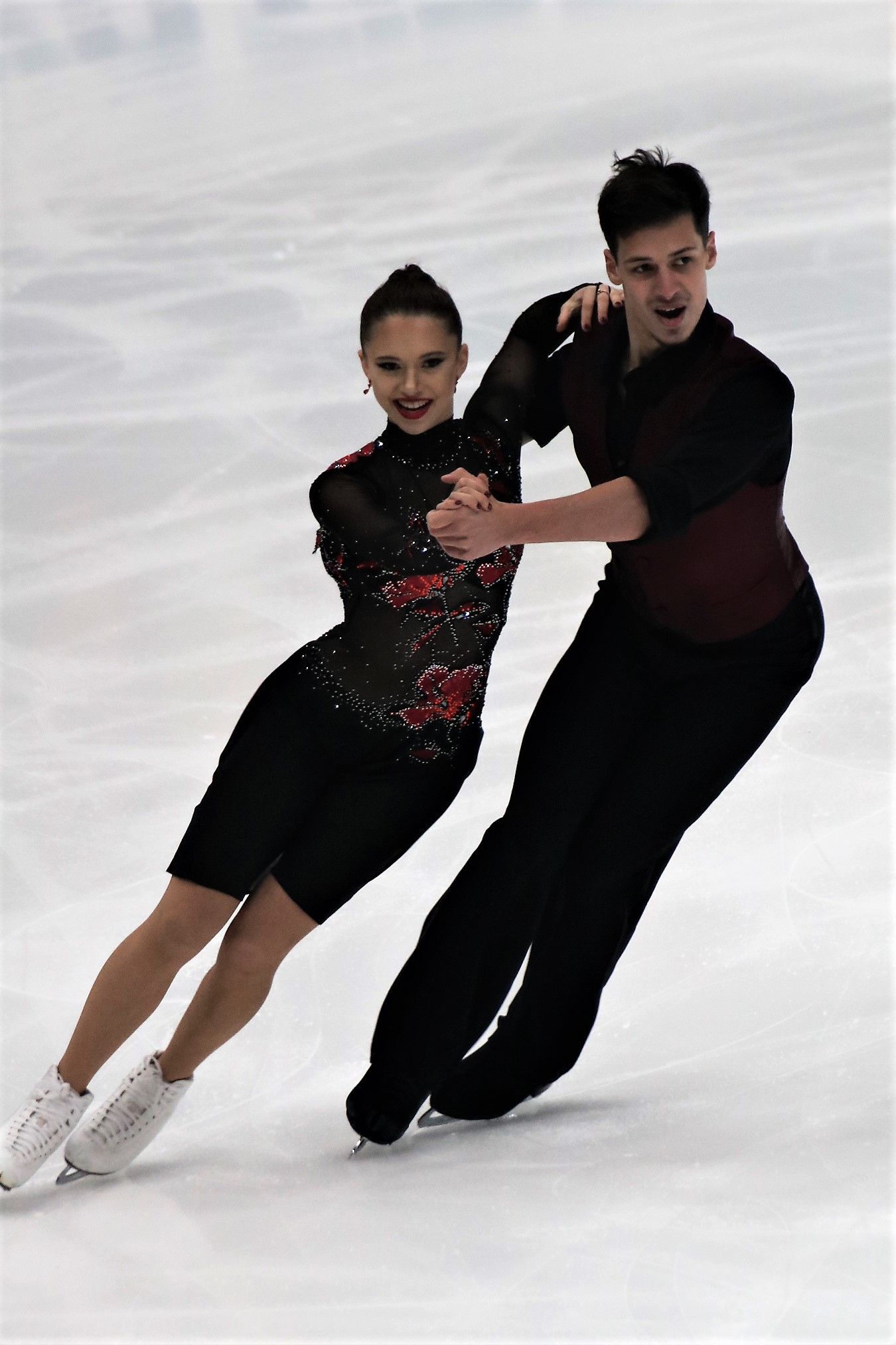
Morozov/Bagin at the 2018 Rostelecom Cup

**2021–22 season**
Date	Event	RD	FD	Total
December 21–26, 2021	2022 Russian Championships	5; 78.02	4; 117.63	4; 195.65
November 19–21, 2021	2021 Internationaux de France	6; 68.45	8; 103.87	6; 172.32
October 22–24, 2021	2021 Skate America	5; 68.79	5; 106.53	5; 175.32
**2020–21 season**
Date	Event	RD	FD	Total
Feb. 26– Mar. 2, 2021	2021 Russian Cup Final	2; 76.43	2; 125.86	2; 202.29
February 5–7, 2021	2021 Channel One Trophy	4; 80.54	4; 123.27	1T/4P; 203.81
December 23–27, 2020	2021 Russian Championships	7; 62.17	3; 120.69	6; 182.86
November 20–22, 2020	2020 Rostelecom Cup	4; 76.21	5; 114.79	5; 191.00
2019–20 season
Date	Event	RD	FD	Total
December 24–29, 2019	2020 Russian Championships	5; 73.67	4; 115.43	4; 189.10
December 4–7, 2019	2019 CS Golden Spin of Zagreb	2; **78.75**	2; **112.96**	2; **191.71**
October 18–20, 2019	2019 CS Ice Star	3; 75.25	4; 102.77	4; 178.02
2018–19 season
December 21–24, 2018	2019 Russian Championships	8; 65.95	8; 97.21	8; 163.16
December 5–8, 2018	2018 CS Golden Spin of Zagreb	10; 54.51	7; 97.04	8; 151.55
November 26–29, 2018	2018 CS Tallinn Trophy	7; 56.47	7; 91.53	7; 148.00
November 16–18, 2018	2018 Rostelecom Cup	9; 51.69	9; 81.89	9; 133.58
2017–18 season
December 19–24, 2017	2018 Russian Championships	9; 52.32	7; 85.54	8; 137.86
