= Harley Windsor =

Australian pair skater

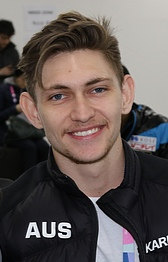
- Windsor in 2017

Personal information
- Full name: Harley Dahlstrom-Windsor
- Born: 22 October 1996 (age 30) Penrith, New South Wales, Australia
- Height: 1.85 m (6 ft 1 in)

Figure skating career
- Country: Australia
- Skating club: Sydney FSC
- Began skating: 2005
Medal record
Representing Australia
Figure skating: Pairs
World Junior Championships
Gold medal – first place	2017 Taipei	Pairs
Junior Grand Prix Final
Gold medal – first place	2017–18 Nagoya	Pairs

Harley Windsor (né Dahlstrom-Windsor; born 22 October 1996) is a former Australian pair skater. With his former skating partner, Ekaterina Alexandrovskaya, he was the 2017 Junior World Champion, the 2017 CS Tallinn Trophy champion, the 2017 CS Nebelhorn Trophy bronze medallist, the 2018 CS U.S. Classic bronze medallist and a two-time Australian national champion (2016, 2018).

== Early life ==
Harley Dahlstrom-Windsor was born on 22 October 1996 in Penrith, New South Wales, and was raised in Rooty Hill. The youngest child of Josie and Peter Dahlstrom, he has eight half-siblings from his parents' earlier marriages. He is of Australian Aboriginal heritage; His mother, raised near Gulargambone, has Weilwyn and Gamilaraay ancestry, and his father, from Moree, New South Wales, is of Gamilaraay, Ngarrable, and Swedish descent.

== Skating career ==
=== Early career ===
Windsor began skating in 2005 after an ice rink in Blacktown caught his interest. Galina and Andrei Pachin began coaching him in Canterbury in late 2006. After competing in singles, he began learning pairs and passing qualifying tests with partners from New South Wales and Queensland.

=== Teaming up with Alexandrovskaya ===
Responding to a query from the Pachins, Russia-based coach Nina Mozer suggested a tryout between Ekaterina Alexandrovskaya and Windsor in Moscow. The two began skating together in December 2015. Observing the tryout, the coaches believed that the skaters would make a good match due to similar techniques and body types.

Alexandrovskaya was released by Russia after a request from the Australian skating association, with help from Mozer.

==== 2016–2017 season ====
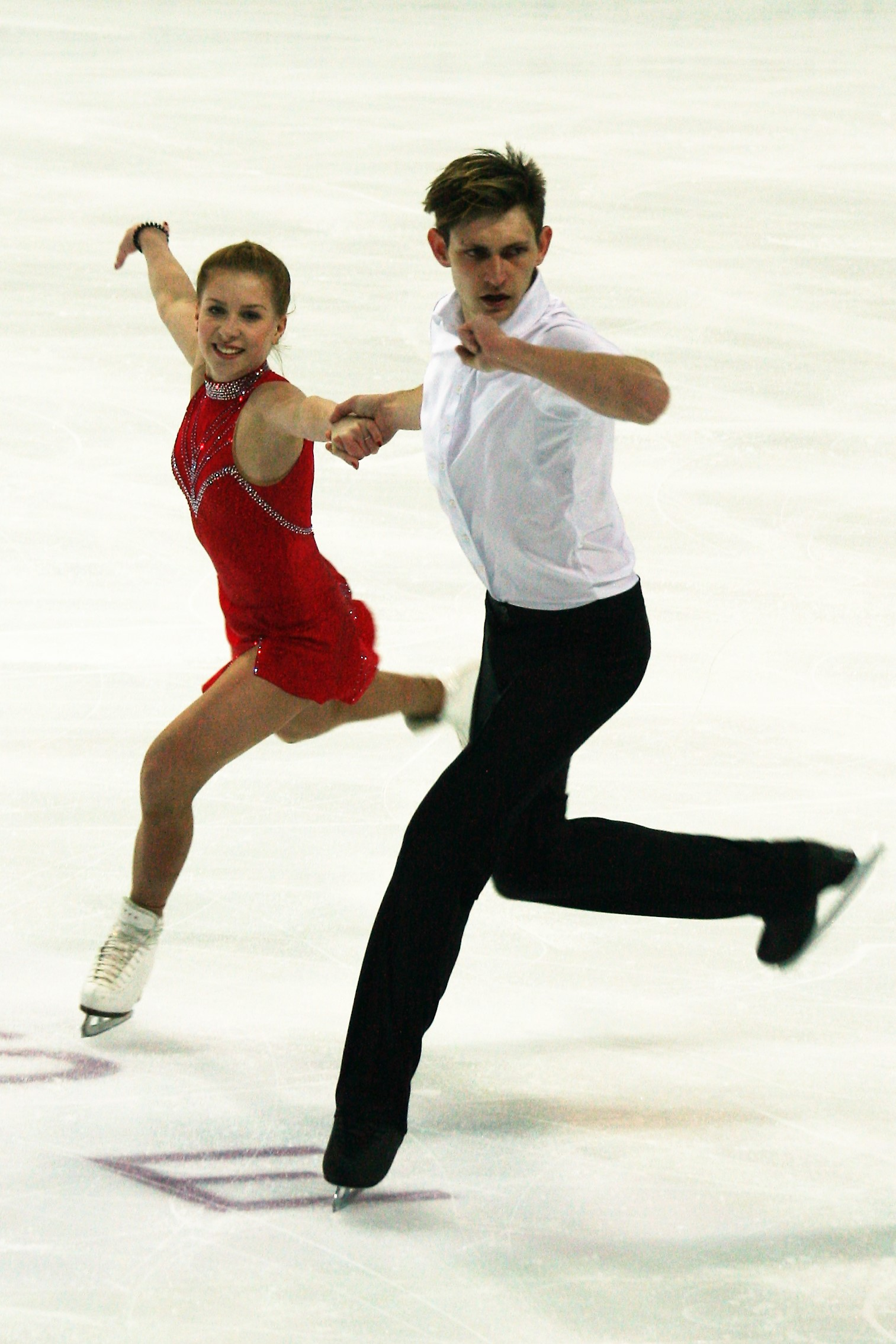
Alexandrovskaya/Windsor at the 2016–17 JGP Final

During the season, Alexandrovskaya/Windsor were coached by the Pachins in Sydney and by Andrei Hekalo and Nina Mozer in Moscow. Their international debut came in early September 2016 at the Junior Grand Prix (JGP) in Ostrava, Czech Republic. Ranked 6th in the short program and 9th in the free skate, the pair finished 8th overall. Later that month, the two competed at a JGP event in Tallinn, Estonia. They were awarded the gold medal ahead of three Russian pairs after placing third in the short and first in the free. They finished as the first substitutes for the JGP Final in Marseille, France.

Alexandrovskaya/Windsor made their senior debut in October 2016 at a Challenger Series event, the Finlandia Trophy; they placed sixth and obtained the minimum technical scores to compete at senior-level ISU Championships. In December, the pair placed 5th in France at the JGP Final, to which they were called up as replacements for Russia's Ekaterina Borisova / Dmitry Sopot. Windsor tore his patella tendon in January 2017. The following month, the pair placed 11th at the 2017 Four Continents Championships in Gangneung, South Korea.

In March, Alexandrovskaya/Windsor competed at the 2017 World Junior Championships in Taipei, Taiwan. Ranked third in the short program and second in the free skate, they finished first overall, outscoring the silver medallists, Aleksandra Boikova / Dmitrii Kozlovskii of Russia, by 2.05 points. They became the first skaters representing Australia to win gold at one of the ISU Figure Skating Championships and the first to finish on a podium at Junior Worlds since 1976, when Elizabeth Cain / Peter Cain took the pairs' bronze medal.

A couple of weeks later, the pair competed at the senior-level World Championships, which took place in Helsinki, Finland. They qualified to the free skate and went on to finish 16th.

==== 2017–2018 season ====
In early September, Alexandrovskaya/Windsor finished fourth at the 2017 JGP in Riga, Latvia. Later in the month, they competed at the 2017 CS Nebelhorn Trophy, the final qualifying opportunity for the 2018 Winter Olympics. Ranked fourth in the short program and third in the free skate, they won their first senior international medal, bronze. Their result also allowed them to become the first Australian pair skaters to compete at the Olympics since Danielle Carr / Stephen Carr's appearance at the 1998 Winter Olympics in Nagano.

In October, Alexandrovskaya/Windsor placed first in both segments at the JGP event in Gdańsk, Poland; they were awarded the gold medal and qualified to the JGP Final in Nagoya, Japan. In December, they won gold at the final, becoming the first Australian champions in the event's history.

In January, Alexandrovskaya/Windsor finished 6th overall at the 2018 Four Continents Championships in Taipei, Taiwan. They were awarded a small silver medal for their performance in the short program. In February, the two represented Australia at the 2018 Winter Olympics in Pyeongchang, South Korea. Windsor became the first Indigenous Australian to compete at the Winter Olympics. Ranked 18th in the short program, Alexandrovskaya/Windsor were not among the 16 pairs who advanced to the free skate. They were more successful at the 2018 World Championships in Milan, Italy, placing 15th in the short program and 16th overall.

At the National Dreamtime Awards 2018 Windsor was named Best New Sports Talent.

==== 2018–2019 season ====
Alexandrovskaya/Windsor moved to Montreal to train with coaches Richard Gauthier and Bruno Marcotte. Despite beginning the season with a bronze medal at the 2018 CS U.S. Classic, the move was unsuccessful, and both struggled with health and fitness concerns. They finished sixth at the 2018 CS Nebelhorn Trophy, and then made their senior Grand Prix debut, finishing seventh of eight teams at both 2018 Skate Canada International and 2018 Rostelecom Cup.

Windsor developed a chronic foot inflammation that compelled them to miss both the Four Continents and World Championships.

==== 2019–2020 season ====
After their unsuccessful season, Alexandrovskaya/Windsor moved back to Sydney and were joined there by former coach Andrei Khekalo. After months of experimentation, a solution was found for Windsor's foot inflammation that allowed them to resume training on ice. Alexandrovskaya/Windsor placed ninth at the 2019 CS Nebelhorn Trophy, and then finished seventh at the 2019 Skate America, their lone Grand Prix assignment.

On 26 February 2020, Windsor announced that he and Alexandrovskaya had dissolved their partnership due to Alexandrovskaya's ongoing health issues. Five months later, Alexandrovskaya died by suicide.

=== Partnership with Chernyshova ===
==== 2020–2021 & 2021–2022 seasons ====
Windsor did not compete during the 2020-2021 season. In August 2021, it was announced that he had paired up with Russian-born figure skater, Maria Chernyshova. Chernyshova/Windsor made their international debut for Australia at the 2021 CS Golden Spin of Zagreb in December 2021, where they finished fifteenth. The partnership ultimately dissolved following the 2021–22 figure skating season.

Following this partnership, Windsor suffered an ankle fracture after taking a hard fall on a jump attempt in practice. This injury required surgery that he had done in September 2022.

Windsor briefly went to Sochi, Russia in May 2023 to work on his pair elements with Dmitri Savin and Fedor Klimov. In July 2023, it was announced that Windsor had teamed up with Canadian-born pair skater, Cho Hye-jin, and that they would be representing South Korea together. However, the partnership would ultimately dissolve in October 2023.

=== Career break ===
As of January 2024, Windsor was taking a career break, living in Sydney with his father and brother.

== In film ==
An ABC Television feature-length documentary film, Harley & Katya, detailing Alexandrovskaya/Windsor's relationship and partnership, was released in February 2022. The film, which was directed and co-written by Selina Miles (co-written by Blayke Hoffman and Jo-anne McGowan) and produced by Aaliyah-Jade Bradbury and production company Stranger Than Fiction, was nominated for the AACTA Award for Best Feature Length Documentary at the 13th AACTA Awards in 2024. It also won an International Emmy Award for Best Sports Documentary in 2024.

== Programs ==
With Alexandrovskaya

Season	Short program	Free skating	Exhibition
2019–2020	Never Tear Us Apart performed by Joe Cocker choreo. by Julie Marcotte	Adagio of Spartacus and Phrygia (from Spartacus) by Aram Khachaturian choreo. by Julie Marcotte	
2018–2019	Never Tear Us Apart performed by Joe Cocker choreo. by Julie Marcotte	Adagio of Spartacus and Phrygia (from Spartacus) by Aram Khachaturian choreo. by Julie Marcotte; Por una cabeza by Carlos Gardel, Alfredo Le Pera choreo. by Massimo Scali	
2017–2018	Paint It Black performed by Hidden Citizen choreo. by Igor Tchiniaev	The Mask; Tango in the Park by Randy Edelman; This Business of Love by Domino; You Would Be My Baby by Vanessa Williams; Hey! Pachuco! by Straight Up choreo. by Irina Zhuk	Sign of the Times by Harry Styles
2016–2017	Skyfall by Adele	W.E. by Abel Korzeniowski	I Still Call Australia Home by Peter Allen

== Competitive highlights ==
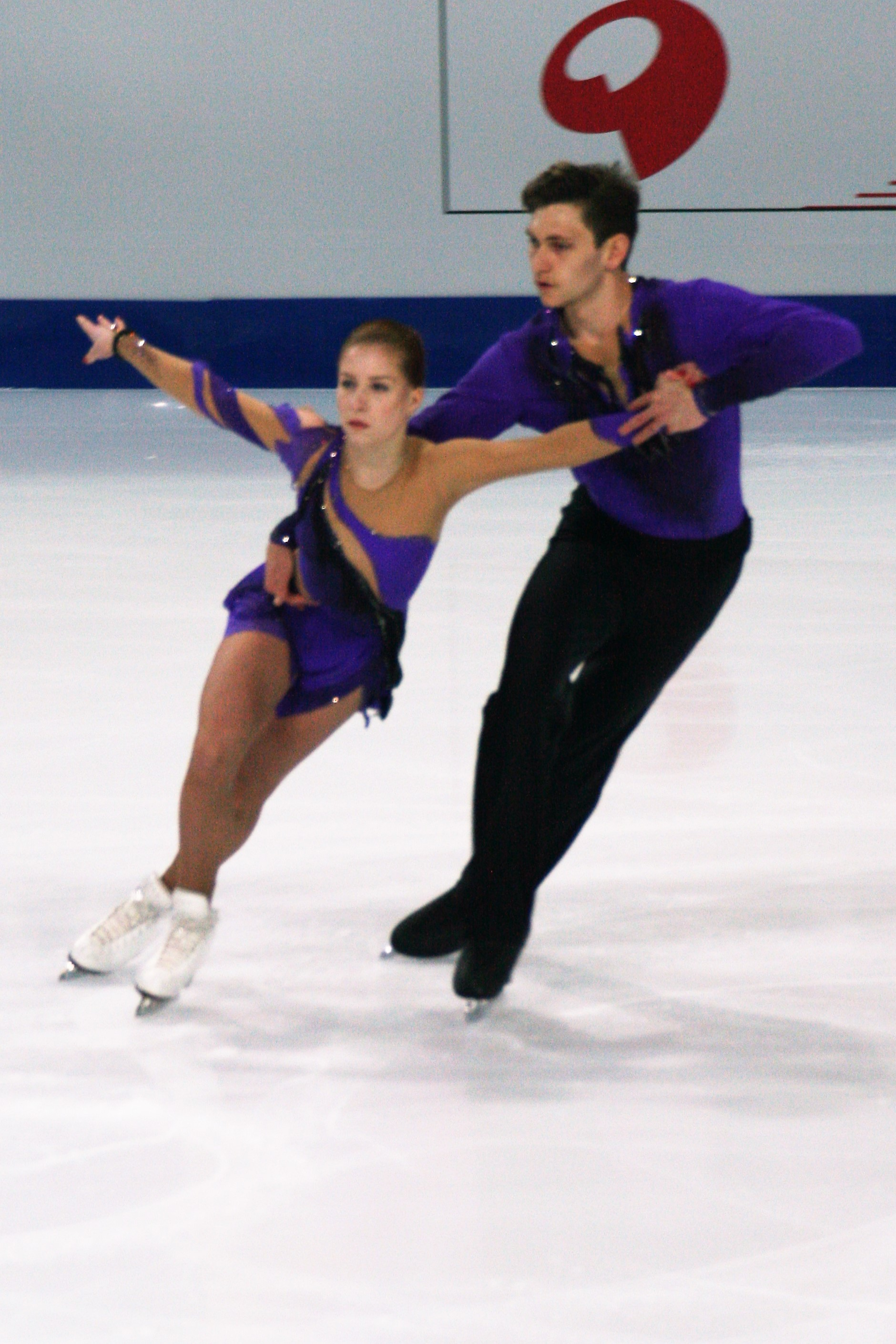
Alexandrovskaya/Windsor at the 2016–17 Junior Grand Prix Final

CS: Challenger Series; JGP: Junior Grand Prix

=== Pairs with Chernyshova ===
International
Event	21–22	22–23
GP NHK Trophy		WD
CS Golden Spin	15th	

=== Pairs with Alexandrovskaya ===
International
Event	16–17	17–18	18–19	19–20
Olympics		18th		
Worlds	16th	16th		
Four Continents	11th	6th	WD	WD
GP Rostelecom Cup			7th	
GP Skate America				7th
GP Skate Canada			7th	
CS Finlandia	6th		6th	
CS Nebelhorn		3rd		9th
CS Tallinn Trophy		1st		
CS U.S. Classic			3rd	
CS Warsaw Cup	WD			WD
International: Junior
Junior Worlds	1st			
JGP Final	5th	1st		
JGP Czech Republic	8th			
JGP Estonia	1st			
JGP Latvia		4th		
JGP Poland		1st		
National
Australian Champ.	1st		1st	
WD = Withdrew

=== Men's singles ===
National
Event	10–11	11–12	12–13	13–14	14–15
Australian Champ.	4th J	3rd J		WD	5th J
J = Junior level; WD = Withdrew
