= Andrei Bagin =

Russian ice dancer

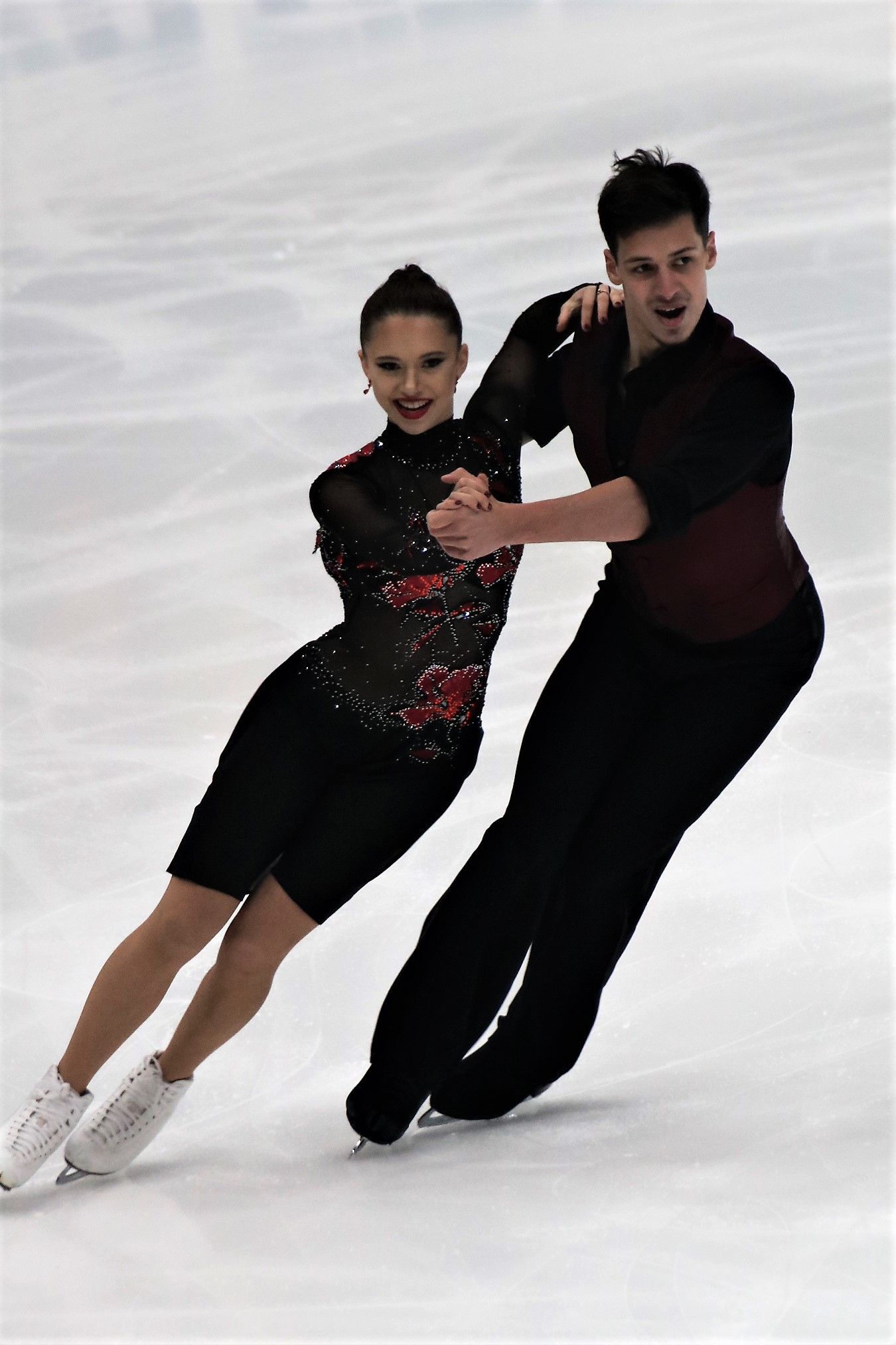
- Bagin with Morozov at the 2018 Rostelecom Cup

Personal information
- Native name: Андрей Владиславович Багин
- Full name: Andrei Vladislavovich Bagin
- Born: April 18, 1996 (age 30) Moscow, Russia
- Home town: Moscow
- Height: 1.85 m (6 ft 1 in)

Figure skating career
- Country: Russia
- Partner: Sofya Tyutyunina
- Coach: Alexander Zhulin
- Skating club: Sambo 70

Andrei Vladislavovich Bagin (Russian: Андрей Владиславович Багин, born 18 April 1996) is a Russian ice dancer. With his former partner, Annabelle Morozov, he is the 2019 CS Golden Spin of Zagreb silver medalist.

== Personal life ==
Bagin was born on 18 April 1996 in Moscow, Russia. His grandfather, Leonid Khachaturov, is the Chairman of the Coaching Council of the Figure Skating Federation of Russia (FFKKR).

== Career ==
=== Early years ===
Bagin started learning to skate in 2006. He began training in ice dancing in 2008, at the age of 12, and competed with his first partner, Kristina Baklanova, for six seasons. Based in Moscow, the two were coached by Larisa Filina before switching to Alexander Zhulin and Oleg Volkov. They debuted on the ISU Junior Grand Prix series in September 2012, finishing 8th in Istanbul, Turkey. A year later, they placed fourth at a JGP event in Košice, Slovakia. It was their final international event together.

Bagin teamed up with his second partner, Eva Khachaturian, in 2014. They trained together for two seasons under Zhulin and Volkov in Moscow and finished fourth at two JGP events.

In 2016, Bagin moved up to the senior ranks, partnered with Maria Stavitskaia. They placed 8th at the 2017 Russian Championships and 12th at the 2017 Winter Universiade before parting ways. Later that year, Bagin teamed up with Annabelle Morozov. The two decided to train under her father, Nikolai Morozov, in Moscow.

=== 2017–2018 season ===
Morozov/Bagin only competed domestically during the 2017–18 season and placed eighth at the 2018 Russian Figure Skating Championships.

=== 2018–2019 season ===
Morozov/Bagin made their international and Grand Prix debut during the 2018–19 season by receiving the Russian host pick slot at the 2018 Rostelecom Cup. The couple placed ninth at the event. Later in the season, Morozov/Bagin went on to compete at the 2018 CS Tallinn Trophy and the 2018 CS Golden Spin of Zagreb, where they placed seventh and eighth, respectively. The team completed their season at home at the 2019 Russian Figure Skating Championships, where they again finished eighth.

=== 2019–2020 season ===
Morozov/Bagin began their season at the 2019 CS Ice Star, where they placed third in the rhythm dance but later fell to fourth in the free dance and fourth overall. Nevertheless, the team set new personal bests in all three segments at this event. At their next competition, the 2019 CS Golden Spin of Zagreb, Morozov/Bagin made their first international podium, placing second in both the rhythm dance and the free dance to win the silver medal overall. The team again set new personal bests in all three segments and surpassed their previous best total score by over 13 points.

In December 2019, Morozov/Bagin earned their highest placement to date at the 2020 Russian Figure Skating Championships, finishing just off the podium in fourth behind bronze medalists Zahorski/Guerreiro.

=== 2020–2021 season ===
Morozov/Bagin started the season at the senior Russian test skates. Competing on the domestic Cup of Russia series, they won silver in the first stage in Syzran and gold in the second stage in Moscow. They competed on the Grand Prix at the 2020 Rostelecom Cup, where they placed fourth in the rhythm dance. They dropped to fifth place after the free dance.

With defending national champions Sinitsina/Katsalapov sitting out the 2021 Russian Championships due to COVID-19 infection, the bronze medal position on the podium was widely perceived as a close contest among several teams, Morozov/Bagin among them. However, they performed poorly in the rhythm dance, with Bagin first stumbling in the Finnstep pattern dance segment, and then both falling in the step sequence. As a result, they placed seventh in the rhythm dance, 15.66 points behind fifth-place Shevchenko/Eremenko and 18.02 points behind Skoptcova/Aleshin in third. They placed third in the free dance, partly due to errors from teams ahead, but due to the wide deficit from the rhythm dance, they rose only to sixth place overall. Morozov said afterward that while it had been difficult to perform after such a difficult first day, "I just tried to forget about yesterday, and we are very pleased with how we performed today."

Following the national championships, Morozov/Bagin participated in the 2021 Channel One Trophy, a televised team competition held in lieu of the cancelled European Championships. They were selected for the Red Machine team captained by Alina Zagitova. They placed fourth in both their segments of the competition, while their team finished first overall.

=== 2021–2022 season ===
Morozov and Bagin had previously been contemplating a free dance based on Nikolai Rimsky-Korsakov's Scheherazade, but had put away the idea after the onset of the pandemic. They revived the concept for the 2021–22 season, Morozov noting that they hoped "the way we portray the characters and even costume-wise and movements" were "a little bit different" from the famous free dance of Americans Davis/Charlie White. They made their season debut at the 2021 Skate America, where they placed fifth. They went on to finish sixth at the 2021 Internationaux de France.

At the 2022 Russian Championships, Morozov/Bagin finished fourth, 0.10 points behind bronze medalists Khudaiberdieva/Bazin.

Morozov/Bagin ended their partnership in March 2022. On 17 May 2022, it was announced that Bagin had teamed up with Sofya Tyutyunina, coached by Alexander Zhulin.

== Programs ==
=== With Tyutyunina ===
Season	Rhythm dance	Free dance
2023-2024	I Want to Break Free by Queen; Material Girl by Madonna	My Love; The Devil You Know; 50 Shades of Black by Sharon Kovacs
2022–2023	River by Ibeyi	Piano Concerto No. 2 by Sergei Rachmaninoff

=== With Morozov ===
Season	Rhythm dance	Free dance	Exhibition
2021–2022	Blues: My Body is a Cage by Peter Gabriel; Hip Hop: Boom Boom Pow by Black Eyed Peas choreo. by Nikolai Morozov	Scheherazade by Nikolai Rimsky-Korsakov choreo. by Nikolai Morozov	
2020–2021	Foxtrot: Hot Honey Rag; Foxtrot: Funny Honey (from Chicago) performed by Renée Zellweger; Quickstep Sing, Sing, Sing (from Swing!) choreo. by Nikolai Morozov; Too Darn Hot (from Kiss Me, Kate) performed by James T. Lane, Corbin Bleu choreo. by Nikolai Morozov	Terra Rossa by Balázs Havasi choreo. by Nikolai Morozov	
2019–2020	Too Darn Hot (from Kiss Me, Kate) performed by James T. Lane, Corbin Bleu choreo. by Nikolai Morozov	Terra Rossa by Balázs Havasi choreo. by Nikolai Morozov	Romans (Ja Tebya Nikogda Ne Zabudu) by Ariana ft. Aleksandr Marshal
2018–2019	Tango: Volver by Maxime Rodriguez; Tango: Dos Tangos choreo. by Nikolai Morozov	Tosca: E lucevan le stelle performed by Michael Bolton; E lucevan le stelle - Execution and Finale performed by Neville Marriner choreo. by Nikolai Morozov	

=== With Baklanova ===
Season	Short dance	Free dance
2013–2014	Quickstep: Puttin' On the Ritz by Irving Berlin; Foxtrot: Strangers in the Night performed by Frank Sinatra; Quickstep: Sing, Sing, Sing by Louis Prima	And the Waltz Goes On by Anthony Hopkins
2012–2013	Blues; Swing: Swing Baby	Fragile by Sting
2011–2012	Chilly Cha Cha	
2010–2011		The Umbrellas of Cherbourg by Michel Legrand

== Competitive highlights ==
GP: Grand Prix; CS: Challenger Series; JGP: Junior Grand Prix

=== With Tyutyunina ===
National
Event	2022–23
Russian Champ.	4th
Russian Cup Final (Note: The 2023 Russian Cup Final was renamed as the 2023 Russian Grand Prix Final.)	3rd
GPR Moscow Stars	2nd
GPR Perm Territory	1st

=== With Morozov ===
International
Event	17–18	18–19	19–20	20–21	21–22
GP France					6th
GP Rostelecom		9th		5th	
GP Skate America					5th
CS Golden Spin		8th	2nd		WD
CS Ice Star			4th		
CS Tallinn Trophy		7th			
National
Russian Champ.	8th	8th	4th	6th	4th
Russian Cup Final	1st	3rd		2nd	
TBD = Assigned; WD = Withdrew

=== With Stavitskaia ===
International
Event	2016–17
Winter Universiade	12th
National
Russian Championships	8th

=== With Khachaturian ===
International: Junior
Event	2014–15	2015–16
JGP Japan	4th	
JGP Slovenia	4th	
Ice Star	1st	
Leo Scheu Memorial	3rd	
NRW Trophy		2nd
Toruń Cup	3rd	
National
Russian Junior Champ.	6th	

=== With Baklanova ===
International: Junior
Event	2010–11	2011–12	2012–13	2013–14
JGP Slovakia				4th
JGP Turkey			8th	
NRW Trophy			9th	
Santa Claus Cup			3rd	
National
Russian Junior Champ.	13th	10th	6th	
Russian Cup Final		2nd J	2nd J	
J = Junior level

== Detailed results ==
Small medals for short and free programs awarded only at ISU Championships. At team events, medals awarded for team results only. ISU personal bests highlighted in bold.

=== With Morozov ===
**2021–22 season**
Date	Event	RD	FD	Total
December 21–26, 2021	2022 Russian Championships	5; 78.02	4; 117.63	4; 195.65
November 19–21, 2021	2021 Internationaux de France	6; 68.45	8; 103.87	6; 172.32
October 22–24, 2021	2021 Skate America	5; 68.79	5; 106.53	5; 175.32
**2020–21 season**
Date	Event	RD	FD	Total
Feb. 26– Mar. 2, 2021	2021 Russian Cup Final domestic competition	2; 76.43	2; 125.86	2; 202.29
February 5–7, 2021	2021 Channel One Trophy	4; 80.54	4; 123.27	1T/4P; 203.81
December 23–27, 2020	2021 Russian Championships	7; 62.17	3; 120.69	6; 182.86
November 20–22, 2020	2020 Rostelecom Cup	4; 76.21	5; 114.79	5; 191.00
October 10–13, 2020	2020 Cup of Russia Series, 2nd Stage, Moscow domestic competition	2; 77.03	1; 120.97	1; 198.00
September 18–22, 2020	2020 Cup of Russia Series, 1st Stage, Syzran domestic competition	2; 76.60	1; 118.15	2; 194.75
2019–20 season
Date	Event	RD	FD	Total
December 24–29, 2019	2020 Russian Championships	5; 73.67	4; 115.43	4; 189.10
December 4–7, 2019	2019 CS Golden Spin of Zagreb	2; **78.75**	2; **112.96**	2; **191.71**
October 18–20, 2019	2019 CS Ice Star	3; 75.25	4; 102.77	4; 178.02
2018–19 season
December 21–24, 2018	2019 Russian Championships	8; 65.95	8; 97.21	8; 163.16
December 5–8, 2018	2018 CS Golden Spin of Zagreb	10; 54.51	7; 97.04	8; 151.55
November 26–29, 2018	2018 CS Tallinn Trophy	7; 56.47	7; 91.53	7; 148.00
November 16–18, 2018	2018 Rostelecom Cup	9; 51.69	9; 81.89	9; 133.58
2017–18 season
December 19–24, 2017	2018 Russian Championships	9; 52.32	7; 85.54	8; 137.86
