= Ekaterina Alexandrovskaya =

Russian-Australian pair skater (2000–2020)

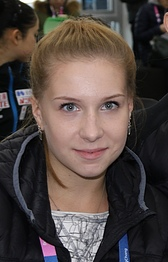
- Alexandrovskaya in 2017

Personal information
- Native name: Екатери́на Дми́триевна Алекса́ндровская
- Full name: Ekaterina Dmitriyevna Alexandrovskaya
- Other names: Katya Aleksandrovskaya
- Born: 1 January 2000 Moscow, Russia
- Died: 18 July 2020 (aged 20) Moscow, Russia
- Height: 1.54 m (5 ft 1 in)

Figure skating career
- Country: Australia
- Coach: Andrei Khekalo
- Skating club: Sydney FSC Moscow, Russia
- Began skating: 2004
- Retired: 2020
Medal record
Representing Australia
Figure skating: Pairs
World Junior Championships
Gold medal – first place	2017 Taipei	Pairs
Junior Grand Prix Final
Gold medal – first place	2017–18 Nagoya	Pairs

Ekaterina Dmitriyevna Alexandrovskaya (Russian: Екатери́на Дми́триевна Алекса́ндровская; 1 January 2000 – 18 July 2020) was a Russian-Australian pair skater. With her skating partner, Harley Windsor, she was the 2017 CS Tallinn Trophy champion, the 2017 CS Nebelhorn Trophy bronze medallist, the 2018 CS U.S. Classic bronze medallist, and a two-time Australian national champion (2017, 2019).

At the junior level, she was the 2017 World Junior champion, the 2017 Junior Grand Prix Final champion, the 2016 JGP Estonia champion, and the 2017 JGP Poland champion.

The 2022 documentary Harley & Katya portrays her partnership with Windsor.

== Early life ==
Alexandrovskaya was born on January 1, 2000 in Moscow. Her father died in 2015. She became an Australian citizen in October 2017. Aleksandrovskaya struggled with depression and began treatment for epilepsy in January 2020.

== Career ==
=== Early career ===
Alexandrovskaya started learning to skate in 2004 when she was four. After competing as a single skater through 2011–2012, she began appearing in pairs with Vladislav Lysoy during the 2012–2013 season. She skated with Aleksandr Epifanov in 2014–2015 and 2015–2016.

=== Teaming with Windsor ===
Responding to a query from Australian-based coaches Andrei and Galina Pachin, her coach Nina Mozer suggested a tryout between Alexandrovskaya and Harley Windsor in Moscow. The two began skating together in December 2015. Observing the tryout, the coaches believed that the skaters would make a good match due to similar technique and body types.

Alexandrovskaya was released by Russia after a request from the Australian skating association, with help from Mozer.

=== 2016–2017 season ===
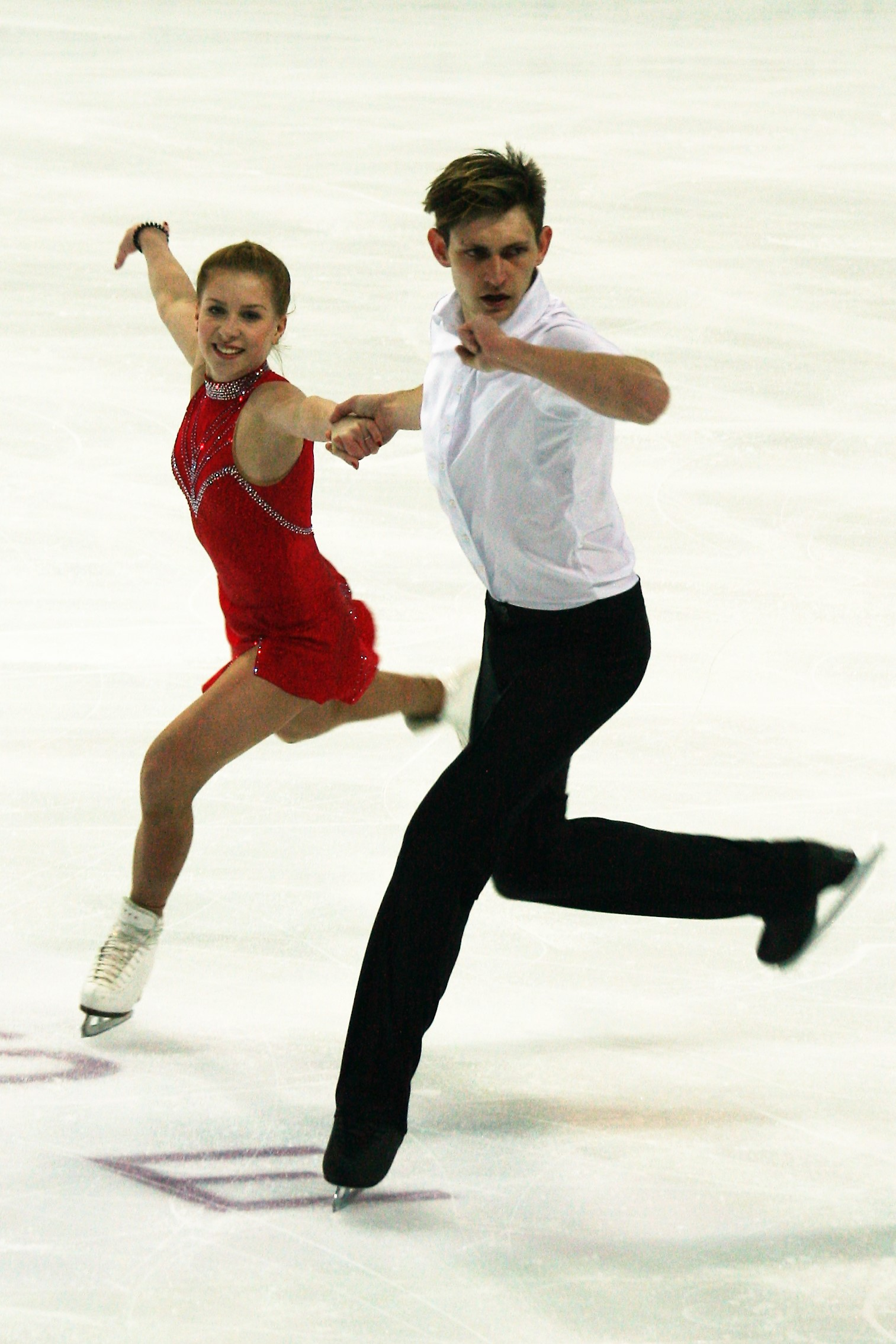
Alexandrovskaya/Windsor at the 2016–17 JGP Final

During the season, Alexandrovskaya/Windsor were coached by the Pachins in Sydney and by Andrei Hekalo and Nina Mozer in Moscow. Their international debut came in early September 2016 at the Junior Grand Prix (JGP) in Ostrava, Czech Republic. Ranked 6th in the short program and 9th in the free skate, the pair finished 8th overall. Later that month, the two competed at a JGP event in Tallinn, Estonia. They were awarded the gold medal ahead of three Russian pairs after placing third in the short and first in the free. They finished as the first substitutes for the JGP Final in Marseille, France.

Alexandrovskaya/Windsor made their senior debut in October 2016 at a Challenger Series event, the Finlandia Trophy; they placed sixth and obtained the minimum technical scores to compete at senior-level ISU Championships. In December, the pair placed 5th in France at the JGP Final, to which they were called up as replacements for Russia's Ekaterina Borisova / Dmitry Sopot. Windsor tore his patella tendon in January 2017. The following month, the pair placed 11th at the 2017 Four Continents Championships in Gangneung, South Korea.

In March the same year, Alexandrovskaya/Windsor competed at the 2017 World Junior Championships in Taipei, Taiwan. Ranked third in the short program and second in the free skate, they finished first overall, outscoring the silver medallists, Aleksandra Boikova / Dmitrii Kozlovskii of Russia, by 2.05 points. They became the first skaters representing Australia to win gold at one of the ISU Figure Skating Championships and the first to finish on a podium at Junior Worlds since 1976, when Elizabeth Cain / Peter Cain took the pairs' bronze medal. A couple of weeks later, the pair competed at the senior-level World Championships, which took place in Helsinki, Finland. They qualified to the free skate and went on to finish 16th.

=== 2017–2018 season ===
In early September, Alexandrovskaya/Windsor finished fourth at the 2017 JGP in Riga, Latvia. Later in the month, they competed at the 2017 CS Nebelhorn Trophy, the final qualifying opportunity for the 2018 Winter Olympics. Ranked fourth in the short program and third in the free skate, they won their first senior international medal, bronze. Their result also allowed them to become the first Australian pair skaters to compete at the Olympics since Danielle Carr / Stephen Carr's appearance at the 1998 Winter Olympics.

In October, Alexandrovskaya/Windsor placed first in both segments at the JGP event in Gdańsk, Poland; they were awarded the gold medal and qualified for the JGP Final in Nagoya, Japan. In December, they won gold at the final, becoming the first Australian champions in the event's history.

In January, Alexandrovskaya/Windsor finished 6th overall at the 2018 Four Continents Championships in Taipei, Taiwan. They were awarded a small silver medal for their performance in the short program. In February, the two represented Australia at the 2018 Winter Olympics in Pyeongchang, South Korea. Ranked 18th in the short program, they were not among the 16 pairs who advanced to the free skate. They were more successful at the 2018 World Championships in Milan, Italy, placing 15th in the short program and 16th overall.

=== 2018–2019 season ===
Alexandrovskaya/Windsor moved to Montreal to train with coaches Richard Gauthier and Bruno Marcotte. Despite beginning the season with a bronze medal at the 2018 CS U.S. Classic, the move was overall not a success, and both struggled with health and fitness concerns. They finished sixth at the 2018 CS Nebelhorn Trophy, and then made their senior Grand Prix debut, finishing seventh of eight teams at both 2018 Skate Canada International and 2018 Rostelecom Cup.

Windsor developed a chronic foot inflammation that caused them to miss both the Four Continents and World Championships.

=== 2019–2020 season ===
After their unsuccessful season, Alexandrovskaya/Windsor moved back to Sydney, and were joined there by former coach Andrei Khekalo. After months of experimentation, a solution was found for Windsor's foot inflammation that allowed them to resume training on ice. Alexandrovskaya/Windsor placed ninth at the 2019 CS Nebelhorn Trophy, and then finished seventh at the 2019 Skate America, their lone Grand Prix assignment.

They withdrew from the 2019 CS Warsaw Cup, and did not compete at 2019 Australian Figure Skating Championships, though they were still named to the 2020 Four Continents Figure Skating Championships team. They withdrew from that competition also, and Windsor announced that they had split due to Alexandrovskaya retiring because of health issues. It was subsequently reported by coach Khekalo that Alexandrovskaya had an epileptic seizure in early January that prompted her retirement.

== Death ==
On July 18, 2020, Alexandrovskaya died after jumping out of the 6th floor window of her Moscow home, in a suspected suicide, leaving behind a note that said "Lyublyu" (Russian: Люблю, lit. 'I love'). She was 20 years old.

== In film ==
An ABC Television feature-length documentary film, Harley & Katya, detailing Alexandrovskaya/Windsor's relationship and partnership, was released in February 2022. The film, which was directed and co-written by Selina Miles (co-written by Blayke Hoffman) and produced by Aaliyah-Jade Bradbury, and production company Stranger Than Fiction, was nominated for the AACTA Award for Best Feature Length Documentary at the 13th AACTA Awards in 2024. It also won an International Emmy Award for Best Sports Documentary in 2024.

== Programs ==
=== With Windsor ===
Season	Short program	Free skating	Exhibition
2019–2020	Never Tear Us Apart performed by Joe Cocker choreo. by Julie Marcotte	Adagio of Spartacus and Phrygia (from Spartacus) by Aram Khachaturian choreo. by Julie Marcotte	
2018–2019	Never Tear Us Apart performed by Joe Cocker choreo. by Julie Marcotte	Adagio of Spartacus and Phrygia (from Spartacus) by Aram Khachaturian choreo. by Julie Marcotte; Por una cabeza by Carlos Gardel, Alfredo Le Pera choreo. by Massimo Scali	
2017–2018	Paint It Black performed by Hidden Citizen choreo. by Igor Tchiniaev	The Mask; Tango in the Park by Randy Edelman; This Business of Love by Domino; You Would Be My Baby by Vanessa Williams; Hey! Pachuco! by Straight Up choreo. by Irina Zhuk	Sign of the Times by Harry Styles
2016–2017	Skyfall by Adele	W.E. by Abel Korzeniowski	I Still Call Australia Home by Peter Allen

== Competitive highlights with Windsor ==
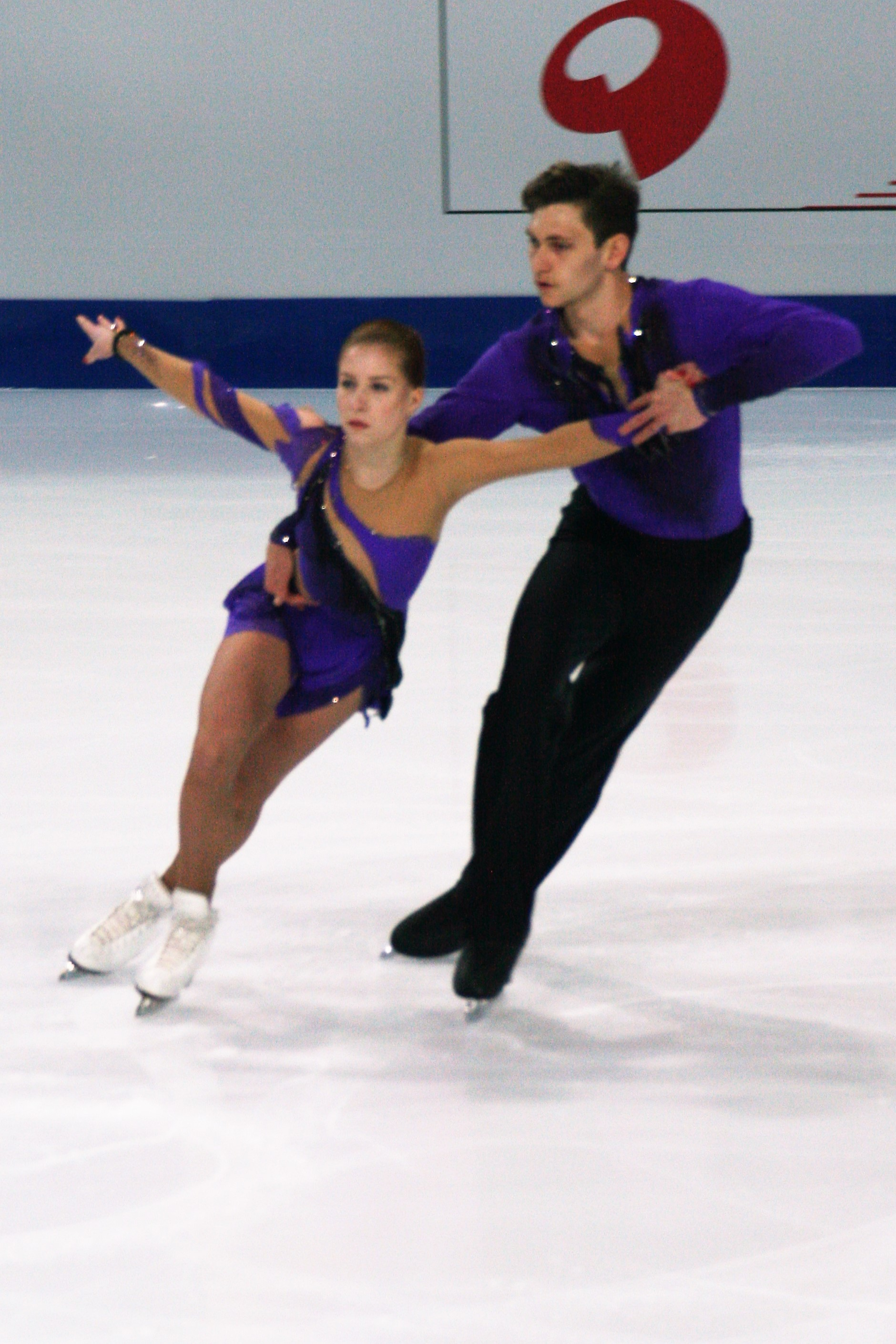
Alexandrovskaya/Windsor at the 2016–17 Junior Grand Prix Final

GP: Grand Prix; CS: Challenger Series; JGP: Junior Grand Prix

International
Event	16–17	17–18	18–19	19–20
Olympics		18th		
Worlds	16th	16th		
Four Continents	11th	6th	WD	WD
GP Rostelecom Cup			7th	
GP Skate America				7th
GP Skate Canada			7th	
CS Finlandia	6th		6th	
CS Nebelhorn		3rd		9th
CS Tallinn Trophy		1st		
CS U.S. Classic			3rd	
CS Warsaw Cup	WD			WD
International: Junior
Junior Worlds	1st			
JGP Final	5th	1st		
JGP Czech Republic	8th			
JGP Estonia	1st			
JGP Latvia		4th		
JGP Poland		1st		
National
Australian Champ.	1st		1st	
WD = Withdrew
