= Egor Bazin =

Russian ice dancer (born 1995)

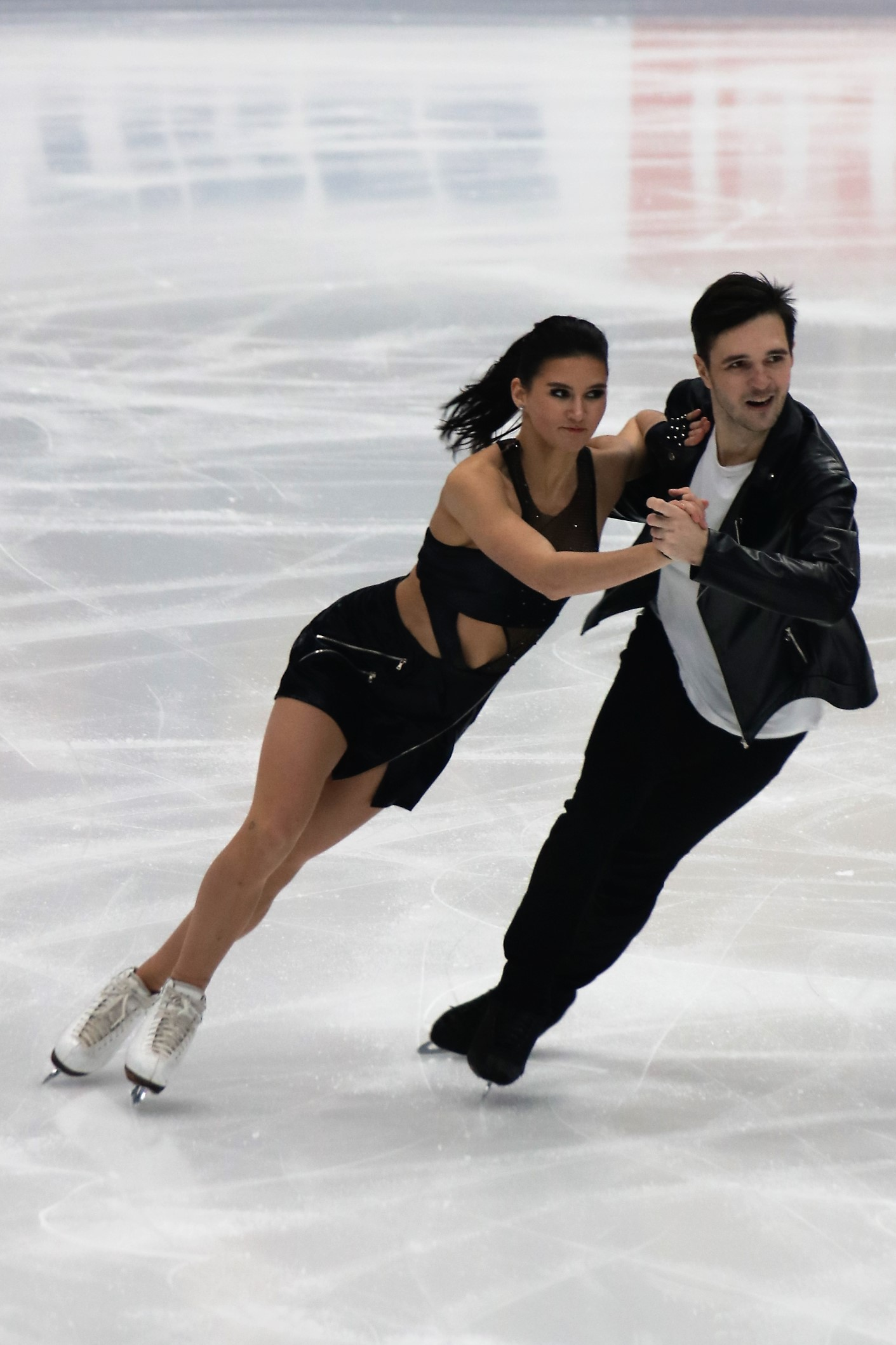
- Bazin with Evdokimova at the 2018 Rostelecom Cup

Personal information
- Native name: Егор Юрьевич Базин
- Full name: Egor Yuryevich Bazin
- Born: 13 September 1995 (age 31) Tolyatti, Samara Oblast, Russia
- Home town: Tolyatti, Russia
- Height: 1.84 m (6 ft 1/2 in)

Figure skating career
- Country: Russia
- Partner: Elizaveta Khudaiberdieva
- Coach: Alexander Zhulin
- Skating club: SHVSM No. 4 Tolyatti
- Began skating: 2001
- Retired: April 21, 2025
Medal record
Representing Russia
Figure skating: Ice dancing
Winter Universiade
Silver medal – second place	2017 Almaty	Ice dancing
Silver medal – second place	2019 Krasnoyarsk	Ice dancing

Egor Yuryevich Bazin (Russian: Егор Юрьевич Базин, born 13 September 1995) is a retired Russian ice dancer. With his skating partner, Elizaveta Khudaiberdieva, he is the 2023 Russian champion, 2022 Russian national bronze medalist.

With his former partner, Sofia Evdokimova, he is the 2017 Winter Universiade silver medalist, the 2018 Ice Star champion, and the 2019 Russian national bronze medalist.

== Career ==
=== Early career ===
Bazin teamed up with Sofia Evdokimova in 2007. The duo debuted on the ISU Junior Grand Prix (JGP) series in the 2011–12 season, finishing seventh in Austria. In the 2013–14 season, they won their first JGP medal – bronze in Mexico.

=== 2014–2015 season ===
Evdokimova/Bazin started their season by competing in the 2014 JGP series. They placed fourth in both events, first at the JGP Czech Republic and then at the JGP Germany.

In 2014–15 season, Evdokimova/Bazin stepped onto the national podium for the first time, beating Loboda/Drozd by 0.19 points for the bronze medal at the Russian Junior Championships. Based on this result, they were chosen to compete as Russia's third ice dancing team at the 2015 World Junior Championships in Tallinn, Estonia. Finishing tenth, Evdokimova/Bazin were the second best Russian duet after Yanovskaya/Mozgov (gold), with Popova/Vlasenko placing eleventh.

=== 2015–2016 season ===
In the 2015–16 season, Evdokimova/Bazin won their second JGP medal – bronze in Latvia. Two weeks later, they placed fifth in JGP Austria. In October 2015, they won their first international gold medal at the 2015 Ice Star. In January 2016 they finished fourth at the 2016 Russian Junior Championships.

=== 2016–2017 season: First Winter Universiade silver medal ===
In November 2016, Evdokimova/Bazin made their Grand Prix debut at the 2016 Rostelecom Cup, where they placed ninth. A month later, they skated their first Challenger event at the 2016 CS Golden Spin of Zagreb, where they also placed ninth. In December, they placed sixth at the 2017 Russian Championships. In February 2017, they competed at the 2017 Winter Universiade, where they won the silver medal behind Nazorova/Nikitin.

=== 2017–2018 season ===
In November 2017, Evdokimova/Bazin skated at the 2017 CS Tallinn Trophy, where they placed fourth. In Tallinn, they were close to claiming their first Challenger series medal because they were less than 0.5 points behind the bronze medalists, Pogrebinsky/Benoit. A month later, Evdokimova/Bazin placed fifth at the 2018 Russian Championships.

=== 2018–2019 season ===
Evdokimova/Bazin started their season at the 2018 CS Finlandia Trophy, where they finished seventh with a personal best score of 159.67 points. They won their first international senior gold medal two weeks later at the 2018 Ice Star. In mid-November, they competed at the 2018 Rostelecom Cup, where they finished fourth after placing sixth in the rhythm dance and fourth in the free dance. At this competition, they also scored their personal best score 164.66 points. In late November, they placed fourth at the 2018 CS Tallinn Trophy with a personal best score of 168.31 points.

At the 2019 Russian Championships, Evdokimova/Bazin placed fourth in the rhythm dance, around 3 points behind the third-place finishers Zahorski/Guerreiro and only half a point ahead of Shpilevaya/Smirnov in fifth. In the free dance, a disastrous skate by Zahorski/Guerreiro allowed them to take the bronze medal. Bazin said this had been their goal from the beginning of the season. They competed at their first European Championships, placing ninth.

=== 2019–2020 season: End of partnership with Evdokimova ===
Evodkimova/Bazin placed seventh at the 2019 CS Ondrej Nepela Memorial to begin the season. Competing on the Grand Prix, they were ninth at the 2019 Skate Canada International and then sixth at the 2019 Cup of China. At the 2020 Russian Championships, they placed seventh.

In March, it was announced that the two had split.

In May, Bazin was named to the Russian senior national team for the 2020–21 season with new partner and 2019 Junior Worlds silver medalist, Elizaveta Khudaiberdieva.

=== 2020–2021 season: Debut of Khudaiberdieva/Bazin ===
Khudaiberdieva/Bazin made their debut at the senior Russian test skates, where Bazin fell on a twizzle in the free dance. They made their competitive debut at the first stage of the domestic Russian Cup series, the qualifying competition series to the 2021 Russian Figure Skating Championships, in Syzran in September. They placed first in the rhythm dance and second in the free dance to narrowly win the gold medal ahead of Morozov/Bagin. At their next event, the third stage held in Sochi, the team placed second in both the rhythm dance and the free dance to take second overall behind reigning national bronze medalists Zahorski/Guerreiro.

In November, Khudaiberdieva/Bazin made their international debut at the 2020 Rostelecom Cup, where they placed fifth in the rhythm dance, just narrowly behind Morozov/Bagin. In the free dance, Khudaiberdieva/Bazin managed to overtake Morozov/Bagin by a little less than three points to place fourth in the free dance and fourth overall.

Competing at their first senior Russian Championships together (and Khudaiberdieva's first), they placed fourth in the rhythm dance despite a twizzle wobble from Bazin that earned him only a level 2 on that element. In the free dance, Khudaiberdieva stumbled on her twizzle sequence, placing them sixth in that segment and fifth overall.

Following the national championships, Khudaiberdieva/Bazin participated in the 2021 Channel One Trophy, a televised team competition held in lieu of the cancelled European Championships. They were selected for the Red Machine team captained by Alina Zagitova. They placed fifth in both their segments of the competition, while their team finished in first overall.

=== 2021–2022 season ===
Khudaiberdieva/Bazin began the season at the 2021 CS Denis Ten Memorial Challenge, where they won the bronze medal and then took gold at the Volvo Open Cup. In their lone Grand Prix assignment, they were eighth at the 2021 Rostelecom Cup.

At the 2022 Russian Championships, Khudaiberdieva/Bazin placed sixth in the rhythm dance. In the free dance, following the withdrawal of top team Sinitsina/Katsalapov due to injury, Khudaiberdieva/Bazin moved up to the bronze medal with a third place in that segment. Bazin said afterward, "not only one couple tried to qualify for the Olympics, everyone tried. We want to at least have a chance to fight a little bit." This was widely interpreted as querying the validity of the scores for controversial silver medalists Davis/Smolkin.

Khudaiberdieva/Bazin announced their retirement from competitive ice dance in April 2025.

== Programs ==
=== With Khudaibedieva ===
Season	Rhythm dance	Free dance	Exhibition
2022-2023	California Dreamin' performed by José Feliciano; I Like It Like That by Tony Pabón and Manny Rodriguez; De Donde Soy by Thalía	Sweet Dreams by Eurythmics choreo. by Eva Uvarova	
2021–2022	Blues: Come Together performed by Gary Clark Jr. and Junkie XL; Disco: It's Raining Men performed by Geri Halliwell	Lose Yourself performed by David Garrett; Rain, In Your Black Eyes by Ezio Bosso	
2020–2021	Charleston: George Valentin (from The Artist); Quickstep: Sing, Sing, Sing by Benny Goodman	Experience by Ludovico Einaudi; Ni**as in Paris (Piano) by Jay-Z and Kanye West	Charlie Chaplin medley

=== With Evdokimova ===
Season	Rhythm dance	Free dance
2019–2020	Blues, Quickstep: 42nd Street (from 42nd Street) by Harry Warren & Al Dubin	Remembrances (from Schindler's List) by John Williams; La terre vue du ciel by Armand Amar
2018–2019	Tango: Come Together performed by Marea Tango; Hip Hop: Imma Be performed by Black Eyed Peas	Nocturne by Secret Garden; Sarabande Suite by Globus
	Short dance	
2017–2018	Rhumba: Historia de un Amor; Samba: Arrasando performed by Thalía	Ave Maria by Thomas Spencer-Wortley
2016–2017	Blues: Minnie the Moocher; Swing: Big and Bad performed by Big Bad Voodoo Daddy	Hip Hip Chin Chin performed by Club des Belugas; Temptation performed by Diana Krall
2015–2016	Waltz: Waltz No. 2 by Dmitri Shostakovich; March: Polish polka medley	Romeo + Juliet by Craig Armstrong, Nellee Hooper
2014–2015	Samba: Paxi Ni Ngongo by Bonga; Rhumba; Samba	The best of Goran Bregović
2013–2014	Hava Nagila; Sixteen Tons	Malagueña by Ernesto Lecuona
2012–2013	Blues; Swing	Gangs of New York by Howard Shore
2011–2012	Cha Cha: Pao Pao by Elli Kokkinou; Mambo Mambo by Lou Bega	Russian Sailors Dance (from The Red Poppy) by Reinhold Glière

== Competitive highlights ==
GP: Grand Prix; CS: Challenger Series; JGP: Junior Grand Prix

=== With Khudaiberdieva ===
International
Event	20–21	21–22	22–23	23–24	24–25
GP Rostelecom Cup	4th	8th			
CS Denis Ten Memorial		3rd			
CS Cup of Austria		WD			
Volvo Open Cup		1st			
National
Russian Championships	5th	3rd	1st	2nd	2nd
Russian Cup Final				2nd	
TBD = Assigned

=== With Evdokimova ===
International
Event	10–11	11–12	12–13	13–14	14–15	15–16	16–17	17–18	18–19	19–20
Europeans									9th	
GP Cup of China										6th
GP Rostelecom Cup							9th	WD	4th	
GP Skate Canada										9th
CS Finlandia Trophy									7th	
CS Golden Spin							9th			
CS Nepela Trophy										7th
CS Tallinn Trophy								4th	4th	
Universiade							2nd		2nd	
Bosphorus Cup									1st	3rd
Ice Mall Cup									2nd	
Ice Star							3rd		1st	
International: Junior
Junior Worlds					10th					
JGP Austria		7th				5th				
JGP Czech Rep.				4th	4th					
JGP France			5th							
JGP Germany					4th					
JGP Latvia						3rd				
JGP Mexico				3rd						
JGP Slovenia			7th							
Ice Star						1st				
National
Russia							6th	5th	3rd	7th
Russia, Junior	11th	6th	5th		3rd	4th				
TBD = Assigned; WD = Withdrew

== Detailed results ==
Small medals for short and free programs awarded only at ISU Championships.

=== With Khudaiberdieva ===
2021–2022 season
Date	Event	RD	FD	Total
21–26 December 2021	2022 Russian Championships	6; 77.91	3; 117.84	3; 195.75
November 26–28, 2021	2021 Rostelecom Cup	8; 71.05	7; 106.46	8; 177.51
November 3–7, 2021	2021 Volvo Open Cup	1; 75.48	1; 110.13	1; 185.61
October 28–31, 2021	2021 Denis Ten Memorial Challenge	2; 77.08	3; 109.72	3; 186.80
2020–2021 season
Date	Event	RD	FD	Total
February 5–7, 2021	2021 Channel One Trophy	5; 79.13	5; 123.09	1T/5P; 202.22
December 23–27, 2020	2021 Russian Championships	4; 78.01	6; 114.67	5; 192.68
November 20–22, 2020	2020 Rostelecom Cup	5; 76.10	4; 117.08	4; 193.18
October 23–27, 2020	2020 Cup of Russia Series, 3rd Stage, Sochi domestic competition	2; 79.29	2; 117.71	2; 197.00
September 18–22, 2020	2020 Cup of Russia Series, 1st Stage, Syzran domestic competition	1; 78.19	2; 117.68	1; 195.87

=== With Evdokimova ===
2019–20 season
Date	Event	RD	FD	Total
24–29 December 2019	2020 Russian Championships	6; 71.42	7; 109.26	7; 180.68
25–30 November 2019	2019 Bosphorus Cup	4; 71.61	3; 108.34	3; 179.95
8–10 November 2019	2019 Cup of China	7; 64.07	6; 105.20	6; 169.27
25–27 October 2019	2019 Skate Canada	9; 67.20	10; 100.19	9; 167.39
19–21 September 2019	2019 CS Ondrej Nepela Memorial	6; 66.31	7; 98.31	7; 164.62
2018–19 season
Date	Event	RD	FD	Total
7–9 March 2019	2019 Winter Universiade	2; 68.32	1; 113.01	2; 181.33
20–23 February 2019	2019 Open Ice Mall Cup	2; 72.95	2; 104.44	2; 177.39
21–27 January 2019	2019 European Championships	11; 66.65	8; 108.97	9; 175.62
19–23 December 2018	2019 Russian Championships	4; 69.87	3; 109.34	3; 179.21
27 November – 1 December 2018	2018 Bosphorus Cup	2; 67.82	1; 109.89	1; 177.71
26 November – 2 December 2018	2018 CS Tallinn Trophy	4; 62.28	4; 106.03	4; 168.31
16–18 November 2018	2018 Rostelecom Cup	6; 64.05	4; 100.61	4; 164.66
18–21 October 2018	2018 Ice Star	2; 61.26	1; 106.86	1; 168.12
4–7 October 2018	2018 CS Finlandia Trophy	7; 61.33	7; 98.34	7; 159.67
2017–18 season
Date	Event	SD	FD	Total
21–24 December 2017	2018 Russian Championships	7; 62.18	5; 99.28	5; 161.46
21–26 November 2017	2017 CS Tallinn Trophy	3; 59.88	4; 90.40	4; 150.28
2016–17 season
Date	Event	SD	FD	Total
1–5 February 2017	2017 Winter Universiade	2; 63.96	2; 93.00	2; 156.96
22–25 December 2016	2017 Russian Championships	6; 60.85	6; 91.30	6; 152.15
7–10 December 2016	2016 CS Golden Spin of Zagreb	8; 56.80	10; 86.16	9; 142.96
18–20 November 2016	2016 Ice Star	3; 60.42	5; 90.34	3; 150.76
4–6 November 2016	2016 Rostelecom Cup	9; 55.83	9; 77.54	9; 133.37

2015–16 season
Date	Event	Level	SD	FD	Total
21–23 January 2016	2016 Russian Junior Championships	Junior	5; 60.15	5; 84.60	4; 144.75
9–11 October 2015	2015 Ice Star	Junior	1; 64.52	1; 91.73	1; 156.25
9–13 September 2015	2015 JGP Austria	Junior	5; 56.55	5; 81.05	5; 137.60
26–30 August 2015	2015 JGP Latvia	Junior	4; 54.29	4; 78.28	3; 132.57
2014–15 season
Date	Event	Level	SD	FD	Total
2–8 March 2015	2015 World Junior Championships	Junior	11; 50.44	10; 76.50	10; 126.94
4–7 February 2015	2015 Russian Junior Championships	Junior	5; 54.53	3; 86.03	3; 140.56
1–5 October 2014	2014 JGP Germany	Junior	5; 48.69	4; 77.85	4; 126.54
3–7 September 2014	2014 JGP Czech Republic	Junior	5; 47.51	3; 81.23	4; 128.74
