= James T. Lane =

American actor and dancer (born 1977)

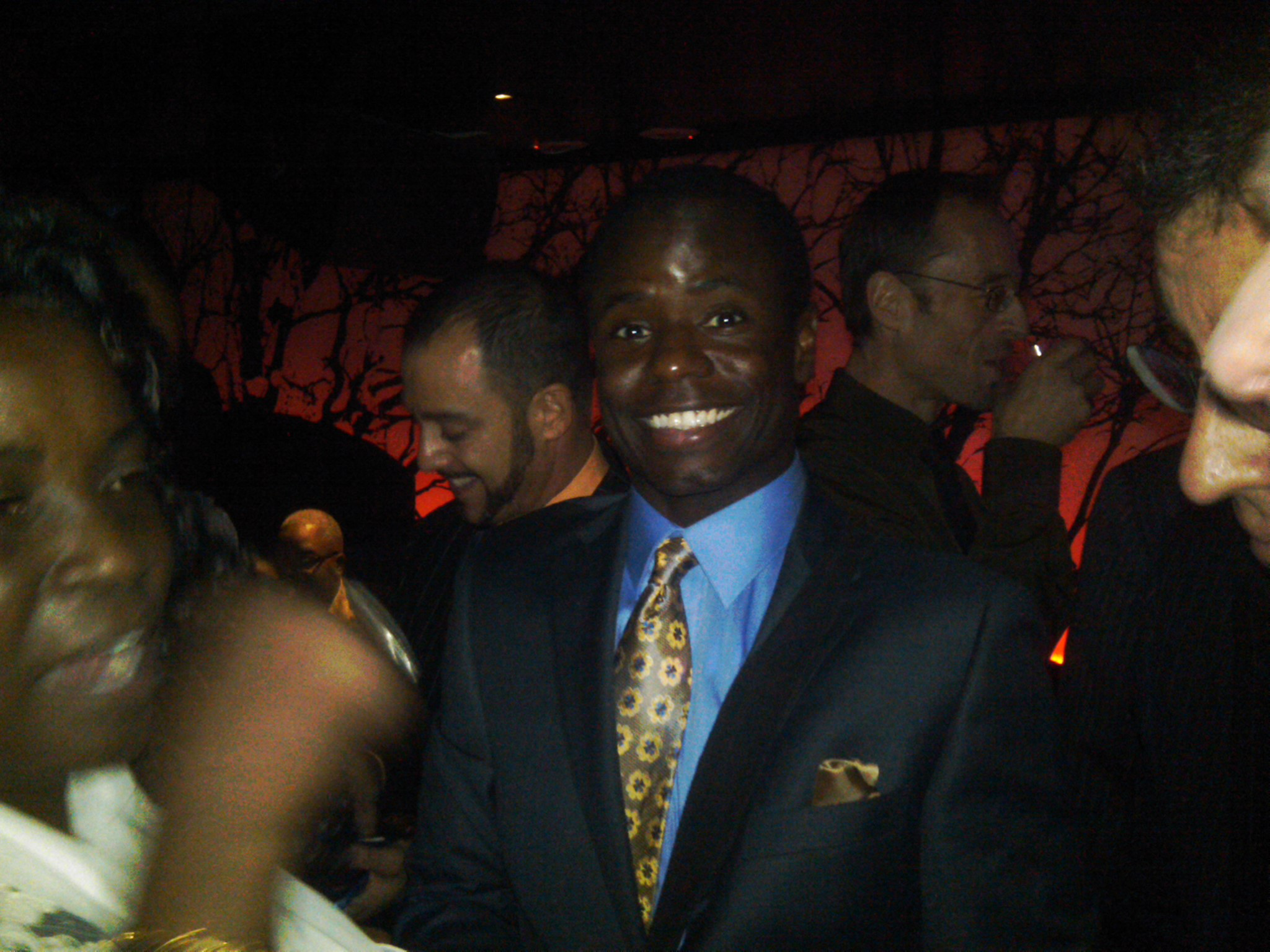
- Born: James Tyrone Lane; December 25, 1977 (age 48); Philadelphia, Pennsylvania
- Other names: James Tyrone, The King of Dance
- Occupations: Actor, dancer, singer
- Years active: 1990-present
- Website: https://www.jamestlane.com/

James T. Lane (born December 25, 1977) is an American actor, singer, and dancer. He made his Broadway debut with the 2006 revival of A Chorus Line, playing Richie Walters. After that, Lane joined the cast of Chicago: The Musical, playing the role of Aaron and Amos Hart. Other credits include an episode on One Life to Live as a James Brown impersonator. In the summer of 2023, Lane brought his autobiographical solo show, Triple Threat, to Theatre Row. Written and performed by Lane, Triple Threat recounted the actor's redemptive journey, from his against-all-odds entertainment rise to near-death cataclysmic fall and his subsequent return. In 2013, Lane reprised his A Chorus Line role in The West End. He is openly gay.

== Early life ==
James T. Lane was born and raised in Philadelphia, Pennsylvania. He attended the Meredith School from kindergarten until 8th grade. During his high school years Lane attended the Girard Academic Music Program. During his teen years, he attended the Ensemble Theatre Community School in Eagles Mere, Pennsylvania. After high school, Lane studied musical theatre at Carnegie-Mellon and Penn State.

== Broadway ==
- A Chorus Line, as Richie Walters, 2006–08
- Chicago: The Musical, as Aaron/Amos Hart/Billy Flynn, 2008–10; 2015; 2023
- The Scottsboro Boys, as Ozie Powell/Ruby Bates, 2010
- King Kong, as Ensemble, 2018
- Kiss Me, Kate, as Paul, 2019
- A Wonderful World, as alternate Louis Armstrong, 2024

== West End ==
- A Chorus Line, as Richie Walters, 2013
- The Scottsboro Boys, as Ozie Powell/Ruby Bates, 2014–15

== Other theatre credits ==
- Triple Threat, as James - Theatre Row, 2023
- Sister Act, as Lt. Eddie Souther - The MUNY, 2023
- Ain't Too Proud: The Life and Times of the Temptations, as Paul Williams - USA tour, 2022
- Chicago: The Musical, as Billy Flynn - The MUNY, 2021
- Mary Poppins, as Bert - Drury Lane Theatre, 2019
- Guys and Dolls, as Nicely Nicely - Virginia Stage Company, 2019
- The Wiz, as Tin Man - Broadway at Music Circus, 2019
- Promenade, as 105 - Encores!, 2019
- The Wiz, as Tin Man - The MUNY, 2018
- Don't Bother Me, I Can't Cope, as James - Encores!, 2018
- Grand Hotel, as Jimmy2 - Encores!, 2018
- The Little Mermaid, as Sebastian - The MUNY, 2017
- Kiss Me, Kate, as Paul - Hartford Stage/Old Globe, 2015
- Jersey Boys, as Barry Belson - USA tour, 2012
- The Scottsboro Boys, as Ozie Powell/Ruby Bates – San Diego, San Francisco, 2012
- Dreamgirls – Prince Music Theatre, 2005
- Cole Porter's The Pirate – Prince Music Theatre, 2006
- Finian's Rainbow - Walnut Street Theatre
- Fame as Tyrone
- Cinderella
