= Hanna Abrazhevich =

Belarusian pair skater (born 2002)

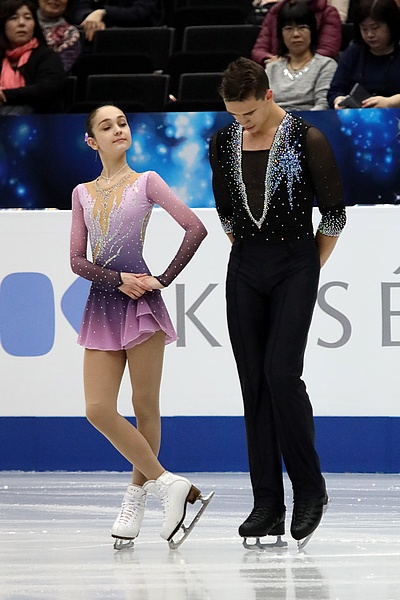
- Abrazhevich/Bidař at the 2019 World Championships

Personal information
- Native name: Ганна Мікалаеўна Абражэвіч (Belarusian)
- Full name: Hanna Mikalayeuna Abrazhevich
- Other names: Anna
- Born: 1 August 2002 (age 23) Minsk, Belarus
- Home town: St. Petersburg, Russia
- Height: 1.64 m (5 ft 4 1/2 in)

Figure skating career
- Country: Czech Republic
- Skating club: ATV Prague
- Began skating: 2008

Hanna Mikalayeuna Abrazhevich (Belarusian: Ганна Мікалаеўна Абражэвіч; born 1 August 2002) is a Belarusian pair skater. Competing for the Czech Republic with her former skating partner, Martin Bidař, she competed in the final segment at the 2019 World Championships.

== Programs ==
Season	Short program	Free skating
2018–2019	Le Di a la Caza Alcance by Michael Nyman performed by Estrella Morente choreo. by Petr Bidař	The Hollywood Wiz (from Cirque du Soleil) by Andreas Carlsson, Brian Bacon choreo. by Dmitri Savin

== Competitive highlights ==
With Bidař for the Czech Republic

International
Event	2018–19
Worlds	18th
Bavarian Open	5th
Ice Mall Cup	4th

Ladies' singles for Belarus

International: Adv. novice
Event	2014–15
Ice Star	12th
Kaunas Cup	5th
Toruń Cup	9th
National
Belarusian Junior	5th

== Detailed results ==
ISU Personal Best highlighted in bold.

With Bidař

**2018–19 season**
Date	Event	SP	FS	Total
18–24 March 2019	2019 World Championships	19; **48.66**	18; **91.36**	19; **140.02**
20–23 February 2019	2019 Open Ice Mall Cup	3; 51.61	4; 99.28	4; 150.89
5–10 February 2019	2019 Bavarian Open	5; 47.96	5; 90.22	5; 138.18
