= 2018–19 figure skating season =

Competitive figure skating year, 2018/7/1 to 2019/6/30

- Date: July 1, 2018 – June 30, 2019
- Previous: 2017–18
- Next: 2019–20

The 2018–19 figure skating season began on July 1, 2018, and ended on June 30, 2019. During this season, elite skaters competed at the 2019 European Championships, Four Continents Championships, World Junior Championships, and World Championships. They also competed at elite events such as the Grand Prix series and Junior Grand Prix series, culminating at the Grand Prix Final, and the Challenger Series.

== Season notes ==
=== Age eligibility ===
Skaters were eligible to compete in International Skating Union (ISU) events at the junior or senior levels according to their age. These rules may not have applied to non-ISU events such as national championships.

Level	Date of birth
Junior (females in all disciplines; males in singles)	Born between July 1, 1999 & June 30, 2005
Junior (males in pairs & ice dance)	Born between July 1, 1997 & June 30, 2005
Senior (all disciplines)	Born before July 1, 2003

== Changes ==
If skaters of different nationalities formed a team, the ISU required that they choose one country to represent. The date provided is the date when the change occurred or, if not available, the date when the change was announced.

=== Partnership changes ===
Date	Skaters	Disc.	Type	Notes	Ref.
July 1, 2018	(South Korea) Kim Kyu-eun / Alex Kang-chan Kam	Pairs	Dissolved		
July 18, 2018	(South Korea) Yura Min / Alexander Gamelin	Ice dance	Dissolved		
July 19, 2018	(Canada) Julianne Séguin / Charlie Bilodeau	Pairs	Dissolved		
July 27, 2018	(France) Lola Esbrat / Andrei Novoselov	Pairs	Dissolved		
August 9, 2018	(Japan) Kana Muramoto / Chris Reed	Ice dance	Dissolved		
August 15, 2018	(Russia) Ksenia Konkina / Grigory Yakushev	Ice dance	Dissolved		
August 15, 2018	(Russia) Sofia Polishchuk / Alexander Vakhnov	Ice dance	Dissolved		
August 15, 2018	(Russia) Ksenia Konkina / Alexander Vakhnov	Ice dance	Formed		
August 15, 2018	(Russia) Sofia Polishchuk / German Shamraev	Ice dance	Formed		
August 22, 2018	(Russia) Amina Atakhanova / Ilia Spiridonov	Pairs	Dissolved		
August 22, 2018	(Russia) Alina Ustimkina / Nikita Volodin	Pairs	Dissolved		
August 22, 2018	(Russia) Amina Atakhanova / Nikita Volodin	Pairs	Formed		
August 22, 2018	(Russia) Lina Kudryavtseva / Ilia Spiridonov	Pairs	Formed		
August 22, 2018	(Russia) Alina Ustimkina / Alexei Rogonov	Pairs	Formed		
August 28, 2018	(United States) Chloe Lewis / Logan Bye	Ice dance	Dissolved	Lewis retired.	
August 31, 2018	(Russia) Ksenia Stolbova / Fedor Klimov	Pairs	Dissolved	Klimov retired.	
September 13, 2018	(Italy) Valentina Marchei / Ondřej Hotárek	Pairs	Dissolved		
September 16, 2018	(Russia) Ksenia Stolbova / Andrei Novoselov	Pairs	Formed	For Russia	
September 21, 2018	(South Korea) Yura Min / Daniel Eaton	Ice dance	Formed	For South Korea	
September 25, 2018	(Czech Republic) Hanna Abrazhevich / Martin Bidař	Pairs	Formed	For the Czech Republic	
October 18, 2018	(South Korea) Kim Kyu-eun / Maxime Deschamps	Pairs	Formed	For South Korea	
October 20, 2018	(Japan) Rikako Fukase / Aru Tateno	Ice dance	Dissolved	Tateno retired.	
November 5, 2018	(Russia) Ksenia Konkina / Alexander Vakhnov	Ice dance	Dissolved		
November 5, 2018	(Russia) Ksenia Konkina / Pavel Drozd	Ice dance	Formed		
November 18, 2018	(France) Natacha Lagouge / Corentin Rahier	Ice dance	Dissolved	Rahier retired.	
December 2018	(Canada) Nadine Wang / Francis Boudreau-Audet	Pairs	Formed	For Canada	
December 2018	(Russia) Alla Loboda / Anton Shibnev	Ice dance	Formed		
March 4, 2019	(Canada) Lubov Ilyushechkina / Charlie Bilodeau	Pairs	Formed		
April 2, 2019	(United States) Rachel Parsons / Michael Parsons	Ice dance	Dissolved	Rachel Parsons retired.	
April 5, 2019	(United States) Eliana Gropman / Ian Somerville	Ice dance	Dissolved		
April 5, 2019	(Canada) Natasha Purich / Bryce Chudak	Pairs	Formed		
April 7, 2019	(United States) Deanna Stellato-Dudek / Nathan Bartholomay	Pairs	Dissolved		
April 8, 2019	(Japan) Miu Suzaki / Ryuichi Kihara	Pairs	Dissolved		
April 15, 2019	(Germany) Annika Hocke / Ruben Blommaert	Pairs	Dissolved		
April 25, 2019	(Israel) Shira Ichilov / Vadim Davidovich	Ice dance	Dissolved		
May 13, 2019	(Russia) Elizaveta Khudaiberdieva / Nikita Nazarov	Ice dance	Dissolved		
May 17, 2019	(Czech Republic) Hanna Abrazhevich / Martin Bidař	Pairs	Dissolved		
May 17, 2019	(Czech Republic) Elizaveta Zhuk / Martin Bidař	Pairs	Formed	For the Czech Republic	
May 18, 2019	(South Korea) Kim Kyu-eun / Maxime Deschamps	Pairs	Dissolved		
May 24, 2019	(Finland) Cecilia Törn / Jussiville Partanen	Ice dance	Dissolved	Törn retired.	
May 31, 2019	(Spain) Laura Barquero / Aritz Maestu	Pairs	Dissolved		
June 13, 2019	(Italy) Carolina Moscheni / Andrea Fabbri	Ice dance	Dissolved	Fabbri retired.	
June 20, 2019	(United States) Caroline Green / Gordon Green	Ice dance	Dissolved	Gordon Green retired.	
June 20, 2019	(United States) Caroline Green / Michael Parsons	Ice dance	Formed		
June 20, 2019	(Japan) Rikako Fukase / Oliver Zhang	Ice dance	Formed	For Japan	
June 26, 2019	(China) Chelsea Liu / Xie Zhong	Pairs	Formed	For China	
June 26, 2019	(Germany) Elena Pavlova / Ruben Blommaert	Pairs	Formed	For Germany	
June 28, 2019	(Russia) Elizaveta Khudaiberdieva / Andrey Filatov	Ice dance	Formed		

=== Retirements ===
Date	Skater(s)	Disc.	Ref.
August 3, 2018	(United States) Grant Hochstein	Men	
August 8, 2018	(Austria) Kerstin Frank	Ladies	
September 5, 2018	(Russia) Fedor Klimov	Pairs	
October 20, 2018	(Japan) Aru Tateno	Ice dance	
November 13, 2018	(China) Li Zijun	Ladies	
November 18, 2018	(France) Corentin Rahier	Ice dance	
November 19, 2018	(United States) Adam Rippon	Men	
November 19, 2018	(Canada) Kevin Reynolds	Men	
January 7, 2019	(United States) Marissa Castelli	Pairs	
January 26, 2019	(Spain) Javier Fernández	Men	
February 13, 2019	(United States) Max Settlage	Pairs	
March 16, 2019	(United Kingdom) Phillip Harris	Men	
March 23, 2019	(Sweden) Alexander Majorov	Men	
April 2, 2019	(United States) Rachel Parsons	Ice dance	
April 17, 2019	(United States) Timothy Dolensky	Men	
April 18, 2019	(United States) Karina Manta / Joseph Johnson	Ice dance	
April 23, 2019	(Russia) Maxim Kovtun	Men	
May 2, 2019	(Canada) Kaetlyn Osmond	Ladies	
May 7, 2019	(United States) Angela Wang	Ladies	
May 10, 2019	(Canada) Larkyn Austman	Ladies	
May 14, 2019	(Norway) Camilla Gjersem	Ladies	
May 24, 2019	(Finland) Cecilia Törn	Ice dance	
May 31, 2019	(Russia) Polina Tsurskaya	Ladies	
June 6, 2019	(United States) Chloe Lewis	Ice dance	
June 7, 2019	(Germany) Joti Polizoakis	Ice dance	
June 11, 2019	(South Korea) Park So-youn	Ladies	
June 13, 2019	(Italy) Andrea Fabbri	Ice dance	
June 16, 2019	(Israel) Aimee Buchanan	Ladies	

=== Coaching changes ===
Date	Skater(s)	Disc.	From	To	Ref.
July 12, 2018	(Russia) Anastasia Tarakanova	Ladies	Eteri Tutberidze, Sergei Dudakov & Daniil Gleikhengauz	Evgeni Plushenko & Ksenia Ivanova	
July 25, 2018	(Russia) Daria Panenkova	Ladies	Eteri Tutberidze, Sergei Dudakov & Daniil Gleikhengauz	Anna Tsareva	
August 6, 2018	(Canada) Joseph Phan	Men	Yvan Desjardins & Violane Emard	Brian Orser & Tracy Wilson	
August 31, 2018	(United States) Angela Wang	Ladies	Christy Krall, Ryan Bradley & Erik Schulz	Ravi Walia	
September 7, 2018	(United States) Tarah Kayne / Danny O'Shea	Pairs	Jim Peterson & Amanda Evora	Dalilah Sappenfield	
September 12, 2018	(Canada) Kaitlyn Weaver / Andrew Poje	Ice dance	Nikolai Morozov	Nikolai Morozov, Igor Shpilband & Pasquale Camerlengo	
September 25, 2018	(France) Maé-Bérénice Méité	Ladies	Shanetta Folle	John Zimmerman & Silvia Fontana	
October 13, 2018	(Japan) Rika Hongo	Ladies	Hiroshi Nagakubo, Yoriko Naruse & Miho Kawaume	Joanne McLeod, Megumu Seki & Neil Wilson	
October 20, 2018	(United States) Alexa Scimeca Knierim / Chris Knierim	Pairs	Aljona Savchenko	Todd Sand & Jenni Meno	
November 4, 2018	(Russia) Anna Pogorilaya	Ladies	Anna Tsareva	Viktoria Butsayeva	
November 27, 2018	(Poland) Ekaterina Kurakova	Ladies	Inna Goncharenko	Brian Orser	
March 2019	(Russia) Alena Kanysheva	Ladies	Svetlana Panova & Tatiana Moiseeva	Eteri Tutberidze, Sergei Dudakov & Daniil Gleikhengauz	
April 6, 2019	(Russia) Maria Sotskova	Ladies	Elena Buianova	Svetlana Sokolovskaya	
April 15, 2019	(Russia) Anastasia Tarakanova	Ladies	Evgeni Plushenko & Ksenia Ivanova	Svetlana Panova & Tatiana Moiseeva	
April 24, 2019	(United States) Camden Pulkinen	Men	Tom Zakrajsek	Damon Allen & Tammy Gambill	
April 29, 2019	(Russia) Evgenia Tarasova / Vladimir Morozov	Pairs	Maxim Trankov & Nina Mozer	Marina Zoueva & Nina Mozer	
May 10, 2019	(Canada) Stephen Gogolev	Men	Lee Barkell	Rafael Arutyunyan & Lee Barkell	
June 3, 2019	(Japan) Shoma Uno	Men	Machiko Yamada & Mihoko Higuchi	Stéphane Lambiel	
June 25, 2019	(United States) Vincent Zhou	Men	Tom Zakrajsek, Tammy Gambill & Christy Krall	Tammy Gambill & Mie Hamada	
June 25, 2019	(Canada) Gabrielle Daleman	Ladies	Lee Barkell, Brian Orser & Tracy Wilson	Lee Barkell	

=== Nationality changes ===
Date	Skater(s)	Disc.	From	To	Notes	Ref.
July 16, 2018	Maurizio Zandron	Men	Italy	Austria		
September 16, 2018	Andrei Novoselov	Pairs	France	Russia	Partnering with Ksenia Stolbova	
September 21, 2018	Daniel Eaton	Ice dance	United States	South Korea	Partnering with Yura Min	
September 25, 2018	Hanna Abrazhevich	Pairs	Belarus	Czech Republic	Partnering with Martin Bidař	
October 18, 2018	Maxime Deschamps	Pairs	Canada	South Korea	Partnering with Kim Kyu-eun	
November 27, 2018	Ekaterina Kurakova	Ladies	Russia	Poland		
December 2018	Francis Boudreau-Audet	Pairs	Japan	Canada	Partnering with Nadine Wang	
May 17, 2019	Elizaveta Zhuk	Pairs	Russia	Czech Republic	Partnering with Martin Bidař	
May 23, 2019	Anastasiia Shabotova	Ladies	Russia	Ukraine		
June 26, 2019	Chelsea Liu	Pairs	United States	China	Partnering with Xie Zhong	

== International competitions ==
Code key

- S – Senior event
- J – Junior event
- N – Novice event
- M – Men's singles
- L – Ladies' singles
- P – Pair skating
- D – Ice dance

Color key

- ISU Championships
- Grand Prix or Junior Grand Prix
- Challenger Series
- Other competition

2018
Dates	Event	Type	Level	Disc.	Location	Results
July 24–28	Lake Placid Ice Dance International	Other	All	D	Lake Placid, New York, United States	Details 1, 2
July 30 – August 5	Philadelphia Summer International	Other	Senior	M/L	Philadelphia, Pennsylvania, United States	Details
August 1–5	Asian Open Trophy	Challenger	Senior	M/L/D	Bangkok, Thailand	Details 1, 2
August 1–5	Asian Open Trophy	Other	Senior	P	Bangkok, Thailand	Details 1, 2
August 9–12	NRW Trophy	Other	S/N	D	Dortmund, Germany	Details
August 9–12	NRW Trophy	Other	Junior	M/L/D	Dortmund, Germany	Details
August 22–25	JGP Slovakia	Grand Prix	Junior	All	Bratislava, Slovakia	Details
August 29 – September 1	JGP Austria	Grand Prix	Junior	All	Linz, Austria	Details
September 5–8	JGP Lithuania	Grand Prix	Junior	M/L/D	Kaunas, Lithuania	Details
September 12–15	JGP Canada	Grand Prix	Junior	All	Richmond, British Columbia, Canada	Details
September 12–16	Lombardia Trophy	Challenger	Senior	All	Bergamo, Italy	Details
September 12–16	U.S. International Classic	Challenger	Senior	All	Salt Lake City, Utah, United States	Details
September 19–22	Ondrej Nepela Trophy	Challenger	Senior	M/L/D	Bratislava, Slovakia	Details
September 19–22	Ondrej Nepela Trophy	Other	Senior	P	Bratislava, Slovakia	Details
September 20–22	Autumn Classic International	Challenger	Senior	All	Oakville, Ontario, Canada	Details
September 26–29	JGP Czech Republic	Grand Prix	Junior	All	Ostrava, Czech Republic	Details
September 26–29	Nebelhorn Trophy	Challenger	Senior	All	Oberstdorf, Germany	Details
October 3–6	JGP Slovenia	Grand Prix	Junior	M/L/D	Ljubljana, Slovenia	Details
October 4–7	Finlandia Trophy	Challenger	Senior	All	Espoo, Finland	Details
October 6	Japan Open	Other	Senior	M/L	Saitama, Japan	Details
October 10–13	JGP Armenia	Grand Prix	Junior	M/L/D	Yerevan, Armenia	Details
October 18–21	Ice Star	Other	S/J	All	Minsk, Belarus	Details
October 19–21	Halloween Cup	Other	All	M/L/D	Budapest, Hungary	Details
October 19–21	Skate America	Grand Prix	Senior	All	Everett, Washington, United States	Details
October 24–28	Golden Bear of Zagreb	Other	All	M/L	Zagreb, Croatia	Details
October 24–28	Crystal Skate of Romania	Other	All	M/L	Otopeni, Romania	Details
October 26–28	Skate Canada International	Grand Prix	Senior	All	Laval, Quebec, Canada	Details
November 1–4	Tirnavia Ice Cup	Other	J/N	M/L	Trnava, Slovakia	Details
November 2–4	Grand Prix of Helsinki	Grand Prix	Senior	All	Helsinki, Finland	Details
November 7–11	Volvo Open Cup	Other	All	All	Riga, Latvia	Details
November 9–11	NHK Trophy	Grand Prix	Senior	All	Hiroshima, Japan	Details
November 9–11	Pavel Roman Memorial	Other	All	D	Olomouc, Czech Republic	Details
November 9–11	Riedell Ice Cup	Other	J/N	M/L/P	Prague, Czech Republic	Details
November 11–18	Alpen Trophy	Challenger	Senior	M/L/D	Innsbruck, Austria	Details 1, 2
November 11–18	Alpen Trophy	Other	Senior	P	Innsbruck, Austria	Details 1, 2
November 16–18	Rostelecom Cup	Grand Prix	Senior	All	Moscow, Russia	Details
November 21–25	Skate Celje	Other	J/N	M/L	Celje, Slovenia	Details
November 22–25	Warsaw Cup	Other	Senior	M/L/D	Warsaw, Poland	Details
November 23–25	Internationaux de France	Grand Prix	Senior	All	Grenoble, France	Details
November 26 – December 2	Tallinn Trophy	Challenger	Senior	All	Tallinn, Estonia	Details
November 27 – December 2	Bosphorous Cup	Other	All	M/L/D	Istanbul, Turkey	Details
November 27 – December 2	Denkova-Staviski Cup	Other	All	M/L	Sofia, Bulgaria	Details
November 28 – December 2	Open d'Andorra	Other	All	M/L/D	Canillo, Andorra	Details
November 29 – December 2	Christmas Cup	Other	S/J	M/L/D	Budapest, Hungary	Details
December 5–8	Golden Spin of Zagreb	Challenger	Senior	All	Zagreb, Croatia	Details
December 6–9	Grand Prix Final	Grand Prix	S/J	All	Vancouver, British Columbia, Canada	Details
December 14–16	Grand Prix of Bratislava	Other	J/N	All	Bratislava, Slovakia	Details
December 14–18	Russian-Chinese Youth Winter Games	Other	Junior	All	Ufa, Russia	Details

2019
Dates	Event	Type	Level	Disc.	Location	Results
January 8–12	Mentor Cup	Other	All	M/L/D	Toruń, Poland	Details
January 9–12	EduSport Trophy	Other	All	M/L	Târgu Secuiesc, Romania	Details
January 15–19	Skate Helena	Other	All	M/L	Belgrade, Serbia	Details
January 21–27	European Championships	Championships	Senior	All	Minsk, Belarus	Details
January 31 - February 3	Reykjavík International Games	Other	Senior	L	Reykjavík, Iceland	Details
January 31 - February 3	Reykjavík International Games	Other	Junior	M/L	Reykjavík, Iceland	Details
February 1–3	Egna Dance Trophy	Other	All	D	Egna, Italy	Details
February 5–10	Sofia Trophy	Other	All	M/L	Sofia, Bulgaria	Details
February 5–10	Bavarian Open	Other	All	All	Oberstdorf, Germany	Details
February 6–10	Nordic Championships	Other	All	M/L	Linköping, Sweden	Details
February 7–10	Four Continents Championships	Championships	Senior	All	Anaheim, California, United States	Details
February 7–10	Dragon Trophy & Tivoli Cup	Other	All	M/L	Ljubljana, Slovenia	Details
February 8–17	Children of Asia International Sports Games	Other	Junior	M/L	Yuzhno-Sakhalinsk, Russia	Details
February 9–16	European Youth Olympic Winter Festival	Other	Junior	M/L	Sarajevo, Bosnia and Herzegovina	Details
February 15–17	Jégvirág Cup	Other	All	M/L/D	Miskolc, Hungary	Details
February 20–23	Open Ice Mall Cup	Other	All	All	Eilat, Israel	Details
February 20–24	Tallink Hotels Cup	Other	All	M/L	Tallinn, Estonia	Details
February 21–24	International Challenge Cup	Other	All	M/L/P	The Hague, Netherlands	Details
February 25 – March 3	Cup of Tyrol	Other	All	M/L	Innsbruck, Austria	Details
March 2–12	Winter Universiade	Other	Senior	All	Krasnoyarsk, Russia	Details Details
March 4–10	World Junior Championships	Championships	Junior	All	Zagreb, Croatia	Details
March 15–17	Coupe du Printemps	Other	All	M/L	Kockelscheuer, Luxembourg	Details
March 18–24	World Championships	Championships	Senior	All	Saitama, Japan	Details
March 28–31	Egna Spring Trophy	Other	All	M/L/P	Egna, Italy	Details
April 8–14	Triglav Trophy & Narcisa Cup	Other	All	M/L	Jesenice, Slovenia	Details
April 9–14	Skate Victoria	Other	All	M/L	Sofia, Bulgaria	Details
April 11–14	World Team Trophy	Other	Senior	All	Fukuoka, Japan	Details

== International medalists ==
=== Men's singles ===
Championships
Competition	Gold	Silver	Bronze	Results
(Belarus) European Championships	(Spain) Javier Fernández	(Russia) Alexander Samarin	(Italy) Matteo Rizzo	Results
(United States) Four Continents Championships	(Japan) Shoma Uno	(China) Jin Boyang	(United States) Vincent Zhou	Results
(Croatia) World Junior Championships	(United States) Tomoki Hiwatashi	(Russia) Roman Savosin	(Italy) Daniel Grassl	Results
(Japan) World Championships	(United States) Nathan Chen	(Japan) Yuzuru Hanyu	(United States) Vincent Zhou	Results

Grand Prix
Competition	Gold	Silver	Bronze	Results
(United States) Skate America	(United States) Nathan Chen	(Czech Republic) Michal Březina	(Russia) Sergei Voronov	Results
Skate Canada International	(Japan) Shoma Uno	(Canada) Keegan Messing	(South Korea) Cha Jun-hwan	Results
(Finland) Grand Prix of Helsinki	(Japan) Yuzuru Hanyu	(Czech Republic) Michal Březina	(South Korea) Cha Jun-hwan	Results
(Japan) NHK Trophy	(Japan) Shoma Uno	(Russia) Sergei Voronov	(Italy) Matteo Rizzo	Results
(Russia) Rostelecom Cup	(Japan) Yuzuru Hanyu	(Georgia (country)) Moris Kvitelashvili	(Japan) Kazuki Tomono	Results
Internationaux de France	(United States) Nathan Chen	(United States) Jason Brown	(Russia) Alexander Samarin	Results
(Canada) Grand Prix Final	(United States) Nathan Chen	(Japan) Shoma Uno	(South Korea) Cha Jun-hwan	Results

Junior Grand Prix
Competition	Gold	Silver	Bronze	Results
JGP Slovakia	(Canada) Stephen Gogolev	(Japan) Mitsuki Sumoto	(Italy) Daniel Grassl	Results
JGP Austria	(United States) Camden Pulkinen	(Japan) Koshiro Shimada	(Russia) Roman Savosin	Results
JGP Lithuania	(United States) Andrew Torgashev	(Russia) Kirill Iakovlev	(Japan) Yuto Kishina	Results
JGP Canada	(Russia) Petr Gumennik	(United States) Tomoki Hiwatashi	(France) Adam Siao Him Fa	Results
JGP Czech Republic	(Russia) Andrei Mozalev	(United States) Camden Pulkinen	(Canada) Joseph Phan	Results
JGP Slovenia	(Russia) Petr Gumennik	(United States) Tomoki Hiwatashi	(Japan) Koshiro Shimada	Results
JGP Armenia	(France) Adam Siao Him Fa	(Japan) Yuma Kagiyama	(Canada) Iliya Kovler	Results
(Canada) JGP Final	(Canada) Stephen Gogolev	(Russia) Petr Gumennik	(Japan) Koshiro Shimada	Results

Challenger Series
Competition	Gold	Silver	Bronze	Results
(Thailand) Asian Open Trophy	(Japan) Sōta Yamamoto	(Chinese Taipei) Tsao Chih-i	(South Korea) Byun Se-jong	Results
(Italy) Lombardia Trophy	(Japan) Shoma Uno	(Russia) Dmitri Aliev	(Russia) Andrei Lazukin	Results
(United States) U.S. International Classic	(Canada) Nam Nguyen	(Czech Republic) Michal Březina	(United States) Jimmy Ma	Results
(Slovakia) Ondrej Nepela Trophy	(Russia) Mikhail Kolyada	(Russia) Sergei Voronov	(Japan) Keiji Tanaka	Results
(Canada) Autumn Classic International	(Japan) Yuzuru Hanyu	(South Korea) Cha Jun-hwan	(Canada) Roman Sadovsky	Results
(Germany) Nebelhorn Trophy	(Canada) Keegan Messing	(Sweden) Alexander Majorov	(Russia) Artur Dmitriev	Results
(Finland) Finlandia Trophy	(Russia) Mikhail Kolyada	(South Korea) Cha Jun-hwan	(Georgia (country)) Morisi Kvitelashvili	Results
(Austria) Alpen Trophy	(Italy) Daniel Grassl	(Canada) Roman Sadovsky	(United States) Tomoki Hiwatashi	Results
(Estonia) Tallinn Trophy	(Russia) Maxim Kovtun	(United States) Vincent Zhou	(Russia) Anton Shulepov	Results
(Croatia) Golden Spin of Zagreb	(United States) Jason Brown	(Russia) Mikhail Kolyada	(Russia) Alexander Samarin	Results

Other international competitions
Competition	Gold	Silver	Bronze	Results
(United States) Philadelphia Summer International	(United States) Andrew Torgashev	(United States) Jimmy Ma	(United States) Timothy Dolensky	Results
(Belarus) Ice Star	(Latvia) Deniss Vasiļjevs	(Azerbaijan) Vladimir Litvintsev	(Armenia) Slavik Hayrapetyan	Results
(Hungary) Halloween Cup	(Australia) Brendan Kerry	(United Kingdom) Graham Newberry	(Hungary) Alexander Maszljanko	Results
Crystal Skate of Romania	(Slovakia) Marco Klepoch	(Austria) Manuel Drechsler	(Romania) Andrei Tanase	Results
(Croatia) Golden Bear of Zagreb	(Italy) Daniel Grassl	(Germany) Paul Fentz	(Italy) Jari Kessler	Results
(Latvia) Volvo Open Cup	(Azerbaijan) Vladimir Litvintsev	(Israel) Mark Gorodnitsky	(Ukraine) Ivan Shmuratko	Results
(Poland) Warsaw Cup	(Italy) Daniel Grassl	(Chinese Taipei) Chih-I Tsao	(Australia) Andrew Dodds	Results
(Turkey) Bosphorous Cup	(Georgia (country)) Morisi Kvitelashvili	(Ukraine) Ivan Shmuratko	(Turkey) Başar Oktar	Results
(Bulgaria) Denkova-Staviski Cup	(Italy) Matteo Rizzo	(Bulgaria) Nicky-Leo Obreykov	(Norway) Sondre Oddvoll Bøe	Results
Open d'Andorra	(Spain) Héctor Alonso Serrano	No other competitors		Results
(Hungary) Christmas Cup	(Russia) Egor Murashov	(Czech Republic) Daniel Mrázek	(Hungary) Alexander Borovoj	Results
(Poland) Mentor Cup	(Australia) Brendan Kerry	(Italy) Gabriele Frangipani	(United Kingdom) Graham Newberry	Results
(Romania) EduSport Trophy	(Philippines) Christopher Caluza	(Bulgaria) Nicky-Leo Obreykov	(Slovakia) Michael Neuman	Results
(Serbia) Skate Helena	(Russia) Petr Gumennik	(Hungary) Alexander Maszljanko	No other competitors	Results
(Bulgaria) Sofia Trophy	(Russia) Egor Murashov	(Italy) Mattia Dalla Torre	(Slovakia) Michael Neuman	Results
(Sweden) Nordic Championships	(Norway) Sondre Oddvoll Bøe	(Sweden) Alexander Majorov	(Estonia) Aleksandr Selevko	Results
(Slovenia) Dragon Trophy	(Russia) Alexander Petrov	(Russia) Andrei Lazukin	(Turkey) Burak Demirboğa	Results
(Germany) Bavarian Open	(Japan) Koshiro Shimada	(Canada) Conrad Orzel	(United Kingdom) Peter-James Hallam	Results
(Hungary) Jégvirág Cup	(Switzerland) Nicola Todeschini	(Estonia) Aleksandr Selevko	(Belarus) Alexander Lebedev	Results
(Israel) Open Ice Mall Cup	(Israel) Daniel Samohin	(Israel) Oleksii Bychenko	(Bulgaria) Nicky-Leo Obreykov	Results
(Estonia) Tallink Hotels Cup	(Russia) Mikhail Kolyada	(Estonia) Aleksandr Selevko	(Estonia) Daniel-Albert Naurits	Results
(Netherlands) International Challenge Cup	(Japan) Sōta Yamamoto	(Japan) Yuma Kagiyama	(Switzerland) Lukas Britschgi	Results
(Austria) Cup of Tyrol	(Latvia) Deniss Vasiļjevs	(Austria) Maurizio Zandron	(Russia) Egor Murashov	Results
(Russia) Winter Universiade	(Italy) Matteo Rizzo	(Russia) Maxim Kovtun	(Georgia (country)) Morisi Kvitelashvili	Results
(Luxembourg) Coupe du Printemps	(Japan) Sena Miyake	(Monaco) Davide Lewton-Brain	(Austria) Maurizio Zandron	Results
(Italy) Egna Spring Trophy	(United States) Alexei Krasnozhon	(United States) Andrew Torgashev	(Switzerland) Nicola Todeschini	Results
(Slovenia) Triglav Trophy	(Hungary) András Csernoch	(Hungary) Alexander Maszljanko	(Mexico) Diego Saldaña	Results
(Bulgaria) Skate Victoria	(Austria) Maurizio Zandron	(Belarus) Alexander Lebedev	(Bulgaria) Alexander Zlatkov	Results

=== Ladies' singles ===
Championships
Competition	Gold	Silver	Bronze	Results
(Belarus) European Championships	(Russia) Sofia Samodurova	(Russia) Alina Zagitova	(Finland) Viveca Lindfors	Results
(United States) Four Continents Championships	(Japan) Rika Kihira	(Kazakhstan) Elizabet Tursynbaeva	(Japan) Mai Mihara	Results
(Croatia) World Junior Championships	(Russia) Alexandra Trusova	(Russia) Anna Shcherbakova	(United States) Ting Cui	Results
(Japan) World Championships	(Russia) Alina Zagitova	(Kazakhstan) Elizabet Tursynbaeva	(Russia) Evgenia Medvedeva	Results

Grand Prix
Competition	Gold	Silver	Bronze	Results
(United States) Skate America	(Japan) Satoko Miyahara	(Japan) Kaori Sakamoto	(Russia) Sofia Samodurova	Results
Skate Canada International	(Russia) Elizaveta Tuktamysheva	(Japan) Mako Yamashita	(Russia) Evgenia Medvedeva	Results
(Finland) Grand Prix of Helsinki	(Russia) Alina Zagitova	(Russia) Stanislava Konstantinova	(Japan) Kaori Sakamoto	Results
(Japan) NHK Trophy	(Japan) Rika Kihira	(Japan) Satoko Miyahara	(Russia) Elizaveta Tuktamysheva	Results
(Russia) Rostelecom Cup	(Russia) Alina Zagitova	(Russia) Sofia Samodurova	(South Korea) Lim Eun-soo	Results
Internationaux de France	(Japan) Rika Kihira	(Japan) Mai Mihara	(United States) Bradie Tennell	Results
(Canada) Grand Prix Final	(Japan) Rika Kihira	(Russia) Alina Zagitova	(Russia) Elizaveta Tuktamysheva	Results

Junior Grand Prix
Competition	Gold	Silver	Bronze	Results
JGP Slovakia	(Russia) Anna Shcherbakova	(Russia) Anna Tarusina	(South Korea) You Young	Results
JGP Austria	(Russia) Alena Kostornaia	(Russia) Alena Kanysheva	(Japan) Shiika Yoshioka	Results
JGP Lithuania	(Russia) Alexandra Trusova	(South Korea) Kim Ye-lim	(Russia) Kseniia Sinitsyna	Results
JGP Canada	(Russia) Anna Shcherbakova	(Russia) Anastasia Tarakanova	(Japan) Rion Sumiyoshi	Results
JGP Czech Republic	(Russia) Alena Kostornaia	(South Korea) Kim Ye-lim	(Russia) Viktoria Vasilieva	Results
JGP Slovenia	(Russia) Anastasia Tarakanova	(Russia) Anna Tarusina	(South Korea) Lee Hae-in	Results
JGP Armenia	(Russia) Alexandra Trusova	(Russia) Alena Kanysheva	(Japan) Yuhana Yokoi	Results
(Canada) JGP Final	(Russia) Alena Kostornaia	(Russia) Alexandra Trusova	(Russia) Alena Kanysheva	Results

Challenger Series
Competition	Gold	Silver	Bronze	Results
(Thailand) Asian Open Trophy	(South Korea) Lim Eun-soo	(Japan) Yuna Shiraiwa	(Japan) Mako Yamashita	Results
(Italy) Lombardia Trophy	(Russia) Elizaveta Tuktamysheva	(Russia) Sofia Samodurova	(Japan) Mako Yamashita	Results
(United States) U.S. International Classic	(Japan) Satoko Miyahara	(South Korea) Lim Eun-soo	(South Korea) Kim Ye-lim	Results
(Slovakia) Ondrej Nepela Trophy	(Japan) Rika Kihira	(Kazakhstan) Elizabet Tursynbaeva	(Russia) Stanislava Konstantinova	Results
(Canada) Autumn Classic International	(United States) Bradie Tennell	(Russia) Evgenia Medvedeva	(France) Maé-Bérénice Méité	Results
(Germany) Nebelhorn Trophy	(Russia) Alina Zagitova	(Japan) Mai Mihara	(Belgium) Loena Hendrickx	Results
(Finland) Finlandia Trophy	(Russia) Elizaveta Tuktamysheva	(Kazakhstan) Elizabet Tursynbaeva	(Finland) Viveca Lindfors	Results
(Austria) Alpen Trophy	(Russia) Anna Tarusina	(Russia) Serafima Sakhanovich	(Australia) Brooklee Han	Results
(Estonia) Tallinn Trophy	(Russia) Serafima Sakhanovich	(United States) Ting Cui	(Finland) Viveca Lindfors	Results
(Croatia) Golden Spin of Zagreb	(United States) Bradie Tennell	(Russia) Anastasiia Gubanova	(United States) Mariah Bell	Results

Other international competitions
Competition	Gold	Silver	Bronze	Results
(United States) Philadelphia Summer International	(United States) Katie McBeath	(United States) Akari Nakahara	(United States) Brynne McIsaac	Results
(Belarus) Ice Star	(Azerbaijan) Ekaterina Ryabova	(France) Léa Serna	(Norway) Camilla Gjersem	Results
(Hungary) Halloween Cup	(Switzerland) Alexia Paganini	(Sweden) Anita Östlund	(Hungary) Ivett Tóth	Results
Crystal Skate of Romania	(Bulgaria) Alexandra Feigin	(Romania) Julia Sauter	(Czech Republic) Eliška Březinová	Results
(Croatia) Golden Bear of Zagreb	(United Kingdom) Natasha McKay	(Italy) Elettra Olivotto	(Germany) Alissa Scheidt	Results
(Latvia) Volvo Open Cup	(Hungary) Ivett Tóth	(United Kingdom) Karly Robertson	(United Kingdom) Kristen Spours	Results
(Poland) Warsaw Cup	(Russia) Anastasiia Guliakova	(Australia) Kailani Craine	(Poland) Elżbieta Gabryszak	Results
(Turkey) Bosphorous Cup	(Philippines) Alisson Krystle Perticheto	(Italy) Lara Naki Gutmann	(Netherlands) Niki Wories	Results
(Bulgaria) Denkova-Staviski Cup	(Bulgaria) Alexandra Feigin	(Italy) Lucrezia Gennaro	(Italy) Sara Conti	Results
Open d'Andorra	(Spain) Valentina Matos	(Spain) Laia Bertran	(Andorra) Tania Margarido Pereira	Results
(Hungary) Christmas Cup	(Hungary) Ivett Tóth	(Finland) Jenni Saarinen	(Italy) Elisabetta Leccardi	Results
(Poland) Mentor Cup	(Italy) Marina Piredda	(Brazil) Isadora Williams	(Finland) Linnea Ceder	Results
(Romania) EduSport Trophy	(Czech Republic) Eliška Březinová	(Philippines) Alisson Krystle Perticheto	(Italy) Chenny Paolucci	Results
(Serbia) Skate Helena	(Serbia) Antonina Dubinina	(Italy) Anna Memola	(Austria) Victoria Hübler	Results
(Iceland) Reykjavík International Games	(Switzerland) Tanja Odermatt	(Kazakhstan) Aiza Imambek	(Azerbaijan) Morgan Flood	Results
(Bulgaria) Sofia Trophy	(Bulgaria) Alexandra Feigin	(Italy) Lucrezia Gennaro	(Italy) Sara Conti	Results
(Sweden) Nordic Championships	(Finland) Jenni Saarinen	(Estonia) Gerli Liinamäe	(Finland) Vera Stolt	Results
(Slovenia) Dragon Trophy	(Russia) Elizaveta Tuktamysheva	(Russia) Anastasiia Guliakova	(Italy) Marina Piredda	Results
(Germany) Bavarian Open	(Japan) Satoko Miyahara	(Japan) Yuna Aoki	(Canada) Aurora Cotop	Results
(Hungary) Jégvirág Cup	(Ukraine) Anastasia Gozhva	(Germany) Nicole Schott	(Azerbaijan) Morgan Flood	Results
(Israel) Open Ice Mall Cup	(Switzerland) Yasmine Kimiko Yamada	(Italy) Lucrezia Gennaro	(Armenia) Anastasia Galustyan	Results
(Estonia) Tallink Hotels Cup	(Estonia) Eva-Lotta Kiibus	(Russia) Anastasiia Kolomiets	(Finland) Vera Stolt	Results
(Netherlands) International Challenge Cup	(Japan) Rika Kihira	(United States) Starr Andrews	(Japan) Wakaba Higuchi	Results
(Austria) Cup of Tyrol	(France) Laurine Lecavelier	(Germany) Nicole Schott	(Italy) Marina Piredda	Results
(Russia) Winter Universiade	(Japan) Mai Mihara	(Kazakhstan) Elizabet Tursynbaeva	(Russia) Stanislava Konstantinova	Results
(Luxembourg) Coupe du Printemps	(Sweden) Josefin Taljegård	(Netherlands) Caya Scheepens	(United Kingdom) Bethany Powell	Results
(Italy) Egna Spring Trophy	(United States) Gabriella Izzo	(United States) Starr Andrews	(Italy) Marina Piredda	Results
(Slovenia) Triglav Trophy	(Italy) Elettra Maria Olivotto	(Liechtenstein) Romana Kaiser	(Slovenia) Maruša Udrih	Results
(Bulgaria) Skate Victoria	(Russia) Anastasiia Guliakova	(Bulgaria) Alexandra Feigin	(Italy) Chenny Paolucci	Results

=== Pairs ===
Championships
Competition	Gold	Silver	Bronze	Results
(Belarus) European Championships	(France) Vanessa James / Morgan Ciprès	(Russia) Evgenia Tarasova / Vladimir Morozov	(Russia) Aleksandra Boikova / Dmitrii Kozlovskii	Results
(United States) Four Continents Championships	(China) Sui Wenjing / Han Cong	(Canada) Kirsten Moore-Towers / Michael Marinaro	(China) Peng Cheng / Jin Yang	Results
(Croatia) World Junior Championships	(Russia) Anastasia Mishina / Aleksandr Galliamov	(Russia) Apollinariia Panfilova / Dmitry Rylov	(Russia) Polina Kostiukovich / Dmitrii Ialin	Results
(Japan) World Championships	(China) Sui Wenjing / Han Cong	(Russia) Evgenia Tarasova / Vladimir Morozov	(Russia) Natalia Zabiiako / Alexander Enbert	Results

Grand Prix
Competition	Gold	Silver	Bronze	Results
(United States) Skate America	(Russia) Evgenia Tarasova / Vladimir Morozov	(Russia) Alisa Efimova / Alexander Korovin	(United States) Ashley Cain / Timothy LeDuc	Results
Skate Canada International	(France) Vanessa James / Morgan Ciprès	(China) Peng Cheng / Jin Yang	(Canada) Kirsten Moore-Towers / Michael Marinaro	Results
(Finland) Grand Prix of Helsinki	(Russia) Natalia Zabiiako / Alexander Enbert	(Italy) Nicole Della Monica / Matteo Guarise	(Russia) Daria Pavliuchenko / Denis Khodykin	Results
(Japan) NHK Trophy	(Russia) Natalia Zabiiako / Alexander Enbert	(China) Peng Cheng / Jin Yang	(United States) Alexa Scimeca Knierim / Chris Knierim	Results
(Russia) Rostelecom Cup	(Russia) Evgenia Tarasova / Vladimir Morozov	(Italy) Nicole Della Monica / Matteo Guarise	(Russia) Daria Pavliuchenko / Denis Khodykin	Results
Internationaux de France	(France) Vanessa James / Morgan Ciprès	(United States) Tarah Kayne / Danny O'Shea	(Russia) Aleksandra Boikova / Dmitrii Kozlovskii	Results
(Canada) Grand Prix Final	(France) Vanessa James / Morgan Ciprès	(China) Peng Cheng / Jin Yang	(Russia) Evgenia Tarasova / Vladimir Morozov	Results

Junior Grand Prix
Competition	Gold	Silver	Bronze	Results
JGP Slovakia	(Russia) Anastasia Mishina / Aleksandr Galliamov	(Russia) Apollinariia Panfilova / Dmitry Rylov	(Russia) Kseniia Akhanteva / Valerii Kolesov	Results
JGP Austria	(Russia) Polina Kostiukovich / Dmitrii Ialin	(Russia) Anastasia Poluianova / Dmitry Sopot	(Russia) Alina Pepeleva / Roman Pleshkov	Results
JGP Canada	(Russia) Anastasia Mishina / Aleksandr Galliamov	(Russia) Apollinariia Panfilova / Dmitry Rylov	(Russia) Daria Kvartalova / Alexei Sviatchenko	Results
JGP Czech Republic	(Russia) Kseniia Akhanteva / Valerii Kolesov	(Russia) Polina Kostiukovich / Dmitrii Ialin	(United States) Sarah Feng / TJ Nyman	Results
(Canada) JGP Final	(Russia) Anastasia Mishina / Aleksandr Galliamov	(Russia) Polina Kostiukovich / Dmitrii Ialin	(Russia) Apollinariia Panfilova / Dmitry Rylov	Results

Challenger Series
Competition	Gold	Silver	Bronze	Results
(Italy) Lombardia Trophy	(Russia) Natalia Zabiiako / Alexander Enbert	(Russia) Aleksandra Boikova / Dmitrii Kozlovskii	(Italy) Nicole Della Monica / Matteo Guarise	Results
(United States) U.S. International Classic	(United States) Ashley Cain / Timothy LeDuc	(United States) Audrey Lu / Misha Mitrofanov	(Australia) Ekaterina Alexandrovskaya / Harley Windsor	Results
(Canada) Autumn Classic International	(France) Vanessa James / Morgan Ciprès	(Canada) Kirsten Moore-Towers / Michael Marinaro	(United States) Haven Denney / Brandon Frazier	Results
(Germany) Nebelhorn Trophy	(Russia) Alisa Efimova / Alexander Korovin	(United States) Alexa Scimeca Knierim / Chris Knierim	(United States) Deanna Stellato / Nathan Bartholomay	Results
(Finland) Finlandia Trophy	(Russia) Evgenia Tarasova / Vladimir Morozov	(Canada) Kirsten Moore-Towers / Michael Marinaro	(Russia) Aleksandra Boikova / Dmitrii Kozlovskii	Results
(Estonia) Tallinn Trophy	(Austria) Miriam Ziegler / Severin Kiefer	(United States) Tarah Kayne / Danny O'Shea	(United States) Jessica Calalang / Brian Johnson	Results
(Croatia) Golden Spin of Zagreb	(Russia) Alisa Efimova / Alexander Korovin	(United States) Alexa Scimeca Knierim / Chris Knierim	(United States) Deanna Stellato-Dudek / Nathan Bartholomay	Results

Other international competitions
Competition	Gold	Silver	Bronze	Results
(Thailand) Asian Open Trophy	(China) Peng Cheng / Jin Yang	(North Korea) Ryom Tae-ok / Kim Ju-sik	No other competitors	Results
(Slovakia) Ondrej Nepela Trophy	(United States) Ashley Cain / Timothy LeDuc	(United States) Deanna Stellato / Nathan Bartholomay	(Russia) Lina Kudryavtseva / Ilia Spiridonov	Results
(Belarus) Ice Star	(Austria) Miriam Ziegler / Severin Kiefer	(Spain) Laura Barquero / Aritz Maestu	(Russia) Daria Pavliuchenko / Denis Khodykin	Results
(Latvia) Volvo Open Cup	(France) Cléo Hamon / Denys Strekalin	(France) Camille Mendoza / Pavel Kovalev	(France) Coline Keriven / Antoine Noel Pierre	Results
(Austria) Alpen Trophy	(Russia) Anastasia Mishina / Aleksandr Galliamov	(Italy) Rebecca Ghilardi / Filippo Ambrosini	No other competitors	Results
(Germany) Bavarian Open	(Spain) Laura Barquero / Aritz Maestu	(Germany) Annika Hocke / Ruben Blommaert	(United Kingdom) Zoe Jones / Christopher Boyadji	Results
(Israel) Open Ice Mall Cup	(Croatia) Lana Petranović / Antonio Souza-Kordeiru	(United Kingdom) Zoe Jones / Christopher Boyadji	(Israel) Anna Vernikov / Evgeni Krasnopolski	Results
(Netherlands) International Challenge Cup	(Germany) Minerva Fabienne Hase / Nolan Seegert	(Austria) Miriam Ziegler / Severin Kiefer	(Germany) Annika Hocke / Ruben Blommaert	Results
(Russia) Winter Universiade	(Russia) Alisa Efimova / Alexander Korovin	(Russia) Anastasia Poluianova / Dmitry Sopot	(Kazakhstan) Zhansaya Adykhanova / Abish Baytkanov	Results
(Italy) Egna Spring Trophy	(Italy) Irma Angela Sofia Caldara / Marco Santucci	No other competitors		Results

=== Ice dance ===
Championships
Competition	Gold	Silver	Bronze	Results
(Belarus) European Championships	(France) Gabriella Papadakis / Guillaume Cizeron	(Russia) Alexandra Stepanova / Ivan Bukin	(Italy) Charlène Guignard / Marco Fabbri	Results
(United States) Four Continents Championships	(United States) Madison Chock / Evan Bates	(Canada) Kaitlyn Weaver / Andrew Poje	(Canada) Piper Gilles / Paul Poirier	Results
(Croatia) World Junior Championships	(Canada) Marjorie Lajoie / Zachary Lagha	(Russia) Elizaveta Khudaiberdieva / Nikita Nazarov	(Russia) Sofia Shevchenko / Igor Eremenko	Results
(Japan) World Championships	(France) Gabriella Papadakis / Guillaume Cizeron	(Russia) Victoria Sinitsina / Nikita Katsalapov	(United States) Madison Hubbell / Zachary Donohue	Results

Grand Prix
Competition	Gold	Silver	Bronze	Results
(United States) Skate America	(United States) Madison Hubbell / Zachary Donohue	(Italy) Charlène Guignard / Marco Fabbri	(Russia) Tiffany Zahorski / Jonathan Guerreiro	Results
Skate Canada International	(United States) Madison Hubbell / Zachary Donohue	(Russia) Victoria Sinitsina / Nikita Katsalapov	(Canada) Piper Gilles / Paul Poirier	Results
(Finland) Grand Prix of Helsinki	(Russia) Alexandra Stepanova / Ivan Bukin	(Italy) Charlène Guignard / Marco Fabbri	(United States) Lorraine McNamara / Quinn Carpenter	Results
(Japan) NHK Trophy	(United States) Kaitlin Hawayek / Jean-Luc Baker	(Russia) Tiffany Zahorski / Jonathan Guerreiro	(United States) Rachel Parsons / Michael Parsons	Results
(Russia) Rostelecom Cup	(Russia) Alexandra Stepanova / Ivan Bukin	(Spain) Sara Hurtado / Kirill Khaliavin	(United States) Christina Carreira / Anthony Ponomarenko	Results
Internationaux de France	(France) Gabriella Papadakis / Guillaume Cizeron	(Russia) Victoria Sinitsina / Nikita Katsalapov	(Canada) Piper Gilles / Paul Poirier	Results
(Canada) Grand Prix Final	(United States) Madison Hubbell / Zachary Donohue	(Russia) Victoria Sinitsina / Nikita Katsalapov	(Italy) Charlène Guignard / Marco Fabbri	Results

Junior Grand Prix
Competition	Gold	Silver	Bronze	Results
JGP Slovakia	(Russia) Elizaveta Khudaiberdieva / Nikita Nazarov	(Russia) Elizaveta Shanaeva / Devid Naryzhnyy	(United States) Eliana Gropman / Ian Somerville	Results
JGP Austria	(Russia) Sofia Shevchenko / Igor Eremenko	(Canada) Marjorie Lajoie / Zachary Lagha	(Russia) Eva Kuts / Dmitrii Mikhailov	Results
JGP Lithuania	(Russia) Arina Ushakova / Maxim Nekrasov	(United States) Avonley Nguyen / Vadym Kolesnik	(Ukraine) Darya Popova / Volodymyr Byelikov	Results
JGP Canada	(Canada) Marjorie Lajoie / Zachary Lagha	(Russia) Polina Ivanenko / Daniil Karpov	(Russia) Ksenia Konkina / Alexander Vakhnov	Results
JGP Czech Republic	(Russia) Elizaveta Khudaiberdieva / Nikita Nazarov	(Georgia (country)) Maria Kazakova / Georgy Reviya	(Russia) Diana Davis / Gleb Smolkin	Results
JGP Slovenia	(United States) Avonley Nguyen / Vadym Kolesnik	(Russia) Sofia Shevchenko / Igor Eremenko	(Russia) Polina Ivanenko / Daniil Karpov	Results
JGP Armenia	(Russia) Arina Ushakova / Maxim Nekrasov	(Georgia (country)) Maria Kazakova / Georgy Reviya	(Canada) Ellie Fisher / Simon-Pierre Malette-Paquette	Results
(Canada) JGP Final	(Russia) Sofia Shevchenko / Igor Eremenko	(Russia) Arina Ushakova / Maxim Nekrasov	(Russia) Elizaveta Khudaiberdieva / Nikita Nazarov	Results

Challenger Series
Competition	Gold	Silver	Bronze	Results
(Thailand) Asian Open Trophy	(China) Wang Shiyue / Liu Xinyu	(United States) Rachel Parsons / Michael Parsons	(Japan) Misato Komatsubara / Tim Koleto	Results
(Italy) Lombardia Trophy	(Italy) Charlène Guignard / Marco Fabbri	(United States) Rachel Parsons / Michael Parsons	(Spain) Sara Hurtado / Kirill Khaliavin	Results
(United States) U.S. International Classic	(United States) Madison Hubbell / Zachary Donohue	(United States) Christina Carreira / Anthony Ponomarenko	(Japan) Misato Komatsubara / Tim Koleto	Results
(Slovakia) Ondrej Nepela Trophy	(Russia) Victoria Sinitsina / Nikita Katsalapov	(United States) Lorraine McNamara / Quinn Carpenter	(Russia) Betina Popova / Sergey Mozgov	Results
(Canada) Autumn Classic International	(Canada) Kaitlyn Weaver / Andrew Poje	(Spain) Olivia Smart / Adrián Díaz	(Canada) Carolane Soucisse / Shane Firus	Results
(Germany) Nebelhorn Trophy	(Canada) Piper Gilles / Paul Poirier	(United States) Rachel Parsons / Michael Parsons	(United States) Christina Carreira / Anthony Ponomarenko	Results
(Finland) Finlandia Trophy	(Russia) Alexandra Stepanova / Ivan Bukin	(Spain) Olivia Smart / Adrián Díaz	(France) Marie-Jade Lauriault / Romain Le Gac	Results
(Austria) Alpen Trophy	(Italy) Charlène Guignard / Marco Fabbri	(United States) Lorraine McNamara / Quinn Carpenter	(France) Marie-Jade Lauriault / Romain Le Gac	Results
(Estonia) Tallinn Trophy	(United States) Christina Carreira / Anthony Ponomarenko	(Russia) Anastasia Skoptsova / Kirill Aleshin	(Poland) Natalia Kaliszek / Maksym Spodyriev	Results
(Croatia) Golden Spin of Zagreb	(Canada) Piper Gilles / Paul Poirier	(Poland) Natalia Kaliszek / Maksym Spodyriev	(Russia) Betina Popova / Sergey Mozgov	Results

Other international competitions
Competition	Gold	Silver	Bronze	Results
(United States) Lake Placid Ice Dance International	(United States) Lorraine McNamara / Quinn Carpenter	(United States) Rachel Parsons / Michael Parsons	(Canada) Haley Sales / Nikolas Wamsteeker	Results
(Germany) NRW Trophy	(Germany) Katharina Müller / Tim Dieck	(Italy) Jasmine Tessari / Francesco Fioretti	(Germany) Shari Koch / Christian Nüchtern	Results
(Belarus) Ice Star	(Russia) Sofia Evdokimova / Egor Bazin	(Finland) Juulia Turkkila / Matthias Versluis	(Italy) Jasmine Tessari / Francesco Fioretti	Results
(Hungary) Halloween Cup	(Hungary) Anna Yanovskaya / Ádám Lukács	(Lithuania) Allison Reed / Saulius Ambrulevičius	(Germany) Shari Koch / Christian Nüchtern	Results
(Latvia) Volvo Open Cup	(Russia) Betina Popova / Sergey Mozgov	(Germany) Katharina Müller / Tim Dieck	(Ukraine) Darya Popova / Volodymyr Byelikov	Results
(Czech Republic) Pavel Roman Memorial	~~(Russia) Anastasia Shakun / Daniil Ragimov~~ (disqualified)	No other competitors		Results
(Poland) Warsaw Cup	(Russia) Tiffany Zahorski / Jonathan Guerreiro	(Poland) Natalia Kaliszek / Maksym Spodyriev	(Finland) Juulia Turkkila / Matthias Versluis	Results
(Turkey) Bosphorous Cup	(Russia) Sofia Evdokimova / Egor Bazin	(Germany) Shari Koch / Christian Nüchtern	(France) Adelina Galayavieva / Louis Thauron	Results
Open d'Andorra	(Italy) Jasmine Tessari / Francesco Fioretti	(Belarus) Anna Kublikova / Yuri Hulitski	(Italy) Chiara Calderone / Pietro Papetti	Results
(Hungary) Christmas Cup	(Hungary) Anna Yanovskaya / Ádám Lukács	(Hungary) Emily Monaghan / Ilias Fourati	(Hungary) Beatrice Tomczak / Dániel Illés	Results
(Poland) Mentor Cup	(United States) Madison Chock / Evan Bates	(Poland) Natalia Kaliszek / Maksym Spodyriev	(China) Wang Shiyue / Liu Xinyu	Results
(Italy) Egna Dance Trophy	(Italy) Jasmine Tessari / Francesco Fioretti	(Italy) Chiara Calderone / Pietro Papetti	(Russia) Alla Loboda / Anton Shibnev	Results
(Germany) Bavarian Open	(Russia) Anastasia Shpilevaya / Grigory Smirnov	(Germany) Jennifer Urban / Benjamin Steffan	(Finland) Juulia Turkkila / Matthias Versluis	Results
(Israel) Open Ice Mall Cup	(Ukraine) Oleksandra Nazarova / Maxim Nikitin	(Russia) Sofia Evdokimova / Egor Bazin	(Russia) Ksenia Konkina / Pavel Drozd	Results
(Russia) Winter Universiade	(Russia) Betina Popova / Sergey Mozgov	(Russia) Sofia Evdokimova / Egor Bazin	(France) Adelina Galyavieva / Louis Thauron	Results

== Season's best scores ==
=== Men's singles ===
Top 10 season's best scores in the men's combined total
No.	Skater	Nation	Score	Event
1	Nathan Chen	United States	323.42	2019 World Championships
2	Yuzuru Hanyu	Japan	300.97	2019 World Championships
3	Vincent Zhou	United States	299.01	2019 World Team Trophy
4	Shoma Uno	Japan	289.12	2019 Four Continents Championships
5	Mikhail Kolyada	Russia	274.37	2018 Ondrej Nepela Trophy
6	Jin Boyang	China	273.51	2019 Four Continents Championships
7	Javier Fernández	Spain	271.59	2019 European Championships
8	Alexander Samarin	Russia	269.84	2019 European Championships
9	Keegan Messing	Canada	267.61	2019 Four Continents Championships
10	Cha Jun-hwan	South Korea	263.49	2018–19 Grand Prix Final

Top 10 season's best scores in the men's short program
No.	Skater	Nation	Score	Event
1	Yuzuru Hanyu	Japan	110.53	2018 Rostelecom Cup
2	Nathan Chen	United States	107.40	2019 World Championships
3	Shoma Uno	Japan	104.15	2018 Lombardia Trophy
4	Vincent Zhou	United States	100.51	2019 World Team Trophy
5	Mikhail Kolyada	Russia	100.49	2019 European Championships
6	Cha Jun-hwan	South Korea	97.33	2019 Four Continents Championships
7	Jason Brown	United States	96.81	2019 World Championships
8	Keegan Messing	Canada	95.05	2018 Skate Canada International
9	Matteo Rizzo	Italy	93.37	2019 World Championships
10	Michal Březina	Czech Republic	93.31	2018 Grand Prix of Helsinki

Top 10 season's best scores in the men's free skating
No.	Skater	Nation	Score	Event
1	Nathan Chen	United States	216.02	2019 World Championships
2	Yuzuru Hanyu	Japan	206.10	2019 World Championships
3	Vincent Zhou	United States	198.50	2019 World Team Trophy
4	Shoma Uno	Japan	197.36	2019 Four Continents Championships
5	Jin Boyang	China	181.34	2019 Four Continents Championships
6	Javier Fernández	Spain	179.75	2019 European Championships
7	Keegan Messing	Canada	179.43	2019 Four Continents Championships
8	Mikhail Kolyada	Russia	178.21	2019 World Championships
9	Alexander Samarin	Russia	177.87	2019 European Championships
10	Cha Jun-hwan	South Korea	174.42	2018–19 Grand Prix Final

=== Ladies' singles ===
Top 10 season's best scores in the ladies' combined total
No.	Skater	Nation	Score	Event
1	Alina Zagitova	Russia	238.43	2018 Nebelhorn Trophy
2	Elizaveta Tuktamysheva	Russia	234.43	2019 World Team Trophy
3	Rika Kihira	Japan	233.12	2018–19 Grand Prix Final
4	Bradie Tennell	United States	225.64	2019 World Team Trophy
5	Elizabet Tursynbaeva	Kazakhstan	224.76	2019 World Championships
6	Evgenia Medvedeva	Russia	223.80	2019 World Championships
7	Kaori Sakamoto	Japan	223.65	2019 World Team Trophy
8	Alexandra Trusova	Russia	222.89	2019 World Junior Championships
9	Anna Shcherbakova	Russia	219.94	2019 World Junior Championships
10	Satoko Miyahara	Japan	219.71	2018 Skate America

Top 10 season's best scores in the ladies' short program
No.	Skater	Nation	Score	Event
1	Rika Kihira	Japan	83.97	2019 World Team Trophy
2	Alina Zagitova	Russia	82.08	2019 World Championships
3	Elizaveta Tuktamysheva	Russia	80.54	2019 World Team Trophy
4	Kaori Sakamoto	Japan	76.95	2019 World Team Trophy
5	Alena Kostornaia	Russia	76.32	2018–19 JGP Final
6	Satoko Miyahara	Japan	76.08	2018 NHK Trophy
7	Elizabet Tursynbaeva	Kazakhstan	75.96	2019 World Championships
8	Bradie Tennell	United States	74.81	2019 World Team Trophy
9	Alexandra Trusova	Russia	74.74	2018 JGP Lithuania
10	Evgenia Medvedeva	Russia	74.23	2019 World Championships

Top 10 season's best scores in the ladies' free skating
No.	Skater	Nation	Score	Event
1	Alina Zagitova	Russia	158.50	2018 Nebelhorn Trophy
2	Rika Kihira	Japan	154.72	2018 NHK Trophy
3	Elizaveta Tuktamysheva	Russia	153.89	2019 World Team Trophy
4	Bradie Tennell	United States	150.83	2019 World Team Trophy
5	Alexandra Trusova	Russia	150.40	2019 World Junior Championships
6	Evgenia Medvedeva	Russia	149.57	2019 World Championships
7	Elizabet Tursynbaeva	Kazakhstan	148.80	2019 World Championships
8	Anna Shcherbakova	Russia	147.08	2019 World Junior Championships
9	Kaori Sakamoto	Japan	146.70	2019 World Team Trophy
10	Satoko Miyahara	Japan	145.85	2018 Skate America

=== Pairs ===
Top 10 season's best scores in the pairs' combined total
No.	Team	Nation	Score	Event
1	Sui Wenjing / Han Cong	China	234.84	2019 World Championships
2	Evgenia Tarasova / Vladimir Morozov	Russia	228.47	2019 World Championships
3	Vanessa James / Morgan Ciprès	France	226.00	2019 World Team Trophy
4	Natalia Zabiiako / Alexander Enbert	Russia	217.98	2019 World Championships
5	Peng Cheng / Jin Yang	China	216.90	2018–19 Grand Prix Final
6	Kirsten Moore-Towers / Michael Marinaro	Canada	211.05	2019 Four Continents Championships
7	Aleksandra Boikova / Dmitrii Kozlovskii	Russia	210.30	2019 World Championships
8	Nicole Della Monica / Matteo Guarise	Italy	205.14	2019 European Championships
9	Ashley Cain / Timothy LeDuc	United States	196.82	2019 Four Continents Championships
10	Anastasia Mishina / Aleksandr Galliamov	Russia	192.75	2018 Alpen Trophy

Top 10 season's best scores in the pairs' short program
No.	Team	Nation	Score	Event
1	Evgenia Tarasova / Vladimir Morozov	Russia	81.21	2019 World Championships
2	Sui Wenjing / Han Cong	China	79.24	2019 World Championships
3	Vanessa James / Morgan Ciprès	France	76.55	2019 European Championships
4	Natalia Zabiiako / Alexander Enbert	Russia	75.80	2019 World Team Trophy
5	Peng Cheng / Jin Yang	China	75.69	2018–19 Grand Prix Final
6	Kirsten Moore-Towers / Michael Marinaro	Canada	74.66	2019 Four Continents Championships
7	Nicole Della Monica / Matteo Guarise	Italy	73.70	2019 European Championships
8	Aleksandra Boikova / Dmitrii Kozlovskii	Russia	72.58	2019 European Championships
9	Daria Pavliuchenko / Denis Khodykin	Russia	69.38	2018 Rostelecom Cup
10	Polina Kostiukovich / Dmitrii Ialin	Russia	68.31	2019 World Junior Championships

Top 10 season's best scores in the pairs' free skating
No.	Team	Nation	Score	Event
1	Sui Wenjing / Han Cong	China	155.60	2019 World Championships
2	Vanessa James / Morgan Ciprès	France	152.52	2019 World Team Trophy
3	Evgenia Tarasova / Vladimir Morozov	Russia	147.26	2019 World Championships
4	Natalia Zabiiako / Alexander Enbert	Russia	144.02	2019 World Championships
5	Peng Cheng / Jin Yang	China	141.21	2018–19 Grand Prix Final
6	Aleksandra Boikova / Dmitrii Kozlovskii	Russia	140.31	2019 World Championships
7	Kirsten Moore-Towers / Michael Marinaro	Canada	136.39	2019 Four Continents Championships
8	Nicole Della Monica / Matteo Guarise	Italy	131.51	2018 Rostelecom Cup
9	Ashley Cain / Timothy LeDuc	United States	129.33	2019 Four Continents Championships
10	Anastasia Mishina / Aleksandr Galliamov	Russia	128.37	2018 Alpen Trophy

=== Ice dance ===
Top 10 season's best scores in the combined total (ice dance)
No.	Team	Nation	Score	Event
1	Gabriella Papadakis / Guillaume Cizeron	France	223.13	2019 World Team Trophy
2	Victoria Sinitsina / Nikita Katsalapov	Russia	215.20	2019 World Team Trophy
3	Madison Hubbell / Zachary Donohue	United States	210.40	2019 World Championships
4	Alexandra Stepanova / Ivan Bukin	Russia	208.52	2019 World Championships
5	Madison Chock / Evan Bates	United States	207.42	2019 Four Continents Championships
6	Kaitlyn Weaver / Andrew Poje	Canada	205.62	2019 World Championships
7	Charlène Guignard / Marco Fabbri	Italy	202.54	2019 World Team Trophy
8	Piper Gilles / Paul Poirier	Canada	202.45	2019 Four Continents Championships
9	Kaitlin Hawayek / Jean-Luc Baker	United States	189.87	2019 Four Continents Championships
10	Laurence Fournier Beaudry / Nikolaj Sørensen	Canada	188.10	2019 World Championships

Top 10 season's best scores in the rhythm dance
No.	Team	Nation	Score	Event
1	Gabriella Papadakis / Guillaume Cizeron	France	88.42	2019 World Championships
2	Victoria Sinitsina / Nikita Katsalapov	Russia	84.57	2019 World Team Trophy
3	Alexandra Stepanova / Ivan Bukin	Russia	83.10	2019 World Championships
4	Madison Hubbell / Zachary Donohue	United States	83.09	2019 World Championships
5	Kaitlyn Weaver / Andrew Poje	Canada	82.84	2019 World Championships
6	Madison Chock / Evan Bates	United States	82.32	2019 World Championships
7	Charlène Guignard / Marco Fabbri	Italy	81.66	2019 World Championships
8	Piper Gilles / Paul Poirier	Canada	80.44	2019 World Championships
9	Kaitlin Hawayek / Jean-Luc Baker	United States	75.90	2019 World Championships
10	Tiffany Zahorski / Jonathan Guerreiro	Russia	75.49	2018 NHK Trophy

Top 10 season's best scores in the free dance
No.	Team	Nation	Score	Event
1	Gabriella Papadakis / Guillaume Cizeron	France	135.82	2019 World Team Trophy
2	Victoria Sinitsina / Nikita Katsalapov	Russia	130.63	2019 World Team Trophy
3	Madison Hubbell / Zachary Donohue	United States	127.31	2019 World Championships
4	Madison Chock / Evan Bates	United States	126.25	2019 Four Continents Championships
5	Alexandra Stepanova / Ivan Bukin	Russia	125.42	2019 World Championships
6	Piper Gilles / Paul Poirier	Canada	124.40	2019 Four Continents Championships
7	Kaitlyn Weaver / Andrew Poje	Canada	124.18	2019 World Team Trophy
8	Charlène Guignard / Marco Fabbri	Italy	122.29	2019 World Team Trophy
9	Kaitlin Hawayek / Jean-Luc Baker	United States	115.45	2019 Four Continents Championships
10	Laurence Fournier Beaudry / Nikolaj Sørensen	Canada	113.61	2019 Four Continents Championships

== World standings ==
=== Men's singles ===
As of April 9, 2019.

No.	Skater	Nation
1	Nathan Chen	United States
2	Shoma Uno	Japan
3	Yuzuru Hanyu	Japan
4	Mikhail Kolyada	Russia
5	Jason Brown	United States
6	Vincent Zhou	United States
7	Javier Fernández	Spain
8	Keegan Messing	Canada
9	Alexander Samarin	Russia
10	Jin Boyang	China

=== Ladies' singles ===
As of April 9, 2019.

No.	Skater	Nation
1	Alina Zagitova	Russia
2	Satoko Miyahara	Japan
3	Evgenia Medvedeva	Russia
4	Kaetlyn Osmond	Canada
5	Kaori Sakamoto	Japan
6	Mai Mihara	Japan
7	Wakaba Higuchi	Japan
8	Elizabet Tursynbaeva	Kazakhstan
9	Maria Sotskova	Russia
10	Bradie Tennell	United States

=== Pairs ===
As of April 9, 2019.

No.	Team	Nation
1	Evgenia Tarasova / Vladimir Morozov	Russia
2	Natalia Zabiiako / Alexander Enbert	Russia
3	Vanessa James / Morgan Ciprès	France
4	Aljona Savchenko / Bruno Massot	Germany
5	Nicole Della Monica / Matteo Guarise	Italy
6	Kirsten Moore-Towers / Michael Marinaro	Canada
7	Sui Wenjing / Han Cong	China
8	Peng Cheng / Jin Yang	China
9	Aleksandra Boikova / Dmitrii Kozlovskii	Russia
10	Yu Xiaoyu / Zhang Hao	China

=== Ice dance ===
As of April 9, 2019.

No.	Skater	Nation
1	Madison Hubbell / Zachary Donohue	United States
2	Gabriella Papadakis / Guillaume Cizeron	France
3	Tessa Virtue / Scott Moir	Canada
4	Alexandra Stepanova / Ivan Bukin	Russia
5	Charlène Guignard / Marco Fabbri	Italy
6	Ekaterina Bobrova / Dmitri Soloviev	Russia
7	Madison Chock / Evan Bates	United States
8	Kaitlin Hawayek / Jean-Luc Baker	United States
9	Piper Gilles / Paul Poirier	Canada
10	Victoria Sinitsina / Nikita Katsalapov	Russia
