= 2019 World Figure Skating Championships =

Annual figure skating competition held in 2019

- Type: ISU Championship
- Date: March 18 – 24
- Season: 2018–19
- Location: Saitama, Japan
- Host: Japan Skating Federation
- Venue: Saitama Super Arena

Champions
- Men's singles: (United States) Nathan Chen
- Women's singles: (Russia) Alina Zagitova
- Pairs: (China) Sui Wenjing and Han Cong
- Ice dance: (France) Gabriella Papadakis and Guillaume Cizeron
- Previous: 2018 World Championships
- Next: 2021 World Championships

The 2019 World Figure Skating Championships were held from March 18–24, 2019, at the Saitama Super Arena in Saitama, Japan. Sanctioned by the International Skating Union (ISU), the World Championships are considered the most prestigious event in figure skating. Medals were awarded in men's singles, women's singles, pair skating, and ice dance. Nathan Chen of the United States won the men's event, Alina Zagitova of Russia won the women's event, Sui Wenjing and Han Cong of China won the pairs event, and Gabriella Papadakis and Guillaume Cizeron of France won the ice dance event. The competition would have determined the entry quotas for each skating federation at the 2020 World Championships; however, the 2020 World Champions were eventually cancelled due to the COVID-19 pandemic.

== Background ==
The World Figure Skating Championships are considered the most prestigious event in figure skating. The 2019 World Figure Skating Championships were held from March 18–24, 2019, at the Saitama Super Arena in Saitama, Japan.

== Qualification ==
The number of entries from each nation for the 2019 World Championships was based on the results of the 2018 World Championships. These nations were eligible to enter more than one skater or team in the indicated disciplines.

Number of entries per discipline
Spots	Men	Women	Pairs	Ice dance
3	Japan; United States; Russia	Japan; Canada; Russia	Russia	United States; Canada; Italy
2	Israel; Canada; Czech Republic; Latvia; Uzbekistan	Italy; Belgium; United States	Germany; France; Italy; Canada; China	France; Russia

== Changes to preliminary assignments ==
The International Skating Union published the initial list of entrants on February 25, 2019.

Date	Discipline	Withdrew	Added	Reason/Other notes	Refs
February 26	Pairs	(Japan) Miu Suzaki / Ryuichi Kihara	N/A	Concussion (Kihara)	
February 27	Ladies	(Russia) Stanislava Konstantinova	(Russia) Evgenia Medvedeva	Further consideration	
March 5	Ladies	(Finland) Viveca Lindfors	(Finland) Emmi Peltonen	Medical	
March 6	Ladies	(Sweden) Matilda Algotsson	(Sweden) Anita Östlund	Further consideration	
March 13	Men	(Russia) Maxim Kovtun	(Russia) Andrei Lazukin	Medical	

== Records ==
The following new record high scores were set during this event.

Record high scores
Date	Skater	Disc.	Segment	Score	Ref.
March 20	(China); Sui Wenjing; Han Cong	Pairs	Short program	79.24	
March 20	(Russia); Evgenia Tarasova; Vladimir Morozov	Pairs	Short program	81.21	
March 21	(China); Sui Wenjing; Han Cong	Pairs	Free skating	155.60	
March 21	(Russia); Evgenia Tarasova; Vladimir Morozov	Pairs	Total score	228.47	
March 21	(China); Sui Wenjing; Han Cong	Pairs	Total score	234.84	
March 22	(France); Gabriella Papadakis; Guillaume Cizeron	Ice dance	Rhythm dance	88.42	
March 23	(France); Gabriella Papadakis; Guillaume Cizeron	Ice dance	Free dance	134.23	
March 23	(France); Gabriella Papadakis; Guillaume Cizeron	Ice dance	Total score	222.65	
March 23	(Japan); Yuzuru Hanyu	Men	Free skating	206.10	
March 23	(Japan); Yuzuru Hanyu	Men	Total score	300.97	
March 23	(United States); Nathan Chen	Men	Free skating	216.02	
March 23	(United States); Nathan Chen	Men	Total score	323.42	

== Results ==
=== Men's singles ===
Defending World Champion Nathan Chen finished first after the short program, with his American teammate Jason Brown finishing in second place. Chen was satisfied with his performance, saying, "There are always things I can do better, things I can improve on but ultimately everything I did, I did as best as I could and I hope to continue that into the free program". Brown's short program, despite not having any quad jumps in comparison to his competitors, has been praised as one of the best short programs of the season. After moving to Toronto in the off-season, Brown reflected on his newfound maturity, noting, "There's a bit of confidence, a maturity confidence. As far as the skating goes, there's still a lot of changes that we have to make, but as the season's gone on, I've gotten a lot more confidence. I think it's a sense of maturity, the way that I'm carrying myself." Two-time Olympic and World Champion Yuzuru Hanyu, rounded out the top 3 despite doubling his quad salchow attempt. While commenting about his performance at the press conference Hanyu expressed his surprise of being awarded third place, despite missing the second half of the season due to an injured ankle, "I'm disappointed with my short program, I made a big mistake and I've got to reform and improve for the free skate, but I'm honored to be in the top three." Four Continents Bronze Medallist Vincent Zhou finished in fourth, European bronze medallist Matteo Rizzo was fifth, while Four Continents champion, Olympic silver medallist and two-time defending silver medallist Shoma Uno completed the top six.

Chen maintained the lead he gained in the short program, becoming the first American male skater to defend a World Title since Scott Hamilton in 1984. He finished 22 points ahead of Hanyu, who became the first skater to break the 200-point mark since the introduction of the +5 GOE system, marking the fifth consecutive year of a Japanese skater winning the silver medal. Hanyu was called for an under-rotation and uneasy landing on his quad salchow, missed half of the season due to a lingering ankle injury and was proud of his performance despite not having enough strength in his ankle. Zhou's bronze medal was his first major ISU Championship senior medal, making himself and Chen the first two American men to make the world championship podium since 1996. After breaking the free skate world record at Four Continents, Uno's fourth-place finish was a shock to the home crowd—with a fall on his quad flip, an under-rotation on a combination jump and incomplete landing call on his opening quad salchow—was notably in tears when speaking to Japanese media stating feelings of regret and disappointment. When reflecting on his season, Uno was upset at his performance "If I recall, there are more competitions that I got disappointed over joyful ones in this season, [...] Overall, I am still disappointed in myself. I need to become much stronger mentally." Jin Boyang finished in fifth with two triple Axels and a big cheer from the crowd, with his performance component score bringing down his marks. Despite a second-place finish in the short program, Brown could not maintain his lead and dropped to ninth overall after a messy free skate, including a fall on his quad salchow, although was positive about his incredible improvement throughout the season. Kevin Aymoz suffered an injury to his hands after cutting them when trying to save a jump gone wrong, resulting in blood dripping on the ice.

Rank	Name	Nation	Total points	SP		FS	
1	Nathan Chen	United States	323.42	1	107.40	1	216.02
2	Yuzuru Hanyu	Japan	300.97	3	94.87	2	206.10
3	Vincent Zhou	United States	281.16	4	94.17	3	186.99
4	Shoma Uno	Japan	270.32	6	91.40	4	178.92
5	Jin Boyang	China	262.71	9	84.26	5	178.45
6	Mikhail Kolyada	Russia	262.44	10	84.23	6	178.21
7	Matteo Rizzo	Italy	257.66	5	93.37	10	164.29
8	Michal Březina	Czech Republic	254.28	8	86.96	8	167.32
9	Jason Brown	United States	254.15	2	96.81	14	157.34
10	Andrei Lazukin	Russia	248.74	11	84.05	9	164.69
11	Kévin Aymoz	France	247.47	7	88.24	12	159.23
12	Alexander Samarin	Russia	246.33	20	78.38	7	167.95
13	Morisi Kvitelashvili	Georgia	240.74	12	82.67	13	158.07
14	Keiji Tanaka	Japan	238.40	19	78.76	11	159.64
15	Keegan Messing	Canada	237.64	14	82.38	15	155.26
16	Nam Nguyen	Canada	237.27	13	82.51	16	154.76
17	Vladimir Litvintsev	Azerbaijan	230.84	16	81.46	19	149.38
18	Alexander Majorov	Sweden	229.72	17	79.17	17	150.55
19	Cha Jun-hwan	South Korea	229.26	18	79.17	18	150.09
20	Brendan Kerry	Australia	222.02	21	78.26	21	143.76
21	Deniss Vasiļjevs	Latvia	218.52	23	74.74	20	143.78
22	Alexei Bychenko	Israel	216.60	22	77.67	22	138.93
23	Julian Zhi Jie Yee	Malaysia	205.97	24	73.63	23	132.34
24	Daniel Samohin	Israel	205.28	15	82.00	24	123.28
25	Peter James Hallam	Great Britain	66.06	25	66.06	—N/a	
26	Luc Maierhofer	Austria	65.78	26	65.78	—N/a	
27	Aleksandr Selevko	Estonia	63.25	27	63.25	—N/a	
28	Paul Fentz	Germany	63.24	28	63.24	—N/a	
29	Ivan Shmuratko	Ukraine	62.99	29	62.99	—N/a	
30	Burak Demirboğa	Turkey	60.79	30	60.79	—N/a	
31	Slavik Hayrapetyan	Armenia	60.66	31	60.66	—N/a	
32	Valtter Virtanen	Finland	55.73	32	55.73	—N/a	
33	Donovan Carrillo	Mexico	54.99	33	54.99	—N/a	
34	Lukas Britschgi	Switzerland	54.58	34	54.58	—N/a	
35	Ihor Reznichenko	Poland	50.15	35	50.15	—N/a	

=== Women's singles ===
2018 Olympic gold medallist Alina Zagitova took the lead in the short program, ahead of home crowd favourite and Japanese national champion Kaori Sakamoto who achieved a personal best score after performing a near perfect triple flip-triple toe-loop combination. Zagitova mentioned that she was nervous before beginning her program as she had experienced several mistakes and errors throughout the season, although stated that she felt more mentally prepared in comparison to the rest of her season. Sakamoto was pleased with her performance, "I was able to execute everything as I did in practice and will aim to do that again in the free skate." Zagitova's training partner Elizabet Tursynbaeva surprised both critics and the crowd to finish in third. After a rocky season, two-time world champion Evgenia Medvedeva finished fourth by achieving a seasons best for a short program that was first performed in December, receiving a standing ovation from the Japanese crowd despite an under-rotation call on her triple toe-loop. Short program world record holder and Grand Prix Final champion, Rika Kihira finished in seventh after singling her triple Axel attempt. 2017 World bronze medallist and 2018 Olympic Team Champion Gabrielle Daleman made her return to international competition after taking personal leave for mental health reasons, finishing in 11th despite skating clean.

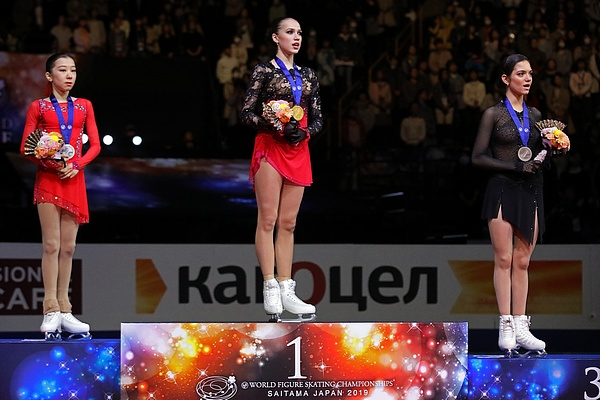
Ladies' podium (left to right) – Tursynbaeva (silver), Zagitova (gold) and Medvedeva (bronze)

Zagitova took first in the free skate to win her first world title, becoming the first female skater since Yuna Kim to complete a Career Grand Slam after silver medal finishes at the Grand Prix Final and Europeans. When speaking to the media Zagitova stated "I realized that I needed a clean skate and I went into each jump determined to land it". Tursynbaeva became the first senior woman to land a quad jump, completing a clean quad salchow in the free skate to take silver for Kazakhstan, their first in any discipline since Denis Ten in 2015. Tursynbaeva couldn't believe she landed her quad after falling in her previous two attempts in competition. Medvedeva narrowly beat Kihira for the bronze by a tenth of a mark, despite Kihira beating Medvedeva in the free skate the deficit from the short program it was not enough to change the standings. Kihira's Japanese teammates, short program silver medallist Sakamoto and Satoko Miyahara finished fifth and sixth, respectively, with Sakamoto popping her planned triple-flip which cost her a place on the podium. The judging panel came under scrutiny with Medvedeva not being called for her lutz performed with the wrong edge, with critics and fans criticising a lack of consistency amongst the judging of other skaters, marring the final result.

Rank	Name	Nation	Total points	SP		FS	
1	Alina Zagitova	Russia	237.50	1	82.08	1	155.42
2	Elizabet Tursynbaeva	Kazakhstan	224.76	3	75.96	4	148.80
3	Evgenia Medvedeva	Russia	223.80	4	74.23	3	149.57
4	Rika Kihira	Japan	223.49	7	70.90	2	152.59
5	Kaori Sakamoto	Japan	222.83	2	76.86	5	145.97
6	Satoko Miyahara	Japan	215.95	8	70.60	6	145.35
7	Bradie Tennell	United States	213.47	10	69.50	7	143.97
8	Sofia Samodurova	Russia	208.58	9	70.42	8	138.16
9	Mariah Bell	United States	208.07	6	71.26	9	136.81
10	Lim Eun-soo	South Korea	205.57	5	72.91	10	132.66
11	Gabrielle Daleman	Canada	192.67	11	69.19	12	123.48
12	Loena Hendrickx	Belgium	186.29	13	62.60	11	123.69
13	Ekaterina Ryabova	Azerbaijan	179.88	17	57.18	13	122.70
14	Yi Christy Leung	Hong Kong	177.22	14	58.60	14	118.62
15	Laurine Lecavelier	France	170.59	19	56.81	15	113.78
16	Nicole Schott	Germany	170.56	12	63.18	17	107.38
17	Alexandra Feigin	Bulgaria	165.31	20	56.69	16	108.62
18	Daša Grm	Slovenia	161.16	16	57.58	18	103.58
19	Chen Hongyi	China	157.59	15	58.53	19	99.06
20	Eliška Březinová	Czech Republic	153.45	18	57.13	20	96.32
21	Natasha McKay	Great Britain	151.56	21	56.40	21	95.16
22	Eva Lotta Kiibus	Estonia	149.99	23	55.38	22	94.61
23	Alaine Chartrand	Canada	148.97	22	55.89	23	93.08
24	Isadora Williams	Brazil	143.22	24	55.20	24	88.02
25	Ivett Tóth	Hungary	54.87	25	54.87	—N/a	
26	Pernille Sørensen	Denmark	54.36	26	54.36	—N/a	
27	Marina Piredda	Italy	53.27	27	53.27	—N/a	
28	Emmi Peltonen	Finland	53.22	28	53.22	—N/a	
29	Julia Sauter	Romania	53.11	29	53.11	—N/a	
30	Anita Östlund	Sweden	53.07	30	53.07	—N/a	
31	Roberta Rodeghiero	Italy	51.50	31	51.50	—N/a	
32	Nicole Rajičová	Slovakia	51.22	32	51.22	—N/a	
33	Alexia Paganini	Switzerland	50.51	33	50.51	—N/a	
34	Valentina Matos	Spain	50.25	34	50.25	—N/a	
35	Aurora Cotop	Canada	48.83	35	48.83	—N/a	
36	Kailani Craine	Australia	48.82	36	48.82	—N/a	
37	Sophia Schaller	Austria	48.72	37	48.72	—N/a	
38	Elžbieta Kropa	Lithuania	47.95	38	47.95	—N/a	
39	Anastasia Galustyan	Armenia	47.75	39	47.75	—N/a	
40	Kyarha van Tiel	Netherlands	41.85	40	41.85	—N/a	

=== Pairs ===
Evgenia Tarasova & Vladimir Morozov finished the short program by breaking the world record, competing with their 2018 Olympic short program. In their second competition of the season, 2017 World Champions Sui Wenjing & Han Cong finished in second place, with their training partners and compatriots Peng Cheng & Jin Yang finishing in third. Event favourites Vanessa James & Morgan Cipres struggled with the short program once again, after James accidentally collided with Matteo Guarise in the warm-up that left both athletes shaken. Guarise was left with bruises on his left hip and pain in his left knee, "I wanted to slow down when I saw Vanessa, I am a big guy and she is so tiny. I didn't want to hurt her." James, who was left uninjured, when discussing the incident with Olympic Channel she noted, "we've had some hard situations but we always push through them."

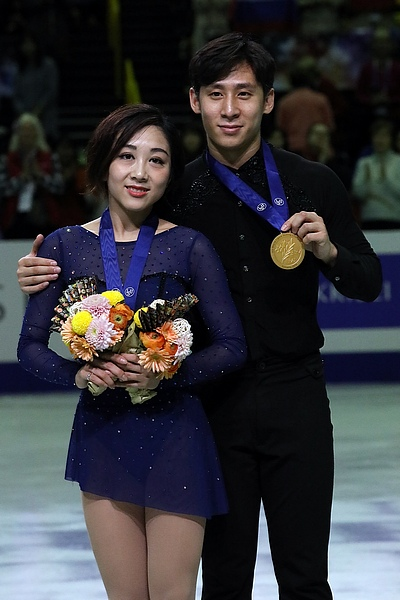
World Champions, Sui Wenjing and Han Cong (China), with their gold medals after the pairs event podium presentation

Sui and Han broke the free skate world record to win their second world title in three years, with the skates by the top four considered to be one of the best in recent world championships, with Sui and Han's considered one of the best pairs free skates of all time. Sui discussed the difficulties and challenges they had throughout the season while recovering from ankle surgery, Sui noted to the media "In the short, we performed very well, and as the last to go on today, we knew that if we did well and challenged ourselves, we would win." Although Morozov stumbled his side-by-side jump, he and his partner Tarasova finished in second place, with their compatriots Natalia Zabiiako and Alexander Enbert taking a surprising bronze medal after finishing in fourth in the short program. Despite finishing third in the free skate and fifth overall, James and Cipres were frustrated with their performances, with Cipres adding although they were proud of their performance, "we want this title, everybody knows that we can do it, we know that we can do it, and we are going to do it."

Rank	Team	Nation	Total points	SP		FS	
1	Sui Wenjing / Han Cong	China	234.84	2	79.24	1	155.60
2	Evgenia Tarasova / Vladimir Morozov	Russia	228.47	1	81.21	2	147.26
3	Natalia Zabiiako / Alexander Enbert	Russia	217.98	4	73.96	4	144.02
4	Peng Cheng / Jin Yang	China	215.84	3	75.51	5	140.33
5	Vanessa James / Morgan Ciprès	France	215.19	7	68.67	3	146.52
6	Aleksandra Boikova / Dmitrii Kozlovskii	Russia	210.30	6	69.99	6	140.31
7	Kirsten Moore-Towers / Michael Marinaro	Canada	200.02	5	73.08	8	126.94
8	Nicole Della Monica / Matteo Guarise	Italy	195.74	8	67.29	7	128.45
9	Ashley Cain / Timothy LeDuc	United States	193.81	9	66.93	9	126.88
10	Miriam Ziegler / Severin Kiefer	Austria	178.66	11	63.65	11	115.01
11	Ryom Tae-ok / Kim Ju-sik	North Korea	175.31	13	58.77	10	116.54
12	Evelyn Walsh / Trennt Michaud	Canada	174.40	12	59.84	12	114.56
13	Minerva Fabienne Hase / Nolan Seegert	Germany	174.04	10	64.28	14	109.76
14	Annika Hocke / Ruben Blommaert	Germany	166.36	16	53.16	13	113.20
15	Laura Barquero / Aritz Maestu	Spain	162.27	14	55.58	15	106.69
16	Lana Petranović / Antonio Souza-Kordeiru	Croatia	153.99	15	53.70	17	100.29
17	Zoe Jones / Christopher Boyadji	Great Britain	153.70	17	52.45	16	101.25
18	Hanna Abrazhevich / Martin Bidař	Czech Republic	140.02	19	48.66	18	91.36
19	Rebecca Ghilardi / Filippo Ambrosini	Italy	133.75	18	52.02	19	81.73

=== Ice dance ===
Defending world champions Gabriella Papadakis & Guillaume Cizeron completed the Rhythm Dance with a five-point lead over the Russian team of Victoria Sinitsina & Nikita Katsalapov. Papadakis stated that an improvement of their technique training helped them gain the points advantage they wanted going into the free skate, calling their skate "the best performance". Olympic Ice Dance Champion Meryl Davis, praised Papadakis and Cizeron for their performance, calling it "very special, [...] remarkable" and "in a class of their own". Alexandra Stepanova & Ivan Bukin finished in third, leading by 0.01 over Americans and defending silver medallists Madison Hubbell & Zachary Donohue. Hubbell was positive about their performance as they had improved their technical score, which was their main goal for their performance. The reigning bronze medallists, Kaitlyn Weaver & Andrew Poje finished in fifth, with Weaver calling their performance "a magical experience [...] but not perfect". Laurence Fournier Beaudry & Nikolaj Sorensen made their first appearance for Canada after competing for Denmark in previous championships, with Sorensen suffering a wardrobe malfunction that placed them in tenth.

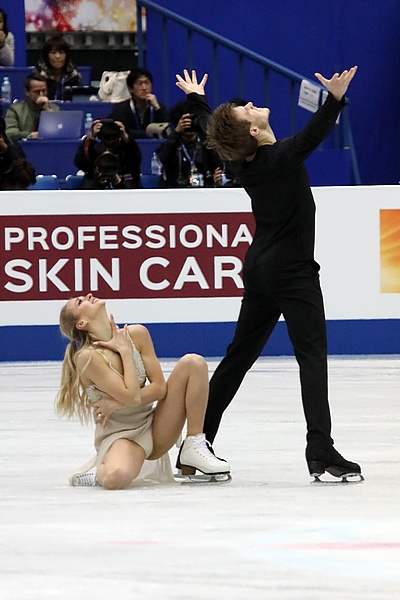
Victoria Sinitsina and Nikita Katsalapov at the conclusion of their silver medal-winning free skate

Papadakis and Cizeron maintained their lead from the Rhythm Dance winning their fourth World Title in five years by finishing eleven points higher overall than silver medallists Sinitsina and Katsalapov, with the French team's only loss being to Tessa Virtue & Scott Moir in 2017. Cizeron was happy with their performance, while Papadakis reflected at the last time the world championships were in Saitama, "we were exactly here five years ago for the worlds in Saitama and it's funny to remember the whole experience we came in this five years, where we were at the time and where we are now". Katsalapov achieved his first major ISU Championship medal since his bronze medal at the Sochi Olympics with previous partner Elena Ilinykh, while it was current partner Sinitsina first overall. Sinitsina and Katsalapov were also the first Russian Ice Dance team to finish on the worlds podium since Ekaterina Bobrova & Dmitri Soloviev in 2013. Hubbell and Donohue took the bronze ahead of Stepanova and Bukin, making it the fifth consecutive year of an American Ice Dance team finishing on the podium. Hubbell explained how their partnership had improved throughout the year and the risk to change their program choreography weeks before the world championship, "to be able to skate an emotionally strong performance as well as a technically strong performance, it's what every athlete wants." Despite receiving a standing ovation from the crowd, Stepanova and Bukin's technical content was not enough to push them into the top three, missing by two points. Weaver and Poje completed the top five, despite missing the first half of the season, performing a tribute program to late skater Denis Ten.

Rank	Name	Nation	Total points	RD		FD	
1	Gabriella Papadakis / Guillaume Cizeron	France	222.65	1	88.42	1	134.23
2	Victoria Sinitsina / Nikita Katsalapov	Russia	211.76	2	83.94	2	127.82
3	Madison Hubbell / Zachary Donohue	United States	210.40	4	83.09	3	127.31
4	Alexandra Stepanova / Ivan Bukin	Russia	208.52	3	83.10	4	125.42
5	Kaitlyn Weaver / Andrew Poje	Canada	205.62	5	82.84	5	122.78
6	Madison Chock / Evan Bates	United States	204.92	6	82.32	6	122.60
7	Piper Gilles / Paul Poirier	Canada	200.92	8	80.44	7	120.48
8	Charlène Guignard / Marco Fabbri	Italy	199.18	7	81.66	8	117.52
9	Kaitlin Hawayek / Jean-Luc Baker	United States	189.06	9	75.90	10	113.16
10	Laurence Fournier Beaudry / Nikolaj Sørensen	Canada	188.10	10	74.76	9	113.34
11	Natalia Kaliszek / Maksym Spodyriev	Poland	183.30	11	73.64	12	109.66
12	Sara Hurtado / Kirill Khaliavin	Spain	180.93	12	72.45	13	108.48
13	Lilah Fear / Lewis Gibson	Great Britain	179.57	15	68.46	11	111.11
14	Marie-Jade Lauriault / Romain Le Gac	France	179.26	13	71.26	14	108.00
15	Wang Shiyue / Liu Xinyu	China	173.89	14	68.47	15	105.42
16	Juulia Turkkila / Matthias Versluis	Finland	168.12	18	66.01	16	102.11
17	Allison Reed / Saulius Ambrulevičius	Lithuania	168.06	16	67.21	17	100.85
18	Shari Koch / Christian Nüchtern	Germany	162.47	17	66.91	18	95.56
19	Anna Yanovskaya / Ádám Lukács	Hungary	156.81	20	61.96	19	94.85
20	Oleksandra Nazarova / Maxim Nikitin	Ukraine	153.43	19	65.76	20	87.67
21	Misato Komatsubara / Tim Koleto	Japan	60.98	21	60.98	—N/a	
22	Anna Kublikova / Yuri Hulitski	Belarus	56.55	22	56.55	—N/a	
23	Victoria Manni / Carlo Rothlisberger	Switzerland	53.94	23	53.94	—N/a	
24	Jasmine Tessari / Francesco Fioretti	Italy	53.47	24	53.47	—N/a	
25	Shira Ichilov / Vadim Davidovich	Israel	52.51	25	52.51	—N/a	
26	Chantelle Kerry / Andrew Dodds	Australia	51.94	26	51.94	—N/a	
27	Katerina Bunina / German Frolov	Estonia	46.22	27	46.22	—N/a	

== Medals summary ==
=== Medalists ===
Medals awarded to the skaters who achieve the highest overall placements in each discipline:

Discipline	Gold	Silver	Bronze
Men	(United States) Nathan Chen	(Japan) Yuzuru Hanyu	(United States) Vincent Zhou
Ladies	(Russia) Alina Zagitova	(Kazakhstan) Elizabet Tursynbaeva	(Russia) Evgenia Medvedeva
Pairs	(China) Sui Wenjing / Han Cong	(Russia) Evgenia Tarasova / Vladimir Morozov	(Russia) Natalia Zabiiako / Alexander Enbert
Ice dancing	(France) Gabriella Papadakis / Guillaume Cizeron	(Russia) Victoria Sinitsina / Nikita Katsalapov	(United States) Madison Hubbell / Zachary Donohue

Small medals awarded to the skaters who achieve the highest short program or rhythm dance placements in each discipline:

Discipline	Gold	Silver	Bronze
Men	(United States) Nathan Chen	(United States) Jason Brown	(Japan) Yuzuru Hanyu
Ladies	(Russia) Alina Zagitova	(Japan) Kaori Sakamoto	(Kazakhstan) Elizabet Tursynbaeva
Pairs	(Russia) Evgenia Tarasova / Vladimir Morozov	(China) Sui Wenjing / Han Cong	(China) Peng Cheng / Jin Yang
Ice dancing	(France) Gabriella Papadakis / Guillaume Cizeron	(Russia) Victoria Sinitsina / Nikita Katsalapov	(Russia) Alexandra Stepanova / Ivan Bukin

Medals awarded to the skaters who achieve the highest free skating or free dance placements in each discipline:

Discipline	Gold	Silver	Bronze
Men	(United States) Nathan Chen	(Japan) Yuzuru Hanyu	(United States) Vincent Zhou
Ladies	(Russia) Alina Zagitova	(Japan) Rika Kihira	(Russia) Evgenia Medvedeva
Pairs	(China) Sui Wenjing / Han Cong	(Russia) Evgenia Tarasova / Vladimir Morozov	(France) Vanessa James / Morgan Ciprès
Ice dancing	(France) Gabriella Papadakis / Guillaume Cizeron	(Russia) Victoria Sinitsina / Nikita Katsalapov	(United States) Madison Hubbell / Zachary Donohue

=== Medals by country ===
Table of medals for overall placement:

Rank	Nation	Gold	Silver	Bronze	Total
1	Russia (RUS)	1	2	2	5
2	United States (USA)	1	0	2	3
3	China (CHN)	1	0	0	1
3	France (FRA)	1	0	0	1
5	Japan (JPN)	0	1	0	1
5	Kazakhstan (KAZ)	0	1	0	1
Totals (6 entries)		4	4	4	12

== Controversy ==
=== Mariah Bell/Lim Eun-soo collision ===
During a practice session run-through of American skater Mariah Bell's short program, Bell skated past Korean skater Lim Eun-soo, who was along the baseboards. As Bell approached, her toe-pick scraped the back of Lim's left calf, causing a minor injury. Bell had right-of-way on the ice at the time due to it being her program run-through. Lim's management agency, All That Skate, claimed that the incident was a deliberate attack by Bell on her training teammate in Rafael Arutyunyan's coaching group, while Bell said it was an accident. Because Bell's music was playing during practice, she had the right-of-way at the time and Lim should have been aware of where Bell was on the ice. ISU released a statement clearing Bell of wrongdoing in the incident. U.S. Figure Skating extended an apology to the Korean Skating Union over the incident.
