= Martin Bidař =

Czech pair skater (born 1999)

- Bidař at the 2026 World Championships

Personal information
- Born: 24 February 1999 (age 27) České Budějovice, Czech Republic
- Height: 1.82 m (6 ft 0 in)

Figure skating career
- Country: Czech Republic
- Discipline: Pair skating (since 2013); Men's singles (2014–16)
- Partner: Anna Valesi (since 2025); Barbora Kucianová (2023–25); Jelizaveta Žuková (2019–23); Hanna Abrazhevich (2018–19); Anna Dušková (2013–2018)
- Coach: Ondřej Hotárek
- Skating club: BK České Budějovice
- Began skating: 2003
- Highest WS: 14th (2016–17)

Medal record
Czech Championships
| Gold medal – first place | 2020 Ostrava | Pairs |
| Gold medal – first place | 2021 Cieszyn | Pairs |
| Gold medal – first place | 2024 Turnov | Pairs |
| Gold medal – first place | 2026 Presov | Pairs |
Winter Youth Olympics
| Silver medal – second place | 2016 Lillehammer | Pairs |
| Silver medal – second place | 2016 Lillehammer | Team |
World Junior Championships
| Gold medal – first place | 2016 Debrecen | Pairs |
Junior Grand Prix Final
| Silver medal – second place | 2015–16 Barcelona | Pairs |
| Silver medal – second place | 2016–17 Marseille | Pairs |

Martin Bidař (born 24 February 1999) is a Czech pair skater. With his current partner Anna Valesi, he is the 2026 Czech national champion.

With former partner Anna Dušková, they are the 2016 World Junior champions, 2016 Youth Olympic silver medalists (both individually and in the team event), and 2015 Junior Grand Prix Final silver medalists. Dušková and Bidař represented the Czech Republic at the 2018 Winter Olympics.

With former partner, Jelizaveta Žuková they are two-time Czech national champions (2020–2021) and represented the Czech Republic at the 2022 Winter Olympics.

With former partner Barbora Kucianová, they are the 2024 Czech Championship gold medalists.

== Personal life ==
Martin Bidař was born on 24 February 1999 in České Budějovice, Czech Republic. He is the son of a figure skating coach Iveta Bidařová and the younger brother of former pair skater, Petr Bidař. His sisters are also former figure skaters.

== Skating career ==
=== Early years ===
Martin Bidař started learning to skate in 2003. Originally single skaters, he and Anna Dušková began skating together as a pair after their coach, Eva Horklová, suggested the idea. Recalling their beginnings, Dušková stated, "It was quite embarrassing at first because everybody was skating singles, and we had to hold hands. We were so young and shy." In the 2011–2012 season, they competed on the novice national level.

=== Partnership with Dušková ===
==== 2013–14 season: Junior international debut ====
Dušková/Bidař's ISU Junior Grand Prix (JGP) debut came in the 2013–2014 season; they finished eighth in September 2013 in Košice, Slovakia, and sixth the next month in Ostrava, Czech Republic. In March 2014, the pair placed tenth at the World Junior Championships in Sofia, Bulgaria, having ranked tenth in both segments.

==== 2014–15 season ====
In 2014–2015, Dušková/Bidař continued on the JGP series, finishing tenth in Estonia and eighth in Germany. They came in eighth at the 2015 World Junior Championships in Tallinn, Estonia, after placing ninth in both segments.

==== 2015–16 season: World Junior champions, Winter Youth Olympic silver medalists ====
Although based mainly in the Czech Republic, Dušková/Bidař also spent some time training in Montreal and Sochi in the summer of 2015 and made another visit to Montreal during the competitive season.

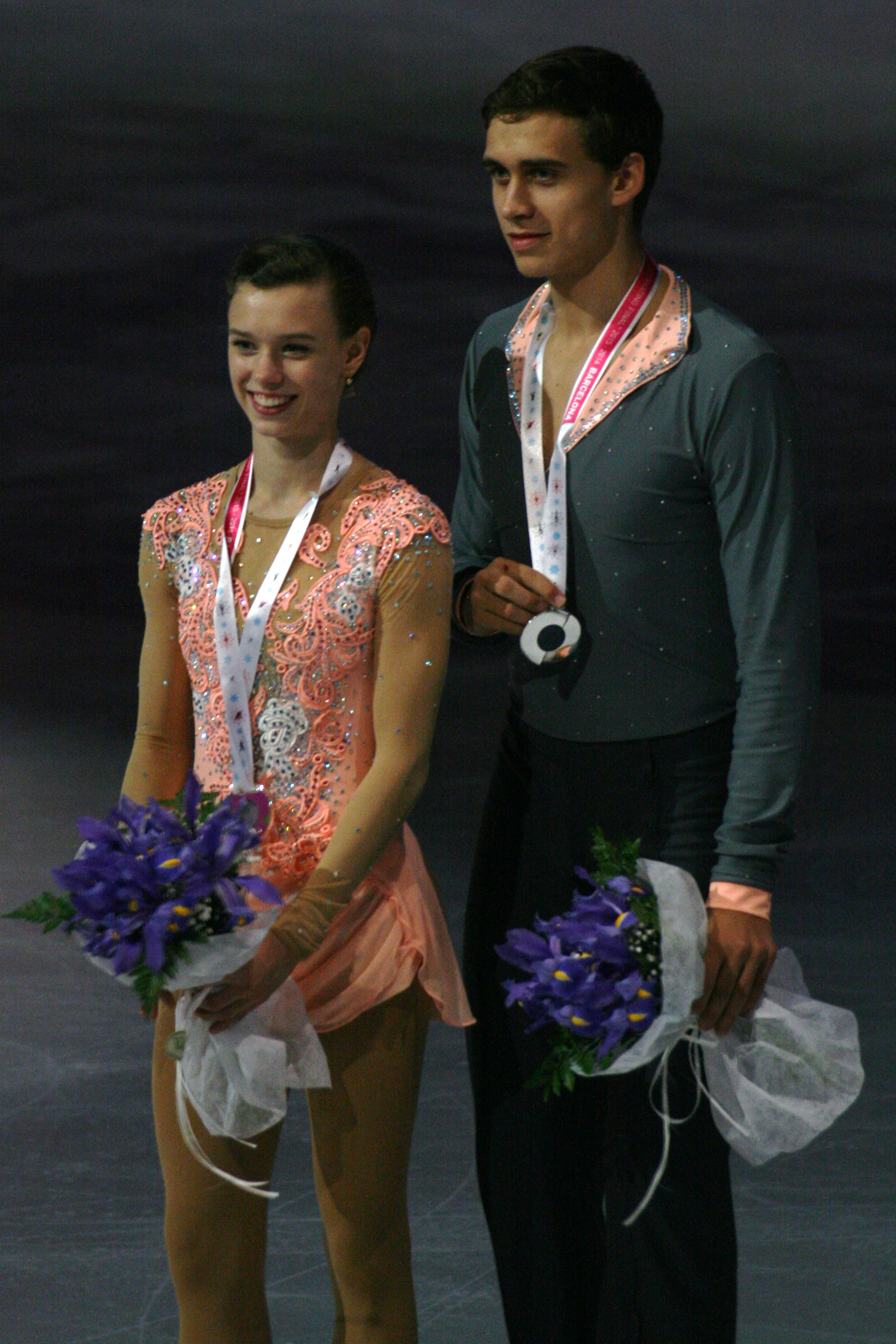
Anna Dušková and Martin Bidař at the 2015–16 Junior Grand Prix Final

Competing in the 2015 JGP series, Dušková/Bidař won a silver medal in August in Linz, Austria, and finished fourth the following month in Riga, Latvia. The results qualified them for the 2015 JGP Final, held in December 2015 in Barcelona, Spain. Ranked third in the short program and second in the free skate, Dušková/Bidař edged out Russia's Atakhanova/Spiridonov by 0.33 for the silver medal behind Borisova/Sopot, who won gold by a margin of 9.53 points. They became the first Czech pair to step on the podium at a JGP Final.

In February 2016, Dušková/Bidař competed in Hamar, Norway, at the Winter Youth Olympics, placing first in the short program, second in the free skate, and second overall with a total score 2.53 less than Borisova/Sopot. Their silver is the Czech Republic's first Youth Olympic medal in figure skating. In March, Dušková/Bidař won gold at the 2016 World Junior Championships in Debrecen, Hungary. Ranked first in both segments, they outscored two Russian pairs – silver medalists Mishina/Mirzoev by 9.22 points and bronze medalists Borisova/Sopot by 12.82 points – to become the Czech Republic's first World Junior champions in figure skating. They are also the first pairs skaters from outside China, Russia, or the United States to win the competition since 2001. On their future plans, Dušková stated that "there will be less and less singles competitions for me. We will concentrate on pairs."

==== 2016–17 season: Senior debut ====
Ahead of the season, Dušková/Bidař spent three weeks training in Montreal before returning to the Czech Republic. Opening their season on the JGP series, the pair won gold at their September event in Ostrava, ahead of Atakhanova/Spiridonov, and then silver the following month in Dresden, behind Mishina/Mirzoev. Later in October, making their senior international debut, they outscored Austrians Ziegler/Kiefer to win the International Cup of Nice. In December, they placed second to Mishina/Mirzoev at the JGP Final in Marseille.

Dušková/Bidař placed seventh at the 2017 European Championships in Ostrava and fourteenth at the 2017 World Championships in Helsinki.

==== 2017–18 season: Pyeongchang Olympics, end of Duškova/Bidař ====
In September 2017, Dušková/Bidař competed at the Nebelhorn Trophy, the final qualifying opportunity for the 2018 Winter Olympics. The pair placed ninth and earned a spot for the Czech Republic in the pairs event at the Olympics.

Dušková injured a knee ligament during a warm-up before training in late October and decided to undergo an operation later. As a result, the pair withdrew from their two Grand Prix assignments – the 2017 Cup of China and 2017 Internationaux de France.

Dušková/Bidař returned to competition at the 2018 Winter Olympics in Pyeongchang, South Korea. They qualified for the free skate by placing fifteenth in the short program and went on to finish fourteenth overall. Ranked thirteenth in the short and eleventh in the free, the pair finished eleventh at the 2018 World Championships in Milan, Italy. On 27 April 2018, they announced that they had parted ways.

=== Partnership with Abrazhevich ===
==== 2018–19 season ====
On 25 September 2018, it was announced that Martin Bidař partnered with Hanna Abrazhevich of Belarus. They finished eighteenth at the 2019 World Championships. They ended their partnership following the season.

=== Partnership with Zhuk ===
==== 2019–20 season: Debut of Zhuk/Bidař ====
On 26 June 2019, Bidař announced a new partnership with Russian pair skater Elizaveta Zhuk. They competed exclusively domestically in their first season together, winning the Czech national title.

==== 2020–21 season ====
With the COVID-19 pandemic limiting international opportunities, Zhuk/Bidař made their debut internationally at the 2020 CS Nebelhorn Trophy, one of only four pairs on the preliminary entry list. They were fifth in the short, fourth in the free, and fourth overall. They subsequently competed at the 2021 World Championships, placing fifteenth and, in the process, qualifying for a berth for a Czech pair at the 2022 Winter Olympics.

==== 2021–22 season: Beijing Olympics ====
In September, the Czech federation officially named Zhuk/Bidař to the Czech Olympic team. They made their debut at the 2021 CS Finlandia Trophy, where they placed ninth. They later competed at a second Challenger event, finishing twelfth at the 2021 CS Warsaw Cup.

Zhuk opted to restyle her name as Jelizaveta Žuková in advance of the Olympics. Žuková/Bidař made their European Championships debut in Tallinn, finishing in twelfth place.

Žuková/Bidař began the 2022 Winter Olympics as the Czech entries in the pairs' short program Olympic team event, where they placed eighth of nine, earning three points for the Czech team. Team Czech Republic did not advance to the next stage of the competition and finished eighth overall. With two falls in the short program of the pairs event, they finished seventeenth and were the first team to miss qualification for the free skate. Žuková sustained an ankle injury in training, as a result of which they did not compete at the 2022 World Championships.

==== 2022–23 season ====
Žuková/Bidař were eighth at the 2022 CS Nebelhorn Trophy to start the season before placing sixth at the 2022 Skate Canada International.

In December 2022, it was announced that the pair had parted ways.

=== Partnership with Kucianová ===
==== 2023–24 season: Debut of Kucianová/Bidař ====
In May 2023, it was announced by the Czech Figure Skating Association that Bidař had teamed up with Barbora Kucianová and that they would be coached by Petr Bidař in Prague and by Ondřej Hotárek in Bergamo.

They started the season by competing on the 2023–24 ISU Challenger Series, finishing ninth at the 2023 CS Lombardia Trophy and at the 2023 CS Finlandia Trophy. They would then go on to place fourth at the 2023 Tayside Trophy.

In January, Kucianová/Bidař competed at the 2024 Four National Championships, where they took the bronze medal. Selected to compete at the 2024 European Championships in Kaunas, Lithuania, the pair would finish thirteenth at the event.

They would then finish their season by winning bronze at the 2024 Bavarian Open and placing seventh at the 2024 International Challenge Cup.

==== 2024–25 season: End of Kucianová/Bidař ====
Kucianová/Bidař began the season by finishing eighth at the 2024 CS Lombardia Trophy and ninth at the 2024 CS Warsaw Cup.

In January, it was announced that the pair had parted ways and that Bidař had teamed up with Italian-born pair skater, Anna Valesi.

=== Partnership with Valesi ===
==== 2024–25 season: Debut of Valesi/Bidař ====
Valesi/Bidař made their debut as a pair at the 2025 Merano Ice Trophy in mid-February, where they won the silver medal.

==== 2025–26 season ====
Valesi/Bidař opened their season by winning bronze at the 2025 Lombardia Trophy. They then went on to finish seventh at the ISU Skate to Milano, winning silver at the 2025 Tayside Trophy, and winning gold at the 2025 Cup of Innsbruck.

In December, Valesi/Bidař finished fifth at the 2025 CS Golden Spin of Zagreb and winning silver at the 2026 Four National Championships. The following month, they competed at the 2026 European Championships in Sheffield, England, United Kingdom. The pair placed twelfth in the short program and seventh in the free skate, moving up to ninth place overall. "I don’t know what to say right now and how I’m feeling," shared Valesi following their free skate. "I am feeling super emotional. Like me and Martin, we know how much work we put into it, how much we believed in it, and always tried to have a good feeling between each other. So today was like amazing overall. The public, the feeling between us, the coaches, the support from everybody, we feel very, very good." Bidař added, "For me, it’s a really important part is that even in a hard time, we really stay together. We are very happy that it paid off today and we really enjoyed it from the morning on the whole day."

== Programs ==
=== Pair skating with Anna Valesi ===
| Season | Short program | Free skating |
|---|---|---|
| 2025–26 | Suite bergamasque, L. 75: III. Clair de lune by Claude Debussy performed by Philippe Entremont | Notre-Dame de Paris by Luc Plamondon, Riccardo Cocciante, Jannick Top, & Serge Perathoner; Le temps des cathédrales performed by Bruno Pelletier; Danse mon Esmeralda performed by Garou |
| 2024–25 | Suite bergamasque, L. 75: III. Clair de lune by Claude Debussy performed by Philippe Entremont | Notre-Dame de Paris by Luc Plamondon, Riccardo Cocciante, Jannick Top, & Serge Perathoner; Le temps des cathédrales performed by Bruno Pelletier; Danse mon Esmeralda performed by Garou |

=== Pair skating with Barbora Kucianová ===
| Season | Short program | Free skating |
|---|---|---|
| 2024–25 | Burning by Yeah Yeah Yeahs choreo. by Julie Marcotte | Wicked Game by Chris Isaak performed by Lusaint, Annaca, & Ursine Vulpine choreo. by Petr Bidař, Barbora Prokopová |
| 2023–24 | Burning by Yeah Yeah Yeahs choreo. by Julie Marcotte | Wicked Game by Chris Isaak performed by Lusaint, Annaca, & Ursine Vulpine choreo. by Petr Bidař, Barbora Prokopová |

=== Pair skating with Jelizaveta Žuková ===
| Season | Short program | Free skating |
|---|---|---|
| 2022–23 | Keeping Me Alive by Jonathan Roy choreo. by Benoit Richaud | So Far by Ólafur Arnalds & Arnor Dan choreo. by Benoit Richaud |
| 2021–22 | Boom Boom by 2WEI choreo. by Benoit Richaud | So Far by Ólafur Arnalds & Arnor Dan choreo. by Benoit Richaud |
| 2020–21 | Prologue (from West Side Story) by Leonard Bernstein choreo. by Dmitri Savin | Ave Maria by Franz Schubert arranged by Rob Tyger, Kay Denar performed by Sarah Connor choreo. by Dmitri Savin |

=== Pair skating with Hanna Abrazhevich ===
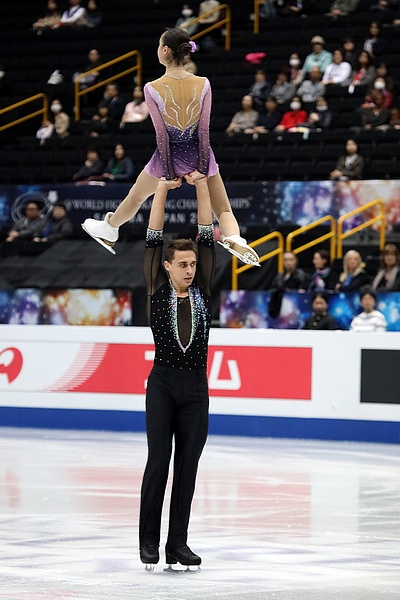
Abrazhevich/Bidař at the 2019 World Championships

| Season | Short program | Free skating |
|---|---|---|
| 2018–19 | Le Di a la Caza Alcance by Michael Nyman performed by Estrella Morente choreo. by Petr Bidař | The Hollywood Wiz (from Cirque du Soleil) by Andreas Carlsson, Brian Bacon choreo. by Dmitri Savin |

=== Pair skating with Anna Dušková ===
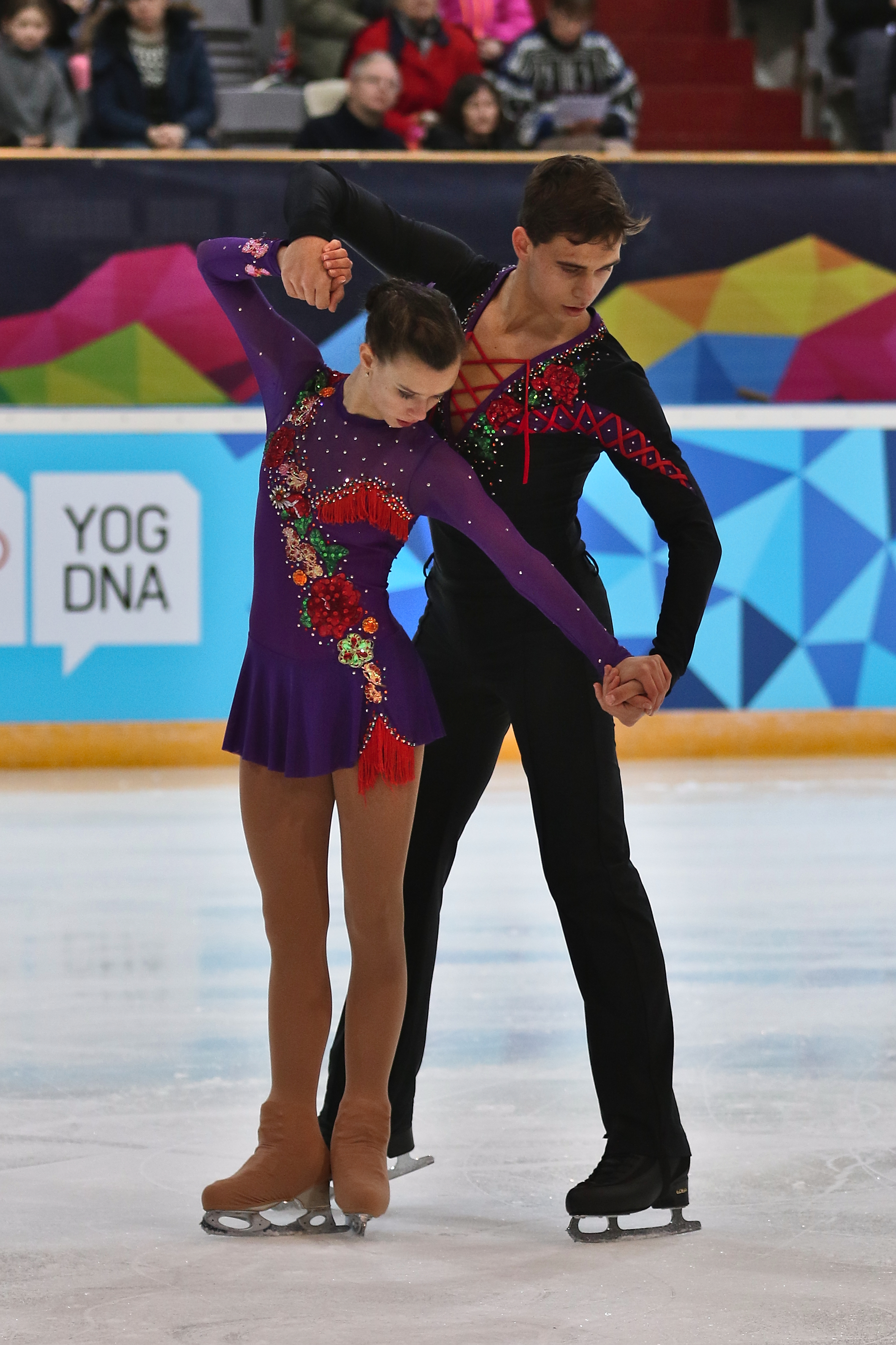
Dušková/Bidař at the 2016 Winter Youth Olympics

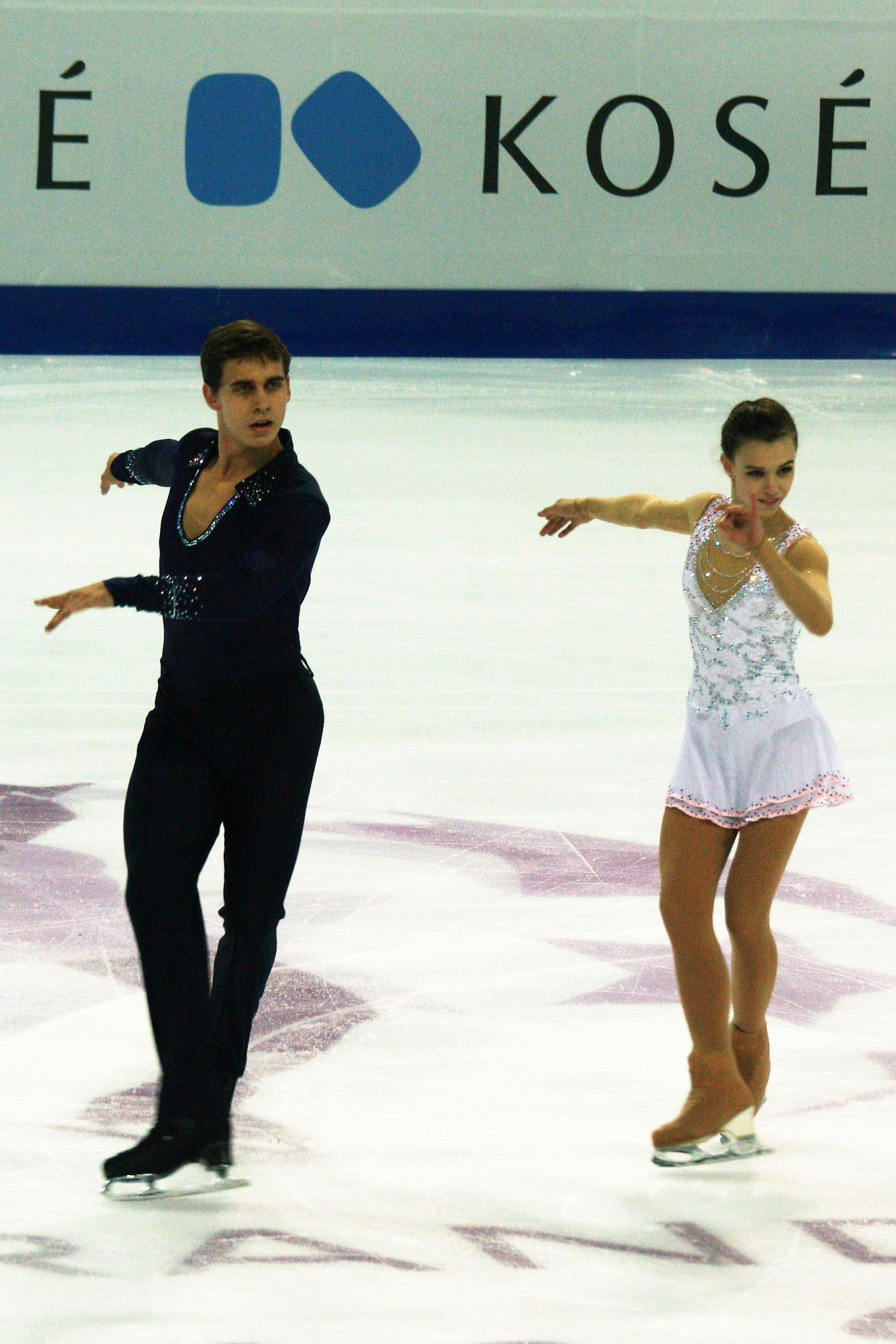
Dušková/Bidař at the 2016–17 Junior Grand Prix Final

| Season | Short program | Free skating | Exhibition |
|---|---|---|---|
| 2017–18 | LA 40 (Album: Tango Hereje) performed by The Mozart Tango Players choreo. by Maurizio Margaglio | Cirque du Soleil medley; Once Upon a Time (from La Nouba); La Nouba (from La Nouba); Pearl (from Koozå); Klezmer Moment (from Corteo) choreo. by Rostislav Sinicyn | |
| 2016–17 | LA 40 (Album: Tango Hereje) performed by The Mozart Tango Players choreo. by Maurizio Margaglio | La leyenda del beso by Raúl Di Blasio; Historia de un Amor by Pérez Prado; La leyenda del beso by Raúl Di Blasio | Mamboleo by Mambo Mania |
| 2015–16 | Cirque du Soleil by René Dupéré | La leyenda del beso by Raúl Di Blasio; Historia de un Amor by Pérez Prado; La leyenda del beso by Raúl Di Blasio | Mamboleo by Mambo Mania |
| 2014–15 | Cirque du Soleil by René Dupéré | Burlesque: Jungle Berlin by Joseph L. Altruda; Show Me How You Burlesque; Bound to You | |
| 2013–14 | Italian Street Song by Victor Herbert; Waltz; Italian Street Song by Victor Herbert | Burlesque: Jungle Berlin by Joseph L. Altruda; Show Me How You Burlesque; Bound to You | |
| 2012–13 | Italian Street Song by Victor Herbert; Waltz; Italian Street Song by Victor Herbert | Amélie (soundtrack); Le Banquet by Yann Tiersen | |
| 2011–12 | | Amélie (soundtrack); Le Banquet by Yann Tiersen | |

== Competitive highlights ==
- GP – Event of the ISU Grand Prix Series
- JGP – Event of the ISU Junior Grand Prix Series
- CS – Event of the ISU Challenger Series
- WD – Withdrew from competition

=== Pair skating with Anna Valesi ===
Competition placements at senior level
| Season | 2024–25 | 2025–26 | 2026–27 |
|---|---|---|---|
| World Championships | | 15th | |
| European Championships | | 9th | |
| Czech Championships | | 1st | |
| Four Nationals Championships | | 2nd | |
| GP NHK Trophy | | | TBD |
| GP Skate Canada International | | | 4th |
| CS Golden Spin of Zagreb | | 5th | |
| CS Nebelhorn Trophy | | | 8th |
| Cup of Innsbruck | | 1st | |
| Lombardia Trophy | | 3rd | |
| Merano Ice Trophy | 2nd | | |
| Skate to Milano | | 7th | |
| Tayside Trophy | | 2nd | 3rd |

=== Pair skating with Barbora Kucianová ===
Competition placements at senior level
| Season | 2023–24 | 2024–25 |
|---|---|---|
| European Championships | 13th | |
| Czech Championships | 1st | |
| Four Nationals Championships | 3rd | |
| CS Finlandia Trophy | 9th | |
| CS Lombardia Trophy | 9th | 8th |
| CS Warsaw Cup | | 9th |
| Bavarian Open | 3rd | |
| Challenge Cup | 7th | |
| Diamond Spin | WD | |
| Tayside Trophy | 4th | |

=== Pair skating with Jelizaveta Žuková ===
Competition placements at senior level
| Season | 2019–20 | 2020–21 | 2021–22 | 2022–23 |
|---|---|---|---|---|
| Winter Olympics | | | 17th | |
| Winter Olympics (Team event) | | | 8th | |
| World Championships | | 15th | | |
| European Championships | | | 12th | |
| Czech Championships | 1st | 1st | | |
| Four Nationals Championships | (Note: As Jelizaveta Žuková had not yet been released from Russia to compete internationally, she and Martin Bidař competed in the Czech Championships, but not the Four Nationals Championships.) | 1st | | |
| GP Skate Canada | | | | 6th |
| CS Finlandia Trophy | | | 9th | |
| CS Nebelhorn Trophy | | 4th | | 8th |
| CS Warsaw Cup | | | 12th | |
| Autumn Talents Cup | | | 1st | |
| Challenge Cup | | 4th | | |

=== Pair skating with Hanna Abrazhevich ===
Competition placements at senior level
| Season | 2018–19 |
|---|---|
| World Championships | 18th |
| Bavarian Open | 5th |
| Open Ice Mall Cup | 4th |

=== Pair skating with Anna Dušková ===
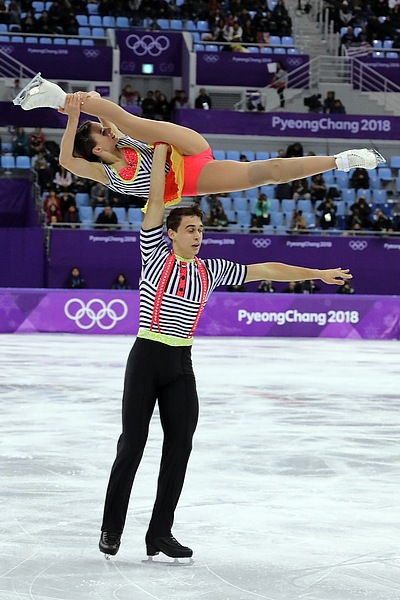
Dušková and Bidař at the 2018 Winter Olympics

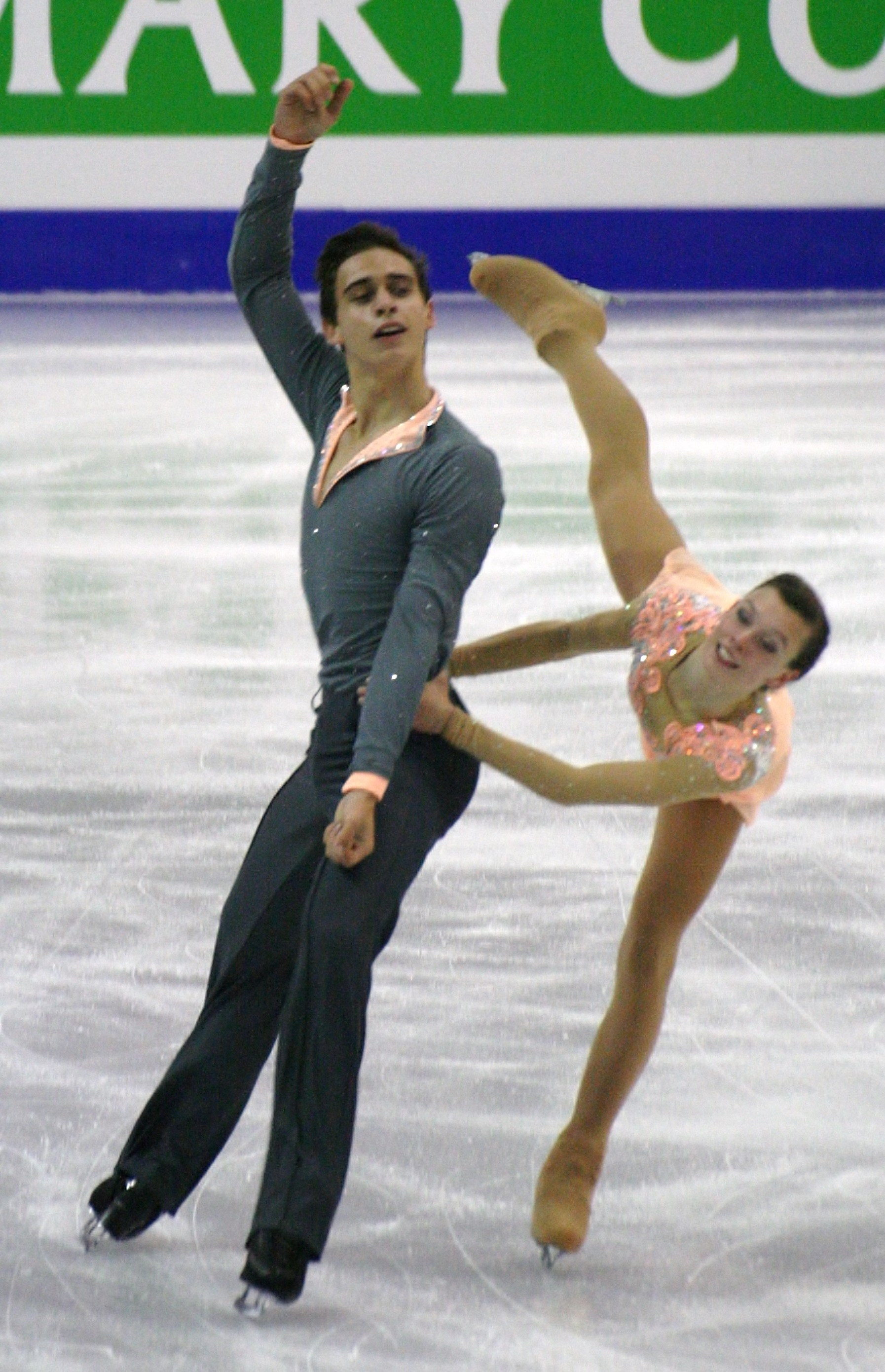
Dušková and Bidař at the 2015–16 Junior Grand Prix Final

Competition placements at senior level
| Season | 2016–17 | 2017–18 |
|---|---|---|
| Winter Olympics | | 14th |
| World Championships | 14th | 11th |
| European Championships | 7th | |
| CS Nebelhorn Trophy | | 9th |
| Cup of Nice | 1st | |

Competition placements at junior level
| Season | 2013–14 | 2014–15 | 2015–16 | 2016–17 |
|---|---|---|---|---|
| Winter Youth Olympics | | | 2nd | |
| Winter Youth Olympics (Team event) | | | 2nd | |
| World Junior Championships | 10th | 8th | 1st | |
| Junior Grand Prix Final | | | 2nd | 2nd |
| Czech Championships | 1st | 1st | | |
| Four Nationals Championships | 1st | 1st | | |
| JGP Austria | | | 2nd | |
| JGP Czech Republic | 6th | | | 1st |
| JGP Estonia | | 10th | | |
| JGP Germany | | 8th | | 2nd |
| JGP Latvia | | | 4th | |
| JGP Slovakia | 8th | | | |
| Ice Challenge | 1st | 1st | | |
| NRW Trophy | | 1st | 2nd | |

=== Single skating ===
Competition placements at senior level
| Season | 2015–16 |
|---|---|
| Czech Championships | 4th |
| Four Nationals Championships | 6th |

== Detailed results ==
ISU personal best scores in the +5/-5 GOE System
| Segment | Type | Score | Event |
|---|---|---|---|
| Total | TSS | 170.46 | 2026 World Championships |
| Short program | TSS | 60.44 | 2026 Skate Canada International |
| Short program | TES | 32.95 | 2025 CS Golden Spin of Zagreb |
| Short program | PCS | 27.79 | 2026 CS Nebelhorn Trophy |
| Free skating | TSS | 113.88 | 2026 World Championships |
| Free skating | TES | 61.34 | 2026 World Championships |
| Free skating | PCS | 55.03 | 2026 Skate Canada International |

=== Pair skating with Anna Valesi ===
Results in the 2024–25 season
| Date | Event | SP | | FS | | Total | |
| Date | Event | P | Score | P | Score | P | Score |
|---|---|---|---|---|---|---|---|
| Feb 13–16, 2025 | (Italy) 2025 Merano Ice Trophy | 5 | 51.13 | 1 | 110.35 | 2 | 161.48 |

Results in the 2025–26 season
| Date | Event | SP | | FS | | Total | |
| Date | Event | P | Score | P | Score | P | Score |
|---|---|---|---|---|---|---|---|
| Sep 11–14, 2025 | (Italy) 2025 Lombardia Trophy | 3 | 58.10 | 3 | 112.47 | 3 | 170.57 |
| Sep 18–21, 2025 | (China) 2025 ISU Skate to Milano | 5 | 57.17 | 7 | 98.94 | 7 | 156.11 |
| Oct 11–12, 2025 | (United Kingdom) 2025 Tayside Trophy | 5 | 62.87 | 2 | 119.60 | 2 | 182.47 |
| Nov 13–16, 2025 | (Austria) 2025 Cup of Innsbruck | 1 | 64.10 | 1 | 106.99 | 1 | 171.09 |
| Dec 3–6, 2025 | (Croatia) 2025 CS Golden Spin of Zagreb | 7 | 58.42 | 5 | 110.10 | 5 | 168.52 |
| Dec 11–13, 2025 | (Slovakia) 2026 Four Nationals Championships | 3 | 62.30 | 2 | 113.48 | 2 | 175.78 |
| Dec 11–13, 2025 | (Czech Republic) 2026 Czech Championships (Note: The Czech Championships are contested as part of the Four Nationals Championships.) | 1 | —N/a | 1 | —N/a | 1 | —N/a |
| Jan 13–18, 2026 | (United Kingdom) 2026 European Championships | 12 | 53.80 | 7 | 113.62 | 9 | 167.42 |
| Mar 24–29, 2026 | (Czech Republic) 2026 World Championships | 20 | 56.58 | 13 | 113.88 | 15 | 170.46 |

Results in the 2026–27 season
| Date | Event | SP | | FS | | Total | |
| Date | Event | P | Score | P | Score | P | Score |
|---|---|---|---|---|---|---|---|
| Sep 24–26, 2026 | (Germany) 2026 CS Nebelhorn Trophy | 5 | 59.30 | 11 | 92.42 | 8 | 151.72 |
| Oct 10-11, 2026 | (United Kingdom) 2026 Tayside Trophy | 6 | 54.64 | 2 | 102.95 | 3 | 157.59 |
| Oct 30 - Nov 1, 2026 | 2026 Skate Canada International | 5 | 60.44 | 4 | 106.22 | 4 | 166.66 |

=== Pair skating with Barbora Kucianová ===
Results in the 2023–24 season
| Date | Event | SP | | FS | | Total | |
| Date | Event | P | Score | P | Score | P | Score |
|---|---|---|---|---|---|---|---|
| Sep 8–10, 2023 | (Italy) 2023 CS Lombardia Trophy | 10 | 50.79 | 8 | 91.89 | 9 | 142.65 |
| Oct 4–8, 2023 | (Finland) 2023 CS Finlandia Trophy | 8 | 48.93 | 9 | 83.97 | 9 | 132.90 |
| Oct 14–15, 2023 | (United Kingdom) 2023 Tayside Trophy | 2 | 54.63 | 4 | 90.77 | 4 | 145.40 |
| Oct 19–22, 2023 | (Poland) 2023 Diamond Spin | 3 | 51.79 | —N/a | —N/a | – | WD |
| Dec 14–16, 2023 | (Czech Republic) 2024 Four Nationals Championships | 2 | 56.07 | 3 | 95.77 | 3 | 151.84 |
| Dec 14–16, 2023 | (Czech Republic) 2024 Czech Championships (Note: In the Czech Republic, the Czech Championships are contested as part of the Four Nationals Championships.) | 1 | —N/a | 1 | —N/a | 1 | —N/a |
| Jan 8–14, 2024 | (Lithuania) 2024 European Championships | 13 | 52.49 | 14 | 92.14 | 13 | 144.63 |
| Jan 30 – Feb 4, 2024 | (Germany) 2024 Bavarian Open | 3 | 51.66 | 3 | 101.84 | 3 | 153.50 |
| Feb 22–25, 2024 | (Netherlands) 2024 Challenge Cup | 7 | 50.11 | 8 | 88.71 | 7 | 138.82 |

Results in the 2024–25 season
| Date | Event | SP | | FS | | Total | |
| Date | Event | P | Score | P | Score | P | Score |
|---|---|---|---|---|---|---|---|
| Sep 12–15, 2024 | (Italy) 2024 CS Lombardia Trophy | 7 | 50.13 | 8 | 87.51 | 8 | 136.37 |
| Nov 20–24, 2024 | (Poland) 2024 CS Warsaw Cup | 12 | 45.80 | 9 | 88.49 | 9 | 134.29 |

=== Pair skating with Jelizaveta Žuková ===
ISU personal best scores in the +5/-5 GOE System
| Segment | Type | Score | Event |
|---|---|---|---|
| Total | TSS | 159.73 | 2022 European Championships |
| Short program | TSS | 60.88 | 2021 CS Warsaw Cup |
| Short program | TES | 33.80 | 2021 CS Warsaw Cup |
| Short program | PCS | 27.69 | 2022 Winter Olympics (Team event) |
| Free skating | TSS | 105.33 | 2022 European Championships |
| Free skating | TES | 54.90 | 2022 European Championships |
| Free skating | PCS | 55.03 | 2022 Skate Canada International |

Results in the 2019–20 season
| Date | Event | SP | | FS | | Total | |
| Date | Event | P | Score | P | Score | P | Score |
|---|---|---|---|---|---|---|---|
| Dec 13–14, 2019 | (Czech Republic) 2020 Czech Championships (Note: As Jelizaveta Žuková had not yet been released from Russia to compete internationally, she and Martin Bidař competed in the Czech Championships, but not the Four Nationals Championships.) | 1 | 49.12 | 1 | 94.47 | 1 | 143.59 |

Results in the 2020–21 season
| Date | Event | SP | | FS | | Total | |
| Date | Event | P | Score | P | Score | P | Score |
|---|---|---|---|---|---|---|---|
| Sep 23–26, 2020 | (Germany) 2020 CS Nebelhorn Trophy | 5 | 51.20 | 4 | 91.83 | 4 | 143.03 |
| Dec 10–12, 2020 | (Poland) 2021 Four Nationals Championships | 1 | 55.83 | 1 | 87.67 | 1 | 143.50 |
| Dec 10–12, 2020 | (Poland) 2021 Czech Championships (Note: In the Czech Republic, the Czech Championships are contested as part of the Four Nationals Championships.) | 1 | —N/a | 1 | —N/a | 1 | —N/a |
| Feb 26–28, 2021 | (Netherlands) 2021 International Challenge Cup | 5 | 54.13 | 4 | 108.98 | 4 | 163.11 |
| Mar 22–28, 2021 | (Sweden) 2021 World Championships | 16 | 54.30 | 15 | 102.99 | 15 | 157.29 |

Results in the 2021–22 season
| Date | Event | SP | | FS | | Total | |
| Date | Event | P | Score | P | Score | P | Score |
|---|---|---|---|---|---|---|---|
| Oct 7–10, 2021 | (Finland) 2021 CS Finlandia Trophy | 9 | 48.36 | 10 | 93.90 | 9 | 142.26 |
| Oct 27–30, 2021 | (Ukraine) 2021 Autumn Talents Cup | 1 | 46.96 | 1 | 91.44 | 1 | 138.40 |
| Nov 17–20, 2021 | (Poland) 2021 CS Warsaw Cup | 8 | 60.88 | 12 | 96.25 | 12 | 157.13 |
| Jan 10–16, 2022 | (Estonia) 2022 European Championships | 15 | 54.40 | 10 | 105.33 | 12 | 159.73 |
| Feb 4–7, 2022 | (China) 2022 Winter Olympics (Team event) | 8 | 56.70 | —N/a | —N/a | 8 | —N/a |
| Feb 18–19, 2022 | (China) 2022 Winter Olympics | 17 | 54.64 | —N/a | —N/a | 17 | 54.64 |

Results in the 2022–23 season
| Date | Event | SP | | FS | | Total | |
| Date | Event | P | Score | P | Score | P | Score |
|---|---|---|---|---|---|---|---|
| Sep 21–24, 2022 | (Germany) 2022 CS Nebelhorn Trophy | 9 | 49.67 | 8 | 97.65 | 8 | 147.32 |
| Oct 28–30, 2022 | 2022 Skate Canada International | 6 | 52.84 | 7 | 100.66 | 6 | 153.50 |
