= 2017–18 figure skating season =

Competitive figure skating year, 2017/7/1 to 2018/6/30

- Date: July 1, 2017 – June 30, 2018
- Previous: 2016–17
- Next: 2018–19

The 2017–18 figure skating season began on July 1, 2017, and ended on June 30, 2018. During this season, elite skaters competed at the European Championships, Four Continents Championships, World Junior Championships, and World Championships, as well as the 2018 Winter Olympics. They also competed at elite events such as the Grand Prix series and Junior Grand Prix series, culminating at the Grand Prix Final, and the Challenger Series.

== Season notes ==
=== Age eligibility ===
Skaters were eligible to compete in International Skating Union (ISU) events at the junior or senior levels according to their age. These rules may not have applied to non-ISU events such as national championships.

Level	Date of birth
Junior (females in all disciplines; males in singles)	Born between July 1, 1998 & June 30, 2004
Junior (males in pairs & ice dance)	Born between July 1, 1996 & June 30, 2004
Senior (all disciplines)	Born before July 1, 2002

== Changes ==
If skaters of different nationalities formed a team, the ISU required that they choose one country to represent. The date provided is the date when the change occurred or, if not available, the date when the change was announced.

=== Partnership changes ===
Date	Skaters	Disc.	Type	Notes	Ref.
August 2, 2017	(Russia) Elena Ilinykh / Anton Shibnev	Ice dance	Formed		
December 20, 2017	(Russia) Elena Ilinykh / Anton Shibnev	Ice dance	Dissolved		
January 6, 2018	(Canada) Justine Brasseur / Mark Bardei	Pairs	Formed	For Canada	
January 29, 2018	(Israel) Isabella Tobias / Ilia Tkachenko	Ice dance	Dissolved	Tobias retired.	
February 1, 2018	(France) Lorenza Alessandrini / Pierre Souquet	Ice dance	Dissolved	Alessandrini retired.	
February 20, 2018	(France) Angélique Abachkina / Louis Thauron	Ice dance	Dissolved		
March 5, 2018	(Japan) Sumire Suto / Francis Boudreau-Audet	Pairs	Dissolved		
March 20, 2018	(United States) Elliana Pogrebinsky / Alex Benoit	Ice dance	Dissolved	Benoit retired.	
March 30, 2018	(Japan) Narumi Takahashi / Ryo Shibata	Pairs	Dissolved	Takahashi retired.	
April 10, 2018	(Canada) Liubov Ilyushechkina / Dylan Moscovitch	Pairs	Dissolved	Moscovitch retired.	
April 13, 2018	(United States) Jessica Calalang / Zack Sidhu	Pairs	Dissolved		
April 13, 2018	(United States) Chelsea Liu / Brian Johnson	Pairs	Dissolved		
April 13, 2018	(United States) Jessica Calalang / Brian Johnson	Pairs	Formed		
April 17, 2018	(United States) Marissa Castelli / Mervin Tran	Pairs	Dissolved		
April 27, 2018	(Czech Republic) Anna Dušková / Martin Bidař	Pairs	Dissolved		
April 29, 2018	(Israel) Paige Conners / Evgeni Krasnopolski	Pairs	Dissolved		
April 30, 2018	(France) Adelina Galayavieva / Louis Thauron	Ice dance	Formed		
May 2018	(Russia) Alla Loboda / Pavel Drozd	Ice dance	Dissolved		
May 2, 2018	(United States) Olivia Serafini / Mervin Tran	Pairs	Formed		
May 10, 2018	(Germany) Kavita Lorenz / Joti Polizoakis	Ice dance	Dissolved	Lorenz retired.	
June 9, 2018	(United States) Chelsea Liu / Ian Meyh	Pairs	Formed		
June 10, 2018	(China) Gao Yumeng / Xie Zhong	Pairs	Dissolved		
June 10, 2018	(China) Li Xiangning / Xie Zhong	Pairs	Formed		
June 24, 2018	(Russia) Kristina Astakhova / Alexei Rogonov	Pairs	Dissolved	Astakhova retired.	
June 27, 2018	(Czech Republic) Anna Dušková / Radek Jakubka	Pairs	Formed		

=== Retirements ===
Date	Skater(s)	Disc.	Ref.
August 28, 2017	(Russia) Yulia Lipnitskaya	Ladies	
September 22, 2017	(Russia) Yuko Kavaguti / Alexander Smirnov	Pairs	
November 7, 2017	(Sweden) Joshi Helgesson	Ladies	
November 16, 2017	(Germany) Franz Streubel	Men	
January 7, 2018	(South Korea) Kim Hae-jin	Ladies	
January 12, 2018	(Sweden) Isabelle Olsson	Ladies	
January 19, 2018	(Germany) Peter Liebers	Men	
January 29, 2018	(Israel) Isabella Tobias	Ice dance	
February 1, 2018	(France) Lorenza Alessandrini	Ice dance	
March 2, 2018	(Japan) Haruka Imai	Ladies	
March 9, 2018	(Spain) Celia Robledo / Luis Fenero	Ice dance	
March 16, 2018	(Japan) Takahito Mura	Men	
March 20, 2018	(United States) Alex Benoit	Ice dance	
March 25, 2018	(Turkey) Alisa Agafonova / Alper Uçar	Ice dance	
March 25, 2018	(Uzbekistan) Misha Ge	Men	
March 30, 2018	(Japan) Narumi Takahashi	Pairs	
April 10, 2018	(Canada) Dylan Moscovitch	Pairs	
April 16, 2018	(Canada) Patrick Chan	Men	
April 19, 2018	(United States) Max Aaron	Men	
April 23, 2018	(Slovakia) Lucie Myslivečková / Lukáš Csölley	Ice dance	
April 25, 2018	(Canada) Meagan Duhamel / Eric Radford	Pairs	
May 4, 2018	(Canada) Elladj Baldé	Men	
May 10, 2018	(Germany) Kavita Lorenz	Ice dance	
May 14, 2018	(Canada) Liam Firus	Men	
June 4, 2018	(Norway) Anne Line Gjersem	Ladies	
June 14, 2018	(Japan) Daisuke Murakami	Men	
June 24, 2018	(Russia) Kristina Astakhova	Pairs	

=== Coaching changes ===
Date	Skater(s)	Disc.	From	To	Ref.
March 19, 2018	(Russia) Serafima Sakhanovich	Ladies	Evgeni Plushenko	Angelina Turenko	
March 25, 2018	(Japan) Misato Komatsubara / Tim Koleto	Ice dance	Barbara Fusar-Poli & Stefano Caruso	Marie-France Dubreuil, Patrice Lauzon & Romain Haguenauer	
March 28, 2018	(Russia) Anastasiia Gubanova	Ladies	Angelina Turenko	Elena Buianova	
March 30, 2018	(Japan) Marin Honda	Ladies	Mie Hamada & Yamato Tamura	Rafael Arutyunyan	
April 5, 2018	(Russia) Maxim Kovtun	Men	Inna Goncharenko	Elena Buianova	
April 11, 2018	(Russia) Betina Popova / Sergey Mozgov	Ice dance	Ksenia Rumiantseva & Ekaterina Volobueva	Anjelika Krylova & Elena Tchaikovskaia	
April 18, 2018	(South Korea) Lim Eun-soo	Ladies	Chi Hyun-jung	Rafael Arutyunyan	
April 20, 2018	(United States) Kaitlin Hawayek / Jean-Luc Baker	Ice dance	Pasquale Camerlengo & Anjelika Krylova	Marie-France Dubreuil & Patrice Lauzon	
May 7, 2018	(Russia) Evgenia Medvedeva	Ladies	Eteri Tutberidze	Brian Orser & Tracy Wilson	
May 7, 2018	(Russia) Polina Tsurskaya	Ladies	Eteri Tutberidze	Elena Buianova	
May 8, 2018	(Russia) Sergei Voronov	Men	Inna Goncharenko	Elena Buianova	
May 14, 2018	(United States) Alexa Scimeca Knierim / Chris Knierim	Pairs	Dalilah Sappenfield	Aljona Savchenko, Alexander König & Jean-François Ballester	
May 15, 2018	(Russia) Evgenia Tarasova / Vladimir Morozov	Pairs	Nina Mozer, Andrei Hekalo & Robin Szolkowy	Maxim Trankov & Robin Szolkowy	
May 24, 2018	(United States) Haven Denney / Brandon Frazier	Pairs	Rockne Brubaker & Stefania Berton	John Zimmerman, Silvia Fontana & Jeremy Barrett	
May 25, 2018	(United States) Madison Chock / Evan Bates	Ice dance	Igor Shpilband	Marie-France Dubreuil, Patrice Lauzon & Romain Haguenauer	
May 29, 2018	(United States) Jason Brown	Men	Kori Ade	Brian Orser & Tracy Wilson	
June 5, 2018	(Kazakhstan) Elizabet Tursynbaeva	Ladies	Brian Orser & Tracy Wilson	Eteri Tutberidze	
June 9, 2018	(Australia) Ekaterina Alexandrovskaya / Harley Windsor	Pairs	Nina Mozer, Andrei Pachin & Galina Pachin	Richard Gauthier	
June 12, 2018	(United States) Alexei Krasnozhon	Men	Peter Cain & Darlene Cain	Olga Ganicheva & Alexey Letov	
June 20, 2018	(China) Yan Han	Men	Xu Zhaoxiao & Fu Caishu	Pang Qing & Tong Jian	
June 28, 2018	(United States) Andrew Torgashev	Men	Artem Torgashev & Ilona Melnichenko	Christy Krall	
June 29, 2018	(United States) Gracie Gold	Ladies	Marina Zueva & Oleg Epstein	Vincent Restencourt	

=== Nationality changes ===
Date	Skater(s)	Disc.	From	To	Notes	Ref.
January 6, 2018	Mark Bardei	Pairs	Ukraine	Canada	Partnering with Justine Brasseur	
March 1, 2018	Laurence Fournier Beaudry / Nikolaj Sørensen	Ice dance	Denmark	Canada	Fournier Beaudry was unable to get Danish citizenship.	

== International competitions ==
Code key

- S – Senior event
- J – Junior event
- N – Novice event
- M – Men's singles
- L – Ladies' singles
- P – Pair skating
- D – Ice dance

Color key

- Winter Olympics
- ISU Championships
- Grand Prix or Junior Grand Prix
- Challenger Series
- Other competition

2017
Dates	Event	Type	Level	Disc.	Location	Results
July 27–29	Lake Placid Ice Dance International	Other	All	D	Lake Placid, United States	Details
August 2–5	Asian Open Trophy	Other	All	M/L/P	Hong Kong	Details
August 3–5	Philadelphia Summer International	Other	S/J	M/L	Philadelphia, United States	Details
August 23–26	JGP Australia	Grand Prix	Junior	M/L/D	Brisbane, Australia	Details
August 26–27	Southeast Asian Games	Other	Senior	M/L	Kuala Lumpur, Malaysia	Details
August 31 – September 2	JGP Austria	Grand Prix	Junior	M/L/D	Salzburg, Austria	Details
September 2–5	Slovenia Open	Other	Senior	M/L	Celje, Slovenia	Details
September 6–9	JGP Latvia	Grand Prix	Junior	All	Riga, Latvia	Details
September 13–17	U.S. International Classic	Challenger	Senior	All	Salt Lake City, United States	Details
September 14–17	Lombardia Trophy	Challenger	S/J	All	Bergamo, Italy	Details
September 20–24	JGP Belarus	Grand Prix	Junior	All	Minsk, Belarus	Details
September 20–23	Autumn Classic International	Challenger	S/J	All	Montreal, Canada	Details
September 21–23	Ondrej Nepela Trophy	Challenger	Senior	All	Bratislava, Slovakia	Details
September 27–30	JGP Croatia	Grand Prix	Junior	All	Zagreb, Croatia	Details
September 27–30	Nebelhorn Trophy	Challenger	Senior	All	Oberstdorf, Germany	Details
October 4–7	JGP Poland	Grand Prix	Junior	All	Gdańsk, Poland	Details
October 6–8	Finlandia Trophy	Challenger	Senior	All	Espoo, Finland	Details
October 11–14	JGP Italy	Grand Prix	Junior	M/L/D	Egna, Italy	Details
October 11–15	International Cup of Nice	Other	S/J	All	Nice, France	Details
October 19–23	Kaunas Ice Autumn Cup	Other	All	M/L	Kaunas, Lithuania	Details
October 20–22	Rostelecom Cup	Grand Prix	Senior	All	Moscow, Russia	Details
October 21–23	Halloween Cup	Other	J/N	M/L/D	Budapest, Hungary	Details
October 24–28	Crystal Skate of Romania	Other	All	M/L	Bucharest, Romania	Details
October 25–29	Golden Bear of Zagreb	Other	All	M/L	Zagreb, Croatia	Details
October 26–29	Minsk-Arena Ice Star	Challenger	All	All	Minsk, Belarus	Details 1, 2
October 27–29	Skate Canada International	Grand Prix	Senior	All	Regina, Canada	Details
November 1–4	Denkova-Staviski Cup	Other	All	M/L	Sofia, Bulgaria	Details
November 2–5	Tirnavia Ice Cup	Other	J/N	M/L	Trnava, Slovakia	Details
November 3–5	Cup of China	Grand Prix	Senior	All	Beijing, China	Details
November 8–12	Volvo Open Cup	Other	All	All	Riga, Latvia	Details
November 8–12	Ice Challenge	Other	All	All	Graz, Austria	Details 1, 2
November 10–12	NHK Trophy	Grand Prix	Senior	All	Osaka, Japan	Details
November 16–19	Warsaw Cup	Challenger	Senior	All	Warsaw, Poland	Details
November 16–19	Merano Cup	Other	All	M/L	Merano, Italy	Details
November 17–19	Internationaux de France	Grand Prix	Senior	All	Grenoble, France	Details
November 20–25	Cup of Tyrol	Other	All	M/L/P	Innsbruck, Austria	Details
November 21–26	Tallinn Trophy	Challenger	All	All	Tallinn, Estonia	Details
November 22–26	Open d'Andorra	Other	All	M/L/D	Canillo, Andorra	Details
November 22–26	Skate Celje	Other	J/N	M/L/P	Celje, Slovenia	Details
November 24–26	Shanghai Trophy	Other	Senior	All	Shanghai, China	Details
November 24–26	Skate America	Grand Prix	Senior	All	Lake Placid, United States	Details
December 4–10	Santa Claus Cup	Other	All	M/L/D	Budapest, Hungary	Details
December 6–9	Golden Spin of Zagreb	Challenger	Senior	All	Zagreb, Croatia	Details
December 7–10	Grand Prix Final	Grand Prix	S/J	All	Nagoya, Japan	Details
December 12–16	Istanbul Bosphorous Cup	Other	All	M/L/D	Istanbul, Turkey	Details
December 15–17	Grand Prix of Bratislava	Other	J/N	M/L/D	Bratislava, Slovakia	Details

2018
Dates	Event	Type	Level	Disc.	Location	Results
January 4–7	EduSport Trophy	Other	Senior	L	Bucharest, Romania	Details
January 4–7	EduSport Trophy	Other	J/N	M/L	Bucharest, Romania	Details
January 4–7	FBMA Trophy	Other	All	M/L	Abu Dhabi, United Arab Emirates	Details
January 15–21	European Championships	Championships	Senior	All	Moscow, Russia	Details
January 22–27	Four Continents Championships	Championships	Senior	All	Taipei, Taiwan	Details
January 23–27	Skate Helena	Other	Senior	L	Belgrade, Serbia	Details
January 23–27	Skate Helena	Other	J/N	M/L	Belgrade, Serbia	Details
January 26	Reykjavík International Games	Other	All	M/L	Reykjavík, Iceland	Details
January 26–31	Bavarian Open	Other	All	All	Oberstdorf, Germany	Details
January 30 – February 4	Mentor Toruń Cup	Other	All	All	Toruń, Poland	Details
January 31 – February 2	Open Ice Mall Cup	Other	J/N	L/P	Eilat, Israel	Details
February 1–4	Nordic Championships	Other	All	M/L	Rovaniemi, Finland	Details
February 2–4	Egna Dance Trophy	Other	All	D	Egna, Italy	Details
February 6–11	Sofia Trophy	Other	All	M/L	Sofia, Bulgaria	Details
February 8–11	Dragon Trophy	Other	All	M/L	Ljubljana, Slovenia	Details
February 9–25	Winter Olympics	Olympics	Senior	All	Pyeongchang, South Korea	Details
February 14–18	Olympic Hopes	Other	J/N	M/L	Targu Secuiesc, Romania	Details
February 16–18	Jégvirág Cup	Other	All	M/L/D	Miskolc, Hungary	Details
February 22–25	International Challenge Cup	Other	All	M/L/P	The Hague, Netherlands	Details
March 1–4	Sarajevo Open	Other	All	M/L/P	Sarajevo, Bosnia and Herzegovina	Details
March 5–11	World Junior Championships	Championships	Junior	All	Sofia, Bulgaria	Details
March 16–18	Coupe du Printemps	Other	All	M/L	Luxembourg, Luxembourg	Details
March 19–25	World Championships	Championships	Senior	All	Milan, Italy	Details
March 30 – April 1	Balkan Games	Other	Senior	L	Celje, Slovenia	Details
March 30 – April 1	Balkan Games	Other	J/N	M/L	Celje, Slovenia	Details
April 4–8	Triglav Trophy	Other	All	M/L	Jesenice, Slovenia	Details
April 5–8	Egna Spring Trophy	Other	All	M/L/P	Egna, Italy	Details

== International medalists ==
=== Men's singles ===
Olympics
Competition	Gold	Silver	Bronze	Results
(South Korea) Winter Olympics	(Japan) Yuzuru Hanyu	(Japan) Shoma Uno	(Spain) Javier Fernández	Details

Championships
Competition	Gold	Silver	Bronze	Results
(Russia) European Championships	(Spain) Javier Fernández	(Russia) Dmitri Aliev	(Russia) Mikhail Kolyada	Details
(Taiwan) Four Continents Championships	(China) Jin Boyang	(Japan) Shoma Uno	(United States) Jason Brown	Details
(Bulgaria) World Junior Championships	(Russia) Alexey Erokhov	(Russia) Artur Danielian	(Italy) Matteo Rizzo	Details
(Italy) World Championships	(United States) Nathan Chen	(Japan) Shoma Uno	(Russia) Mikhail Kolyada	Details

Grand Prix
Competition	Gold	Silver	Bronze	Results
(Russia) Rostelecom Cup	(United States) Nathan Chen	(Japan) Yuzuru Hanyu	(Russia) Mikhail Kolyada	Details
Skate Canada International	(Japan) Shoma Uno	(United States) Jason Brown	(Russia) Alexander Samarin	Details
Cup of China	(Russia) Mikhail Kolyada	(China) Jin Boyang	(United States) Max Aaron	Details
(Japan) NHK Trophy	(Russia) Sergei Voronov	(United States) Adam Rippon	(Israel) Oleksii Bychenko	Details
Internationaux de France	(Spain) Javier Fernández	(Japan) Shoma Uno	(Uzbekistan) Misha Ge	Details
(United States) Skate America	(United States) Nathan Chen	(United States) Adam Rippon	(Russia) Sergei Voronov	Details
(Japan) Grand Prix Final	(United States) Nathan Chen	(Japan) Shoma Uno	(Russia) Mikhail Kolyada	Details

Junior Grand Prix
Competition	Gold	Silver	Bronze	Results
JGP Australia	(United States) Alexei Krasnozhon	(Russia) Roman Savosin	(Russia) Egor Rukhin	Details
JGP Austria	(United States) Camden Pulkinen	(France) Luc Economides	(Russia) Egor Murashov	Details
JGP Latvia	(Japan) Mitsuki Sumoto	(Russia) Makar Ignatov	(United States) Tomoki Hiwatashi	Details
JGP Belarus	(Russia) Alexey Erokhov	(United States) Andrew Torgashev	(Russia) Igor Efimchuk	Details
JGP Croatia	(United States) Alexei Krasnozhon	(Canada) Joseph Phan	(Russia) Makar Ignatov	Details
JGP Poland	(Russia) Alexey Erokhov	(United States) Camden Pulkinen	(Canada) Conrad Orzel	Details
JGP Italy	(Italy) Matteo Rizzo	(Russia) Vladimir Samoilov	(United States) Tomoki Hiwatashi	Details
(Japan) JGP Final	(United States) Alexei Krasnozhon	(United States) Camden Pulkinen	(Japan) Mitsuki Sumoto	Details

Challenger Series
Competition	Gold	Silver	Bronze	Results
(United States) U.S. International Classic	(United States) Nathan Chen	(United States) Max Aaron	(Canada) Liam Firus	Details
(Italy) Lombardia Trophy	(Japan) Shoma Uno	(United States) Jason Brown	(Australia) Brendan Kerry	Details
(Canada) Autumn Classic International	(Spain) Javier Fernández	(Japan) Yuzuru Hanyu	(Canada) Keegan Messing	Details
(Slovakia) Ondrej Nepela Trophy	(Russia) Mikhail Kolyada	(Russia) Sergei Voronov	(Australia) Brendan Kerry	Details
(Germany) Nebelhorn Trophy	(Belgium) Jorik Hendrickx	(United States) Alexander Johnson	(Sweden) Alexander Majorov	Details
(Finland) Finlandia Trophy	(China) Jin Boyang	(United States) Vincent Zhou	(United States) Adam Rippon	Details
(Belarus) Minsk-Arena Ice Star	(Russia) Sergei Voronov	(Georgia (country)) Moris Kvitelashvili	(Israel) Daniel Samohin	Details
(Poland) Warsaw Cup	(Italy) Matteo Rizzo	(Switzerland) Stéphane Walker	(Canada) Liam Firus	Details
(Estonia) Tallinn Trophy	(Russia) Dmitri Aliev	(United States) Alexei Krasnozhon	(Ukraine) Yaroslav Paniot	Details
(Croatia) Golden Spin of Zagreb	(Georgia (country)) Moris Kvitelashvili	(Israel) Oleksii Bychenko	(Russia) Artur Dmitriev, Jr.	Details

Other international competitions
Competition	Gold	Silver	Bronze	Results
(Hong Kong) Asian Open Trophy	(Japan) Keiji Tanaka	(Japan) Ryuju Hino	(South Korea) An Geon-hyeong	Details
(United States) Philadelphia Summer International	(United States) Timothy Dolensky	(Ukraine) Yaroslav Paniot	(United States) Max Aaron	Details
(Malaysia) Southeast Asian Games	(Malaysia) Julian Zhi-Jie Yee	(Philippines) Michael Christian Martinez	(Malaysia) Kai Xiang Chew	Details
Slovenia Open	(Poland) Igor Reznichenko	(Netherlands) Thomas Kennes	(Switzerland) Stéphane Walker	Details
(France) Cup of Nice	(China) Yan Han	(Belgium) Jorik Hendrickx	(Germany) Peter Liebers	Details
(Lithuania) Kaunas Ice Autumn Cup	(Italy) Ivan Righini	(Netherlands) Thomas Kennes	No other competitors	Details
Crystal Skate of Romania	(France) Philip Warren	(Romania) Dorjan Kecskes	No other competitors	Details
(Croatia) Golden Bear of Zagreb	(Italy) Daniel Grassl	(United Kingdom) Graham Newberry	(Switzerland) Lukas Britschgi	Details
(Bulgaria) Denkova-Staviski Cup	(France) Kevin Aymoz	(Turkey) Başar Oktar	(Turkey) Burak Demirboğa	Details
(Latvia) Volvo Open Cup	(Italy) Ivan Righini	(Italy) Maurizio Zandron	(United Kingdom) Phillip Harris	Details
(Austria) Ice Challenge	(Italy) Daniel Grassl	(Spain) Javier Raya	(France) Adrien Tesson	Details
(Italy) Merano Cup	(United Kingdom) Graham Newberry	(Spain) Javier Raya	(Italy) Daniel Grassl	Details
(Austria) Cup of Tyrol	(Latvia) Deniss Vasiļjevs	(Italy) Matteo Rizzo	(France) Chafik Besseghier	Details
Open d'Andorra	(Spain) Felipe Montoya	(France) Joshua Rols	(South Africa) Mathew Ayne Samuels	Details
(China) Shanghai Trophy	(Russia) Alexander Samarin	(Georgia (country)) Moris Kvitelashvili	(Kazakhstan) Denis Ten	Details
(Hungary) Santa Claus Cup	(Russia) Konstantin Milyukov	(Italy) Daniel Grassl	(France) Philip Warren	Details
(Turkey) Istanbul Bosphorous Cup	(Turkey) Engin Ali Artan	(Turkey) Burak Demirboğa	(Turkey) Başar Oktar	Details
(United Arab Emirates) FBMA Trophy	(Armenia) Slavik Hayrapetyan	(Republic of Ireland) Conor Stakelum	No other competitors	Details
(Iceland) Reykjavík International Games	(France) Adrien Tesson	No other competitors		Details
(Germany) Bavarian Open	(Italy) Maurizio Zandron	(Switzerland) Lukas Britschgi	(Czech Republic) Petr Kotlařík	Details
(Poland) Mentor Toruń Cup	(Italy) Daniel Grassl	(United Kingdom) Peter James Hallam	(Italy) Jari Kessler	Details
(Finland) Nordic Championships	(Sweden) Alexander Majorov	(Finland) Valtter Virtanen	(Norway) Sondre Oddvoll Bøe	Details
(Bulgaria) Sofia Trophy	(Italy) Maurizio Zandron	(Italy) Mattia Dalla Torre	(Italy) Marco Zandron	Details
(Slovenia) Dragon Trophy	(Switzerland) Nurullah Sahaka	(Italy) Alessandro Fadini	(Hungary) Alexander Borovoj	Details
(Hungary) Jégvirág Cup	(Estonia) Daniel-Albert Naurits	No other competitors		Details
(Netherlands) International Challenge Cup	(France) Adrien Tesson	(Italy) Daniel Grassl	(Finland) Valtter Virtanen	Details
(Bosnia and Herzegovina) Sarajevo Open	(Germany) Fabian Piontek	(Czech Republic) Tomás Kupka	No other competitors	Details
(Luxembourg) Coupe du Printemps	(Sweden) Alexander Majorov	(Japan) Kazuki Tomono	(France) Romain Ponsart	Details
(Slovenia) Triglav Trophy	(Hungary) Alexander Borovoj	(Italy) Alessandro Fadini	(Austria) Manuel Drechsler	Details
(Italy) Egna Spring Trophy	(Italy) Daniel Grassl	(Italy) Mattia Dalla Torre	(Italy) Jari Kessler	Details

=== Ladies' singles ===
Olympics
Competition	Gold	Silver	Bronze	Results
(South Korea) Winter Olympics	(International Olympic Committee) Alina Zagitova	(International Olympic Committee) Evgenia Medvedeva	(Canada) Kaetlyn Osmond	Details

Championships
Competition	Gold	Silver	Bronze	Results
(Russia) European Championships	(Russia) Alina Zagitova	(Russia) Evgenia Medvedeva	(Italy) Carolina Kostner	Details
(Taiwan) Four Continents Championships	(Japan) Kaori Sakamoto	(Japan) Mai Mihara	(Japan) Satoko Miyahara	Details
(Bulgaria) World Junior Championships	(Russia) Alexandra Trusova	(Russia) Alena Kostornaia	(Japan) Mako Yamashita	Details
(Italy) World Championships	(Canada) Kaetlyn Osmond	(Japan) Wakaba Higuchi	(Japan) Satoko Miyahara	Details

Grand Prix
Competition	Gold	Silver	Bronze	Results
(Russia) Rostelecom Cup	(Russia) Evgenia Medvedeva	(Italy) Carolina Kostner	(Japan) Wakaba Higuchi	Details
Skate Canada International	(Canada) Kaetlyn Osmond	(Russia) Maria Sotskova	(United States) Ashley Wagner	Details
Cup of China	(Russia) Alina Zagitova	(Japan) Wakaba Higuchi	(Russia) Elena Radionova	Details
(Japan) NHK Trophy	(Russia) Evgenia Medvedeva	(Italy) Carolina Kostner	(Russia) Polina Tsurskaya	Details
Internationaux de France	(Russia) Alina Zagitova	(Russia) Maria Sotskova	(Canada) Kaetlyn Osmond	Details
(United States) Skate America	(Japan) Satoko Miyahara	(Japan) Kaori Sakamoto	(United States) Bradie Tennell	Details
(Japan) Grand Prix Final	(Russia) Alina Zagitova	(Russia) Maria Sotskova	(Canada) Kaetlyn Osmond	Details

Junior Grand Prix
Competition	Gold	Silver	Bronze	Results
JGP Australia	(Russia) Alexandra Trusova	(Russia) Anastasia Gulyakova	(Japan) Riko Takino	Details
JGP Austria	(Russia) Anastasia Tarakanova	(South Korea) Lim Eun-soo	(Japan) Mako Yamashita	Details
JGP Latvia	(Russia) Daria Panenkova	(Japan) Rika Kihira	(United States) Emmy Ma	Details
JGP Belarus	(Russia) Alexandra Trusova	(Japan) Nana Araki	(Russia) Stanislava Konstantinova	Details
JGP Croatia	(Russia) Sofia Samodurova	(Japan) Mako Yamashita	(Russia) Anastasia Tarakanova	Details
JGP Poland	(Russia) Alena Kostornaia	(Russia) Daria Panenkova	(Japan) Rino Kasakake	Details
JGP Italy	(Russia) Sofia Samodurova	(Russia) Alena Kostornaia	(Japan) Rika Kihira	Details
(Japan) JGP Final	(Russia) Alexandra Trusova	(Russia) Alena Kostornaia	(Russia) Anastasia Tarakanova	Details

Challenger Series
Competition	Gold	Silver	Bronze	Results
(United States) U.S. International Classic	(Japan) Marin Honda	(United States) Mirai Nagasu	(United States) Karen Chen	Details
(Italy) Lombardia Trophy	(Russia) Alina Zagitova	(Japan) Wakaba Higuchi	(Italy) Carolina Kostner	Details
(Canada) Autumn Classic International	(Canada) Kaetlyn Osmond	(Japan) Mai Mihara	(Kazakhstan) Elizabet Tursynbaeva	Details
(Slovakia) Ondrej Nepela Trophy	(Russia) Evgenia Medvedeva	(Japan) Rika Hongo	(Russia) Elena Radionova	Details
(Germany) Nebelhorn Trophy	(Australia) Kailani Craine	(Sweden) Matilda Algotsson	(Switzerland) Alexia Paganini	Details
(Finland) Finlandia Trophy	(Russia) Maria Sotskova	(Italy) Carolina Kostner	(Russia) Elizaveta Tuktamysheva	Details
(Belarus) Minsk-Arena Ice Star	(Kazakhstan) Elizabet Tursynbaeva	(Russia) Serafima Sakhanovich	(South Korea) An So-hyun	Details
(Poland) Warsaw Cup	(Russia) Serafima Sakhanovich	(Russia) Stanislava Konstantinova	(United States) Courtney Hicks	Details
(Estonia) Tallinn Trophy	(Russia) Stanislava Konstantinova	(Russia) Alisa Fedichkina	(Germany) Nicole Schott	Details
(Croatia) Golden Spin of Zagreb	(Russia) Stanislava Konstantinova	(Russia) Alisa Fedichkina	(Russia) Elizaveta Tuktamysheva	Details

Other international competitions
Competition	Gold	Silver	Bronze	Results
(Hong Kong) Asian Open Trophy	(Japan) Kaori Sakamoto	(Japan) Yuna Shiraiwa	(Australia) Kailani Craine	Details
(United States) Philadelphia Summer International	(United States) Bradie Tennell	(United States) Angela Wang	(South Korea) Kim Ha-nul	Details
(Malaysia) Southeast Asian Games	(Singapore) Yu Shuran	(Singapore) Chloe Ing	(Philippines) Alisson Perticheto	Details
Slovenia Open	(Switzerland) Alexia Paganini	(Australia) Kailani Craine	(Germany) Nathalie Weinzierl	Details
(France) Cup of Nice	(Russia) Alisa Fedichkina	(China) Li Xiangning	(Ukraine) Anna Khnychenkova	Details
(Lithuania) Kaunas Ice Autumn Cup	(Lithuania) Elžbieta Kropa	(Estonia) Gerli Liinamäe	(Serbia) Antonina Dubinina	Details
Crystal Skate of Romania	(Poland) Elzbieta Gabryszak	(Finland) Salliana Ozturk	(Finland) Karolina Luhtonen	Details
(Croatia) Golden Bear of Zagreb	(Latvia) Diāna Ņikitina	(Slovenia) Daša Grm	(Sweden) Matilda Algotsson	Details
(Bulgaria) Denkova-Staviski Cup	(Italy) Micol Cristini	(France) Lea Serna	(United Kingdom) Natasha McKay	Details
(Latvia) Volvo Open Cup	(Estonia) Gerli Liinamäe	(Brazil) Isadora Williams	(United Kingdom) Danielle Harrison	Details
(Austria) Ice Challenge	(Slovenia) Dasa Grm	(Italy) Giada Russo	(Austria) Natalie Klotz	Details
(Italy) Merano Cup	(Italy) Giada Russo	(United Kingdom) Natasha McKay	(Singapore) Chloe Ing	Details
(Austria) Cup of Tyrol	(Italy) Giada Russo	(Latvia) Diana Nikitina	(Norway) Anne Line Gjersem	Details
Open d'Andorra	(Netherlands) Kyarha Van Tiel	(Finland) Oona Ounasvuori	(Finland) Emilia Toikkanen	Details
(China) Shanghai Trophy	(Russia) Elena Radionova	(Kazakhstan) Elizabet Tursynbaeva	(Russia) Maria Sotskova	Details
(Hungary) Santa Claus Cup	(Hungary) Ivett Tóth	(Belgium) Loena Hendrickx	(Italy) Micol Cristini	Details
(Turkey) Istanbul Bosphorous Cup	(Netherlands) Niki Wories	(Turkey) Sıla Saygı	(Australia) Amelia Jakson	Details
(Romania) EduSport Trophy	(Italy) Lucrezia Gennaro	(Greece) Dimitra Korri	(Romania) Irina Preda	Details
(United Arab Emirates) FBMA Trophy	(Finland) Emmi Peltonen	(Azerbaijan) Morgan Flood	(Kazakhstan) Aiza Mambekova	Details
(Serbia) Skate Helena	(Czech Republic) Eliška Březinová	(Austria) Kerstin Frank	(Slovakia) Nina Letenayova	Details
(Iceland) Reykjavík International Games	(Azerbaijan) Morgan Flood	(Australia) Katie Pasfield	(Iceland) Eva Dögg Sæmundsdóttir	Details
(Germany) Bavarian Open	(Japan) Rin Nitaya	(Japan) Yura Matsuda	(Germany) Nathalie Weinzierl	Details
(Poland) Mentor Toruń Cup	(Netherlands) Niki Wories	(Czech Republic) Eliška Březinová	(United Kingdom) Nina Povey	Details
(Finland) Nordic Championships	(Finland) Viveca Lindfors	(Sweden) Anita Östlund	(Sweden) Josefin Taljegard	Details
(Bulgaria) Sofia Trophy	(Italy) Micol Cristini	(Italy) Elisabetta Leccardi	(Singapore) Chloe Ing	Details
(Slovenia) Dragon Trophy	(Germany) Nathalie Weinzierl	(Finland) Viveca Lindfors	(Italy) Anna Memola	Details
(Hungary) Jégvirág Cup	(Italy) Elisabetta Leccardi	(Azerbaijan) Morgan Flood	(Italy) Micol Cristini	Details
(Netherlands) International Challenge Cup	(Japan) Wakaba Higuchi	(Japan) Rika Hongo	(Japan) Marin Honda	Details
(Bosnia and Herzegovina) Sarajevo Open	(Austria) Sophia Schaller	(Austria) Kerstin Frank	(Italy) Lucrezia Gennaro	Details
(Luxembourg) Coupe du Printemps	(Japan) Mai Mihara	(Japan) Kaori Sakamoto	(Japan) Yuna Shiraiwa	Details
(Slovenia) Balkan Games	(Romania) Julija Sauter	(Slovenia) Marusa Udrih	(Greece) Dimitra Korri	Details
(Slovenia) Triglav Trophy	(Italy) Lucrezia Gennaro	(Switzerland) Yoonmi Lehmann	(Singapore) Ceciliane Mei Ling Hartmann	Details
(Italy) Egna Spring Trophy	(Germany) Nathalie Weinzierl	(Italy) Elettra Maria Olivotto	(Romania) Julia Sauter	Details

=== Pairs ===
Olympics
Competition	Gold	Silver	Bronze	Results
(South Korea) Winter Olympics	(Germany) Aljona Savchenko / Bruno Massot	(China) Sui Wenjing / Han Cong	(Canada) Meagan Duhamel / Eric Radford	Details

Championships
Competition	Gold	Silver	Bronze	Results
(Russia) European Championships	(Russia) Evgenia Tarasova / Vladimir Morozov	(Russia) Ksenia Stolbova / Fedor Klimov	(Russia) Natalia Zabiiako / Alexander Enbert	Details
(Taiwan) Four Continents Championships	(United States) Tarah Kayne / Danny O'Shea	(United States) Ashley Cain / Timothy LeDuc	(North Korea) Ryom Tae-ok / Kim Ju-sik	Details
(Bulgaria) World Junior Championships	(Russia) Daria Pavliuchenko / Denis Khodykin	(Russia) Polina Kostiukovich / Dmitrii Ialin	(Russia) Anastasia Mishina / Aleksandr Galiamov	Details
(Italy) World Championships	(Germany) Aljona Savchenko / Bruno Massot	(Russia) Evgenia Tarasova / Vladimir Morozov	(France) Vanessa James / Morgan Ciprès	Details

Grand Prix
Competition	Gold	Silver	Bronze	Results
(Russia) Rostelecom Cup	(Russia) Evgenia Tarasova / Vladimir Morozov	(Russia) Ksenia Stolbova / Fedor Klimov	(Russia) Kristina Astakhova / Alexei Rogonov	Details
Skate Canada International	(Canada) Meagan Duhamel / Eric Radford	(Germany) Aliona Savchenko / Bruno Massot	(France) Vanessa James / Morgan Ciprès	Details
Cup of China	(China) Sui Wenjing / Han Cong	(China) Yu Xiaoyu / Zhang Hao	(Canada) Kirsten Moore-Towers / Michael Marinaro	Details
(Japan) NHK Trophy	(China) Sui Wenjing / Han Cong	(Russia) Ksenia Stolbova / Fedor Klimov	(Russia) Kristina Astakhova / Alexei Rogonov	Details
Internationaux de France	(Russia) Evgenia Tarasova / Vladimir Morozov	(France) Vanessa James / Morgan Ciprès	(Italy) Nicole Della Monica / Matteo Guarise	Details
(United States) Skate America	(Germany) Aljona Savchenko / Bruno Massot	(China) Yu Xiaoyu / Zhang Hao	(Canada) Meagan Duhamel / Eric Radford	Details
(Japan) Grand Prix Final	(Germany) Aljona Savchenko / Bruno Massot	(China) Sui Wenjing / Han Cong	(Canada) Meagan Duhamel / Eric Radford	Details

Junior Grand Prix
Competition	Gold	Silver	Bronze	Results
JGP Latvia	(Russia) Apollinariia Panfilova / Dmitry Rylov	(Russia) Aleksandra Boikova / Dmitrii Kozlovskii	(Canada) Evelyn Walsh / Trennt Michaud	Details
JGP Belarus	(Russia) Daria Pavliuchenko / Denis Khodykin	(Russia) Anastasia Poluianova / Dmitry Sopot	(Russia) Apollinariia Panfilova / Dmitry Rylov	Details
JGP Croatia	(Russia) Polina Kostiukovich / Dmitrii Ialin	(China) Gao Yumeng / Xie Zhong	(Russia) Aleksandra Boikova / Dmitrii Kozlovskii	Details
JGP Poland	(Australia) Ekaterina Alexandrovskaya / Harley Windsor	(Russia) Daria Pavliuchenko / Denis Khodykin	(Russia) Anastasia Poluianova / Dmitry Sopot	Details
(Japan) JGP Final	(Australia) Ekaterina Alexandrovskaya / Harley Windsor	(Russia) Apollinariia Panfilova / Dmitry Rylov	(Russia) Daria Pavliuchenko / Denis Khodykin	Details

Challenger Series
Competition	Gold	Silver	Bronze	Results
(United States) U.S. International Classic	(Canada) Kirsten Moore-Towers / Michael Marinaro	(United States) Alexa Scimeca Knierim / Chris Knierim	(United States) Chelsea Liu / Brian Johnson	Details
(Italy) Lombardia Trophy	(Russia) Natalia Zabiiako / Alexander Enbert	(Italy) Nicole Della Monica / Matteo Guarise	(Italy) Valentina Marchei / Ondřej Hotárek	Details
(Canada) Autumn Classic International	(France) Vanessa James / Morgan Ciprès	(Canada) Meagan Duhamel / Eric Radford	(Canada) Julianne Séguin / Charlie Bilodeau	Details
(Slovakia) Ondrej Nepela Trophy	(Russia) Natalia Zabiiako / Alexander Enbert	(Russia) Kristina Astakhova / Alexei Rogonov	(Russia) Alisa Efimova / Alexander Korovin	Details
(Germany) Nebelhorn Trophy	(Russia) Evgenia Tarasova / Vladimir Morozov	(Germany) Aliona Savchenko / Bruno Massot	(Australia) Ekaterina Alexandrovskaya / Harley Windsor	Details
(Finland) Finlandia Trophy	(China) Peng Cheng / Jin Yang	(Italy) Nicole Della Monica / Matteo Guarise	(Russia) Ksenia Stolbova / Fedor Klimov	Details
(Belarus) Minsk-Arena Ice Star	(Russia) Aleksandra Boikova / Dmitrii Kozlovskii	(Germany) Annika Hocke / Ruben Blommaert	(Israel) Paige Conners / Evgeni Krasnopolski	Details
(Poland) Warsaw Cup	(Italy) Valentina Marchei / Ondřej Hotárek	(Russia) Aleksandra Boikova / Dmitrii Kozlovskii	(Germany) Minerva Fabienne Hase / Nolan Seegert	Details
(Estonia) Tallinn Trophy	(Australia) Ekaterina Alexandrovskaya / Harley Windsor	(Russia) Alisa Efimova / Alexander Korovin	(Russia) Anastasia Poluianova / Dmitry Sopot	Details
(Croatia) Golden Spin of Zagreb	(Russia) Natalia Zabiiako / Alexander Enbert	(Russia) Kristina Astakhova / Alexei Rogonov	(United States) Tarah Kayne / Danny O'Shea	Details

Other international competitions
Competition	Gold	Silver	Bronze	Results
(Hong Kong) Asian Open Trophy	(South Korea) Kim Su-yeon / Kim Hyung-tae	(Japan) Miu Suzaki / Ryuichi Kihara	(Japan) Narumi Takahashi / Ryo Shibata	Details
(France) Cup of Nice	(China) Yu Xiaoyu / Zhang Hao	(Germany) Annika Hocke / Ruben Blommaert	(South Korea) Kim Kyu-eun / Alex Kam	Details
(Latvia) Volvo Open Cup	(United Kingdom) Zoe Jones / Christopher Boyadji	(Azerbaijan) Sofiya Karagodina / Semen Stepanov	(Switzerland) Ioulia Chtchetinina / Mikhail Akulov	Details
(Austria) Ice Challenge	(Germany) Lena Kreitmeier / Anton Kempf	No other competitors		Details
(China) Shanghai Trophy	(China) Sui Wenjing / Han Cong	(China) Peng Cheng / Jin Yang	(Italy) Valentina Marchei / Ondřej Hotárek	Details
(Poland) Mentor Toruń Cup	(Spain) Laura Barquero / Aritz Maestu	(Italy) Rebecca Ghilardi / Filippo Ambrosini	(Spain) Dorota Broda / Pedro Betegón	Details
(Netherlands) International Challenge Cup	(Spain) Laura Barquero / Aritz Maestu	(Switzerland) Ioulia Chtchetinina / Mikhail Akulov	(Italy) Rebecca Ghilardi / Filippo Ambrosini	Details
(Italy) Egna Spring Trophy	(Netherlands) Anastasiia Smirnova / Dimitry Epstein	No other competitors		Details

=== Ice dance ===
Olympics
Competition	Gold	Silver	Bronze	Results
(South Korea) Winter Olympics	(Canada) Tessa Virtue / Scott Moir	(France) Gabriella Papadakis / Guillaume Cizeron	(United States) Maia Shibutani / Alex Shibutani	Details

Championships
Competition	Gold	Silver	Bronze	Results
(Russia) European Championships	(France) Gabriella Papadakis / Guillaume Cizeron	(Russia) Ekaterina Bobrova / Dmitri Soloviev	(Russia) Alexandra Stepanova / Ivan Bukin	Details
(Taiwan) Four Continents Championships	(United States) Kaitlin Hawayek / Jean-Luc Baker	(Canada) Carolane Soucisse / Shane Firus	(Japan) Kana Muramoto / Chris Reed	Details
(Bulgaria) World Junior Championships	(Russia) Anastasia Skoptsova / Kirill Aleshin	(United States) Christina Carreira / Anthony Ponomarenko	(Russia) Arina Ushakova / Maxim Nekrasov	Details
(Italy) World Championships	(France) Gabriella Papadakis / Guillaume Cizeron	(United States) Madison Hubbell / Zachary Donohue	(Canada) Kaitlyn Weaver / Andrew Poje	Details

Grand Prix
Competition	Gold	Silver	Bronze	Results
(Russia) Rostelecom Cup	(United States) Maia Shibutani / Alex Shibutani	(Russia) Ekaterina Bobrova / Dmitri Soloviev	(Russia) Alexandra Stepanova / Ivan Bukin	Details
Skate Canada International	(Canada) Tessa Virtue / Scott Moir	(Canada) Kaitlyn Weaver / Andrew Poje	(United States) Madison Hubbell / Zachary Donohue	Details
Cup of China	(France) Gabriella Papadakis / Guillaume Cizeron	(United States) Madison Chock / Evan Bates	(Russia) Ekaterina Bobrova / Dmitri Soloviev	Details
(Japan) NHK Trophy	(Canada) Tessa Virtue / Scott Moir	(United States) Madison Hubbell / Zachary Donohue	(Italy) Anna Cappellini / Luca Lanotte	Details
Internationaux de France	(France) Gabriella Papadakis / Guillaume Cizeron	(United States) Madison Chock / Evan Bates	(Russia) Alexandra Stepanova / Ivan Bukin	Details
(United States) Skate America	(United States) Maia Shibutani / Alex Shibutani	(Italy) Anna Cappellini / Luca Lanotte	(Russia) Victoria Sinitsina / Nikita Katsalapov	Details
(Japan) Grand Prix Final	(France) Gabriella Papadakis / Guillaume Cizeron	(Canada) Tessa Virtue / Scott Moir	(United States) Maia Shibutani / Alex Shibutani	Details

Junior Grand Prix
Competition	Gold	Silver	Bronze	Results
JGP Australia	(Russia) Sofia Polishchuk / Alexander Vakhnov	(Canada) Marjorie Lajoie / Zachary Lagha	(Russia) Elizaveta Khudaiberdieva / Nikita Nazarov	Details
JGP Austria	(United States) Christina Carreira / Anthony Ponomarenko	(Russia) Ksenia Konkina / Grigory Yakushev	(France) Natacha Lagouge / Corentin Rahier	Details
JGP Latvia	(Russia) Sofia Shevchenko / Igor Eremenko	(Russia) Anastasia Shpilevaya / Grigory Smirnov	(United States) Caroline Green / Gordon Green	Details
JGP Belarus	(United States) Christina Carreira / Anthony Ponomarenko	(Russia) Anastasia Skoptsova / Kirill Aleshin	(Russia) Arina Ushakova / Maxim Nekrasov	Details
JGP Croatia	(Canada) Marjorie Lajoie / Zachary Lagha	(Russia) Sofia Shevchenko / Igor Eremenko	(Russia) Ksenia Konkina / Grigory Yakushev	Details
JGP Poland	(Russia) Anastasia Skoptsova / Kirill Aleshin	(Russia) Elizaveta Khudaiberdieva / Nikita Nazarov	(United States) Caroline Green / Gordon Green	Details
JGP Italy	(Russia) Arina Ushakova / Maxim Nekrasov	(Russia) Sofia Polishchuk / Alexander Vakhnov	(Canada) Alicia Fabbri / Claudio Pietrantonio	Details
(Japan) JGP Final	(Russia) Anastasia Skoptsova / Kirill Aleshin	(United States) Christina Carreira / Anthony Ponomarenko	(Russia) Sofia Polishchuk / Alexander Vakhnov	Details

Challenger Series
Competition	Gold	Silver	Bronze	Results
(United States) U.S. International Classic	(United States) Madison Hubbell / Zachary Donohue	(United States) Kaitlin Hawayek / Jean-Luc Baker	(Japan) Kana Muramoto / Chris Reed	Details
(Italy) Lombardia Trophy	(Italy) Charlène Guignard / Marco Fabbri	(Russia) Alla Loboda / Pavel Drozd	(Ukraine) Oleksandra Nazarova / Maxim Nikitin	Details
(Canada) Autumn Classic International	(Canada) Tessa Virtue / Scott Moir	(Canada) Kaitlyn Weaver / Andrew Poje	(Canada) Piper Gilles / Paul Poirier	Details
(Slovakia) Ondrej Nepela Trophy	(Russia) Ekaterina Bobrova / Dmitri Soloviev	(United States) Rachel Parsons / Michael Parsons	(Russia) Betina Popova / Sergey Mozgov	Details
(Germany) Nebelhorn Trophy	(United Kingdom) Penny Coomes / Nicholas Buckland	(Japan) Kana Muramoto / Chris Reed	(Germany) Kavita Lorenz / Joti Polizoakis	Details
(Finland) Finlandia Trophy	(France) Gabriella Papadakis / Guillaume Cizeron	(Russia) Alexandra Stepanova / Ivan Bukin	(Denmark) Laurence Fournier Beaudry / Nikolaj Sørensen	Details
(Belarus) Minsk-Arena Ice Star	(Italy) Anna Cappellini / Luca Lanotte	(Russia) Tiffany Zahorski / Jonathan Guerreiro	(Russia) Victoria Sinitsina / Nikita Katsalapov	Details
(Poland) Warsaw Cup	(Russia) Betina Popova / Sergey Mozgov	(United States) Lorraine McNamara / Quinn Carpenter	(Ukraine) Oleksandra Nazarova / Maxim Nikitin	Details
(Estonia) Tallinn Trophy	(Poland) Natalia Kaliszek / Maksym Spodyriev	(Turkey) Alisa Agafonova / Alper Uçar	(United States) Elliana Pogrebinsky / Alex Benoit	Details
(Croatia) Golden Spin of Zagreb	(Russia) Ekaterina Bobrova / Dmitri Soloviev	(Italy) Charlène Guignard / Marco Fabbri	(United States) Kaitlin Hawayek / Jean-Luc Baker	Details

Other international competitions
Competition	Gold	Silver	Bronze	Results
(United States) Lake Placid Ice Dance International	(United States) Lorraine McNamara / Quinn Carpenter	(United States) Rachel Parsons / Michael Parsons	(United States) Elliana Pogrebinsky / Alex Benoit	Details
(France) Cup of Nice	(United Kingdom) Penny Coomes / Nicholas Buckland	(China) Wang Shiyue / Liu Xinyu	(France) Marie-Jade Lauriault / Romain Legac	Details
(Latvia) Volvo Open Cup	(Germany) Katharina Müller / Tim Dieck	(Ukraine) Darya Popova / Volodymyr Byelikov	(Hungary) Anna Yanovskaya / Ádám Lukács	Details
(Austria) Ice Challenge	(Finland) Cecilia Törn / Jussiville Partanen	(United Kingdom) Lilah Fear / Lewis Gibson	(Finland) Juulia Turkkila / Matthias Versluis	Details
Open d'Andorra	(Spain) Sara Hurtado / Kirill Khaliavin	(United Kingdom) Lilah Fear / Lewis Gibson	(Germany) Shari Koch / Christian Nüchtern	Details
(China) Shanghai Trophy	(Russia) Ekaterina Bobrova / Dmitri Soloviev	(Italy) Charlène Guignard / Marco Fabbri	(France) Marie-Jade Lauriault / Romain Le Gac	Details
(Hungary) Santa Claus Cup	(Ukraine) Oleksandra Nazarova / Maxim Nikitin	(Hungary) Anna Yanovskaya / Ádám Lukács	(Poland) Natalia Kaliszek / Maksym Spodyriev	Details
(Turkey) Istanbul Bosphorous Cup	(Turkey) Alisa Agafonova / Alper Uçar	(Russia) Sofia Evdokimova / Egor Bazin	(Bulgaria) Teodora Markova / Simon Daze	Details
(Germany) Bavarian Open	(United Kingdom) Lilah Fear / Lewis Gibson	(Italy) Jasmine Tessari / Francesco Fioretti	(Germany) Shari Koch / Christian Nüchtern	Details
(Poland) Mentor Toruń Cup	(Poland) Natalia Kaliszek / Maksym Spodyriev	(United Kingdom) Lilah Fear / Lewis Gibson	(Hungary) Anna Yanovskaya / Ádám Lukács	Details
(Italy) Egna Dance Trophy	(Finland) Cecilia Torn / Jussiville Partanen	(Italy) Jasmine Tessari / Francesco Fioretti	(Russia) Sofia Evdokimova / Egor Bazin	Details

== Season's best scores ==
=== Men's singles ===
Top 10 season's best scores in the men's combined total
No.	Skater	Nation	Score	Event
1	Nathan Chen	United States	321.40	2018 World Championships
2	Shoma Uno	Japan	319.84	2017 Lombardia Trophy
3	Yuzuru Hanyu	Japan	317.85	2018 Winter Olympics
4	Javier Fernández	Spain	305.24	2018 Winter Olympics
5	Jin Boyang	China	300.95	2018 Four Continents Championships
6	Mikhail Kolyada	Russia	282.00	2017–18 Grand Prix Final
7	Vincent Zhou	United States	276.69	2018 Winter Olympics
8	Dmitri Aliev	Russia	274.06	2018 European Championships
9	Sergei Voronov	Russia	271.12	2017 NHK Trophy
10	Jason Brown	United States	269.22	2018 Four Continents Championships

Top 10 season's best scores in the men's short program
No.	Skater	Nation	Score	Event
1	Yuzuru Hanyu	Japan	112.72	2017 Autumn Classic International
2	Javier Fernández	Spain	107.86	2017 Internationaux de France
3	Shoma Uno	Japan	104.87	2017 Lombardia Trophy
4	Nathan Chen	United States	104.12	2017 Skate America
5	Jin Boyang	China	103.32	2018 Winter Olympics
6	Mikhail Kolyada	Russia	103.13	2017 Cup of China
7	Dmitri Aliev	Russia	98.98	2018 Winter Olympics
8	Vincent Zhou	United States	96.78	2018 World Championships
9	Patrick Chan	Canada	94.43	2017 Skate Canada International
10	Keegan Messing	Canada	93.00	2018 World Championships

Top 10 season's best scores in the men's free skating
No.	Skater	Nation	Score	Event
1	Nathan Chen	United States	219.46	2018 World Championships
2	Shoma Uno	Japan	214.97	2017 Lombardia Trophy
3	Yuzuru Hanyu	Japan	206.17	2018 Winter Olympics
4	Jin Boyang	China	200.78	2018 Four Continents Championships
5	Javier Fernández	Spain	197.66	2018 Winter Olympics
6	Vincent Zhou	United States	192.16	2018 Winter Olympics
7	Mikhail Kolyada	Russia	185.27	2017 Rostelecom Cup
8	Dmitri Aliev	Russia	182.73	2018 European Championships
9	Sergei Voronov	Russia	181.06	2017 NHK Trophy
10	Patrick Chan	Canada	179.75	2018 Winter Olympics (Team event)

=== Ladies' singles ===
Top 10 season's best scores in the ladies' combined total
No.	Skater	Nation	Score	Event
1	Alina Zagitova	Russia	239.57	2018 Winter Olympics
2	Evgenia Medvedeva	Russia	238.26	2018 Winter Olympics
3	Kaetlyn Osmond	Canada	231.02	2018 Winter Olympics
4	Alexandra Trusova	Russia	225.52	2018 World Junior Championships
5	Satoko Miyahara	Japan	222.38	2018 Winter Olympics
6	Wakaba Higuchi	Japan	217.63	2017 Lombardia Trophy
7	Maria Sotskova	Russia	216.28	2017–18 Grand Prix Final
8	Carolina Kostner	Italy	215.98	2017 Rostelecom Cup
9	Kaori Sakamoto	Japan	214.21	2018 Four Continents Championships
10	Mai Mihara	Japan	210.57	2018 Four Continents Championships

Top 10 season's best scores in the ladies' short program
No.	Skater	Nation	Score	Event
1	Alina Zagitova	Russia	82.92	2018 Winter Olympics
2	Evgenia Medvedeva	Russia	81.61	2018 Winter Olympics
3	Carolina Kostner	Italy	80.27	2018 World Championships
4	Kaetlyn Osmond	Canada	78.87	2018 Winter Olympics
5	Satoko Miyahara	Japan	75.94	2018 Winter Olympics
6	Wakaba Higuchi	Japan	74.26	2017 Lombardia Trophy
7	Maria Sotskova	Russia	74.00	2017–18 Grand Prix Final
8	Alexandra Trusova	Russia	73.25	2017–18 JGP Final
9	Kaori Sakamoto	Japan	73.18	2018 Winter Olympics
10	Alena Kostornaia	Russia	71.65	2017–18 JGP Final

Top 10 season's best scores in the ladies' free skating
No.	Skater	Nation	Score	Event
1	Alina Zagitova	Russia	158.08	2018 Winter Olympics (Team event)
2	Evgenia Medvedeva	Russia	156.65	2018 Winter Olympics
3	Alexandra Trusova	Russia	153.49	2018 World Junior Championships
4	Kaetlyn Osmond	Canada	152.15	2018 Winter Olympics
5	Satoko Miyahara	Japan	146.44	2018 Winter Olympics
6	Wakaba Higuchi	Japan	145.01	2018 World Championships
7	Kaori Sakamoto	Japan	142.87	2018 Four Continents Championships
8	Maria Sotskova	Russia	142.28	2017–18 Grand Prix Final
9	Carolina Kostner	Italy	141.83	2017–18 Grand Prix Final
10	Mai Mihara	Japan	140.73	2018 Four Continents Championships

=== Pairs ===
Top 10 season's best scores in the pairs' combined total
No.	Team	Nation	Score	Event
1	Aljona Savchenko / Bruno Massot	Germany	245.84	2018 World Championships
2	Sui Wenjing / Han Cong	China	235.47	2018 Winter Olympics
3	Meagan Duhamel / Eric Radford	Canada	230.15	2018 Winter Olympics
4	Evgenia Tarasova / Vladimir Morozov	Russia	225.53	2018 World Championships
5	Ksenia Stolbova / Fedor Klimov	Russia	222.74	2017 NHK Trophy
6	Yu Xiaoyu / Zhang Hao	China	219.20	2017 Skate America
7	Vanessa James / Morgan Ciprès	France	218.53	2018 Winter Olympics
8	Valentina Marchei / Ondřej Hotárek	Italy	216.59	2018 Winter Olympics
9	Natalia Zabiiako / Alexander Enbert	Russia	212.88	2018 Winter Olympics
10	Nicole Della Monica / Matteo Guarise	Italy	206.06	2018 World Championships

Top 10 season's best scores in the pairs' short program
No.	Team	Nation	Score	Event
1	Aljona Savchenko / Bruno Massot	Germany	82.98	2018 World Championships
2	Sui Wenjing / Han Cong	China	82.39	2018 Winter Olympics
3	Evgenia Tarasova / Vladimir Morozov	Russia	81.68	2018 Winter Olympics
4	Meagan Duhamel / Eric Radford	Canada	77.14	2017 Autumn Classic International
5	Yu Xiaoyu / Zhang Hao	China	75.58	2018 Winter Olympics
6	Vanessa James / Morgan Ciprès	France	75.52	2018 European Championships
7	Ksenia Stolbova / Fedor Klimov	Russia	75.05	2017 NHK Trophy
8	Valentina Marchei / Ondřej Hotárek	Italy	74.50	2018 Winter Olympics
9	Natalia Zabiiako / Alexander Enbert	Russia	74.38	2018 World Championships
10	Nicole Della Monica / Matteo Guarise	Italy	74.00	2018 Winter Olympics

Top 10 season's best scores in the pairs' free skating
No.	Team	Nation	Score	Event
1	Aljona Savchenko / Bruno Massot	Germany	162.86	2018 World Championships
2	Sui Wenjing / Han Cong	China	155.10	2017 NHK Trophy
3	Meagan Duhamel / Eric Radford	Canada	153.33	2018 Winter Olympics
4	Evgenia Tarasova / Vladimir Morozov	Russia	151.23	2018 European Championships
5	Ksenia Stolbova / Fedor Klimov	Russia	147.69	2017 NHK Trophy
6	Yu Xiaoyu / Zhang Hao	China	145.53	2017 Skate America
7	Vanessa James / Morgan Ciprès	France	143.19	2018 Winter Olympics
8	Valentina Marchei / Ondřej Hotárek	Italy	142.09	2018 Winter Olympics
9	Natalia Zabiiako / Alexander Enbert	Russia	138.53	2018 Winter Olympics
10	Julianne Séguin / Charlie Bilodeau	Canada	136.50	2018 Winter Olympics

=== Ice dance ===
Top 10 season's best scores in the combined total (ice dance)
No.	Team	Nation	Score	Event
1	Gabriella Papadakis / Guillaume Cizeron	France	207.20	2018 World Championships
2	Tessa Virtue / Scott Moir	Canada	206.07	2018 Winter Olympics
3	Madison Hubbell / Zachary Donohue	United States	196.64	2018 World Championships
4	Maia Shibutani / Alex Shibutani	United States	194.25	2017 Skate America
5	Kaitlyn Weaver / Andrew Poje	Canada	192.35	2018 World Championships
6	Anna Cappellini / Luca Lanotte	Italy	192.08	2018 World Championships
7	Madison Chock / Evan Bates	United States	187.28	2018 World Championships
8	Ekaterina Bobrova / Dmitri Soloviev	Russia	187.13	2018 European Championships
9	Piper Gilles / Paul Poirier	Canada	186.10	2018 World Championships
10	Alexandra Stepanova / Ivan Bukin	Russia	184.86	2018 European Championships

Top 10 season's best scores in the short dance
No.	Team	Nation	Score	Event
1	Gabriella Papadakis / Guillaume Cizeron	France	83.73	2018 World Championships
2	Tessa Virtue / Scott Moir	Canada	83.67	2018 Winter Olympics
3	Madison Hubbell / Zachary Donohue	United States	80.42	2018 World Championships
4	Maia Shibutani / Alex Shibutani	United States	79.18	2017 Skate America
5	Kaitlyn Weaver / Andrew Poje	Canada	78.31	2018 World Championships
6	Anna Cappellini / Luca Lanotte	Italy	77.46	2018 World Championships
7	Ekaterina Bobrova / Dmitri Soloviev	Russia	76.33	2017 Rostelecom Cup
8	Madison Chock / Evan Bates	United States	75.66	2018 World Championships
9	Alexandra Stepanova / Ivan Bukin	Russia	75.38	2018 European Championships
10	Piper Gilles / Paul Poirier	Canada	74.51	2018 World Championships

Top 10 season's best scores in the free dance
No.	Team	Nation	Score	Event
1	Gabriella Papadakis / Guillaume Cizeron	France	123.47	2018 World Championships
2	Tessa Virtue / Scott Moir	Canada	122.40	2018 Winter Olympics
3	Madison Hubbell / Zachary Donohue	United States	116.22	2018 World Championships
4	Maia Shibutani / Alex Shibutani	United States	115.07	2017 Skate America
5	Anna Cappellini / Luca Lanotte	Italy	114.62	2018 World Championships
6	Kaitlyn Weaver / Andrew Poje	Canada	114.04	2018 World Championships
7	Madison Chock / Evan Bates	United States	112.79	2017–18 Grand Prix Final
8	Ekaterina Bobrova / Dmitri Soloviev	Russia	112.70	2018 European Championships
9	Piper Gilles / Paul Poirier	Canada	111.59	2018 World Championships
10	Alexandra Stepanova / Ivan Bukin	Russia	109.51	2018 World Championships

== World standings ==
=== Men's singles ===
As of March 24, 2018

No.	Skater	Nation
1	Yuzuru Hanyu	Japan
2	Shoma Uno	Japan
3	Nathan Chen	United States
4	Mikhail Kolyada	Russia
5	Javier Fernández	Spain
6	Jason Brown	United States
7	Alexei Bychenko	Israel
8	Jin Boyang	China
9	Adam Rippon	United States
10	Patrick Chan	Canada

=== Ladies' singles ===
As of March 23, 2018

No.	Skater	Nation
1	Kaetlyn Osmond	Canada
2	Evgenia Medvedeva	Russia
3	Satoko Miyahara	Japan
4	Maria Sotskova	Russia
5	Alina Zagitova	Russia
6	Wakaba Higuchi	Japan
7	Mai Mihara	Japan
8	Carolina Kostner	Italy
9	Anna Pogorilaya	Russia
10	Gabrielle Daleman	Canada

=== Pairs ===
As of March 22, 2018

No.	Team	Nation
1	Aljona Savchenko / Bruno Massot	Germany
2	Evgenia Tarasova / Vladimir Morozov	Russia
3	Meagan Duhamel / Eric Radford	Canada
4	Natalya Zabiyako / Alexander Enbert	Russia
5	Sui Wenjing / Han Cong	China
6	Vanessa James / Morgan Ciprès	France
7	Ksenia Stolbova / Fedor Klimov	Russia
8	Yu Xiaoyu / Zhang Hao	China
9	Nicole Della Monica / Matteo Guarise	Italy
10	Valentina Marchei / Ondřej Hotárek	Italy

=== Ice dance ===
As of March 24, 2018

No.	Team	Nation
1	Tessa Virtue / Scott Moir	Canada
2	Gabriella Papadakis / Guillaume Cizeron	France
3	Madison Hubbell / Zachary Donohue	United States
4	Ekaterina Bobrova / Dmitri Soloviev	Russia
5	Anna Cappellini / Luca Lanotte	Italy
6	Maia Shibutani / Alex Shibutani	United States
7	Madison Chock / Evan Bates	United States
8	Kaitlyn Weaver / Andrew Poje	Canada
9	Charlène Guignard / Marco Fabbri	Italy
10	Piper Gilles / Paul Poirier	Canada

== Current season's world rankings ==
=== Men's singles ===
As of March 24, 2018

No.	Skater	Nation
1	Nathan Chen	United States
2	Mikhail Kolyada	Russia
3	Shoma Uno	Japan
4	Alexei Bychenko	Israel
5	Javier Fernández	Spain
6	Yuzuru Hanyu	Japan
7	Jin Boyang	China
8	Jason Brown	United States
9	Deniss Vasiļjevs	Latvia
10	Adam Rippon	United States

=== Ladies' singles ===
As of March 23, 2018

No.	Skater	Nation
1	Alina Zagitova	Russia
2	Kaetlyn Osmond	Canada
3	Wakaba Higuchi	Japan
4	Carolina Kostner	Italy
5	Evgenia Medvedeva	Russia
6	Maria Sotskova	Russia
7	Kaori Sakamoto	Japan
8	Satoko Miyahara	Japan
9	Mai Mihara	Japan
10	Bradie Tennell	United States

=== Pairs ===
As of March 22, 2018

No.	Team	Nation
1	Aljona Savchenko / Bruno Massot	Germany
2	Evgenia Tarasova / Vladimir Morozov	Russia
3	Meagan Duhamel / Eric Radford	Canada
4	Sui Wenjing / Han Cong	China
5	Natalya Zabiyako / Alexander Enbert	Russia
6	Vanessa James / Morgan Ciprès	France
7	Nicole Della Monica / Matteo Guarise	Italy
8	Ksenia Stolbova / Fedor Klimov	Russia
9	Valentina Marchei / Ondřej Hotárek	Italy
10	Kristina Astakhova / Alexei Rogonov	Russia

=== Ice dance ===
As of March 24, 2018

No.	Team	Nation
1	Gabriella Papadakis / Guillaume Cizeron	France
2	Tessa Virtue / Scott Moir	Canada
3	Madison Hubbell / Zachary Donohue	United States
4	Ekaterina Bobrova / Dmitri Soloviev	Russia
5	Maia Shibutani / Alex Shibutani	United States
6	Anna Cappellini / Luca Lanotte	Italy
7	Kaitlin Hawayek / Jean-Luc Baker	United States
8	Kaitlyn Weaver / Andrew Poje	Canada
9	Madison Chock / Evan Bates	United States
10	Charlène Guignard / Marco Fabbri	Italy
