= Alexander Vakhnov =

Russian ice dancer (born 1999)

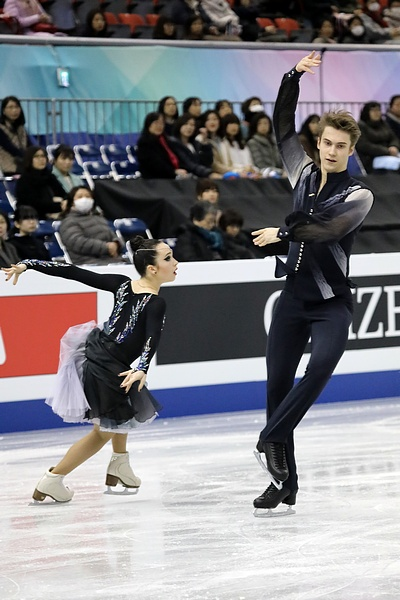
- Vakhnov in December 2017

Personal information
- Native name: Александр Евгеньевич Вахнов
- Full name: Alexander Evgenievich Vakhnov
- Born: 16 February 1999 (age 27) Kirov, Kirov Oblast, Russia
- Height: 1.85 m (6 ft 1 in)

Figure skating career
- Country: Russia
- Partner: Daria Savkina
- Coach: Svetlana Liapina
- Skating club: Sport School No. 85 Moscow
- Began skating: 2003
Medal record
Representing Russia
Figure skating: Ice dancing
Junior Grand Prix Final
Bronze medal – third place	2017–18 Nagoya	Ice dancing

Alexander Evgenievich Vakhnov (Russian: Александр Евгеньевич Вахнов, born 16 February 1999) is a Russian competitive ice dancer. With his former skating partner, Sofia Polishchuk, he is the 2017 Junior Grand Prix Final bronze medalist and 2017 JGP Australia champion.

== Personal life ==
Alexander Evgenievich Vakhnov was born on 16 February 1999 in Kirov, Kirov Oblast, Russia.

== Career ==
=== Early career ===
Vakhnov began learning to skate in 2003. He teamed up with Sofia Polishchuk ahead of the 2009–2010 season.

Polishchuk/Vakhnov started competing internationally in the 2010–2011 season, winning the basic novice category at the 2010 NRW Trophy. They made their international junior-level debut during the 2014–2015 season; they won bronze at the 2014 Ice Star and 2014 NRW Trophy.

=== 2015–2016 season ===
Polishchuk/Vakhnov received their first ISU Junior Grand Prix (JGP) assignments in the 2015–2016 season. After winning a bronze medal in early September at the JGP in Colorado Springs, United States, they finished fifth three weeks later in Toruń, Poland.

They placed sixth at the 2016 Russian Junior Championships.

=== 2016–2017 season ===
Competing in the 2016 JGP series, Polishchuk/Vakhnov won bronze in August in Saint-Gervais-les-Bains, France, and then silver in September in Ljubljana, Slovenia. They placed fourth at the 2017 Russian Junior Championships.

=== 2017–2018 season ===
Competing in their ninth season together, Polishchuk/Vakhnov won gold in August at the 2017 JGP event in Brisbane, Australia. They beat the silver medalists, Marjorie Lajoie / Zachary Lagha, by seven points. In October, they won the silver medal at the 2017 JGP event in Egna, Italy. Polishchuk/Vakhnov were beaten by their teammates Arina Ushakova / Maxim Nekrasov by about two points. With these results Polishchuk/Vakhnov qualified for the 2017–18 ISU Junior Grand Prix Final, where they won the bronze medal after placing third in both segments.

In January 2018, Polishchuk/Vakhnov finished fourth at the 2018 Russian Junior Championships after placing fourth in both segments. They were coached by Svetlana Liapina in Moscow. Their partnership ended by spring 2018.

=== 2018–2019 season ===
Vakhnov teamed up with Ksenia Konkina in spring 2018. Coached by Liapina in Moscow, the two won bronze in their international debut, at the 2018 JGP event in Vancouver, Canada. They did not receive a second JGP assignment and therefore could not qualify for the 2018–19 Junior Grand Prix Final. Their partnership ended by November 2018.

=== 2019–2020 season ===
Vakhnov teamed up with Svetlana Lizunova prior to the season. They placed eighth at 2019 JGP Croatia.

=== 2020-2021 season ===
Lizunova/Vakhnov placed seventh at the 2021 Russian Nationals.

=== 2021-2022 ===
They did not compete this season, and in January, Vakhnov was seen on Ice Partner Search, indicating the two had split. Liuznova later announced her retirement.

=== 2022-2023 season ===
In May, it was announced that Vakhnov had teamed up with American Isabella Flores, presumably for the United States.

== Programs ==
=== With Lizunova ===
Season	Rhythm dance	Free dance
2019–2020	Foxtrot: Dirty Dancing; Swing: Dirty Dancing	Mozart, l'opéra rock by Dove Attia

=== With Konkina ===
Season	Rhythm dance	Free dance
2018–2019	Tango: Asi se baila el Tango performed by Veronica Verdier; Tango: Tanguera performed by Sexteto Mayor	Spartacus by Aram Khachaturian

=== With Polishchuk ===
Season	Short dance	Free dance
2017–2018	Cha Cha: Chilly Cha Cha by Jessica Jay; Samba: Hip Hip Chin Chin by Club des Belugas	Black Swan by Clint Mansell
2016–2017	Blues: Your Heart Is As Black As Night by Melody Gardot; Swing: That Man by Caro Emerald	Romeo & Juliet by Abel Korzeniowski
2015–2016	Foxtrot: Les feuilles mortes by Yves Montand; Waltz: J'envoie valser by Zazie	Sabre Dance performed by Vanessa-Mae; Ascolat La Voce by Lara Fabian
2014–2015	Silver Samba: Set Fire to the Rain by Adele	One Day from Pirates of the Caribbean: At World's End by Hans Zimmer
2013–2014	Quickstep: Chicago by John Kander	Esperanza by Maxime Rodriguez

== Competitive highlights ==
JGP: Junior Grand Prix

=== With Savkina ===
National
Event	2023–24	2024–25
Russian Champ.	12th	14th
Russian Cup Final	8th	

=== With Lizunova ===
International: Junior
Event	19–20	20–21
JGP Croatia	8th	
National
Russian Champ.		7th

=== With Konkina ===
International: Junior
Event	18–19
JGP Canada	3rd

=== With Polishchuk ===
International: Junior
Event	13–14	14–15	15–16	16–17	17–18
JGP Final					3rd
JGP Australia					1st
JGP France				3rd	
JGP Italy					2nd
JGP Poland			5h		
JGP Slovenia				2nd	
JGP United States			3rd		
Ice Star		3rd			
NRW Trophy		3rd			
Open d'Andorra			1st	1st	1st
National
Russian Jr. Champ.	9th	10th	6th	4th	4th

== Detailed results ==
=== With Lizunova ===
2019–2020 season
Date	Event	Level	RD	FD	Total
25–28 September 2019	2019 JGP Croatia	Junior	7; 57.05	10; 84.34	8; 141.39

=== With Konkina ===
2018–2019 season
Date	Event	Level	RD	FD	Total
12–15 September 2018	2018 JGP Canada	Junior	2; 60.34	3; 87.58	3; 147.92

=== With Polishchuk ===
2017–2018 season
Date	Event	Level	SD	FD	Total
23–26 January 2018	2018 Russian Junior Championships	Junior	4; 63.38	4; 89.44	4; 152.82
7–10 December 2017	2017–18 JGP Final	Junior	3; 63.17	3; 85.87	3; 149.04
22–26 November 2017	2017 Open d'Andorra	Junior	1; 61.16	1; 89.97	1; 151.13
11–14 October 2017	2017 JGP Italy	Junior	1; 61.44	2; 85.34	2; 146.78
23–26 August 2017	2017 JGP Australia	Junior	1; 61.08	1; 84.78	1; 145.86
2016–2017 season
Date	Event	Level	SD	FD	Total
1–5 February 2017	2017 Russian Junior Championships	Junior	4; 61.31	3; 88.73	4; 150.04
16–20 November 2016	2016 Open d'Andorra	Junior	1; 65.40	1; 92.00	1; 157.40
21–25 September 2016	2016 JGP Slovenia	Junior	3; 55.60	1; 89.16	2; 144.76
24–28 August 2016	2016 JGP France	Junior	5; 54.42	3; 83.35	3; 137.77
2015–2016 season
Date	Event	Level	SD	FD	Total
19–23 January 2016	2016 Russian Junior Championships	Junior	3; 62.05	6; 80.74	6; 142.79
19–22 November 2015	2015 Open d'Andorra	Junior	1; 57.47	1; 80.80	1; 138.27
23–27 September 2015	2015 JGP Poland	Junior	4; 57.65	5; 81.58	5; 139.23
2–6 September 2015	2015 JGP Usa	Junior	4; 53.28	3; 76.55	3; 129.83
2014–2015 season
Date	Event	Level	SD	FD	Total
7–9 November 2014	2014 NRW Trophy	Junior	4; 45.13	2; 72.84	3; 117.97
17–19 October 2014	2014 Ice Star	Junior	4; 43.27	1; 70.27	3; 113.54
