= Sofia Polishchuk =

Russian ice dancer

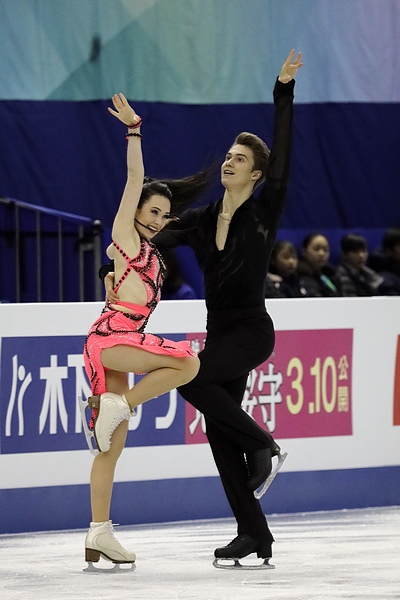
- Polishchuk with Vakhnov in December 2017

Personal information
- Native name: Софья Антоновна Полищук
- Full name: Sofia Antonovna Polishchuk
- Born: 21 February 2001 (age 25) Moscow, Russia
- Height: 1.67 m (5 ft 5 1/2 in)

Figure skating career
- Country: Russia
- Skating club: Sport School No. 85 Moscow
- Began skating: 2005
Medal record
Representing Russia
Figure skating: Ice dancing
Junior Grand Prix Final
| Bronze medal – third place | 2017–18 Nagoya | Ice dancing |

Sofia Antonovna Polishchuk (Russian: Софья Антоновна Полищук; born 21 February 2001) is a Russian competitive ice dancer. With her former skating partner, Alexander Vakhnov, she is the 2017 Junior Grand Prix Final bronze medalist and 2017 JGP Australia champion.

== Personal life ==
Sofia Antonovna Polishchuk was born on 21 February 2001 in Moscow, Russia.

== Career ==
=== Early career ===
Polishchuk began learning to skate in 2005. She teamed up with Alexander Vakhnov ahead of the 2009–2010 season.

Polishchuk/Vakhnov started competing internationally in the 2010–2011 season, winning the basic novice category at the 2010 NRW Trophy. They made their international junior-level debut during the 2014–2015 season; they won bronze at the 2014 Ice Star and 2014 NRW Trophy.

=== 2015–2016 season ===
Polishchuk/Vakhnov received their first ISU Junior Grand Prix (JGP) assignments in the 2015–2016 season. After winning a bronze medal in early September at the JGP in Colorado Springs, United States, they finished fifth three weeks later in Toruń, Poland.

They placed sixth at the 2016 Russian Junior Championships.

=== 2016–2017 season ===
Competing in the 2016 JGP series, Polishchuk/Vakhnov won bronze in August in Saint-Gervais-les-Bains, France, and then silver in September in Ljubljana, Slovenia. They placed fourth at the 2017 Russian Junior Championships.

=== 2017–2018 season ===
Competing in their ninth season together, Polishchuk/Vakhnov won gold in August at the 2017 JGP event in Brisbane, Australia. They beat the silver medalists, Marjorie Lajoie / Zachary Lagha, by seven points. In October, they won the silver medal at the 2017 JGP event in Egna, Italy. Polishchuk/Vakhnov were beaten by their teammates Arina Ushakova / Maxim Nekrasov by about two points. With these results Polishchuk/Vakhnov qualified for the 2017–2018 ISU Junior Grand Prix Final, where they won the bronze medal after placing third in both segments.

In January 2018, Polishchuk/Vakhnov finished fourth at the 2018 Russian Junior Championships after placing fourth in both segments. They were coached by Svetlana Liapina in Moscow. Their partnership ended by spring 2018.

=== 2018–2019 season ===
Polishchuk teamed up with German Shamraev.

In November Polishchuk/Shamraev made their international debut at the 2018 Volvo Open Cup where they finished 5th. In January 2019 they placed 7th at the 2019 Toruń Cup. In July 2019, Polishchuk's bio appeared on IcePartnerSearch, indicating that she and Shamraev had split, and she did not participate in the 2019-20 season.

== Programs ==
=== With Vakhnov ===
| Season | Short dance | Free dance |
|---|---|---|
| 2017–2018 | Cha Cha: Chilly Cha Cha by Jessica Jay; Samba: Hip Hip Chin Chin by Club des Belugas | Black Swan by Clint Mansell |
| 2016–2017 | Blues: Your Heart Is As Black As Night by Melody Gardot; Swing: That Man by Caro Emerald | Romeo & Juliet by Abel Korzeniowski |
| 2015–2016 | Foxtrot: Les feuilles mortes by Yves Montand; Waltz: J'envoie valser by Zazie | Sabre Dance performed by Vanessa-Mae; Ascolat La Voce by Lara Fabian |
| 2014–2015 | Silver Samba: Set Fire to the Rain by Adele | One Day from Pirates of the Caribbean: At World's End by Hans Zimmer |
| 2013–2014 | Quickstep: Chicago by John Kander | Esperanza by Maxime Rodriguez |

== Competitive highlights ==
JGP: Junior Grand Prix

=== With Shamraev ===
International: Junior
| Event | 18–19 |
|---|---|
| Toruń Cup | 7th |
| Volvo Open Cup | 5th |
National
| Russian Jr. Champ. | |
J = Junior level; TBD = Assigned

=== With Vakhnov ===
International: Junior
| Event | 13–14 | 14–15 | 15–16 | 16–17 | 17–18 |
|---|---|---|---|---|---|
| JGP Final | | | | | 3rd |
| JGP Australia | | | | | 1st |
| JGP France | | | | 3rd | |
| JGP Italy | | | | | 2nd |
| JGP Poland | | | 5th | | |
| JGP Slovenia | | | | 2nd | |
| JGP United States | | | 3rd | | |
| Ice Star | | 3rd | | | |
| NRW Trophy | | 3rd | | | |
| Open d'Andorra | | | 1st | 1st | 1st |
National
| Russian Jr. Champ. | 9th | 10th | 6th | 4th | 4th |
Levels: B = Basic novice; N = Advanced novice

== Detailed results ==
=== With Shamraev ===
2018–2019 season
| Date | Event | Level | RD | FD | Total |
| 8–13 January 2019 | 2019 Toruń Cup | Junior | 5; 54.39 | 8; 79.64 | 7; 134.03 |
| 6–11 November 2018 | 2018 Volvo Open Cup | Junior | 4; 57.67 | 6; 83.81 | 5; 141.48 |

=== With Vakhnov ===
2017–2018 season
| Date | Event | Level | SD | FD | Total |
| 23–26 January 2018 | 2018 Russian Junior Championships | Junior | 4; 63.38 | 4; 89.44 | 4; 152.82 |
| 7–10 December 2017 | 2017–18 JGP Final | Junior | 3; 63.17 | 3; 85.87 | 3; 149.04 |
| 22–26 November 2017 | 2017 Open d'Andorra | Junior | 1; 61.16 | 1; 89.97 | 1; 151.13 |
| 11–14 October 2017 | 2017 JGP Italy | Junior | 1; 61.44 | 2; 85.34 | 2; 146.78 |
| 23–26 August 2017 | 2017 JGP Australia | Junior | 1; 61.08 | 1; 84.78 | 1; 145.86 |
2016–2017 season
| Date | Event | Level | SD | FD | Total |
| 1–5 February 2017 | 2017 Russian Junior Championships | Junior | 4; 61.31 | 3; 88.73 | 4; 150.04 |
| 16–20 November 2016 | 2016 Open d'Andorra | Junior | 1; 65.40 | 1; 92.00 | 1; 157.40 |
| 21–25 September 2016 | 2016 JGP Slovenia | Junior | 3; 55.60 | 1; 89.16 | 2; 144.76 |
| 24–28 August 2016 | 2016 JGP France | Junior | 5; 54.42 | 3; 83.35 | 3; 137.77 |
2015–2016 season
| Date | Event | Level | SD | FD | Total |
| 19–23 January 2016 | 2016 Russian Junior Championships | Junior | 3; 62.05 | 6; 80.74 | 6; 142.79 |
| 19–22 November 2015 | 2015 Open d'Andorra | Junior | 1; 57.47 | 1; 80.80 | 1; 138.27 |
| 23–27 September 2015 | 2015 JGP Poland | Junior | 4; 57.65 | 5; 81.58 | 5; 139.23 |
| 2–6 September 2015 | 2015 JGP Usa | Junior | 4; 53.28 | 3; 76.55 | 3; 129.83 |
2014–2015 season
| Date | Event | Level | SD | FD | Total |
| 7–9 November 2014 | 2014 NRW Trophy | Junior | 4; 45.13 | 2; 72.84 | 3; 117.97 |
| 17–19 October 2014 | 2014 Ice Star | Junior | 4; 43.27 | 1; 70.27 | 3; 113.54 |
