= Open d'Andorra =

International figure skating competition

- Status: Inactive
- Genre: International competition
- Frequency: Annual
- Location: Canillo
- Country: Andorra
- Inaugurated: 2014
- Previous event: 2022 Open d'Andorra
- Organizer: Andorran Ice Sports Federation

The Open d'Andorra is an international figure skating competition held annually in Canillo, Andorra, usually in November. Medals may be awarded in men's singles, women's singles, and ice dance at the senior, junior, and novice levels.

== Senior results ==
=== Men ===
Year	Gold	Silver	Bronze	Details
2014	(Spain) Javier Raya	(Spain) Felipe Montoya	(Sweden) Trevor Bergqvist	
2015	(Spain) Javier Raya	(Spain) Felipe Montoya	(Finland) Viktor Zubik	
2017	(Spain) Felipe Montoya	(France) Joshua Rols	(South Africa) Mathew Ayne Samuels	
2018	(Spain) Héctor Alonso Serrano	No other competitors		
2019	(Austria) Luc Maierhofer	(Germany) Thomas Stoll	(Switzerland) Tomás Guarino	
2021	(Spain) Tomàs-Llorenç Guarino Sabaté	(Austria) Luc Maierhofer	(Spain) Pablo García	
2022	(Monaco) Davide Lewton Brain	(Israel) Lev Vinokur	(France) Corentin Spinar	

=== Women ===
Year	Gold	Silver	Bronze	Details
2014	(Italy) Sara Falotico	(Sweden) Elin Hallberg	(Spain) Sonia Lafuente	
2015	(Spain) Sonia Lafuente	(South Africa) Michaela du Toit	(Australia) Chantelle Kerry	
2016	(United Kingdom) Natasha McKay	(Spain) Valentina Matos	(South Africa) Michaela du Toit	
2017	(Netherlands) Kyarha Van Tiel	(Finland) Oona Ounasvuori	(Finland) Emilia Toikkanen	
2018	(Spain) Valentina Matos	(Spain) Laia Bertran Gracia	(Andorra) Tania Margarido Pereira	
2019	(Netherlands) Kyarha van Tiel	(Poland) Elżbieta Gabryszak	(Switzerland) Yasmine Kimiko Yamada	
2021	(Finland) Emmi Peltonen	(Norway) Linnea Sophie Kolstad Kilsand	(Norway) Frida Turiddotter Berge	
2022	(Norway) Mia Risa Gomez	(Spain) Marie Kolly	(Spain) Lucía Ruiz Manzano	

=== Ice dance ===
Year	Gold	Silver	Bronze	Details
2014	(Spain) Celia Robledo / Luis Fenero	(France) Marie-Jade Lauriault / Romain Le Gac	No other competitors	
2015	(Germany) Kavita Lorenz / Panagiotis Polizoakis	(Poland) Natalia Kaliszek / Maksym Spodyriev	(Finland) Olesia Karmi / Max Lindholm	
2016	(Spain) Olivia Smart / Adrià Díaz	(Germany) Katharina Müller / Tim Dieck	(Czech Republic) Cortney Mansour / Michal Češka	
2017	(Spain) Sara Hurtado / Kirill Khaliavin	(United Kingdom) Lilah Fear / Lewis Gibson	(Germany) Shari Koch / Christian Nüchtern	
2018	(Italy) Jasmine Tessari / Francesco Fioretti	(Belarus) Anna Kublikova / Yuri Hulitski	(Italy) Chiara Calderone / Pietro Papetti	
2019	(Germany) Katharina Müller / Tim Dieck	(Czech Republic) Natálie Taschlerová / Filip Taschler	(France) Natacha Lagouge / Arnaud Caffa	
2021	(United Kingdom) Lilah Fear / Lewis Gibson	(Germany) Katharina Müller / Tim Dieck	(France) Loïcia Demougeot / Théo Le Mercier	
2022	(Italy) Leia Dozzi / Pietro Papetti	(Australia) India Nette / Eron Westwood	No other competitors	

== Junior results ==
=== Men ===
Year	Gold	Silver	Bronze	Details
2014	(Italy) Adrien Bannister	(Spain) Aleix Gabara Xancó	(Spain) Ton Consul Vivar	
2015	(Spain) Héctor Alonso Serrano	(Spain) Aleix Gabara Xancó	(Spain) Ton Consul Vivar	
2016	(France) Adam Siao Him Fa	(Canada) Zachary Daleman	(France) Joshua Rols	
2017	(Spain) Aleix Gabara Xancó	(France) Xan Rols	(Spain) Iker Oyarzabal Albas	
2018	(Spain) Aleix Gabara Xancó	(Spain) Pablo García	(Spain) Gaizka Madejón Cambra	
2019	(Spain) Pablo García	(Spain) Arnau Joly Atanasio	(France) Theo Belle	
2021	(Italy) Matteo Nalbone	(Spain) Euken Alberdi	(Spain) Christian Vaquero Toro	
2022	(Israel) Tamir Kuperman	(Sweden) Casper Johansson	(France) Ilia Gogitidze	

=== Women ===
Year	Gold	Silver	Bronze	Details
2014	(Italy) Rebecca Ghilardi	(Spain) Maeva Gallarda Rossell	(Netherlands) Kyarha van Tiel	
2015	(Finland) Sofia Korsumaki	(Spain) Maeva Gallarda Rossell	(Andorra) Tania Margarido	
2016	(Austria) Alisa Stomakhina	(United Kingdom) Anastasia Vaipan-Law	(Kazakhstan) Alana Toktarova	
2017	(Finland) Jade Rautiainen	(Sweden) Ylva Roll	(Spain) Claudia Justo De Andrès	
2018	(Spain) Marian Millares	(Georgia (country)) Anna Dea Gulbiani-Schmidt	(Spain) Belén Álvarez	
2019	(France) Sophie Sprung	(Spain) Marian Millares	(Germany) Janne Salatzki	
2021	(France) Clemence Mayindu	(Spain) Celia Vandhana Garnacho	(Spain) Júlia Rodríguez	
2022	(Sweden) Miranda Lundgren	(Estonia) Sandra-Liisa Jermonok	(Spain) Nuria Rodríguez Serrano	

=== Ice dance ===
Year	Gold	Silver	Bronze	Details
2014	(Italy) Sara Ghislandi / Giona Terzo Ortenzi	(United Kingdom) Ekaterina Fedyushchenko / Lucas Kitteridge	(Hungary) Hanna Jakucs / Dániel Illés	
2015	(Russia) Sofia Polishchuk / Alexander Vakhnov	(France) Adelina Galyavieva / Laurent Abecassis	(United Kingdom) Sasha Fear / Jack Osman	
2016	(Russia) Sofia Polishchuk / Alexander Vakhnov	(Russia) Daria Rumiantseva / Dmitri Riabchenko	(Germany) Ria Schwendinger / Valentin Wunderlich	
2017	(Russia) Sofia Polishchuk / Alexander Vakhnov	(Germany) Ria Schwendinger / Valentin Wunderlich	(Hungary) Villö Marton / Danyil Semko	
2018	(Russia) Polina Pankova / Anton Spiridonov	(Italy) Sara Campanini / Francesco Riva	(Czech Republic) Natalie Taschlerova / Filip Taschler	
2019	(Cyprus) Angelina Kudryavtseva / Ilia Karankevich	(Russia) Vasilisa Kaganovskaia / Valeri Angelopol	(Hungary) Villö Marton / Danyil Semko	
2021	(Ukraine) Mariia Pinchuk / Mykyta Pogorielov	(France) Célina Fradji / Jean-Hans Fourneaux	(Estonia) Tatjana Bunina / Ivan Kuznetsov	
2022	(Italy) Noemi Tali / Stefano Frasca	(France) Célina Fradji / Jean-Hans Fourneaux	(France) Louise Bordet / Thomas Gipoulou	
