= 2018 CS Autumn Classic International =

Figure skating competition

- Type: ISU Challenger Series
- Date: September 20 – 22
- Season: 2018–19
- Location: Oakville, Ontario, Canada
- Host: Skate Canada
- Venue: Sixteen Mile Sports Complex

Champions
- Men's singles: (Japan) Yuzuru Hanyu
- Ladies' singles: (United States) Bradie Tennell
- Pairs: (France) Vanessa James / Morgan Ciprès
- Ice dance: (Canada) Kaitlyn Weaver / Andrew Poje
- Previous: 2017 CS Autumn Classic International
- Next: 2019 CS Autumn Classic International
- Previous CS: 2018 CS Ondrej Nepela Trophy
- Next CS: 2018 CS Nebelhorn Trophy

The 2018 CS Autumn Classic International was held in September 2018 in Oakville, Ontario, Canada. It was part of the 2018–19 ISU Challenger Series. Medals were awarded in men's singles, ladies' singles, pair skating, and ice dance.

== Entries ==
The International Skating Union published the list of entries on August 30, 2018.

Country	Men	Ladies	Pairs	Ice dance
Australia	Andrew Dodds	Kailani Craine	—N/a	—N/a
Australia	Jordan Dodds	Brooklee Han	—N/a	—N/a
Bulgaria	—N/a		—N/a	Teodora Markova / Simon Daze
Canada	Kevin Reynolds	Alicia Pineault	Lori-Ann Matte / Thierry Ferland	Molly Lanaghan / Dmitre Razgulajevs
Canada	Roman Sadovsky	—N/a	Kirsten Moore-Towers / Michael Marinaro	Carolane Soucisse / Shane Firus
Canada	Bennet Toman	—N/a	—N/a	Kaitlyn Weaver / Andrew Poje
China	—N/a	—N/a	—N/a	Chen Hong / Sun Zhuoming
China	—N/a	—N/a	—N/a	Wang Shiyue / Liu Xinyu
Czech Republic	—N/a	Eliška Březinová	—N/a	—N/a
France	Kévin Aymoz	Maé-Bérénice Méité	Vanessa James / Morgan Ciprès	—N/a
Great Britain	Harry Mattick	—N/a	—N/a	—N/a
Hong Kong	Adonis Wai	—N/a	—N/a	—N/a
Hong Kong	Chung Wong	—N/a	—N/a	—N/a
Iceland	—N/a	Julia Gretarsdottir	—N/a	—N/a
Iceland	—N/a	Eva Dögg Sæmundsdóttir	—N/a	—N/a
Ireland	Samuel McAllister	—N/a	—N/a	—N/a
Ireland	Conor Stakelum	—N/a	—N/a	—N/a
Israel	Mark Gorodnitsky	Netta Schreiber	—N/a	—N/a
Japan	Yuzuru Hanyu	Wakaba Higuchi	—N/a	—N/a
Japan	—N/a	Yura Matsuda	—N/a	—N/a
Kazakhstan	—N/a	Anastassiya Khvan	—N/a	—N/a
Malaysia	Julian Zhi Jie Yee	—N/a	—N/a	—N/a
Mexico	Donovan Carrillo	Sofia Del Rio	—N/a	—N/a
Mexico	Diego Saldana	Andrea Montesinos Cantu	—N/a	—N/a
Netherlands	—N/a	Niki Wories	—N/a	—N/a
New Zealand	—N/a	Sarah Isabella Bardua	—N/a	—N/a
New Zealand	—N/a	Brooke Tamepo	—N/a	—N/a
Philippines	Yamato Rowe	—N/a	—N/a	—N/a
Romania	—N/a	Amanda Stan	—N/a	—N/a
Russia	—N/a	Evgenia Medvedeva	—N/a	—N/a
Singapore	Chadwick Wang	—N/a	—N/a	—N/a
South Korea	Cha Jun-hwan	Lee Eun-seo	—N/a	—N/a
Spain	—N/a	—N/a	—N/a	Olivia Smart / Adrián Díaz
Sweden	—N/a	Josefin Taljegard	—N/a	—N/a
Switzerland	—N/a	Alexia Paganini	—N/a	—N/a
United States	Jason Brown	Starr Andrews	Jessica Calalang / Brian Johnson	—N/a
United States	—N/a	Bradie Tennell	Haven Denney / Brandon Frazier	—N/a

=== Changes to preliminary assignments ===
Date	Discipline	Withdrew	Ref.
September 7	Ice dance	(United States) Kaitlin Hawayek / Jean-Luc Baker	
September 18	Men	(Australia) Brendan Kerry	
September 18	Ladies	(Canada) Larkyn Austman	

== Results ==
=== Men's singles ===
Rank	Name	Nation	Total points	SP		FS	
1	Yuzuru Hanyu	Japan	263.65	1	97.74	2	165.91
2	Cha Jun-hwan	South Korea	259.78	2	90.56	1	169.22
3	Roman Sadovsky	Canada	233.86	4	78.14	4	155.72
4	Jason Brown	United States	233.43	3	88.90	5	144.33
5	Kévin Aymoz	France	227.12	8	64.19	3	162.93
6	Bennet Toman	Canada	208.19	7	67.58	6	140.61
7	Julian Zhi Jie Yee	Malaysia	201.29	5	74.86	8	126.43
8	Kevin Reynolds	Canada	198.83	6	68.37	7	130.46
9	Mark Gorodnitsky	Israel	187.06	9	63.10	9	123.96
10	Andrew Dodds	Australia	161.99	11	52.96	10	109.03
11	Conor Stakelum	Ireland	153.90	10	54.71	11	99.19
12	Harry Mattick	Great Britain	146.25	12	50.99	12	95.26
13	Adonis Wai Chung Wong	Hong Kong	140.70	14	47.29	13	93.71
14	Yamato Rowe	Philippines	137.17	16	45.85	14	91.32
15	Jordan Dodds	Australia	135.08	15	46.49	15	88.59
16	Chadwick Wang	Singapore	127.99	17	40.99	16	87.00
17	Samuel McAllister	Ireland	126.31	13	47.89	17	78.42
18	Diego Saldana	Mexico	105.86	18	37.17	18	68.69
WD	Donovan Carrillo	Mexico	withdrew from competition				

=== Ladies' singles ===
Rank	Name	Nation	Total points	SP		FS	
1	Bradie Tennell	United States	206.41	2	69.26	1	137.15
2	Evgenia Medvedeva	Russia	204.89	1	70.98	2	133.91
3	Maé-Bérénice Méité	France	178.89	3	58.23	3	120.66
4	Kailani Craine	Australia	167.84	6	56.20	4	111.64
5	Wakaba Higuchi	Japan	167.01	4	57.54	5	109.47
6	Alicia Pineault	Canada	159.70	9	53.47	6	107.23
7	Starr Andrews	United States	159.63	5	56.70	7	102.93
8	Alexia Paganini	Switzerland	157.82	7	56.07	8	101.75
9	Yura Matsuda	Japan	143.02	12	47.75	9	95.27
10	Brooklee Han	Australia	130.44	8	54.05	12	76.39
11	Andrea Montesinos Cantu	Mexico	128.15	15	43.25	10	84.90
12	Eliška Březinová	Czech Republic	128.05	10	51.26	13	76.19
13	Josefin Taljegard	Sweden	127.96	13	47.32	11	80.64
14	Niki Wories	Netherlands	116.00	11	48.86	16	67.84
15	Netta Schreiber	Israel	114.90	16	41.86	15	73.04
16	Sofia del Rio	Mexico	109.40	14	43.86	18	65.54
17	Lee Eun-seo	South Korea	103.77	19	30.06	14	73.71
18	Brooke Tamepo	New Zealand	96.69	18	30.61	17	66.08
19	Anastassiya Khvan	Kazakhstan	93.63	17	33.66	19	59.97
20	Sarah Isabella Bardua	New Zealand	82.03	22	25.41	20	56.62
21	Eva Dögg Sæmundsdóttir	Iceland	79.87	20	28.82	22	51.05
22	Julia Gretarsdottir	Iceland	79.62	21	26.69	21	52.93
WD	Amanda Stan	Romania	withdrew from competition				

=== Pairs ===
Rank	Name	Nation	Total points	SP		FS	
1	Vanessa James / Morgan Ciprès	France	210.21	1	73.81	1	136.40
2	Kirsten Moore-Towers / Michael Marinaro	Canada	176.32	2	64.73	2	111.59
3	Haven Denney / Brandon Frazier	United States	164.43	3	61.91	3	102.52
4	Jessica Calalang / Brian Johnson	United States	150.63	4	50.25	4	100.38
5	Lori-Ann Matte / Thierry Ferland	Canada	121.44	5	46.66	5	74.78

=== Ice dance ===
Rank	Name	Nation	Total points	RD		FD	
1	Kaitlyn Weaver / Andrew Poje	Canada	197.27	1	76.53	1	120.74
2	Olivia Smart / Adrián Díaz	Spain	171.41	2	67.35	2	104.06
3	Carolane Soucisse / Shane Firus	Canada	166.24	3	65.38	4	100.86
4	Wang Shiyue / Liu Xinyu	China	165.06	4	63.57	3	101.49
5	Chen Hong / Sun Zhuoming	China	148.74	5	56.87	5	91.87
6	Molly Lanaghan / Dmitre Razgulajevs	Canada	138.97	6	53.01	6	85.96
7	Teodora Markova / Simon Daze	Bulgaria	106.13	7	43.26	7	62.87
