= 2018–19 ISU Challenger Series =

Figure skating tournament

- Type: ISU Challenger Series
- Date: August 1 – December 8, 2018
- Season: 2018–19
- Previous: 2017–18 ISU Challenger Series
- Next: 2019–20 ISU Challenger Series

The 2018–19 ISU Challenger Series was held from August to December 2018. It was the fifth season that the ISU Challenger Series, a group of senior-level international figure skating competitions, was held.

== Competitions ==
This season, the series included the following events.

Date	Event	Location	Notes	Results
August 1–5	(Thailand) 2018 Asian Open Trophy	Bangkok, Thailand	Pairs competition did not qualify as a Challenger Series event.	Details
September 12–16	(Italy) 2018 Lombardia Trophy	Bergamo, Italy		Details
September 12–16	(United States) 2018 U.S. International Classic	Salt Lake City, Utah, United States		Details
September 19–22	(Slovakia) 2018 Ondrej Nepela Trophy	Bratislava, Slovakia	Pairs competition did not qualify as a Challenger Series event.	Details
September 20–22	(Canada) 2018 Autumn Classic International	Oakville, Ontario, Canada		Details
September 26–29	(Germany) 2018 Nebelhorn Trophy	Oberstdorf, Germany		Details
October 4–7	(Finland) 2018 Finlandia Trophy	Espoo, Finland		Details
November 11–18	(Austria) 2018 Inge Solar Memorial – Alpen Trophy	Innsbruck, Austria	Pairs competition did not qualify as a Challenger Series event.	Details
November 26 – December 2	(Estonia) 2018 Tallinn Trophy	Tallinn, Estonia		Details
December 5–8	(Croatia) 2018 Golden Spin of Zagreb	Zagreb, Croatia		Details

== Medal summary ==
=== Men's singles ===
Competition	Gold	Silver	Bronze	Results
(Thailand) Asian Open Trophy	(Japan) Sōta Yamamoto	(Chinese Taipei) Tsao Chih-i	(South Korea) Byun Se-jong	Details
(Italy) Lombardia Trophy	(Japan) Shoma Uno	(Russia) Dmitri Aliev	(Russia) Andrei Lazukin	Details
(United States) U.S. International Classic	(Canada) Nam Nguyen	(Czech Republic) Michal Březina	(United States) Jimmy Ma	Details
(Slovakia) Ondrej Nepela Trophy	(Russia) Mikhail Kolyada	(Russia) Sergei Voronov	(Japan) Keiji Tanaka	Details
(Canada) Autumn Classic International	(Japan) Yuzuru Hanyu	(South Korea) Cha Jun-hwan	(Canada) Roman Sadovsky	Details
(Germany) Nebelhorn Trophy	(Canada) Keegan Messing	(Sweden) Alexander Majorov	(Russia) Artur Dmitriev	Details
(Finland) Finlandia Trophy	(Russia) Mikhail Kolyada	(South Korea) Cha Jun-hwan	(Georgia (country)) Morisi Kvitelashvili	Details
(Austria) 2018 Alpen Trophy	(Italy) Daniel Grassl	(Canada) Roman Sadovsky	(United States) Tomoki Hiwatashi	Details
(Estonia) 2018 Tallinn Trophy	(Russia) Maxim Kovtun	(United States) Vincent Zhou	(Russia) Anton Shulepov	Details
(Croatia) 2018 Golden Spin of Zagreb	(United States) Jason Brown	(Russia) Mikhail Kolyada	(Russia) Alexander Samarin	Details

=== Ladies' singles ===
Competition	Gold	Silver	Bronze	Results
(Thailand) Asian Open Trophy	(South Korea) Lim Eun-soo	(Japan) Yuna Shiraiwa	(Japan) Mako Yamashita	Details
(Italy) Lombardia Trophy	(Russia) Elizaveta Tuktamysheva	(Russia) Sofia Samodurova	(Japan) Mako Yamashita	Details
(United States) U.S. International Classic	(Japan) Satoko Miyahara	(South Korea) Lim Eun-soo	(South Korea) Kim Ye-lim	Details
(Slovakia) Ondrej Nepela Trophy	(Japan) Rika Kihira	(Kazakhstan) Elizabet Tursynbaeva	(Russia) Stanislava Konstantinova	Details
(Canada) Autumn Classic International	(United States) Bradie Tennell	(Russia) Evgenia Medvedeva	(France) Maé-Bérénice Méité	Details
(Germany) Nebelhorn Trophy	(Russia) Alina Zagitova	(Japan) Mai Mihara	(Belgium) Loena Hendrickx	Details
(Finland) Finlandia Trophy	(Russia) Elizaveta Tuktamysheva	(Kazakhstan) Elizabet Tursynbaeva	(Finland) Viveca Lindfors	Details
(Austria) 2018 Alpen Trophy	(Russia) Anna Tarusina	(Russia) Serafima Sakhanovich	(Australia) Brooklee Han	Details
(Estonia) 2018 Tallinn Trophy	(Russia) Serafima Sakhanovich	(United States) Ting Cui	(Finland) Viveca Lindfors	Details
(Croatia) 2018 Golden Spin of Zagreb	(United States) Bradie Tennell	(Russia) Anastasiia Gubanova	(United States) Mariah Bell	Details

=== Pairs ===
Competition	Gold	Silver	Bronze	Results
(Italy) Lombardia Trophy	(Russia) Natalia Zabiiako / Alexander Enbert	(Russia) Aleksandra Boikova / Dmitrii Kozlovskii	(Italy) Nicole Della Monica / Matteo Guarise	Details
(United States) U.S. International Classic	(United States) Ashley Cain / Timothy LeDuc	(United States) Audrey Lu / Misha Mitrofanov	(Australia) Ekaterina Alexandrovskaya / Harley Windsor	Details
(Canada) Autumn Classic International	(France) Vanessa James / Morgan Ciprès	(Canada) Kirsten Moore-Towers / Michael Marinaro	(United States) Haven Denney / Brandon Frazier	Details
(Germany) Nebelhorn Trophy	(Russia) Alisa Efimova / Alexander Korovin	(United States) Alexa Scimeca Knierim / Chris Knierim	(United States) Deanna Stellato / Nathan Bartholomay	Details
(Finland) Finlandia Trophy	(Russia) Evgenia Tarasova / Vladimir Morozov	(Canada) Kirsten Moore-Towers / Michael Marinaro	(Russia) Aleksandra Boikova / Dmitrii Kozlovskii	Details
(Estonia) 2018 Tallinn Trophy	(Austria) Miriam Ziegler / Severin Kiefer	(United States) Tarah Kayne / Danny O'Shea	(United States) Jessica Calalang / Brian Johnson	Details
(Croatia) 2018 Golden Spin of Zagreb	(Russia) Alisa Efimova / Alexander Korovin	(United States) Alexa Scimeca Knierim / Chris Knierim	(United States) Deanna Stellato / Nathan Bartholomay	Details

=== Ice dance ===
Competition	Gold	Silver	Bronze	Results
(Thailand) Asian Open Trophy	(China) Wang Shiyue / Liu Xinyu	(United States) Rachel Parsons / Michael Parsons	(Japan) Misato Komatsubara / Tim Koleto	Details
(Italy) Lombardia Trophy	(Italy) Charlène Guignard / Marco Fabbri	(United States) Rachel Parsons / Michael Parsons	(Spain) Sara Hurtado / Kirill Khaliavin	Details
(United States) U.S. International Classic	(United States) Madison Hubbell / Zachary Donohue	(United States) Christina Carreira / Anthony Ponomarenko	(Japan) Misato Komatsubara / Tim Koleto	Details
(Slovakia) Ondrej Nepela Trophy	(Russia) Victoria Sinitsina / Nikita Katsalapov	(United States) Lorraine McNamara / Quinn Carpenter	(Russia) Betina Popova / Sergey Mozgov	Details
(Canada) Autumn Classic International	(Canada) Kaitlyn Weaver / Andrew Poje	(Spain) Olivia Smart / Adrián Díaz	(Canada) Carolane Soucisse / Shane Firus	Details
(Germany) Nebelhorn Trophy	(Canada) Piper Gilles / Paul Poirier	(United States) Rachel Parsons / Michael Parsons	(United States) Christina Carreira / Anthony Ponomarenko	Details
(Finland) Finlandia Trophy	(Russia) Alexandra Stepanova / Ivan Bukin	(Spain) Olivia Smart / Adrián Díaz	(France) Marie-Jade Lauriault / Romain Le Gac	Details
(Austria) 2018 Alpen Trophy	(Italy) Charlène Guignard / Marco Fabbri	(United States) Lorraine McNamara / Quinn Carpenter	(France) Marie-Jade Lauriault / Romain Le Gac	Details
(Estonia) 2018 Tallinn Trophy	(United States) Christina Carreira / Anthony Ponomarenko	(Russia) Anastasia Skoptcova / Kirill Aleshin	(Poland) Natalia Kaliszek / Maksym Spodyriev	Details
(Croatia) 2018 Golden Spin of Zagreb	(Canada) Piper Gilles / Paul Poirier	(Poland) Natalia Kaliszek / Maksym Spodyriev	(Russia) Betina Popova / Sergey Mozgov	Details

=== Medal standings ===
Rank	Nation	Gold	Silver	Bronze	Total
1	Russia (RUS)	14	9	8	31
2	United States (USA)	6	12	8	26
3	Canada (CAN)	5	3	2	10
4	Japan (JPN)	5	2	5	12
5	Italy (ITA)	3	0	1	4
6	South Korea (KOR)	1	3	2	6
7	France (FRA)	1	0	3	4
8	Austria (AUT)	1	0	0	1
8	China (CHN)	1	0	0	1
10	Spain (ESP)	0	2	1	3
11	Kazakhstan (KAZ)	0	2	0	2
12	Poland (POL)	0	1	1	2
13	Chinese Taipei (TPE)	0	1	0	1
13	Czech Republic (CZE)	0	1	0	1
13	Sweden (SWE)	0	1	0	1
16	Australia (AUS)	0	0	2	2
16	Finland (FIN)	0	0	2	2
18	Belgium (BEL)	0	0	1	1
18	Georgia (GEO)	0	0	1	1
Totals (19 entries)		37	37	37	111

== Challenger Series rankings ==
The ISU Challenger Series rankings were formed by combining the two highest final scores of each skater or team.

=== Men's singles ===
No.	Skater	Nation	First event	Score	Second event	Score	Total score
1	Mikhail Kolyada	Russia	Ondrej Nepela Trophy	274.37	Golden Spin of Zagreb	253.14	527.51
2	Cha Jun-hwan	South Korea	Autumn Classic International	259.78	Finlandia Trophy	239.19	498.97
3	Jason Brown	United States	Autumn Classic International	233.23	Golden Spin of Zagreb	263.42	496.65
4	Dmitri Aliev	Russia	Lombardia Trophy	250.55	Finlandia Trophy	224.95	475.50
5	Daniel Grassl	Italy	Alpen Trophy	230.50	Golden Spin of Zagreb	229.82	460.32

=== Ladies' singles ===
No.	Skater	Nation	First event	Score	Second event	Score	Total score
1	Elizaveta Tuktamysheva	Russia	Lombardia Trophy	206.07	Finlandia Trophy	202.85	408.92
2	Bradie Tennell	United States	Autumn Classic International	206.41	Golden Spin of Zagreb	202.41	408.82
3	Elizabet Tursynbaeva	Kazakhstan	Ondrej Nepela Trophy	192.30	Finlandia Trophy	200.74	393.04
4	Mariah Bell	United States	Nebelhorn Trophy	188.97	Golden Spin of Zagreb	196.60	385.57
5	Anastasiia Gubanova	Russia	Tallinn Trophy	180.73	Golden Spin of Zagreb	198.65	379.38

=== Pairs ===
No.	Team	Nation	First event	Score	Second event	Score	Total score
1	Aleksandra Boikova / Dmitrii Kozlovskii	Russia	Lombardia Trophy	191.99	Finlandia Trophy	188.54	380.53
2	Kirsten Moore-Towers / Michael Marinaro	Canada	Finlandia Trophy	193.93	Autumn Classic International	176.32	370.25
3	Alisa Efimova / Alexander Korovin	Russia	Nebelhorn Trophy	178.94	Golden Spin of Zagreb	183.89	362.83
4	Miriam Ziegler / Severin Kiefer	Austria	Finlandia Trophy	176.09	Tallinn Trophy	184.60	360.69
5	Alexa Scimeca Knierim / Chris Knierim	United States	Nebelhorn Trophy	177.22	Golden Spin of Zagreb	182.84	360.06

=== Ice dance ===
No.	Team	Nation	First event	Score	Second event	Score	Total score
1	Piper Gilles / Paul Poirier	Canada	Nebelhorn Trophy	194.12	Golden Spin of Zagreb	201.27	395.39
2	Charlène Guignard / Marco Fabbri	Italy	Lombardia Trophy	193.28	Alpen Trophy	195.39	388.67
3	Christina Carreira / Anthony Ponomarenko	United States	Nebelhorn Trophy	177.49	Tallinn Trophy	180.22	357.71
4	Lorraine McNamara / Quinn Carpenter	United States	Ondrej Nepela Trophy	178.64	Alpen Trophy	174.35	352.99
5	Rachel Parsons / Michael Parsons	United States	Lombardia Trophy	170.68	Nebelhorn Trophy	180.95	351.63

== Top scores ==
=== Men's singles ===
Top 10 best scores in the men's combined total
No.	Skater	Nation	Score	Event
1	Shoma Uno	Japan	276.20	2018 Lombardia Trophy
2	Mikhail Kolyada	Russia	274.37	2018 Ondrej Nepela Trophy
3	Yuzuru Hanyu	Japan	263.65	2018 Autumn Classic International
4	Jason Brown	United States	263.42	2018 Golden Spin of Zagreb
5	Cha Jun-hwan	South Korea	259.78	2018 Autumn Classic International
6	Keegan Messing	Canada	257.16	2018 Nebelhorn Trophy
7	Dmitri Aliev	Russia	250.55	2018 Lombardia Trophy
8	Maxim Kovtun	Russia	247.55	2018 Tallinn Trophy
9	Andrei Lazukin	Russia	243.45	2018 Lombardia Trophy
10	Sergei Voronov	Russia	239.73	2018 Ondrej Nepela Trophy

Top 10 best scores in the men's short program
No.	Skater	Nation	Score	Event
1	Shoma Uno	Japan	104.15	2018 Lombardia Trophy
2	Yuzuru Hanyu	Japan	97.74	2018 Autumn Classic International
3	Mikhail Kolyada	Russia	97.04	2018 Golden Spin of Zagreb
4	Jason Brown	United States	95.50	2018 Golden Spin of Zagreb
5	Keegan Messing	Canada	90.63	2018 Nebelhorn Trophy
6	Cha Jun-hwan	South Korea	90.56	2018 Autumn Classic International
7	Andrei Lazukin	Russia	87.92	2018 Lombardia Trophy
8	Dmitri Aliev	Russia	86.57	2018 Lombardia Trophy
9	Alexander Samarin	Russia	86.29	2018 Golden Spin of Zagreb
10	Matteo Rizzo	Italy	85.51	2018 Lombardia Trophy

Top 10 best scores in the men's free skating
No.	Skater	Nation	Score	Event
1	Mikhail Kolyada	Russia	177.55	2018 Ondrej Nepela Trophy
2	Shoma Uno	Japan	172.05	2018 Lombardia Trophy
3	Cha Jun-hwan	South Korea	169.22	2018 Autumn Classic International
4	Jason Brown	United States	167.92	2018 Golden Spin of Zagreb
5	Maxim Kovtun	Russia	166.64	2018 Tallinn Trophy
6	Keegan Messing	Canada	166.53	2018 Nebelhorn Trophy
7	Yuzuru Hanyu	Japan	165.91	2018 Autumn Classic International
8	Dmitri Aliev	Russia	163.98	2018 Lombardia Trophy
9	Kévin Aymoz	France	162.93	2018 Autumn Classic International
10	Sergei Voronov	Russia	157.96	2018 Ondrej Nepela Trophy

=== Ladies' singles ===
Top 10 best scores in the ladies' combined total
No.	Skater	Nation	Score	Event
1	Alina Zagitova	Russia	238.43	2018 Nebelhorn Trophy
2	Rika Kihira	Japan	218.16	2018 Ondrej Nepela Trophy
3	Mai Mihara	Japan	209.22	2018 Nebelhorn Trophy
4	Bradie Tennell	United States	206.41	2018 Autumn Classic International
5	Elizaveta Tuktamysheva	Russia	206.07	2018 Lombardia Trophy
6	Evgenia Medvedeva	Russia	204.89	2018 Autumn Classic International
7	Loena Hendrickx	Belgium	204.16	2018 Nebelhorn Trophy
8	Serafima Sakhanovich	Russia	202.62	2018 Tallinn Trophy
9	Satoko Miyahara	Japan	201.23	2018 U.S. International Classic
10	Elizabet Tursynbaeva	Kazakhstan	200.74	2018 Finlandia Trophy

Top 10 best scores in the ladies' short program
No.	Skater	Nation	Score	Event
1	Alina Zagitova	Russia	79.93	2018 Nebelhorn Trophy
2	Elizaveta Tuktamysheva	Russia	73.83	2018 Finlandia Trophy
3	Loena Hendrickx	Belgium	71.50	2018 Nebelhorn Trophy
3	Bradie Tennell	United States	71.50	2018 Golden Spin of Zagreb
5	Evgenia Medvedeva	Russia	70.98	2018 Autumn Classic International
6	Elizabet Tursynbaeva	Kazakhstan	70.95	2018 Finlandia Trophy
7	Mai Mihara	Japan	70.94	2018 Nebelhorn Trophy
8	Rika Kihira	Japan	70.79	2018 Ondrej Nepela Trophy
9	Serafima Sakhanovich	Russia	70.33	2018 Tallinn Trophy
10	Mariah Bell	United States	70.02	2018 Nebelhorn Trophy

Top 10 best scores in the ladies' free skating
No.	Skater	Nation	Score	Event
1	Alina Zagitova	Russia	158.50	2018 Nebelhorn Trophy
2	Rika Kihira	Japan	147.37	2018 Ondrej Nepela Trophy
3	Elizaveta Tuktamysheva	Russia	140.38	2018 Lombardia Trophy
4	Mai Mihara	Japan	138.28	2018 Nebelhorn Trophy
5	Bradie Tennell	United States	137.15	2018 Autumn Classic International
6	Evgenia Medvedeva	Russia	133.91	2018 Autumn Classic International
7	Satoko Miyahara	Japan	133.77	2018 U.S. International Classic
8	Loena Hendrickx	Belgium	132.66	2018 Nebelhorn Trophy
9	Serafima Sakhanovich	Russia	132.29	2018 Tallinn Trophy
10	Ting Cui	United States	132.23	2018 Tallinn Trophy

=== Pairs ===
Top 10 best scores in the pairs' combined total
No.	Team	Nation	Score	Event
1	Vanessa James / Morgan Cipres	France	210.21	2018 Autumn Classic International
2	Evgenia Tarasova / Vladimir Morozov	Russia	198.98	2018 Finlandia Trophy
3	Natalia Zabiiako / Alexander Enbert	Russia	196.15	2018 Lombardia Trophy
4	Kirsten Moore-Towers / Michael Marinaro	Canada	193.93	2018 Finlandia Trophy
5	Aleksandra Boikova / Dmitrii Kozlovskii	Russia	191.99	2018 Lombardia Trophy
6	Alisa Efimova / Alexander Korovin	Russia	183.89	2018 Golden Spin of Zagreb
7	Alexa Scimeca Knierim / Chris Knierim	United States	182.84	2018 Golden Spin of Zagreb
8	Nicole Della Monica / Matteo Guarise	Italy	178.18	2018 Lombardia Trophy
9	Deanna Stellato / Nathan Bartholomay	United States	176.44	2018 Golden Spin of Zagreb
10	Miriam Ziegler / Severin Kiefer	Austria	176.09	2018 Finlandia Trophy

Top 10 best scores in the pairs' short program
No.	Team	Nation	Score	Event
1	Vanessa James / Morgan Ciprès	France	73.81	2018 Autumn Classic International
2	Evgenia Tarasova / Vladimir Morozov	Russia	73.27	2018 Finlandia Trophy
3	Natalia Zabiiako / Alexander Enbert	Russia	72.50	2018 Lombardia Trophy
4	Aleksandra Boikova / Dmitrii Kozlovskii	Russia	67.81	2018 Finlandia Trophy
5	Nicole Della Monica / Matteo Guarise	Italy	66.93	2018 Lombardia Trophy
6	Kirsten Moore-Towers / Michael Marinaro	Canada	66.52	2018 Finlandia Trophy
7	Miriam Ziegler / Severin Kiefer	Austria	66.08	2018 Tallinn Trophy
8	Alisa Efimova / Alexander Korovin	Russia	65.84	2018 Golden Spin of Zagreb
9	Ashley Cain / Timothy LeDuc	United States	64.34	2018 Golden Spin of Zagreb
10	Alexa Scimeca Knierim / Chris Knierim	United States	64.04	2018 Golden Spin of Zagreb

Top 10 best scores in the pairs' free skating
No.	Team	Nation	Score	Event
1	Vanessa James / Morgan Ciprès	France	136.40	2018 Autumn Classic International
2	Kirsten Moore-Towers / Michael Marinaro	Canada	127.41	2018 Finlandia Trophy
3	Aleksandra Boikova / Dmitrii Kozlovskii	Russia	126.78	2018 Lombardia Trophy
4	Evgenia Tarasova / Vladimir Morozov	Russia	125.71	2018 Finlandia Trophy
5	Natalia Zabiiako / Alexander Enbert	Russia	123.65	2018 Lombardia Trophy
6	Alexa Scimeca Knierim / Chris Knierim	United States	118.80	2018 Golden Spin of Zagreb
7	Alisa Efimova / Alexander Korovin	Russia	118.05	2018 Golden Spin of Zagreb
8	Deanna Stellato / Nathan Bartholomay	United States	116.32	2018 Golden Spin of Zagreb
9	Ashley Cain / Timothy LeDuc	United States	113.95	2018 U.S. International Classic
10	Miriam Ziegler / Severin Kiefer	Austria	113.83	2018 Finlandia Trophy

=== Ice dance ===
Top 10 best scores in the combined total (ice dance)
No.	Team	Nation	Score	Event
1	Piper Gilles / Paul Poirier	Canada	201.27	2018 Golden Spin of Zagreb
2	Alexandra Stepanova / Ivan Bukin	Russia	200.78	2018 Finlandia Trophy
3	Madison Hubbell / Zachary Donohue	United States	197.42	2018 U.S. International Classic
4	Kaitlyn Weaver / Andrew Poje	Canada	197.27	2018 Autumn Classic
5	Victoria Sinitsina / Nikita Katsalapov	Russia	196.42	2018 Ondrej Nepela Trophy
6	Charlène Guignard / Marco Fabbri	Italy	195.39	2018 Alpen Trophy
7	Rachel Parsons / Michael Parsons	United States	180.95	2018 Nebelhorn Trophy
8	Christina Carreira / Anthony Ponomarenko	United States	180.22	2018 Tallinn Trophy
9	Olivia Smart / Adrián Díaz	Spain	180.07	2018 Finlandia Trophy
10	Anastasia Skoptcova / Kirill Aleshin	Russia	179.78	2018 Tallinn Trophy

Top 10 best scores in the rhythm dance
No.	Team	Nation	Score	Event
1	Piper Gilles / Paul Poirier	Canada	79.80	2018 Golden Spin of Zagreb
2	Alexandra Stepanova / Ivan Bukin	Russia	79.16	2018 Finlandia Trophy
3	Madison Hubbell / Zachary Donohue	United States	79.11	2018 U.S. International Classic
4	Charlène Guignard / Marco Fabbri	Italy	76.96	2018 Alpen Trophy
5	Kaitlyn Weaver / Andrew Poje	Canada	76.53	2018 Autumn Classic
6	Victoria Sinitsina / Nikita Katsalapov	Russia	75.96	2018 Ondrej Nepela Trophy
7	Olivia Smart / Adrián Díaz	Spain	72.61	2018 Finlandia Trophy
8	Anastasia Skoptcova / Kirill Aleshin	Russia	71.17	2018 Tallinn Trophy
9	Carolane Soucisse / Shane Firus	Canada	70.79	2018 Finlandia Trophy
10	Lorraine McNamara / Quinn Carpenter	United States	70.37	2018 Ondrej Nepela Trophy

Top 10 best scores in the free dance
No.	Team	Nation	Score	Event
1	Alexandra Stepanova / Ivan Bukin	Russia	121.62	2018 Finlandia Trophy
2	Piper Gilles / Paul Poirier	Canada	121.47	2018 Golden Spin of Zagreb
3	Kaitlyn Weaver / Andrew Poje	Canada	120.74	2018 Autumn Classic
4	Victoria Sinitsina / Nikita Katsalapov	Russia	120.46	2018 Ondrej Nepela Trophy
5	Charlène Guignard / Marco Fabbri	Italy	118.43	2018 Alpen Trophy
6	Madison Hubbell / Zachary Donohue	United States	118.31	2018 U.S. International Classic
7	Rachel Parsons / Michael Parsons	United States	110.93	2018 Nebelhorn Trophy
8	Christina Carreira / Anthony Ponomarenko	United States	110.64	2018 Tallinn Trophy
9	Natalia Kaliszek / Maksym Spodyriev	Poland	109.01	2018 Tallinn Trophy
10	Anastasia Skoptcova / Kirill Aleshin	Russia	108.61	2018 Tallinn Trophy
