= Rachel Parsons (figure skater) =

American ice dancer

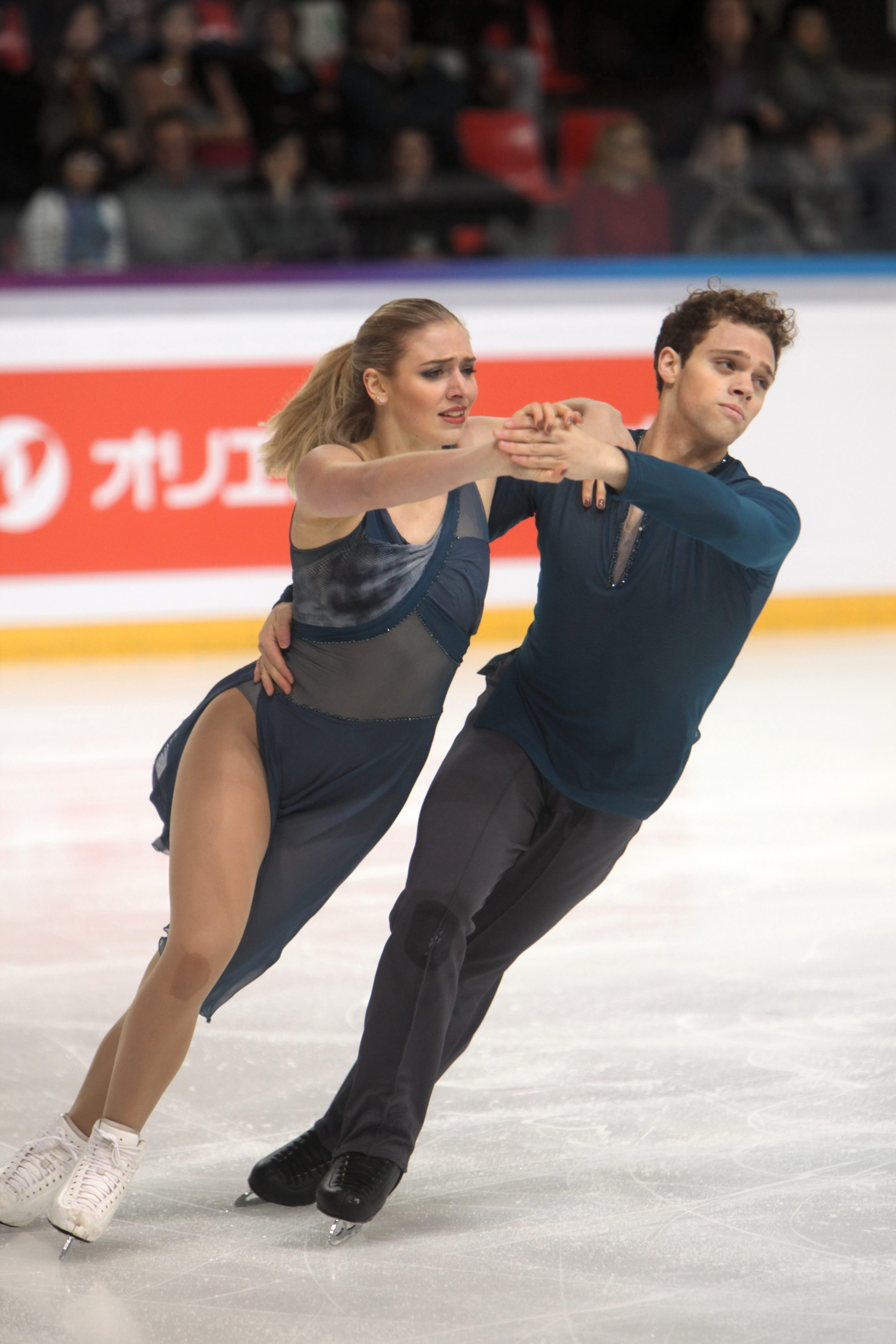
- The Parsons at the 2018 Internationaux de France

Personal information
- Full name: Rachel Marie Parsons
- Born: November 19, 1997 (age 28) Rockville, Maryland, U.S.
- Home town: Derwood, Maryland, U.S.
- Height: 5 ft 4 in (1.62 m)

Figure skating career
- Country: United States
- Began skating: 2003
- Retired: April 2, 2019
Medal record
Figure skating: Ice dance
Representing United States
World Junior Championships
Gold medal – first place	2017 Taipei	Ice dance
Silver medal – second place	2016 Debrecen	Ice dance
Junior Grand Prix Final
Gold medal – first place	2016–17 Marseille	Ice dance
Bronze medal – third place	2015–16 Barcelona	Ice dance

Rachel Marie Parsons (born November 19, 1997) is an American former competitive ice dancer. With her brother Michael Parsons, she is the 2018 NHK Trophy bronze medalist and a four-time silver medalist on the ISU Challenger Series (2018 CS Asian Open, 2018 CS Nebelhorn Trophy, 2018 CS Lombardia Trophy, 2017 CS Ondrej Nepela Memorial). Earlier in their career together, the Parsons won gold at the 2017 World Junior Championships, the 2016–17 Junior Grand Prix Final and in the junior event at the 2017 U.S. Championships. They placed 4th at the 2012 Winter Youth Olympics.

== Personal life ==
Rachel Parsons was born November 19, 1997, in Rockville, Maryland. She has two siblings – Michael and Katie. In 2016, she graduated from Magruder High School in Rockville, Maryland and attended Flagler College in St. Augustine, Florida. In August 2019, she came out publicly as bisexual.

Parsons participated in the June 1, 2020 protests in Lafayette Square, after concluding that "sitting at home and being angry wasn’t doing enough.” She was hit by a rubber bullet when federal security services opened fire. A photograph of Parsons was featured on the June 2, 2020, edition of The Washington Post.

== Career ==
=== Early years ===
Rachel Parsons started skating at age six because she wanted to learn how to stand up on the ice. After joining the Wheaton Ice Skating Academy in June 2006, she started focusing solely on ice dance. With Kyle MacMillan, she won gold on the juvenile level at the 2009 U.S. Championships and then gold on the intermediate level at the 2010 U.S. Championships.

She teamed up with her older brother, Michael, in February 2010. They won gold on the novice level at the 2011 U.S. Championships and debuted on the Junior Grand Prix (JGP) series in September 2011, placing 9th in Gdańsk, Poland. After taking the junior pewter medal at the 2012 U.S. Championships, they represented the United States at the 2012 Winter Youth Olympics, placing 4th. They were also selected for the 2012 World Junior Championships in Minsk, Belarus, where they finished 15th.

Competing in the 2012–13 JGP series, the Parsons placed 6th in Linz, Austria, before taking bronze in Zagreb, Croatia.

=== 2013–14 season ===
The Parsons obtained silver at both of their 2013–14 JGP assignments, which took place in Košice, Slovakia, and Ostrava, Czech Republic. They qualified for the JGP Final in Fukuoka, Japan, where they placed sixth. The duo won bronze at the junior level at the 2014 U.S. Championships and capped off their season with an 8th-place finish at the 2014 World Junior Championships in Sofia, Bulgaria.

=== 2014–15 season ===
The Parsons medaled at both their 2014–15 JGP assignments, receiving bronze in Aichi, Japan, and silver in Zagreb, Croatia. They finished as the first alternates for the JGP Final and won silver on the junior level at the 2015 U.S. Championships. Concluding their season, they placed fourth at the 2015 World Junior Championships in Tallinn, Estonia.

=== 2015–16 season: World Junior silver and Junior Grand Prix Final bronze ===
During the 2015–16 JGP series, the Parsons were awarded gold in Bratislava, Slovakia, and Zagreb, Croatia. Competing in Barcelona, Spain, at their second JGP Final, the siblings took the bronze medal behind Lorraine McNamara / Quinn Carpenter and Alla Loboda / Pavel Drozd, having placed second in the short dance and fifth in the free. At the 2016 World Junior Championships in Debrecen, Hungary, they placed first in the short and second in the free, winning the silver medal behind McNamara/Carpenter.

=== 2016–17 season: World Junior champion and Junior Grand Prix Final gold ===
Competing in their sixth JGP season, the Parsons were awarded gold in Yokohama, Japan, and Dresden, Germany, both times ahead of Russia's Anastasia Shpilevaya / Grigory Smirnov. In December 2016, they competed at the JGP Final in Marseille, France; ranked second in the short and first in the free, they won the title by a margin of 0.63 over Loboda/Drozd.

The following month, the Parsons would win their first junior national title at the 2017 U.S. Championships, over 11 points clear of the field. The siblings would cap off their undefeated season by winning the 2017 World Junior Championships; similar to the 2016–17 JGP Final, the Parsons won the event overall after placing second in the short and first in the free, earning an even narrower victory of 0.56 ahead of Loboda/Drozd. The Parsons earned personal bests in their combined total and free dance scores at their fifth trip to the Junior Championships.

=== 2017–18 season: International senior debut ===
Moving to the senior level, the Parsons debuted at the Lake Placid Ice Dance International, winning the silver medal behind longtime rivals McNamara/Carpenter, who were also making their senior debut. They then took the silver medal at the 2017 CS Ondrej Nepela Trophy, their debut on the ISU Challenger series. Assigned to two Grand Prix events, they finished ninth at Skate America and seventh at the Rostelecom Cup. They then competed at a second Challenger event, the Golden Spin of Zagreb, where they finished eighth.

Competing at the senior level at the 2018 U.S. Championships, they placed fifth, and thus did not qualify for the U.S. Olympic team. They were instead sent to the 2018 Four Continents Championships, where they finished sixth.

=== 2018–19 season: Final season ===
"Skating has given me so much. I was able to travel all over the world, make so many unforgettable memories, meet the most incredible people, and compete proudly for my country. To experience all of this with my big brother by my side has been the best part. This sport has made me who I am today. I couldn’t be more grateful to everyone who has supported Michael and me through the years. I want to say a huge thank you to our friends, family, coaches, everyone at US Figure Skating, our sponsors who have made this dream possible and everyone else who helped us along the way, I feel so blessed. I’m not sure what this new chapter of my life will bring, but I’m excited about the future. I’ll continue to cheer Michael on as he continues on this incredible journey for the both of us, I’ll just be rooting for him from the stands."

— Rachel Parsons, April 2, 2019

After a second straight silver medal at Lake Placid's summer ice dance event, the siblings competed in three straight Challenger events, winning consecutive silver medals at the Asian Open, Nebelhorn Trophy and Nepela Trophy. At their first Grand Prix event in Japan, the 2018 NHK Trophy, they won their first and only Grand Prix medal, a bronze. At the 2018 Internationaux de France, their second Grand Prix, they finished fifth. At the 2019 U.S. Championships, the Parsons placed sixth.

On April 2, 2019, Rachel announced on Instagram that she was retiring from figure skating following a lengthy struggle with an eating disorder. Her brother Michael intended to continue skating, and subsequently formed a new partnership with Caroline Green.

== Programs ==
=== Ice dance with Michael Parsons ===
Season	Short dance	Free dance	Exhibition
2010–2011		The Firebird by Igor Stravinsky	
2011–2012	Psychedelic Sally by Eddie Jefferson	To Glory; Enigmatic Soul by Thomas Bergersen	
2012–2013	Hip hop: 4 Minutes by Justin Timberlake, Madonna; Blues: Cyber Shanty Town Blues by Christian HipHop Factory; Hip hop: 4 Minutes by Justin Timberlake, Madonna	Faust by Charles Gounod; Walpurgis Night; Three Nymphs	
2013–2014	Quickstep, Foxtrot, Quickstep: Funny Girl Overture by Jule Styne	New Moon by Alexandre Desplat; Time Back by Bad Style	
2014–2015	Rhumba: Fruta Fresca (Club remix) by Carlos Vives; Samba: Heart of the Wind by Robert Tree Cody	Notre-Dame de Paris by Riccardo Cocciante, Bruno Pelletier	Rhumba; Samba
2015–2016	Waltz: Cinderella's Departure for the Ball (from Cinderella) by Sergei Prokofiev	La Malamada; Palabras y Vientoby by Medialuna Tango Project	Elevation by U2
2016–2017	Hip hop: A Little Party Never Killed Nobody by Fergie, Q-Tip, GoonRock; Blues: Born to Die by Lana Del Rey; Hip hop	Singing in the Rain arranged by Sophia Sin, Alexander Goldstein	Knockin' on Heaven's Door by Selig; Disco Inferno by The Trammps with McNamara/Carpenter
2017–2018	Rhumba: Mambo Molly by Mambo Molly; Slow rhumba: Everybody's Got To Learn Sometime by Zucchero; Mambo: Congo Crazed by Mambo Molly	Ghost Dances; La Partida by Victor Jara; Sikuriadas; Quiaquenpita by Inti Illimani	
	Rhythm dance	Free dance	Exhibition
2018–2019	Tango: Vuelvo al Sur by Medialuna Tango Project; Tango: Tango Cha by Sergio Belem	To Build a Home by The Cinematic Orchestra & Patrick Watson; Bohemian Rhapsody by Queen	

== Competitive highlights ==
- GP – Event of the ISU Grand Prix Series
- CS – Event of the ISU Challenger Series
- JGP – Event of the ISU Junior Grand Prix Series

=== Ice dance with Michael Parsons ===
Competition placements at senior level
Season	2017–18	2018–19
Four Continents Championships	6th	
U.S. Championships	5th	6th
GP France		5th
GP NHK Trophy		3rd
GP Rostelecom Cup	7th	
GP Skate America	9th	
CS Asian Open Trophy		2nd
CS Golden Spin of Zagreb	8th	
CS Lombardia Trophy		2nd
CS Nebelhorn Trophy		2nd
CS Ondrej Nepela Trophy	2nd	
Lake Placid Ice Dance	2nd	2nd

Competition placements at junior level
Season	2011–12	2012–13	2013–14	2014–15	2015–16	2016–17
Winter Youth Olympics	4th					
World Junior Championships	15th		8th	4th	2nd	1st
Junior Grand Prix Final			6th		3rd	1st
U.S. Championships	4th		3rd	2nd	2nd	1st
JGP Austria		6th				
JGP Croatia		3rd		2nd	1st	
JGP Czech Republic			2nd			
JGP Germany						1st
JGP Japan				3rd		1st
JGP Poland	9th					
JGP Slovakia			2nd		1st	
Lake Placid Ice Dance					1st	1st
Toruń Cup				2nd		

== Detailed results ==
=== Ice dance with Michael Parsons ===
==== Senior level ====
Results in the 2017–18 season
Date	Event	SD		FD		Total	
Date	Event	P	Score	P	Score	P	Score
Jul 28–29, 2017	(United States) 2017 Lake Placid IDI	3	61.25	2	95.57	2	156.82
Sep 21–23, 2017	(Slovakia) 2017 CS Ondrej Nepela Trophy	2	67.48	3	95.66	2	163.14
Oct 20–22, 2017	(Russia) 2017 Rostelecom Cup	7	59.41	8	89.34	7	148.75
Nov 24–26, 2017	(United States) 2017 Skate America	8	58.36	9	87.18	9	145.54
Dec 6–9, 2017	(Croatia) 2017 CS Golden Spin of Zagreb	9	60.18	8	92.20	8	152.38
Dec 29, 2017–Jan 8, 2018	(United States) 2018 U.S. Championships	5	72.69	6	103.38	5	176.07
Jan 22–28, 2018	(Taiwan) 2018 Four Continents Championships	6	60.18	6	95.12	6	155.30

Results in the 2018–19 season
Date	Event	RD		FD		Total	
Date	Event	P	Score	P	Score	P	Score
Jul 24–27, 2018	(United States) 2018 Lake Placid IDI	2	—N/a	2	—N/a	2	164.74
Aug 1–5, 2018	(Thailand) 2018 CS Asian Open Figure Skating Trophy	1	64.47	3	92.66	2	157.13
Sep 12–16, 2018	(Italy) 2018 CS Lombardia Trophy	2	68.20	3	102.48	2	170.68
Sep 26–29, 2018	(Germany) 2018 CS Nebelhorn Trophy	2	70.02	2	110.93	2	180.95
Nov 9–11, 2018	(Japan) 2018 NHK Trophy	3	69.07	3	109.57	3	178.64
Nov 23–25, 2018	2018 Internationaux de France	6	68.14	6	103.03	5	171.17
Jan 19–27, 2019	(United States) 2019 U.S. Championships	6	72.52	7	97.74	6	170.26

==== Junior level ====
Results in the 2011–12 season
Date	Event	SD		FD		Total	
Date	Event	P	Score	P	Score	P	Score
Sep 14–17, 2011	2011 JGP Poland	10	43.03	9	64.94	9	107.97
Jan 15–17, 2012	(Austria) 2012 Winter Youth Olympics	4	44.69	4	69.53	4	114.22
Jan 22–29, 2012	(United States) 2012 U.S. Championships (Junior)	3	50.80	4	72.46	4	123.26
Feb 27–Mar 4, 2012	(Belarus) 2012 World Junior Championships	16	45.37	14	63.79	15	109.16

Results in the 2012–13 season
Date	Event	SD		FD		Total	
Date	Event	P	Score	P	Score	P	Score
Sep 12–15, 2012	2012 JGP Austria	4	51.07	8	62.98	6	114.05
Oct 3–6, 2012	2012 JGP Croatia	2	56.35	3	77.74	3	134.09

Results in the 2013–14 season
Date	Event	SD		FD		Total	
Date	Event	P	Score	P	Score	P	Score
Sep 12–15, 2013	2013 JGP Slovakia	2	52.09	2	79.01	2	131.10
Oct 2–5, 2013	2013 JGP Czech Republic	1	59.54	6	75.19	2	134.73
Dec 5–8, 2013	(Japan) 2013–14 Junior Grand Prix Final	6	46.11	6	70.49	6	116.60
Jan 5–12, 2014	(United States) 2014 U.S. Championships (Junior)	3	59.32	2	86.46	3	145.78
Mar 10–16, 2014	(Bulgaria) 2014 World Junior Championships	3	58.65	5	79.88	4	138.53

Results in the 2014–15 season
Date	Event	SD		FD		Total	
Date	Event	P	Score	P	Score	P	Score
Sep 11–14, 2014	2014 JGP Japan	1	55.71	3	75.71	3	131.42
Oct 8–11, 2014	2014 JGP Croatia	2	56.28	2	84.05	2	140.33
Jan 7–10, 2015	(Poland) Mentor Toruń Cup (Junior)	2	58.58	2	84.60	2	143.18
Jan 18–25, 2015	(United States) 2015 U.S. Championships (Junior)	2	60.61	2	84.37	2	144.98
Mar 2–8, 2015	(Estonia) 2015 World Junior Championships	4	58.39	5	82.55	4	140.94

Results in the 2015–16 season
Date	Event	SD		FD		Total	
Date	Event	P	Score	P	Score	P	Score
Jul 27–30, 2015	(United States) 2015 Lake Placid IDI (Junior)	1		1		1	141.41
Aug 19–22, 2015	2015 JGP Slovakia	2	59.02	1	90.40	1	149.42
Oct 7–10, 2015	2015 JGP Croatia	1	66.49	1	94.30	1	160.79
Dec 9–13, 2015	(Spain) 2015–16 Junior Grand Prix Final	2	64.91	5	79.50	3	144.41
Jan 15–24, 2016	(United States) 2016 U.S. Championships (Junior)	2	70.29	2	95.17	2	165.46
Mar 14–20, 2016	(Hungary) 2016 World Junior Championships	1	67.88	2	94.86	2	162.74

Results in the 2016–17 season
Date	Event	SD		FD		Total	
Date	Event	P	Score	P	Score	P	Score
Jul 27–30, 2016	(United States) 2016 Lake Placid IDI (Junior)	1	66.15	1	90.02	1	156.17
Sep 8–11, 2016	2016 JGP Japan	1	66.76	1	93.66	1	160.42
Oct 5–8, 2016	2016 JGP Germany	1	65.93	1	91.70	1	157.63
Dec 7–11, 2016	(France) 2016–17 Junior Grand Prix Final	2	66.91	1	95.59	1	162.50
Jan 14–22, 2017	(United States) 2017 U.S. Championships (Junior)	1	72.42	1	103.91	1	176.33
Mar 15–19, 2017	(Taiwan) 2017 World Junior Championships	2	67.29	1	97.54	1	164.83
