= 2018 CS Golden Spin of Zagreb =

- Type: ISU Challenger Series
- Date: December 5 – 8
- Season: 2018–19
- Location: Zagreb
- Host: Croatian Skating Federation
- Venue: Dom Sportova

Champions
- Men's singles: (United States) Jason Brown
- Ladies' singles: (United States) Bradie Tennell
- Pairs: (Russia) Alisa Efimova / Alexander Korovin
- Ice dance: (Canada) Piper Gilles / Paul Poirier
- Previous: 2017 CS Golden Spin of Zagreb
- Next: 2019 CS Golden Spin of Zagreb

The 2018 CS Golden Spin of Zagreb was held in December 2018 as part of the 2018–19 ISU Challenger Series. Medals were awarded in the disciplines of men's singles, ladies' singles, pair skating, and ice dancing.

== Entries ==
The International Skating Union published the list of entries on November 12, 2018.

Country	Men	Ladies	Pairs	Ice dance
Austria	Luc Maierhofer			
Azerbaijan		Morgan Flood; Ekaterina Ryabova		
Belarus				Anna Kublikova / Yuri Hulitski
Belgium		Charlotte Vandersarren		
Bulgaria		Simona Gospodinova		Mina Zdravkova / Christopher M. Davis
Canada				Piper Gilles / Paul Poirier
China		Chen Hongyi		
Croatia		Hana Cvijanović; Patricia Skopančić	Lana Petranović / Antonio Souza-Kordeiru	
Czech Republic	Georgii Reshtenko			
Estonia	Aleksandr Selevko			
Finland		Nelma Hede; Oona Ounasvuori		
France				Julia Wagret / Pierre Souquet
Georgia	Irakli Maysuradze			
Germany	Catalin Dimitrescu; Paul Fentz	Alissa Scheidt; Nicole Schott; Nathalie Weinzierl	Minerva Fabienne Hase / Nolan Seegert; Annika Hocke / Ruben Blommaert	Shari Koch / Christian Nüchtern; Katharina Müller / Tim Dieck
Hong Kong	Lap Kan Yuen	Hiu Ching Kwong		
Hungary				Beatrice Tomczak / Daniel Illes; Anna Yanovskaya / Ádám Lukács
Israel	Alexei Bychenko; Daniel Samohin	Elena Rivkina	Hailey Esther Kops / Artem Tsoglin	Shira Ichilov / Vadim Davidovich
Italy	Alessandro Fadini; Daniel Grassl	Elisabetta Leccardi		
Kazakhstan	Nikita Manko	Aiza Mambekova	Zhansaya Adykhanova / Abish Baytkanov	
Latvia	Deniss Vasiļjevs	Angelīna Kučvaļska		
Lithuania		Paulina Ramanauskaitė		
Mexico	Diego Saldana	Sofia del Rio; Andrea Montesinos Cantu		
Monaco	Davide Lewton Brain			
Netherlands	Thomas Kennes	Kyarha van Tiel; Niki Wories		
Philippines	Yamato Rowe	Alisson Krystle Perticheto		
Poland				Natalia Kaliszek / Maksym Spodyriev
Russia	Mikhail Kolyada; Alexander Samarin; Anton Shulepov	Anastasiia Gubanova; Anastasiia Guliakova; Maria Sotskova	Alisa Efimova / Alexander Korovin	Annabelle Morozov / Andrei Bagin; Betina Popova / Sergey Mozgov
Serbia		Antonina Dubinina		
Singapore	Chadwick Wang			
Slovakia		Nina Letenayova		
Slovenia		Daša Grm; Nina Polsak; Maruša Udrih		
South Africa		Kathryn Winstanley		
South Korea		Ji Min-ji		
Spain	Javier Raya			
Sweden	Alexander Majorov; Nikolai Majorov			
Switzerland		Noémie Bodenstein; Yasmine Kimiko Yamada		
United Kingdom	Luke Digby			Robynne Tweedale / Joseph Buckland
United States	Jason Brown	Mariah Bell; Bradie Tennell; Megan Wessenberg	Ashley Cain / Timothy LeDuc; Alexa Scimeca Knierim / Chris Knierim; Deanna Stellato-Dudek / Nathan Bartholomay	

=== Changes to preliminary assignments ===
Date	Discipline	Withdrew	Added	Reason/Other notes	Refs
November 12	Ladies	(Russia) Elizaveta Tuktamysheva	(Russia) Anastasiia Guliakova	Conflict with Grand Prix Final	
November 13	Men	(Russia) Konstantin Miliukov	(Russia) Andrei Lazukin		
November 13	Ladies	(Kazakhstan) Alana Toktarova		Not senior age eligible	
November 13	Ladies	(South Africa) Marion Papka			
November 13	Pairs	N/A	(Russia) Alisa Efimova / Alexander Korovin		
November 13	Ice dance	(Italy) Carolina Portesi Peroni / Michael Chrastecky	(Italy) Jasmine Tessari / Francesco Fioretti		
November 14	Pairs	(Netherlands) Liubov Efimenko / Dmitry Epstein			
November 15	Ladies	N/A	(Brazil) Isadora Williams		
November 15	Pairs	(China) Wang Xuehan / Wang Lei			
November 19	Men	(United States) Alexei Krasnozhon	(Georgia (country)) Irakli Maysuradze		
November 19	Ladies	(Israel) Netta Schreiber			
November 19	Pairs	(Czech Republic) Hanna Abrazhevich / Martin Bidař			
November 19	Pairs	(Russia) Amina Atakhanova / Nikita Volodin			
November 19	Ice dance	N/A	(Hungary) Anna Yanovskaya / Ádám Lukács		
November 21	Pairs	(Canada) Justine Brasseur / Mark Bardei			
November 21	Ice dance	(Lithuania) Allison Reed / Saulius Ambrulevičius			
November 23	Ladies	(Brazil) Isadora Williams			
November 23	Ladies	(Sweden) Anita Östlund			
November 26	Ice dance	(Russia) Victoria Sinitsina / Nikita Katsalapov	(Canada) Piper Gilles / Paul Poirier		
November 27	Ladies	(Austria) Alisa Stomakhina			
November 27	Ladies	(Russia) Anna Pogorilaya	(Russia) Maria Sotskova		
November 27	Men	(China) Fang Shuai			
November 27	Men	(Israel) Mark Gorodnitsky			
November 27	Men	(Russia) Andrei Lazukin	(Russia) Mikhail Kolyada		
November 30	Men	(Philippines) Christopher Caluza			
November 30	Men	(Russia) Maxim Kovtun	(Russia) Anton Shulepov		
December 3	Men	(Italy) Jari Kessler			
December 4	Ladies	(Estonia) Kristina Shkuleta-Gromova			
December 4	Ladies	(Lithuania) Elžbieta Kropa			
December 4	Pairs	(Italy) Giulia Foresti / Edoardo Caputo			
December 4	Ice dance	(Italy) Jasmine Tessari / Francesco Fioretti			

== Results ==
=== Men ===
Rank	Name	Nation	Total points	SP		FS	
1	Jason Brown	United States	263.42	2	95.50	1	167.92
2	Mikhail Kolyada	Russia	253.14	1	97.04	2	156.10
3	Alexander Samarin	Russia	237.84	3	86.29	3	151.55
4	Daniel Samohin	Israel	230.54	4	85.10	6	145.44
5	Daniel Grassl	Italy	229.82	6	82.35	4	147.47
6	Alexander Majorov	Sweden	227.47	5	83.87	7	143.60
7	Anton Shulepov	Russia	225.82	7	78.52	5	147.30
8	Paul Fentz	Germany	210.12	8	74.77	8	135.35
9	Irakli Maysuradze	Georgia	207.60	9	74.54	9	133.06
10	Alexei Bychenko	Israel	192.21	10	72.94	12	119.27
11	Aleksandr Selevko	Estonia	186.09	12	61.87	10	124.22
12	Catalin Dimitrescu	Germany	181.88	11	66.77	15	115.11
13	Davide Lewton Brain	Monaco	180.51	14	61.34	13	119.17
14	Nikolaj Majorov	Sweden	177.03	18	54.11	11	122.92
15	Alessandro Fadini	Italy	171.68	17	54.78	14	116.90
16	Luc Maierhofer	Austria	167.80	13	61.65	17	106.15
17	Javier Raya	Spain	164.71	15	59.39	18	105.32
18	Nikita Manko	Kazakhstan	161.59	16	57.28	19	104.31
19	Thomas Kennes	Netherlands	161.20	19	52.34	16	108.86
20	Georgii Reshtenko	Czech Republic	136.38	21	50.21	20	86.17
21	Yamato Rowe	Philippines	134.68	20	52.23	22	82.45
22	Chadwick Wang	Singapore	127.47	24	42.21	21	85.26
23	Lap Kan Yuen	Hong Kong	125.27	22	49.96	24	75.31
24	Diego Saldana	Mexico	119.63	23	44.21	23	75.42
WD	Deniss Vasiljevs	Latvia	withdrew	withdrew from competition			
WD	Luke Digby	United Kingdom	withdrew	withdrew from competition			

=== Ladies ===
Rank	Name	Nation	Total points	SP		FS	
1	Bradie Tennell	United States	202.41	1	71.50	1	130.91
2	Anastasiia Gubanova	Russia	198.65	2	69.56	2	129.09
3	Mariah Bell	United States	196.60	4	67.82	3	128.78
4	Anastasiia Guliakova	Russia	188.90	3	67.85	4	121.05
5	Maria Sotskova	Russia	179.72	5	60.35	5	119.37
6	Ekaterina Ryabova	Azerbaijan	171.10	7	57.28	6	113.82
7	Chen Hongyi	China	165.55	8	56.81	7	108.74
8	Yasmine Kimiko Yamada	Switzerland	164.48	6	58.78	8	105.90
9	Daša Grm	Slovenia	150.13	12	51.01	9	99.12
10	Nicole Schott	Germany	149.74	9	55.44	10	94.30
11	Alissa Scheidt	Germany	145.72	11	51.91	11	93.81
12	Megan Wessenberg	United States	144.79	10	53.23	13	91.56
13	Kyarha van Tiel	Netherlands	139.56	17	48.99	15	90.57
14	Paulina Ramanauskaite	Lithuania	138.79	16	49.14	16	89.65
15	Andrea Montesinos Cantu	Mexico	134.30	19	45.39	17	88.91
16	Niki Wories	Netherlands	132.73	24	39.32	12	93.41
17	Charlotte Vandersarren	Belgium	130.89	13	50.85	20	80.04
18	Antonina Dubinina	Serbia	130.36	14	50.47	21	79.89
19	Angelīna Kučvaļska	Latvia	129.12	25	38.39	14	90.73
20	Hana Cvijanovic	Croatia	126.25	20	44.56	18	81.69
21	Ji Min-ji	South Korea	124.79	15	49.15	24	75.64
22	Sofia del Rio	Mexico	123.80	21	43.45	19	80.35
23	Alisson Krystle Perticheto	Philippines	119.40	18	45.48	25	73.92
24	Aiza Mambekova	Kazakhstan	116.64	23	39.40	22	77.24
25	Oona Ounasvuori	Finland	114.65	22	42.52	26	72.13
26	Noemie Bodenstein	Switzerland	110.15	26	34.33	23	75.82
27	Hiu Ching Kwong	Hong Kong	103.68	31	31.95	27	71.73
28	Elena Rivkina	Israel	101.75	30	32.28	28	69.47
29	Nelma Hede	Finland	101.41	27	34.06	29	67.35
30	Marusa Udrih	Slovenia	99.32	29	33.01	30	66.31
31	Nina Letenayova	Slovakia	98.20	32	31.94	31	66.26
32	Simona Gospodinova	Bulgaria	93.14	28	33.28	32	59.86
33	Kathryn Winstanley	South Africa	86.88	33	31.19	34	55.69
34	Patricia Skopancic	Croatia	77.30	34	20.13	33	57.17
WD	Elisabetta Leccardi	Italy	withdrew	withdrew from competition			
WD	Julia Sauter	Romania	withdrew	withdrew from competition			
WD	Nina Polsak	Slovenia	withdrew	withdrew from competition			

=== Pairs ===
Rank	Name	Nation	Total points	SP		FS	
1	Alisa Efimova / Alexander Korovin	Russia	183.89	1	65.84	2	118.05
2	Alexa Scimeca Knierim / Chris Knierim	United States	182.84	3	64.04	1	118.80
3	Deanna Stellato-Dudek / Nathan Bartholomay	United States	176.44	5	60.12	3	116.32
4	Minerva Fabienne Hase / Nolan Seegert	Germany	172.18	4	62.97	4	109.21
5	Ashley Cain / Timothy LeDuc	United States	169.67	2	64.34	5	105.33
6	Annika Hocke / Ruben Blommaert	Germany	160.47	6	59.34	6	101.13
7	Lana Petranović / Antonio Souza-Kordeiru	Croatia	147.21	7	51.40	7	95.81
8	Hailey Esther Kops / Artem Tsoglin	Israel	132.72	8	46.71	8	86.01
9	Zhansaya Adykhanova / Abish Baytkanov	Kazakhstan	101.85	9	31.81	9	70.04

=== Ice dancing ===
Rank	Name	Nation	Total points	RD		FD	
1	Piper Gilles / Paul Poirier	Canada	201.27	1	79.80	1	121.47
2	Natalia Kaliszek / Maksym Spodyriev	Poland	170.11	2	66.06	2	104.05
3	Betina Popova / Sergey Mozgov	Russia	165.73	5	62.84	3	102.89
4	Shari Koch / Christian Nüchtern	Germany	165.31	3	65.70	4	99.61
5	Anna Yanovskaya / Ádám Lukács	Hungary	161.40	4	64.32	6	97.08
6	Robynne Tweedale / Joseph Buckland	United Kingdom	159.83	6	61.41	5	98.42
7	Katharina Müller / Tim Dieck	Germany	157.08	7	61.12	8	95.96
8	Annabelle Morozov / Andrei Bagin	Russia	151.55	10	54.51	7	97.04
9	Julia Wagret / Pierre Souquet	France	142.46	9	55.76	9	86.70
10	Shira Ichilov / Vadim Davidovich	Israel	139.45	8	57.10	11	82.35
11	Anna Kublikova / Yuri Hulitski	Belarus	137.98	11	52.55	10	85.43
WD	Mina Zdravkov / Christopher Martin Davis	Bulgaria	withdrew	withdrew from competition			
