= Brian Johnson (figure skater) =

American pair skater (born 1995)

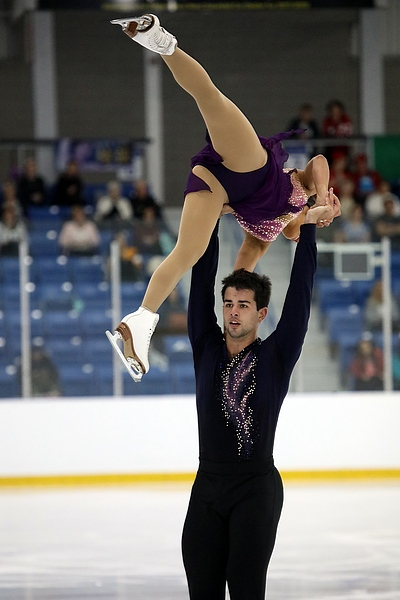
- Calalang and Johnson at the 2018 Autumn Classic International

Personal information
- Born: November 5, 1995 (age 31) Royal Oak, Michigan, U.S
- Home town: Northville, MI, U.S
- Height: 6 ft 1 in (1.85 m)

Figure skating career
- Country: United States
- Discipline: Pair skating
- Partner: Jessica Calalang (2018–22); Chelsea Liu (2014–18); Aya Takai (2013–14)
- Began skating: 2000
- Retired: April 3, 2022

Medal record
U.S. Championships
Silver medal – second place	2020 Greensboro	Pairs
Silver medal – second place	2021 Las Vegas	Pairs
Silver medal – second place	2022 Nashville	Pairs

Brian Johnson (born November 5, 1995) is a retired American pair skater. With Jessica Calalang, he is a three-time U.S. national silver medalist (2020–22) and a three-time Challenger series medalist, including gold at the 2019 CS Warsaw Cup.

Earlier in his career, he skated with Chelsea Liu, winning two medals on the ISU Challenger Series. They also competed together at one ISU Junior Grand Prix Final and two World Junior Championships.

== Personal life ==
Brian Johnson was born November 5, 1995, in Royal Oak, Michigan. His parents, James and Nancy, work in the automotive industry. In 2014, he graduated from Detroit Country Day School.

== Career ==
=== Early years ===
Johnson began skating in 2001. In the 2011–12 season, he competed with Caroline Yu, winning bronze on the intermediate level at the U.S. Junior Championships.

During the next two seasons, he competed with Aya Takai. The pair placed 11th at the 2014 World Junior Championships in Sofia, Bulgaria. They were coached by Jason Dungjen, Sergei Petrovski, Yuka Sato, and Linda Johns in Bloomfield Hills, Michigan.

=== Partnership with Liu ===
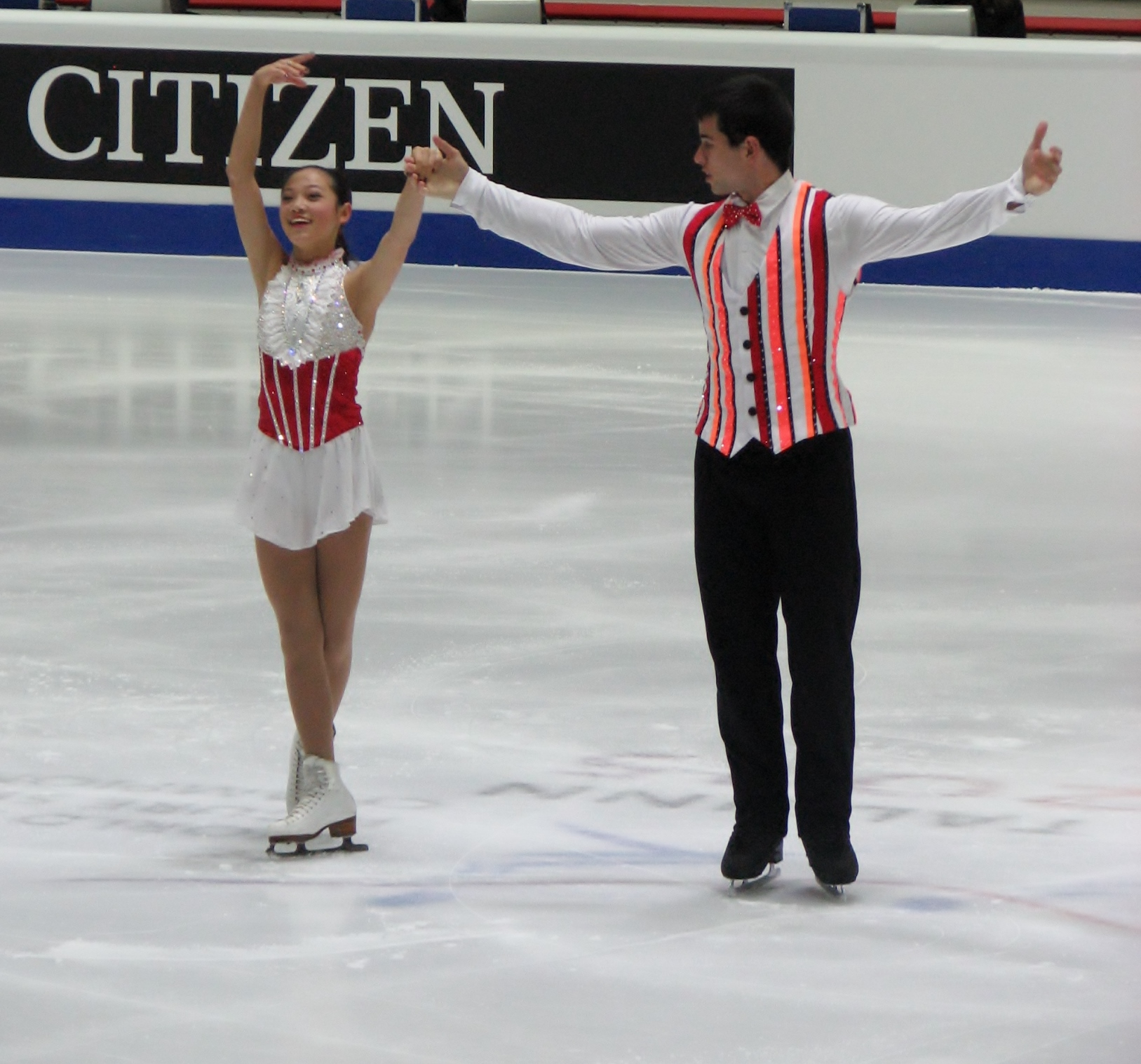
Liu / Johnson at the 2015 World Junior Championships

Johnson teamed up with Chelsea Liu in May 2014. They are coached by Todd Sand and Jenni Meno in Orange County, California.

During the 2014–15 JGP series, Liu/Johnson won a bronze medal in Dresden, Germany and placed fourth in Zagreb, Croatia. Their results gave them a spot at the 2014–15 JGP Final in Barcelona, Spain, where the pair finished sixth. After winning the junior silver medal at the 2015 U.S. Championships, they were assigned to the 2015 World Junior Championships in Tallinn, Estonia. The pair placed 5th in the short program, 8th in the free skate, and 7th overall.

Competing in the 2015–16 JGP series, Liu/Johnson placed 8th in Linz, Austria and 5th in Toruń, Poland. Ranked fifth in both segments, the pair finished fifth at the 2016 World Junior Championships in Debrecen, Hungary.

=== Partnership with Calalang ===
==== 2018–19 season ====
Johnson partnered with Jessica Calalang in early April 2018. They debuted internationally on the Challenger series at the 2018 CS Autumn Classic International, where they placed fourth. In November, they won bronze at the 2018 CS Tallinn Trophy.

Debuting at senior Nationals at the 2019 U.S. Championships, they placed fifth.

==== 2019–20 season ====
After placing sixth at the 2019 CS U.S. Classic, Calalang/Johnson were selected to make their Grand Prix debut, placing fourth at the 2019 Skate America and sixth at 2019 Skate Canada International. At Skate America, they placed ahead of reigning U.S. national champions Cain/LeDuc.

After competing at a second Challenger event, the 2019 CS Warsaw Cup, where they won the gold medal, Calalang/Johnson competed at the 2020 U.S. Championships. They were fourth in the short program after Johnson fell on a downgraded triple Salchow attempt. Skating cleanly in the free skate, they won that segment, receiving an ovation from the audience, and rose to the silver medal place. Johnson remarked that "the amount of audience support at the end of that program was overwhelming. It’s the most amazing thing I have felt on the ice."

Despite being national silver medalists, Calalang/Johnson were not assigned to one of the United States' two pairs berths at the 2020 World Championships in Montreal. Instead, they were sent to the 2020 Four Continents Championships in Seoul, where they placed fourth in the short program after Calalang stepped out of their side-by-side jump attempt. In the free skate, their sole error was Johnson singling a planned triple Salchow, and they placed third in the segment, winning a small bronze medal to finish in fourth place overall. Johnson commented afterward that they had "been together less than two years, but already we are in the last group at the Four Continents with Olympians. I have nothing but hope for the future."

After the sudden split of national champions Knierim and Knierim, Calalang and Johnson were added to the World Team. The event was later canceled due to the COVID-19 pandemic.

==== 2020–21 season ====
Calalang/Johnson were assigned to compete at the 2020 Skate America, with the Grand Prix operating largely based on training location due to pandemic travel restrictions. They placed second in the short program despite both making errors on their jumps. Second in the free skate as well with more jump errors, they won the silver medal behind the new team of Knierim/Frazier.

Competing at the 2021 U.S. Championships, Calalang/Johnson placed second in the short program after Calalang fell on her attempted triple Salchow jump, ending up 6.16 points behind Knerim/Frazier. The team struggled in the free skate, with Calalang again falling on what was intended as a jump combination and both making errors on their other triple jump, as well as receiving on a level 1 on their final lift. Despite this, they remained in second place, winning their second consecutive silver medal.

Calalang/Johnson were named to the American team for the 2021 World Championships in Stockholm, but later withdrew for what were initially announced as "personal reasons". Eight months later it was revealed that Calalang had tested positive for 4-CPA, a known metabolite of Meclofenoxate, a stimulant prohibited by the United States Anti-Doping Agency. As a result, their funding from the USFS was temporarily suspended. It was eventually determined that 4-CPA was also metabolized as a result of using various cosmetics and shampoos, and Calalang was cleared to return to competition.

==== 2021–22 season ====
Due to the suspension, Calalang/Johnson were not eligible to be assigned to any events on the Grand Prix apart from receiving a host spot at 2021 Skate America after being cleared. They made their debut at the Skating Club of Boston's Cranberry Cup event, winning the bronze medal, before placing fourth at the 2021 CS Finlandia Trophy.

Returning to the Grand Prix at the 2021 Skate America, they placed fourth in the short program with a clean skate, but fell to fifth after the free skate due to multiple jump errors. Calalang/Johnson then competed twice on the Challenger series, winning the silver medal at the 2021 CS Warsaw Cup and then placing sixth at the 2021 CS Golden Spin of Zagreb.

Defending national champions Knierim/Frazier were forced to withdraw from the 2022 U.S. Championships due to a positive COVID-19 test, but were still expected to be named to the American Olympic team. As a result, it was widely considered to be between Calalang/Johnson and Cain-Gribble/LeDuc for the second pairs berth on the team. Calalang/Johnson were narrowly second in the short program with a clean skate, but in the free skate both made jump errors in addition to a throw jump stepout, and they took the silver medal. Both expressed disappointment at the result, but Johnson added "after everything that's happened this year, we are both just so grateful to be here in front of an audience again. It's an experience that at the beginning of the year, we weren't sure we were going to have again."

Johnson announced his retirement from competitive skating on Instagram on April 3, 2022.

== Programs ==
=== With Calalang ===
Season	Short program	Free skating
2021–2022	Come Together by The Beatles performed by Gary Clark Jr. & Junkie XL choreo. by Benoit Richaud	Who Wants to Live Forever by Queen performed by The Tenors ft. Lindsey Stirling choreo. by Cindy Stuart
2020–2021	Light of the Seven (from Game of Thrones) by Ramin Djawadi choreo. by Benoit Richaud	Who Wants to Live Forever by Queen performed by The Tenors ft. Lindsey Stirling choreo. by Cindy Stuart
2019–2020	Light of the Seven (from Game of Thrones) by Ramin Djawadi choreo. by Benoit Richaud	You Are the Reason by Calum Scott, Leona Lewis choreo. by Cindy Stuart
2018–2019	Salsation by David Shire choreo. by Rohene Ward	Nocturnal Animals by Abel Korzeniowski choreo. by Rohene Ward

=== With Liu ===
Season	Short program	Free skating
2017–2018	Still Got the Blues by Gary Moore	Act III: Adagio of Spartacus and Phrygia (from Spartacus) by Aram Khachaturian, Michail Jurowski
2016–2017	The Way You Make Me Feel; Black or White by Michael Jackson	Beauty and the Beast by Alan Menken choreo. by Renée Roca
2015–2016	Tango de los Exilados by Walter Taieb, Vanessa-Mae choreo. by Pasquale Camerlengo	Beauty and the Beast by Alan Menken choreo. by Renée Roca
2014–2015	Mary Poppins by the Sherman Brothers choreo. by Christine Binder	Yellow River Piano Concerto: Prelude performed by Lang Lang choreo. by Christine Binder

=== With Takai ===
Season	Short program	Free skating
2013–2014	Jump Swing Blues by Rick Krive choreo. by Massimo Scali	Paganini Rhapsody by Niccolò Paganini arranged by David Garrett choreo. by Massimo Scali

== Competitive highlights ==
- GP – Event of the ISU Grand Prix Series
- JGP – Event of the ISU Junior Grand Prix Series
- CS – Event of the ISU Challenger Series
- C – Competition was cancelled
- WD – Withdrew from competition

=== Pair skating with Jessica Calalang ===
Competition placements at senior level
Season	2018–19	2019–20	2020–21	2021–22
World Championships		C	WD	
Four Continents Championships		4th		
U.S. Championships	5th	2nd	2nd	2nd
GP Skate America		4th	2nd	5th
GP Skate Canada		6th		
CS Autumn Classic	4th			
CS Finlandia Trophy				4th
CS Golden Spin of Zagreb				6th
CS Tallinn Trophy	3rd			
CS U.S. Classic		6th		
CS Warsaw Cup		1st		2nd
Cranberry Cup				3rd
John Nicks Challenge				2nd

=== Pair skating with Chelsea Liu ===
Competition placements at junior & senior level
Season	2014–15	2015–16	2016–17	2017–18
World Junior Championships	7th	5th	7th	
U.S. Championships	2nd J		6th S	7th S
Junior Grand Prix Final	6th			
CS U.S. Classic				3rd
CS Warsaw Cup			2nd	6th
JGP Austria		8th		
JGP Croatia	4th			
JGP Czech Republic			3rd	
JGP Estonia			5th	
JGP Germany	3rd			
JGP Poland		5th		

=== Pair skating with Aya Takai ===
Competition placements at junior level
Season	2013–14
World Junior Championships	11th
U.S. Championships	7th
Challenge Cup	2nd
