= Nathan Bartholomay =

American pair skater (born 1989)

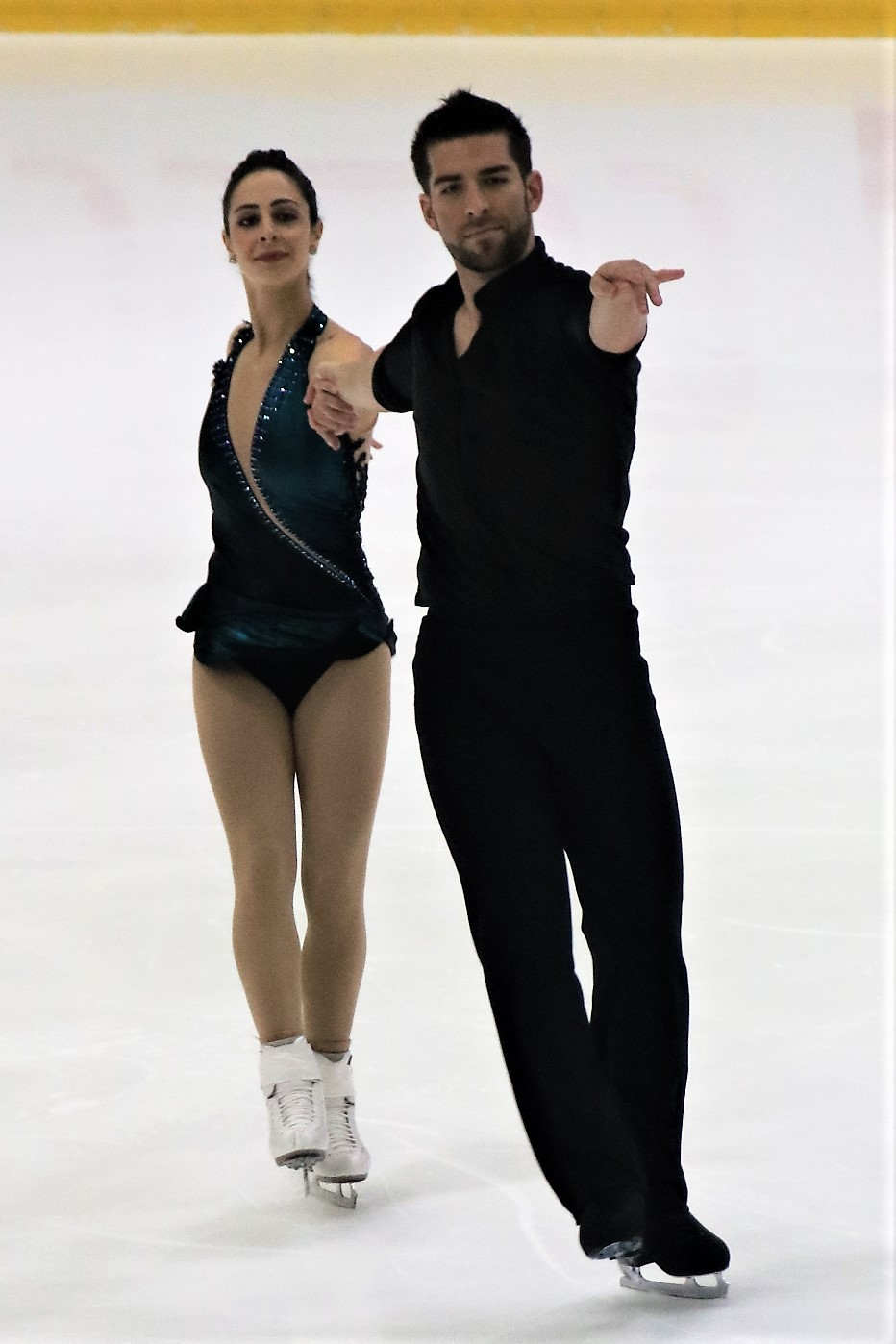
- Bartholomay and Stellato-Dudek at the 2018 Grand Prix of Helsinki

Personal information
- Born: May 18, 1989 (age 37) Newtown, Pennsylvania, U.S.
- Height: 5 ft 10 in (1.78 m)

Figure skating career
- Country: United States
- Discipline: Pair skating
- Partner: Katie McBeath (2020–23); Deanna Stellato (2016–19); Gretchen Donlan (2014–16); Felicia Zhang (2011–14)
- Skating club: Southwest Florida Figure Skating Club, Ellenton
- Began skating: 1997
- Retired: 2023

Medal record
U.S. Championships
Silver medal – second place	2014 Boston	Pairs
Bronze medal – third place	2013 Omaha	Pairs
Bronze medal – third place	2018 San Jose	Pairs
Bronze medal – third place	2019 Detroit	Pairs

Nathan Bartholomay (born May 18, 1989) is an American pair skater. With his former partner Deanna Stellato-Dudek, he is the 2018 Ondrej Nepela Trophy silver medalist, the 2018 Nebelhorn Trophy bronze medalist, and a two-time U.S. national bronze medalist (2018 and 2019).

With former partner Felicia Zhang, he is a two-time U.S. national medalist (silver in 2014, bronze in 2013) and competed at the 2014 Winter Olympics.

== Personal life ==
Bartholomay was born May 18, 1989, in Newtown, Pennsylvania. In 2010, he graduated from Laurel Springs High School.

== Career ==
=== Early years ===
Bartholomay began skating in 1997. He first tried pairs around 2003. Early in his career, he skated with Erica Choi Smith and Meg Byrne.

=== Partnership with Zhang ===
Bartholomay teamed up with Felicia Zhang in May 2011. They were coached by Jim Peterson and Lyndon Johnston at the Ice and Sports Complex in Ellenton, Florida. In their first season, they placed eighth at the U.S. Championships.

Zhang/Bartholomay won bronze at the 2013 U.S. Championships and were assigned to the 2013 Four Continents Championships, where they placed fourth.

In the 2013–14 season, Zhang/Bartholomay received two Grand Prix assignments; they finished seventh at the 2013 Skate America and sixth at the 2013 Cup of China. After winning the silver medal at the 2014 U.S. Championships, ahead of Caydee Denney / John Coughlin, they were named to the U.S. team for the Olympics and listed as first alternates for the World Championships. Zhang/Bartholomay finished 12th at the 2014 Winter Olympics in Sochi. They were called up to replace the injured Denney/Coughlin at the 2014 World Championships, where they finished 14th. They announced the end of their partnership on July 16, 2014.

=== Partnership with Donlan ===
In July 2014, Bartholomay teamed up with Gretchen Donlan. In late October, he underwent surgery to repair a disc and remove bone spurs in his ankle, causing the pair to withdraw from their first assignment, the 2014 CS Ice Challenge. They placed seventh at the 2015 U.S. Championships and concluded their first season with gold at the International Challenge Cup.

In the 2015–16 season, Donlan/Bartholomay appeared at two Challenger Series events, placing fifth at the 2015 U.S. Classic and sixth at the Ondrej Nepela Trophy. They withdrew from their Grand Prix assignment, the 2015 Skate America, after Donlan fell ill with a severe flu. She developed labyrinthitis in her right ear, resulting in vertigo that kept her off the ice for three months and forced the pair to withdraw from the 2016 U.S. Championships. The pair announced the end of their partnership in March 2016. They were coached by Jim Peterson in Ellenton, Florida.

=== Partnership with Stellato-Dudek ===
After unsuccessful tryouts with other skaters, Bartholomay was considering a coaching career. U.S. Figure Skating's high-performance director, Mitch Moyer, suggested a tryout with Deanna Stellato, a former single skater who was visiting the rink at which Bartholomay was working. In July 2016, Stellato and Bartholomay announced that they had formed a partnership and were based at the Ellenton Ice and Sports Complex. Coached by Jim Peterson, they train on ice three hours a day, five days a week.

Making their international debut together, the pair placed 6th at the 2016 CS Golden Spin of Zagreb. After taking the gold medal at the Eastern Sectional Championships, they qualified for the 2017 U.S. Championships. The pair placed third at the 2018 U.S. Championships. They placed fifth at the 2018 Four Continents Championships.

Stellato-Dudek/Bartholomay opened the 2018–19 figure skating season with two Challenger events, winning silver at the Nepela Trophy and bronze at Nebelhorn Trophy. They placed sixth at the 2018 Grand Prix of Helsinki and had to withdraw from the 2018 Rostelecom Cup. Competing in a third Challenger event, they won another bronze medal at the 2018 CS Golden Spin of Zagreb. Stellato-Dudek/Bartholomay won a second consecutive bronze medal at the 2019 U.S. Championships. However, due to perceived inconsistent results earlier in the season, they were not assigned to the third American berth at the 2019 Four Continents Championships, that going instead to pewter medalists Tarah Kayne / Danny O'Shea. Stellato-Dudek and Bartholomay parted ways after the 2018-2019 figure skating season.

=== Partnership with McBeath ===
At the end of May 2020, Bartholomay announced that he had teamed up with Katie McBeath and had started training in Irvine, California under Jenni Meno, Todd Sand, Christine Binder, and Chris Knierim. They made their debut as a pair as at the virtual ISP Points Challenge where they were seventh. They also placed seventh at their debut as a pair at the 2021 U.S. Championships.

McBeath/Bartholomay placed 7th in their international debut at the 2021 Cranberry Cup and then debuted on the Challenger series at the 2021 CS Autumn Classic International, finishing 5th. They placed 5th at the 2022 U.S. Championships and then went on to finish 5th at the 2022 Four Continents.

During the 2022–23 figure skating season, McBeath/Bartholomay placed 6th at the 2022 MK John Wilson Trophy, 6th at the 2022 CS Golden Spin of Zagreb, and 6th at the 2023 U.S. Championships. In spring 2023, Bartholomay retired from competitive figure skating due to a back injury.

== Programs ==
=== With McBeath ===
Season	Short program	Free skating
2022–2023	Your Heart is as Black as Night by Beth Hart, Joe Bonamassa choreo. by Renée Roca	The Blower's Daughter by Damien Rice performed by Christina Aguilera and Chris Mann choreo. by Cindy Stuart
2021–2022	Leave a Light On by Tom Walker choreo. by Renée Roca	The Blower's Daughter by Damien Rice performed by Christina Aguilera and Chris Mann choreo. by Cindy Stuart
2020–2021	Cry Me a River by Arthur Hamilton performed by Michael Bublé	Arrival of the Birds by London Metropolitan Orchestra; Turning Page by Sleeping at Last

=== With Stellato-Dudek ===
Season	Short program	Free skating
2018–2019	Somewhere by Barbra Streisand; La cumparsita by Forever Tango	Run To You; I Have Nothing by Whitney Houston
2017–2018	Hallelujah by The Tenors; Eleanor Rigby by John Lennon and Paul McCartney	Where the Streets Have No Name; One by U2
2016–2017	The Tenors medley	The Firebird by Igor Stravinsky

=== With Donlan ===
Season	Short program	Free skating
2015–2016	All That Jazz by John Kander and Fred Ebb	Medley by Frank Sinatra
2014–2015	Dear Father by Neil Diamond	Clair de lune by Claude Debussy

=== With Zhang ===
Season	Short program	Free skating	Exhibition
2013–2014	Carousel Waltz by Rodgers and Hammerstein	Les Misérables by Claude-Michel Schönberg	
2012–2013	Theme from Cocoon by James Horner	West Side Story by Leonard Bernstein	One Hand, One Heart (from West Side Story) by Leonard Bernstein
2011–2012	Piano Concerto by George Gershwin	Concierto de Aranjuez by Joaquín Rodrigo	

== Competitive highlights ==
- GP – Event of the ISU Grand Prix Series
- JGP – Event of the ISU Junior Grand Prix Series
- CS – Event of the ISU Challenger Series
- WD – Withdrew from competition

=== Pair skating with Katie McBeath ===
Competition placements at senior level
Season	2020–21	2021–22	2022–23
Four Continents Championships		5th	
U.S. Championships	7th	5th	6th
GP Wilson Trophy			6th
CS Autumn Classic		5th	
CS Golden Spin of Zagreb			6th
Cranberry Cup		7th	
John Nicks Challenge		8th	

=== Pair skating with Deanna Stellato ===
Competition placements at senior level
Season	2016–17	2017–18	2018–19
World Championships		17th	
Four Continents Championships		5th	
U.S. Championships	4th	3rd	3rd
GP Finland			6th
GP Rostelecom Cup			WD
GP Skate America		8th	
CS Finlandia Trophy		6th	
CS Golden Spin of Zagreb	6th		3rd
CS Nebelhorn Trophy			3rd
CS Ondrej Nepela Trophy			2nd
CS U.S. Classic		6th	

=== Pair skating with Gretchen Donlan ===
Competition placements at senior level
Season	2014–15	2015–16
U.S. Championships	7th	
CS Ondrej Nepela Trophy		6th
CS U.S. Classic		5th
Challenge Cup	1st	

=== Pair skating with Felicia Zhang ===
Competition placements at senior level
Season	2011–12	2012–13	2013–14
Winter Olympics			12th
World Championships			14th
Four Continents Championships		4th	
U.S. Championships	8th	3rd	2nd
GP Cup of China			6th
GP Skate America			7th
U.S. Classic		4th	7th

=== Pair skating with Erika Smith ===
Competition placements at junior/senior level
Season	2008–09	2009–10	2010–11
U.S. Championships	11th J	3rd J	12th S
Golden Spin of Zagreb			4th S

=== Pair skating with Meg Byrne ===
Competition placements at junior level
Season	2006–07	2007–08
U.S. Championships	6th	5th
JGP United States		9th

== Detailed results ==
=== With McBeath ===
Current personal best scores are highlighted in bold.

**2022–23 season**
Date	Event	SP	FS	Total
January 23–29, 2023	2023 U.S. Championships	6; 59.96	5; 115.78	6; 172.74
December 7–10, 2022	2022 CS Golden Spin of Zagreb	5; **60.68**	6; 102.13	6; 162.81
November 11–13, 2022	2022 MK John Wilson Trophy	5; 57.21	7; 90.08	6; 147.29
**2021–22 season**
Date	Event	SP	FS	Total
January 18–23, 2022	2022 Four Continents Championships	4; 59.54	5; 108.64	5; 168.18
January 3–9, 2022	2022 U.S. Championships	6; 50.11	4; 116.99	5; 167.10
September 16–18, 2021	2021 CS Autumn Classic International	5; 56.60	4; **112.01**	5; **168.61**
September 9–10, 2021	2021 John Nicks Pairs Challenge	7; 56.41	8; 105.28	8; 161.69
August 11–15, 2021	2021 Cranberry Cup International	7; 52.13	6; 105.61	7; 157.74
**2020–21 season**
Date	Event	SP	FS	Total
January 11–21, 2021	2021 U.S. Championships	7; 58.23	7; 105.50	7; 163.73

=== Pair skating with Deanna Stellato ===
ISU personal best scores in the +5/-5 GOE System
Segment	Type	Score	Event
Total	**TSS**	**176.44**	2018 CS Golden Spin of Zagreb
Short program	**TSS**	**60.12**	2018 CS Golden Spin of Zagreb
Short program	TES	32.32	2018 CS Golden Spin of Zagreb
Short program	PCS	28.36	2018 CS Ondrej Nepela Trophy
Free skating	**TSS**	**116.72**	2018 CS Nebelhorn Trophy
Free skating	TES	58.92	2018 CS Golden Spin of Zagreb
Free skating	PCS	58.72	2018 CS Ondrej Nepela Trophy

ISU personal best scores in the +3/-3 GOE System
Segment	Type	Score	Event
Total	**TSS**	**178.38**	2018 Four Continents Championships
Short program	**TSS**	**61.48**	2018 World Championships
Short program	TES	34.15	2018 Four Continents Championships
Short program	PCS	28.37	2018 World Championships
Free skating	**TSS**	**117.45**	2018 Four Continents Championships
Free skating	TES	62.13	2018 Four Continents Championships
Free skating	PCS	56.32	2018 Four Continents Championships

- At national events in the United States, pewter medals are awarded for fourth place.

Results in the 2016–17 season
Date	Event	SP		FS		Total	
Date	Event	P	Score	P	Score	P	Score
Dec 7–10, 2016	(Croatia) 2016 CS Golden Spin of Zagreb	8	48.14	5	102.62	6	150.76
Jan 14–22, 2017	(United States) 2017 U.S. Championships	3	65.04	5	108.46	4	173.50

Results in the 2017–18 season
Date	Event	SP		FS		Total	
Date	Event	P	Score	P	Score	P	Score
Sep 13–16, 2017	(United States) 2017 U.S. International Classic	4	58.24	7	107.12	6	165.36
Oct 6–8, 2017	(Finland) 2017 CS Finlandia Trophy	7	50.90	6	110.27	6	161.17
Nov 24–26, 2017	(United States) 2017 Skate America	8	57.18	8	107.82	8	165.00
Jan 3–7, 2018	(United States) 2018 U.S. Championships	3	67.84	3	129.81	3	197.65
Jan 22–28, 2018	(Taiwan) 2018 Four Continents Championships	6	60.93	4	117.45	5	178.38
Mar 19–25, 2018	(Italy) 2018 World Championships	17	61.48	–	–	17	61.48

Results in the 2018–19 season
Date	Event	SP		FS		Total	
Date	Event	P	Score	P	Score	P	Score
Sep 19–22, 2018	(Slovakia) 2018 CS Ondrej Nepela Trophy	3	59.60	2	115.18	3	174.78
Sep 26–29, 2018	(Germany) 2018 CS Nebelhorn Trophy	3	58.19	2	116.72	3	174.91
Nov 2–4, 2018	(Finland) 2018 Grand Prix of Helsinki	6	56.44	6	102.77	6	159.21
Nov 16–18, 2018	(Russia) 2018 Rostelecom Cup	8	51.25	–	–	–	WD
Dec 5–8, 2018	(Croatia) 2018 CS Golden Spin of Zagreb	5	60.12	3	116.32	3	176.44
Jan 19–27, 2019	(United States) 2019 U.S. Championships	4	68.18	3	131.74	3	199.92
