= Jessica Calalang =

American pair skater (born 1995)

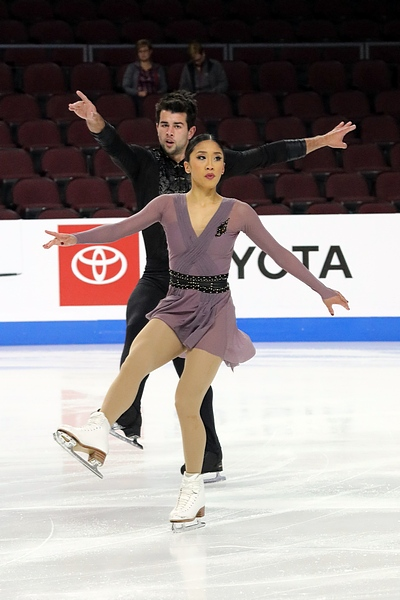
- Calalang and Johnson at 2019 Skate America

Personal information
- Full name: Jessica Noelle Calalang
- Born: February 24, 1995 (age 31) Elk Grove Village, Illinois, U.S.
- Home town: Irvine, California, U.S.
- Height: 5 ft 1 in (1.55 m)

Figure skating career
- Country: United States
- Discipline: Pair skating
- Partner: Brian Johnson (2018–22); Zack Sidhu (2010–18)
- Coach: Todd Sand; Jenni Meno; Christine Binder; Nina Mozer
- Skating club: DuPage Figure Skating Club, Buffalo Grove
- Began skating: 2000

Medal record
U.S. Championships
Silver medal – second place	2020 Greensboro	Pairs
Silver medal – second place	2021 Las Vegas	Pairs
Silver medal – second place	2022 Nashville	Pairs

Jessica Noelle Calalang (born February 24, 1995) is an American pair skater. With her current partner Brian Johnson, she is a three-time U.S. national silver medalist (2020–22) and a three-time Challenger series medalist, including gold at the 2019 CS Warsaw Cup. Earlier in her career, she skated with Zack Sidhu, winning three medals on the ISU Challenger Series.

== Personal life ==
Jessica Noelle Calalang was born on February 24, 1995, in Elk Grove Village, Illinois. After graduating in 2013 from Glenbrook South High School in Glenview, Illinois, she enrolled at Saddleback College in Mission Viejo, California.

== Career ==
In the 2009–10 season, Calalang competed with Daniel O'Shea on the novice level.

=== Partnership with Sidhu ===
Calalang teamed up with Zack Sidhu in August 2010. They made their ISU Junior Grand Prix debut at the 2010 JGP event in Ostrava, Czech Republic. The following season, they won a bronze medal at the 2011 JGP competition in Tallinn, Estonia. After winning the junior silver medal at the 2013 U.S. Championships, they were assigned to the 2013 World Junior Championships in Milan, Italy, where they finished ninth.

Calalang/Sidhu moved up to the senior level in the 2013–14 season. They won silver at the 2013 International Cup of Nice but finished 11th at the 2014 U.S. Championships. The pair began the following season on the ISU Challenger Series, winning silver at the 2014 U.S. International Classic and bronze at the 2014 Skate Canada Autumn Classic, before making their Grand Prix debut at the 2014 Cup of China.

=== Partnership with Johnson ===
==== 2018–19 season ====
Calalang partnered with Brian Johnson in early April 2018. They debuted internationally on the Challenger series at the 2018 CS Autumn Classic International, where they placed fourth. In November, they won bronze at the 2018 CS Tallinn Trophy.

Debuting at senior Nationals at the 2019 U.S. Championships, they placed fifth.

==== 2019–20 season ====
After placing sixth at the 2019 CS U.S. Classic, Calalang/Johnson were selected to make their Grand Prix debut, placing fourth at the 2019 Skate America and sixth at 2019 Skate Canada International. At Skate America, they placed ahead of reigning U.S. national champions Cain/LeDuc.

After competing at a second Challenger event, the 2019 CS Warsaw Cup, where they won the gold medal, Calalang/Johnson competed at the 2020 U.S. Championships. They were fourth in the short program after Johnson fell on a downgraded triple Salchow attempt. Skating cleanly in the free skate, they won that segment, receiving an ovation from the audience, and rose to the silver medal place. Johnson remarked that "the amount of audience support at the end of that program was overwhelming. It’s the most amazing thing I have felt on the ice."

Despite being national silver medalists, Calalang/Johnson were not assigned to one of the United States' two pairs berths at the 2020 World Championships in Montreal. Instead, they were sent to the 2020 Four Continents Championships in Seoul, where they placed fourth in the short program after Calalang stepped out of their side-by-side jump attempt. In the free skate, their sole error was Johnson singling a planned triple Salchow, and they placed third in the segment, winning a small bronze medal to finish in fourth place overall. Johnson commented afterward that they had "been together less than two years, but already we are in the last group at the Four Continents with Olympians. I have nothing but hope for the future."

After the sudden split of national champions Knierim and Knierim, Calalang and Johnson were added to the world team. The event was later canceled due to the COVID-19 pandemic.

==== 2020–21 season ====
Calalang/Johnson were assigned to compete at the 2020 Skate America, with the Grand Prix operating largely based on training location due to pandemic travel restrictions. They placed second in the short program despite both making errors on their jumps. Second in the free skate as well with more jump errors, they won the silver medal behind the new team of Knierim/Frazier.

Competing at the 2021 U.S. Championships, Calalang/Johnson placed second in the short program after Calalang fell on her attempted triple Salchow jump, ending up 6.16 points behind Knerim/Frazier. The team struggled in the free skate, with Calalang again falling on what was intended as a jump combination and both making errors on their other triple jump, as well as receiving on a level 1 on their final lift. Despite this, they remained in second place, winning their second consecutive silver medal.

===== Doping =====
Calalang/Johnson were named to the American team for the 2021 World Championships in Stockholm, but later withdrew for what were initially announced as "personal reasons". Eight months later it was revealed that Calalang had tested positive for 4-CPA, a known metabolite of Meclofenoxate, a stimulant prohibited by the United States Anti-Doping Agency. As a result, their funding from the USFS was temporarily suspended. It was eventually determined that 4-CPA was also metabolized as a result of using various cosmetics and shampoos, and Calalang was cleared to return to competition.

==== 2021–22 season ====
Due to the suspension, Calalang/Johnson were not eligible to be assigned to any events on the Grand Prix apart from receiving a host spot at 2021 Skate America after being cleared. They made their debut at the Skating Club of Boston's Cranberry Cup event, winning the bronze medal, before placing fourth at the 2021 CS Finlandia Trophy.

Returning to the Grand Prix at the 2021 Skate America, they placed fourth in the short program with a clean skate, but fell to fifth after the free skate due to multiple jump errors. Calalang/Johnson then competed twice on the Challenger series, winning the silver medal at the 2021 CS Warsaw Cup and then placing sixth at the 2021 CS Golden Spin of Zagreb.

Defending national champions Knierim/Frazier were forced to withdraw from the 2022 U.S. Championships due to a positive COVID-19 test, but were still expected to be named to the American Olympic team. As a result, it was widely considered to be between Calalang/Johnson and Cain-Gribble/LeDuc for the second pairs berth on the team. Calalang/Johnson were narrowly second in the short program with a clean skate, but in the free skate both made jump errors in addition to a throw jump stepout, and they took the silver medal. Both expressed disappointment at the result, but Johnson added "after everything that's happened this year, we are both just so grateful to be here in front of an audience again. It's an experience that at the beginning of the year, we weren't sure we were going to have again."

Their partnership ended when Johnson announced his retirement from competitive skating on Instagram on April 3, 2022.

== Programs ==
=== With Johnson ===
Season	Short program	Free skating
2021–2022	Come Together by The Beatles performed by Gary Clark Jr. & Junkie XL choreo. by Benoit Richaud	Who Wants to Live Forever by Queen performed by The Tenors ft. Lindsey Stirling choreo. by Cindy Stuart
2020–2021	Light of the Seven (from Game of Thrones) by Ramin Djawadi choreo. by Benoit Richaud	Who Wants to Live Forever by Queen performed by The Tenors ft. Lindsey Stirling choreo. by Cindy Stuart
2019–2020	Light of the Seven (from Game of Thrones) by Ramin Djawadi choreo. by Benoit Richaud	You Are the Reason by Calum Scott, Leona Lewis choreo. by Cindy Stuart
2018–2019	Salsation by David Shire choreo. by Rohene Ward	Nocturnal Animals by Abel Korzeniowski choreo. by Rohene Ward

=== With Sidhu ===
Season	Short program	Free skating	Exhibition
2017–2018	Kiss by Prince	Carmen Suite by Rodion Shchedrin	
2016–2017	The Prayer performed by Andrea Bocelli, Celine Dion	Carmen Suite by Rodion Shchedrin	
2015–2016	It's a Man's Man's Man's World performed by Seal	Romeo and Juliet by Nino Rota	
2014–2015	My One and Only by George Gershwin	Romeo and Juliet by Nino Rota	All of Me by John Legend
2013–2014	Hernando's Hideaway by Richard Adler and Jerry Ross	The Beatles Concerto by John Rutter	
2012–2013	Elite Syncopations by Scott Joplin	The Artist by Ludovic Bource	
2011–2012	Elite Syncopations by Scott Joplin	Miss Saigon by Claude-Michel Schönberg	Peace, Love, and Happiness by G. Love & Special Sauce
2010–2011	Summertime by George Gershwin	Adagio (from Spartacus) by Aram Khachaturian, the Armenian Philharmonic Orchestra	

== Competitive highlights ==
- GP – Event of the ISU Grand Prix Series
- JGP – Event of the ISU Junior Grand Prix Series
- CS – Event of the ISU Challenger Series
- C – Competition was cancelled
- WD – Withdrew from competition

=== Pair skating with Brian Johnson ===
Event	18–19	19–20	20–21	21–22
World Champs		C	WD	
Four Continents		4th		
GP Skate America		4th	2nd	5th
GP Skate Canada		6th		
CS Autumn Classic	4th			
CS Finlandia Trophy				4th
CS Golden Spin				6th
CS Tallinn Trophy	3rd			
CS U.S. Classic		6th		
CS Warsaw Cup		1st		2nd
Cranberry Cup				3rd
John Nicks Challenge				2nd
U.S. Championships	5th	2nd	2nd	2nd

=== Pair skating with Zack Sidhu ===
Event	10–11	11–12	12–13	13–14	14–15	15–16	16–17	17–18
GP Cup of China					7th			
GP Rostelecom					5th			
GP NHK Trophy						7th		
CS Autumn Classic					3rd			6th
CS Finlandia								7th
CS Ice Challenge						4th		
CS U.S. Classic					2nd		2nd	
Cup of Nice				2nd				
Junior Worlds			9th					
JGP Austria			6th					
JGP Croatia			8th					
JGP Czech Rep.	10th							
JGP Estonia		3rd						
JGP Poland		4th						
U.S. Champ.	8th J	4th J	2nd J	11th	5th	5th	WD	9th
