= 2018 CS Nebelhorn Trophy =

- Type: ISU Challenger Series
- Date: September 26 – 29
- Season: 2018–19
- Location: Oberstdorf
- Host: German Ice Skating Union
- Venue: Eissportzentrum Oberstdorf

Champions
- Men's singles: (Canada) Keegan Messing
- Ladies' singles: (Russia) Alina Zagitova
- Pairs: (Russia) Alisa Efimova / Alexander Korovin
- Ice dance: (Canada) Piper Gilles / Paul Poirier
- Previous: 2017 CS Nebelhorn Trophy
- Next: 2019 CS Nebelhorn Trophy

The 2018 CS Nebelhorn Trophy was held in September 2018 at the Eissportzentrum Oberstdorf. It is part of the 2018–19 ISU Challenger Series. Medals were awarded in the disciplines of men's singles, ladies' singles, pair skating, and ice dance.

== Entries ==
The International Skating Union published the list of entries on August 28, 2018.

Country	Men	Ladies	Pairs	Ice dance
Australia		Brooklee Han		
Austria		Natalie Klotz		
Belgium		Loena Hendrickx		
Canada	Keegan Messing	Alaine Chartrand	Evelyn Walsh / Trennt Michaud	Piper Gilles / Paul Poirier
Chinese Taipei		Amy Lin		
Croatia			Lana Petranović / Antonio Souza-Kordeiru	
Finland	Valtter Virtanen			
Germany	Paul Fentz; Thomas Stoll	Nathalie Weinzierl	Minerva Fabienne Hase / Nolan Seegert	Shari Koch / Christian Nüchtern; Katharina Müller / Tim Dieck; Jennifer Urban / Benjamin Steffan
Israel	Daniel Samohin	Netta Schreiber		
Italy			Rebecca Ghilardi / Filippo Ambrosini	
Japan		Marin Honda; Mai Mihara		
Philippines		Alisson Krystle Perticheto		
Poland				Natalia Kaliszek / Maksym Spodyriev
Russia	Artur Dmitriev	Alina Zagitova	Alisa Efimova / Alexander Korovin	
Sweden	Alexander Majorov	Matilda Algotsson		
Switzerland			Ioulia Chtchetinina / Mikhail Akulov	
Ukraine				Alexandra Nazarova / Maxim Nikitin
United Kingdom				Lilah Fear / Lewis Gibson
United States	Timothy Dolensky; Alexei Krasnozhon	Mariah Bell; Ashley Lin	Audrey Lu / Misha Mitrofanov; Alexa Scimeca Knierim / Chris Knierim; Deanna Stellato / Nathan Bartholomay	Christina Carreira / Anthony Ponomarenko; Rachel Parsons / Michael Parsons

=== Changes to preliminary assignments ===
Date	Discipline	Withdrew	Added	Reason/Other notes	Refs
September 4	Men	N/A	(Finland) Valtter Virtanen		
September 4	Pairs	N/A	(Germany) Annika Hocke / Ruben Blommaert		
September 10	Men	N/A	(United States) Timothy Dolensky		
September 11	Pairs	(United States) Jessica Pfund / Joshua Santillan	(United States) Audrey Lu / Misha Mitrofanov		
September 12	Ladies	(Germany) Lea Johanna Dastich	N/A		
September 12	Ladies	(Germany) Nicole Schott	N/A		
September 12	Ice dance	(United Kingdom) Robynne Tweedale / Joseph Buckland	N/A		
September 19	Pairs	(Germany) Annika Hocke / Ruben Blommaert	(Italy) Rebecca Ghilardi / Filippo Ambrosini		
September 20	Ladies	(Australia) Amelia Scarlett Jackson	(Russia) Alina Zagitova		
September 21	Pairs	N/A	(United States) Deanna Stellato / Nathan Bartholomay		
September 24	Ladies	(Finland) Emmi Peltonen	N/A		
September 25	Men	(Switzerland) Nicola Todeschini	N/A		
September 26	Ladies	(Estonia) Gerli Liinamäe	N/A		

== Records ==
The following new ISU best scores were set during this competition:

Event	Component	Skater(s)	Score	Date	Ref
Ladies	Short program	(Russia) Alina Zagitova	79.93	27 September 2018	
Ladies	Free skating	(Russia) Alina Zagitova	158.50	28 September 2018	
Ladies	Total score	(Russia) Alina Zagitova	238.43	28 September 2018	

== Results ==
=== Men ===
Rank	Name	Nation	Total points	SP		FS	
1	Keegan Messing	Canada	257.16	1	90.63	1	166.53
2	Alexander Majorov	Sweden	226.64	3	78.86	2	147.78
3	Artur Dmitriev	Russia	225.31	2	81.06	3	144.25
4	Timothy Dolensky	United States	209.02	5	67.80	4	141.22
5	Alexei Krasnozhon	United States	194.10	6	67.32	5	126.78
6	Daniel Samohin	Israel	189.03	4	71.60	6	117.43
7	Valtter Virtanen	Finland	162.85	7	58.29	8	104.56
8	Thomas Stoll	Germany	160.08	8	52.68	7	107.43
WD	Paul Fentz	Germany	withdrew	withdrew from competition			

=== Ladies ===
Rank	Name	Nation	Total points	SP		FS	
1	Alina Zagitova	Russia	238.43	1	79.93	1	158.50
2	Mai Mihara	Japan	209.22	3	70.94	2	138.28
3	Loena Hendrickx	Belgium	204.16	2	71.50	3	132.66
4	Mariah Bell	United States	188.97	4	70.02	6	118.95
5	Ashley Lin	United States	181.21	5	59.45	5	121.76
6	Marin Honda	Japan	178.89	7	56.66	4	122.23
7	Nathalie Weinzierl	Germany	157.45	6	57.53	7	99.92
8	Alaine Chartrand	Canada	150.02	8	53.60	8	96.42
9	Brooklee Han	Australia	140.81	9	49.71	9	91.10
10	Natalie Klotz	Austria	134.59	12	46.40	10	88.19
11	Amy Lin	Chinese Taipei	129.78	10	47.13	11	82.65
12	Matilda Algotsson	Sweden	121.46	11	46.87	12	74.59
13	Netta Schreiber	Israel	109.04	13	37.83	13	71.21
WD	Alisson Krystle Perticheto	Philippines	withdrew	withdrew from competition			

=== Pairs ===
Rank	Name	Nation	Total points	SP		FS	
1	Alisa Efimova / Alexander Korovin	Russia	178.94	4	56.42	1	122.52
2	Alexa Scimeca Knierim / Chris Knierim	United States	177.22	1	61.73	3	115.49
3	Deanna Stellato / Nathan Bartholomay	United States	174.91	3	58.19	2	116.72
4	Minerva Fabienne Hase / Nolan Seegert	Germany	161.61	2	58.27	6	103.34
5	Audrey Lu / Misha Mitrofanov	United States	157.22	6	49.47	4	107.75
6	Rebecca Ghilardi / Filippo Ambrosini	Italy	155.39	8	47.71	5	107.68
7	Evelyn Walsh / Trennt Michaud	Canada	153.71	5	51.85	7	101.86
8	Lana Petranović / Antonio Souza-Kordeiru	Croatia	144.02	7	49.28	8	94.74
9	Ioulia Chtchetinina / Mikhail Akulov	Switzerland	126.17	9	40.93	9	85.24

=== Ice dance ===
Rank	Name	Nation	Total points	RD		FD	
1	Piper Gilles / Paul Poirier	Canada	194.12	1	77.40	1	116.72
2	Rachel Parsons / Michael Parsons	United States	180.95	2	70.02	2	110.93
3	Christina Carreira / Anthony Ponomarenko	United States	177.49	3	69.56	3	107.93
4	Lilah Fear / Lewis Gibson	United Kingdom	160.61	6	57.30	4	103.31
5	Shari Koch / Christian Nüchtern	Germany	152.68	4	60.11	6	92.57
6	Jennifer Urban / Benjamin Steffan	Germany	150.73	7	56.91	5	93.82
7	Katharina Müller / Tim Dieck	Germany	147.15	5	57.82	7	89.33
8	Natalia Kaliszek / Maksym Spodyriev	Poland	141.63	8	54.54	8	87.09
9	Alexandra Nazarova / Maxim Nikitin	Ukraine	127.59	9	43.52	9	84.07
