= Timothy LeDuc =

American pair skater (born 1990)

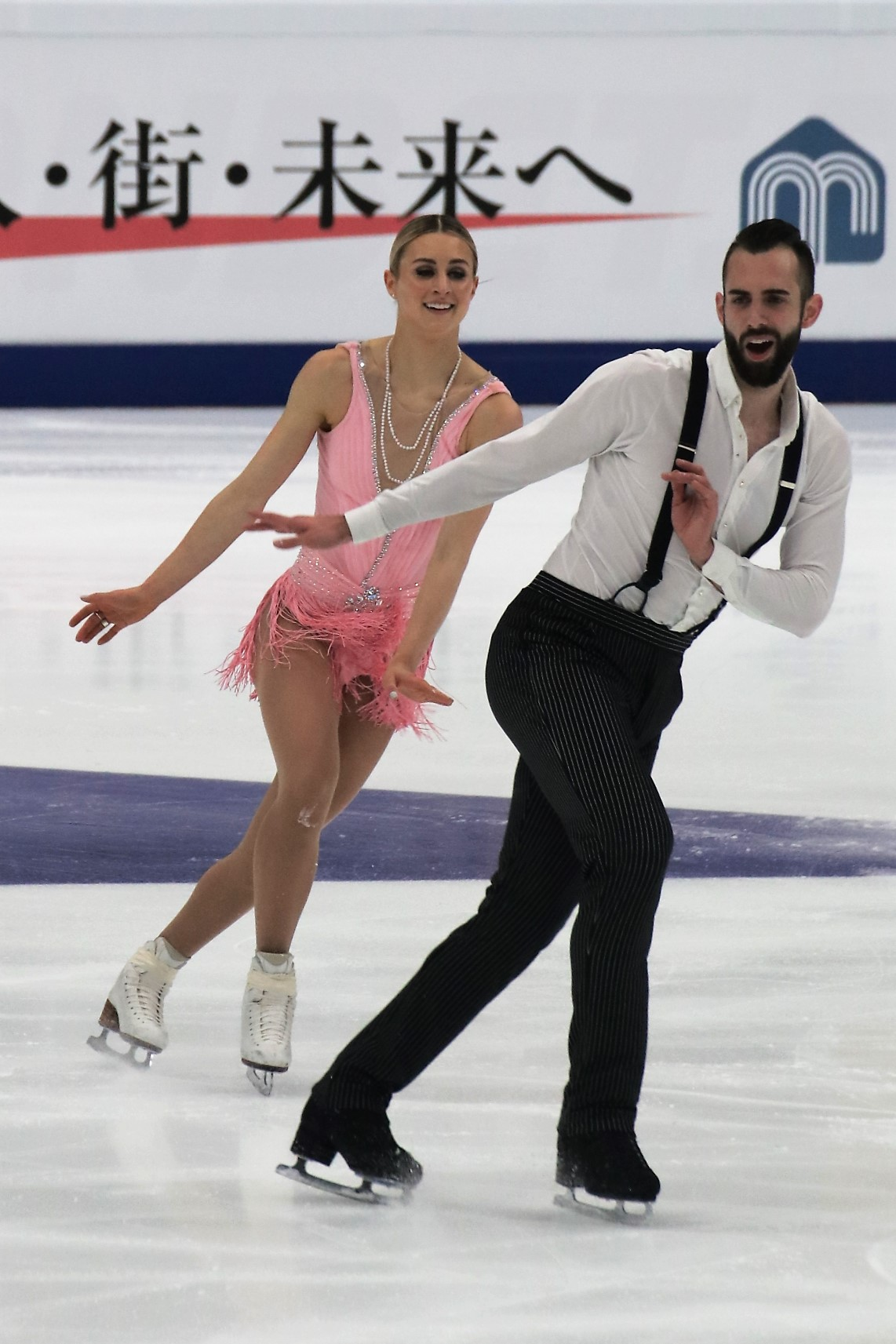
- Cain-Gribble and LeDuc at the 2018 Rostelecom Cup

Personal information
- Born: May 4, 1990 (age 36) Cedar Rapids, Iowa
- Home town: Dallas, Texas
- Height: 1.85 m (6 ft 1 in)

Figure skating career
- Country: United States
- Discipline: Pair skating
- Partner: Ashley Cain-Gribble (2016–22); DeeDee Leng (2012-14); Cassie Andrews (2010-11)
- Began skating: 2003
- Retired: 2022
- Highest WS: 14th
Four Continents Championships
Silver medal – second place	2018 Taipei	Pairs
U.S. Championships
Gold medal – first place	2019 Detroit	Pairs
Gold medal – first place	2022 Nashville	Pairs
Bronze medal – third place	2017 Kansas City	Pairs
Bronze medal – third place	2021 Las Vegas	Pairs
World Team Trophy
Gold medal – first place	2019 Fukuoka	Pairs
Bronze medal – third place	2017 Tokyo	Pairs

Timothy LeDuc (born May 4, 1990) is a retired American pair skater. With their skating partner, Ashley Cain, they are a two-time U.S. national champion (2019, 2022), the 2018 Four Continents silver medalist, and a two-time Grand Prix medalist. They are the first openly gay skater to win the pairs title at the U.S. Championships and the first openly non-binary athlete to qualify for the Winter Olympics.

== Personal life ==
Timothy LeDuc was born May 4, 1990, in Cedar Rapids, Iowa. When they first came out as gay at age 18, fellow Christians attempted to make them straight through conversion therapy, which LeDuc rejected. After they came out as non-binary, their family later came to accept their identity; LeDuc remarked, "Now my parents walk with me in Trans Pride marches and in Pride marches."

LeDuc became interested in figure skating after watching the 2002 Olympics and started taking figure skating lessons through the Learn to Skate program. LeDuc is the first openly gay skater to win the pairs title at the U.S. Championships. LeDuc is non-binary, and began using they/them pronouns in 2021.

== Career ==
=== Single skating ===
LeDuc began learning to skate when they were 12 years old and started private lessons two years later. They placed 7th in the novice men's category at the 2008 U.S. Championships.

=== Early partnerships ===
Competing in novice pairs, LeDuc placed tenth with Lauren Gifford at the 2010 U.S. Championships.

With Cassie Andrews, they won the junior bronze medal at the 2011 U.S. Championships and finished ninth at the 2011 World Junior Championships in Gangneung, South Korea. Moving up to the senior level the following season, they placed eleventh at the 2012 U.S. Championships.

LeDuc teamed up with DeeDee Leng in June 2012. After placing ninth at the 2013 U.S. Championships, they were assigned to the International Challenge Cup, where they finished fifth. The following season, the pair placed sixth at the 2013 International Cup of Nice and seventh at the 2014 U.S. Championships. After their partnership ended in 2014, LeDuc skated with their sister for two years in Willy Bietak ice shows on Royal Caribbean cruise ships. After completing their contract in March 2016, they decided to return to competition.

=== Partnership with Cain ===
Following a suggestion from U.S. Figure Skating's Mitch Moyer, LeDuc tried out with Ashley Cain in May 2016. On May 23, 2016, they confirmed their intention to compete together. The pair was coached by her father, Peter Cain, in Euless, Texas.

==== 2016–17 season ====
Cain/LeDuc received three Challenger Series assignments in the 2016–2017 season. After placing fourth at the 2016 Nebelhorn Trophy and 2016 Finlandia Trophy, they were awarded the bronze medal at the 2016 Golden Spin of Zagreb, where they upgraded their twist from a double to a triple. Cain stated, "We just started rotating it days before we left for that competition." At the 2017 US Figure Skating Championships, they placed third. They placed ninth at the 2017 Four Continents Championships.

==== 2017–18 season ====
Cain/LeDuc started the 2017–2018 season with a fourth-place finish at the 2017 Lombardia Trophy in mid-September. They placed seventh at the 2017 Nebelhorn Trophy in late September. At their first Grand Prix event, the 2017 Cup of China, they placed sixth. They placed third at the 2018 US Figure Skating Championships. They placed second at the 2018 Four Continents Figure Skating Championships and earned their first medal at a senior ISU Championship.

==== 2018–19 season ====
At 2018 US International Figure Skating Classic, Cain/LeDuc placed first overall with a score of 173.05. They placed first overall at the 2018 Ondrej Nepela Trophy, with a score of 181.56. At their first Grand Prix event of the season, 2018 Skate America, they placed third overall with a score of 175.05. At 2018 Rostelecom Cup, Cain/LeDuc placed sixth with a score of 170.29.

Following the Grand Prix, Cain/LeDuc competed in a third Challenger event, the Golden Spin of Zagreb. Second after the short program, the two placed fifth in the free skate following two falls. The second fall involved Cain being dropped on her head while exiting a lift, seemingly being knocked unconscious briefly, before getting up and completing the program. She was subsequently taken to the hospital. There was considerable controversy amongst commentators that the referee had not halted the performance. Cain was subsequently diagnosed with a concussion.

At the 2019 U.S. Championships, Cain/LeDuc won their first US pairs title after placing second in the short program and first in the free skate. Speaking afterward, LeDuc credited Cain's recovery, saying it "was like building a castle, one brick at a time. It’s been so inspiring for me to watch her push through this and give me strength. We are always trying to progress as a team, and this season, we took it very seriously, and we wanted to step it up." As national champions, Cain/LeDuc were assigned to compete at the 2019 Four Continents Championships in early February and as America's sole pairs team at the 2019 World Championships in Saitama, Japan.

Cain/LeDuc finished fourth at the Four Continents Championships, the highest placement for an American team, after finishing fourth in both segments. Cain had struggled in the practice sessions beforehand and felt dehydrated, but recovered and said she was satisfied with how they had performed.

At the World Championships, their first, Cain/LeDuc, placed ninth. LeDuc described the season as a "rollercoaster", given the issues with injuries, while Cain expressed pleasure at having earned a second pairs spot for the United States at the following year's World Championships. Cain/LeDuc concluded their season as part of the gold medal-winning Team USA at the 2019 World Team Trophy.

==== 2019–20 season ====
Cain/LeDuc began the season at the 2019 CS U.S. Classic, where they won gold, defeating reigning World silver medalists Evgenia Tarasova / Vladimir Morozov. They were considered one of the favorites for the gold medal at their first Grand Prix assignment of the year, the 2019 Skate America. They placed third in the short program after Cain fell on their throw triple Lutz. In the free skate, they had a second throw Lutz fall, as well as a popped side-by-side jump attempt and an aborted lift, which dropped them to fifth place overall. At their second Grand Prix, the 2019 Internationaux de France, Cain again fell on their throw Lutz in the short program, putting them fourth after that segment. They finally landed the throw Lutz in the free skate but remained in fourth place overall after Cain fell on their side-by-side triple Salchow attempt.

Competing at the 2020 U.S. Championships, Cain/LeDuc were fourth in the short program after she two-footed the landing of their throw Lutz and an error resulted in their death spiral element being completely invalidated. Struggling with the quality of elements in the free skate, they remained in fourth place overall, winning the pewter medal. LeDuc remarked, "it just wasn't in the cards for us today.

Despite their fourth place at the national championships, Cain/LeDuc were assigned to compete at the World Championships in Montreal, but these were canceled as a result of the coronavirus pandemic.

==== 2020–21 season ====
Cain/LeDuc were assigned to begin the season at the 2020 Skate America, which, due to the ISU's desire to minimize international travel during the pandemic, was attended only by skaters training in the United States. They placed fourth in the short program after both underrotated their jumps and Cain two-footed the land of their throw Lutz. They were third in the free skate, but remained in fourth place overall.

Competing next at the 2021 U.S. Championships, also held in Las Vegas, they placed fourth in the short program after Cain-Gribble fell on her jump attempt and again two-footed the throw Lutz landing. Second in the free skate, they rose to the bronze medal position overall. They were named as first alternates to the 2021 World team and were later called up after the withdrawal of silver medalists Calalang/Johnson. They placed ninth at the World Championships.

==== 2021–22 season ====
The duo's preparations for the Olympic season were hampered by Cain contracting COVID-19 in late summer. As a result, they withdrew from their planned debut at the 2021 Cranberry Cup. Instead, they first appeared on the Challenger series at the 2021 CS Autumn Classic International, where they won the bronze medal. At their second Challenger event, the 2021 CS Finlandia Trophy, they won a second bronze medal, defeating Calalang/Johnson narrowly.

On the Grand Prix at 2021 Skate Canada International, Cain/LeDuc were sixth in the short program, but a second-place free skate took them to the bronze medal. Cain said, "there were a lot of levels we didn’t get which kept our score under the 130-mark, but we are going to focus on consistency" looking forward. They placed fourth at their second event, the 2021 NHK Trophy, finishing with a new personal best in the free skate.

With defending national champions Knierim/Frazier forced to withdraw from the 2022 U.S. Championships but still anticipated to be named to the U.S. Olympic team, the contest for the second American berth was widely seen to be between Cain/LeDuc and Calalang/Johnson. Cain/LeDuc placed first in both segments of the competition, with the only error being Cain doubling out on a planned triple Salchow jump, while Calalang/Johnson made several errors and finished in second. They were named to the U.S. Olympic team the following day. LeDuc called the prospect "something we've dreamed about for a long time. We have worked so extremely hard and have visualized this so many times." LeDuc became the first out non-binary athlete assigned to compete at the Winter Olympics. In a February 2022 interview, LeDuc said that rather than a "romantic" approach to pair skating, they and Cain "[have] always been about equality and showing two amazing athletes coming together to create something beautiful." Commenting on the partnership, their coach, Peter Cain, stated: "They don't ever point fingers or blame each other. One person can make a mistake, and it’s the team, not the individual."

At the 2022 Winter Olympics in the pairs event, Cain/LeDuc placed eighth. They skated a strong short program to finish seventh in the segment. Cain had injured her right ankle in practice days earlier but said that "in the last two years, what we've learned the most is how to adapt to what has come our way, and this was just another thing that we needed to adapt to." In the free skate, Cain had multiple jump errors that dropped them to ninth in that segment and eighth overall.

Days after the Olympics concluded, Vladimir Putin ordered an invasion of Ukraine, as a result of which the International Skating Union banned all Russian and Belarusian skaters from competing at the 2022 World Championships. As well, the Chinese Skating Association opted not to send athletes to compete in Montpellier. As those countries’ athletes comprised the entirety of the top five pairs at the Olympics, this greatly impacted the field. Cain-Gribble/LeDuc entered the event as medal favorites. They placed second in the short program with a mostly clean program. Cain struggled in the free skate, falling on her triple loop jump and a throw triple Lutz, before a third fall on a triple Salchow caused her to hit her head on the ice. The program was stopped, and Cain was taken off the ice by medics on a stretcher for evaluation.

On June 13, Cain-Gribble and Leduc announced their retirement from competitive skating. LeDuc announced plans to move to Chicago to begin coaching.

== Programs ==
=== With Cain-Gribble ===
Season	Short program	Free skating	Exhibition
2021–2022	The White Crow by Ilan Eshkeri performed by Lisa Batiashvili	W.E. by Abel Korzeniowski	
2020–2021	Never Tear Us Apart by Bishop Briggs	Piano Concerto No. 2 by Sergei Rachmaninoff	
2019–2020	A Storm is Coming by Tommee Profitt, Liv Ash	The Middle of the World (from Moonlight) by Nicholas Britell; Experience by Ludovico Einaudi	
2018–2019	Bella Belle by The Electric Swing Circus	W.E. (soundtrack) by Abel Korzeniowski choreo. by Pasquale Camerlengo	Get Up by Leah LeDuc
2017–2018	I'll Take Care of You by Joe Bonamassa	The Great Gatsby (soundtrack): Bang Bang; Young and Beautiful; A Little Party Never Killed Nobody	
2016–2017	I Put a Spell on You by Jay Hawkins performed by Annie Lennox	The Prayer performed by Andrea Bocelli, Celine Dion	

=== With Leng ===
Season	Short program	Free skating
2013–2014	The Last Temptation of Christ by Peter Gabriel	Romeo and Juliet Overture: Love Theme by Pyotr I. Tchaikovsky
2012–2013	Incantation by Benoit Jutras	Romeo and Juliet Overture: Love Theme by Pyotr I. Tchaikovsky

=== With Andrews ===
Season	Short program	Free skating
2011–2012	Ancient Lands by Ronan Hardiman	Carmen Suite by Georges Bizet, Rodion Shchedrin
2010–2011	Big Love Adagio by Bond	Carmen Suite by Georges Bizet, Rodion Shchedrin

== Competitive highlights ==
- GP – Event of the ISU Grand Prix Series
- JGP – Event of the ISU Junior Grand Prix Series
- CS – Event of the ISU Challenger Series
- WD – Withdrew from competition
- C – Event was cancelled
- Medals at team events are awarded for the team results only. Individual placements at team events are listed in parentheses.

=== Pair skating with Ashley Cain-Gribble ===
Competition placements at senior level
Season	2016–17	2017–18	2018–19	2019-20	2020–21	2021–22
Winter Olympics						8th
World Championships			9th	C	9th	WD
Four Continents Championships	9th	2nd	4th			
U.S. Championships	3rd	4th	1st	4th	3rd	1st
World Team Trophy	3rd (5th)		1st (5th)			
GP Cup of China		6th				
GP France				4th		
GP NHK Trophy						4th
GP Rostelecom Cup			6th			
GP Skate America			3rd	5th	4th	
GP Skate Canada						3rd
CS Autumn Classic						3rd
CS Finlandia Trophy	4th					3rd
CS Golden Spin of Zagreb	3rd		5th	1st		
CS Lombardia Trophy		4th				
CS Nebelhorn Trophy	4th	7th				
CS Ondrej Nepela Trophy			1st			
CS U.S. Classic			1st	1st		

=== Pair skating with DeeDee Leng ===
Competition placements at senior level
Season	2012–13	2013–14
U.S. Championships	9th	7th
Challenge Cup	5th	
Cup of Nice		6th

=== Pair skating with Cassie Andrews ===
Competition placements at junior level
Season	2010–11
World Junior Championships	9th
U.S. Championships	3rd
JGP Great Britain	8th

== Detailed results ==
- Small medals for the short program and free skating are only awarded at ISU Championships.
- At national events in the United States, pewter medals are awarded for fourth place.
- Medals at team events are awarded for the team results only. Individual placements at team events are listed in parentheses.

=== Pair skating with Ashley Cain-Gribble ===
ISU personal best scores in the +5/-5 GOE System
Segment	Type	Score	Event
Total	TSS	205.58	2019 CS U.S. Classic
Short program	TSS	76.23	2019 CS U.S. Classic
Short program	TES	42.35	2019 CS U.S. Classic
Short program	PCS	34.98	2022 World Championships
Free skating	TSS	132.04	2021 NHK Trophy
Free skating	TES	66.19	2021 NHK Trophy
Free skating	PCS	67.54	2019 Internationaux de France

ISU personal best scores in the +3/-3 GOE System
Segment	Type	Score	Event
Total	TSS	190.61	2018 Four Continents Championships
Short program	TSS	66.76	2018 Four Continents Championships
Short program	TES	37.36	2018 Four Continents Championships
Short program	PCS	29.40	2018 Four Continents Championships
Free skating	TSS	123.85	2018 Four Continents Championships
Free skating	TES	63.51	2018 Four Continents Championships
Free skating	PCS	60.34	2018 Four Continents Championships

Results in the 2016–17 season
Date	Event	SP		FS		Total	
Date	Event	P	Score	P	Score	P	Score
Sep 22–24, 2016	(Germany) 2016 CS Nebelhorn Trophy	5	52.40	4	98.00	4	150.40
Oct 6–10, 2016	(Finland) 2016 CS Finlandia Trophy	6	54.26	4	104.37	4	158.63
Dec 7–10, 2016	(Croatia) 2016 CS Golden Spin of Zagreb	4	56.60	2	115.58	3	172.18
Jan 14–22, 2017	(United States) 2017 U.S. Championships	1	69.33	3	115.08	3	184.41
Feb 15–19, 2017	(South Korea) 2017 Four Continents Championships	9	62.58	10	106.27	9	168.87
Apr 20–23, 2017	(Japan) 2017 World Team Trophy	5	59.57	5	104.23	3 (5)	163.80

Results in the 2017–18 season
Date	Event	SP		FS		Total	
Date	Event	P	Score	P	Score	P	Score
Sep 14–17, 2017	(Italy) 2017 CS Lombardia Trophy	4	60.56	5	105.76	4	166.32
Sep 27–30, 2017	(Germany) 2017 CS Nebelhorn Trophy	10	55.47	5	120.88	7	176.35
Nov 3–5, 2017	2017 Cup of China	7	53.15	6	101.21	6	154.36
Dec 29, 2017 – Jan 8, 2018	(United States) 2018 U.S. Championships	8	60.03	4	127.11	4	187.14
Jan 22–28, 2018	(Taiwan) 2018 Four Continents Championships	1	66.76	2	123.85	2	190.61

Results in the 2018–19 season
Date	Event	SP		FS		Total	
Date	Event	P	Score	P	Score	P	Score
Sep 12–16, 2018	(United States) 2019 CS U.S. International Classic	1	59.10	1	113.95	1	173.05
Sep 19–22, 2018	(Slovakia) 2018 Ondrej Nepela Trophy	1	65.68	1	115.88	1	181.56
Oct 19–21, 2018	(United States) 2018 Skate America	4	57.72	2	117.34	3	176.06
Nov 16–18, 2018	(Russia) 2018 Rostelecom Cup	7	58.79	6	112.50	6	170.29
Dec 5–8, 2018	(Croatia) 2018 CS Golden Spin of Zagreb	2	64.34	5	105.33	5	169.67
Feb 4–10, 2019	(United States) 2019 Four Continents Championships	4	67.49	4	129.33	4	196.82
Mar 18–24, 2019	(Japan) 2019 World Championships	9	66.93	9	126.88	9	193.81
Apr 11–14, 2019	(Japan) 2019 World Team Trophy	5	66.91	5	125.24	1 (5)	192.15

Results in the 2019–20 season
Date	Event	SP		FS		Total	
Date	Event	P	Score	P	Score	P	Score
Sep 17–22, 2019	(United States) 2019 CS U.S. International Classic	1	76.23	1	129.35	1	205.58
Oct 18–20, 2019	(United States) 2019 Skate America	3	68.20	5	109.34	5	177.54
Nov 1–3, 2019	2019 Internationaux de France	4	66.12	4	129.66	4	195.78
Jan 20–26, 2020	(United States) 2020 U.S. Championships	4	67.56	4	128.26	4	197.12

Results in the 2020–21 season
Date	Event	SP		FS		Total	
Date	Event	P	Score	P	Score	P	Score
Oct 23–24, 2020	(United States) 2020 Skate America	4	64.21	3	125.02	4	189.23
Jan 11–21, 2021	(United States) 2021 U.S. Championships	4	65.81	2	134.71	3	200.52
Mar 22–28, 2021	(Sweden) 2021 World Championships	6	64.94	9	120.37	9	185.31

Results in the 2021–22 season
Date	Event	SP		FS		Total	
Date	Event	P	Score	P	Score	P	Score
Sep 16–18, 2021	(Canada) 2021 CS Autumn Classic International	3	59.58	5	111.06	3	170.64
Oct 7–10, 2021	(Finland) 2021 CS Finlandia Trophy	6	64.98	3	128.02	3	193.00
Oct 29–31, 2021	2021 Skate Canada International	6	61.68	2	128.22	3	189.90
Nov 12–14, 2021	(Japan) 2021 NHK Trophy	4	70.75	4	132.04	4	202.79
Jan 3–9, 2022	(United States) 2022 U.S. Championships	1	79.39	1	145.84	1	225.23
Feb 18–19, 2022	(China) 2022 Winter Olympics	7	74.13	9	123.92	8	198.05
Mar 21–27, 2022	(France) 2022 World Championships	2	75.85	–	–	–	WD
