= 2018 CS Ondrej Nepela Trophy =

Figure skating competition

- Type: ISU Challenger Series
- Date: September 19 – 22
- Season: 2018–19
- Location: Bratislava, Slovakia
- Host: Slovak Figure Skating Association
- Venue: Ondrej Nepela Arena

Champions
- Men's singles: (Russia) Mikhail Kolyada
- Ladies' singles: (Japan) Rika Kihira
- Pairs: (United States) Ashley Cain / Timothy LeDuc
- Ice dance: (Russia) Victoria Sinitsina / Nikita Katsalapov
- Previous: 2017 CS Ondrej Nepela Trophy
- Next: 2019 CS Nepela Memorial

The 2018 CS Ondrej Nepela Trophy was held on September 19–22, 2018, at the Ondrej Nepela Arena in Bratislava, Slovakia. It was part of the 2018–19 ISU Challenger Series. Medals were awarded in men's singles, women's singles, pair skating, and ice dance.

== Entries ==
The International Skating Union published the list of entries on August 27, 2018.

Country	Men	Ladies	Pairs	Ice dance
Austria	Manuel Drechsler; Albert Mück			
Belarus	Anton Karpuk	Alisa Turchina		Anna Kublikova / Yuri Hulitski
Bulgaria	Nicky Obreykov			
Czech Republic	Jiří Bělohradský	Elizaveta Ukolova		
Finland				Juulia Turkkila / Matthias Versluis
France				Adelina Galayavieva / Louis Thauron
Georgia	Morisi Kvitelashvili			
Germany				Katharina Müller / Tim Dieck
Hungary	Alexander Borovoj; Andras Csernoch			
Israel	Daniel Samohin			
Italy			Rebecca Ghilardi / Filippo Ambrosini	Jasmine Tessari / Francesco Fioretti
Japan	Keiji Tanaka	Rika Kihira; Rin Nitaya		
Kazakhstan		Elizabet Tursynbaeva		
Poland	Krzysztof Gala	Elzbieta Gabryszak		
Russia	Mikhail Kolyada; Alexander Samarin; Sergei Voronov	Stanislava Konstantinova; Polina Tsurskaya	Lina Kudryavtseva / Ilia Spiridonov	Betina Popova / Sergey Mozgov; Victoria Sinitsina / Nikita Katsalapov
Slovakia	Marco Klepoch; Michael Neuman	Silvia Hugec; Nina Letenayova; Maria Sofia Pucherova		
South Korea		Choi Yu-jin; Kim Hyun-soo		
Turkey	Burak Demirboğa			
Great Britain	Graham Newberry	Danielle Harrison; Kristen Spours		Lilah Fear / Lewis Gibson; Robynne Tweedale / Joseph Buckland
United States	Sean Rabbitt	Katie McBeath; Megan Wessenberg	Ashley Cain / Timothy LeDuc; Deanna Stellato / Nathan Bartholomay	Lorraine McNamara / Quinn Carpenter

=== Changes to preliminary assignments ===
Date	Discipline	Withdrew	Added	Notes	Refs
August 29	Ladies	(South Korea) Choi Da-bin	(South Korea) Kim Hyun-soo		
August 31	Ladies	(Croatia) Hana Cvijanovic	—N/a		
August 31	Ice dance	(Russia) Tiffany Zahorski / Jonathan Guerreiro	—N/a		
September 12	Ladies	(Germany) Lutricia Bock	—N/a		
September 12	Ladies	(Hungary) Daria Jakab	—N/a		
September 12	Ladies	(Singapore) Ceciliane Mei Ling Hartmann	—N/a		
September 12	Ladies	(Turkey) Sıla Saygı	—N/a		
September 12	Ladies	(Slovakia) Nicole Rajičová	(Slovakia) Maria Sofia Pucherova		
September 13	Men	(Austria) Luc Maierhofer	(Bulgaria) Nicky Obreykov		
September 13	Men	(Israel) Alexei Bychenko	—N/a		
September 13	Men	(Italy) Daniel Grassl	—N/a		
September 13	Men	(Italy) Jari Kessler	—N/a		
September 13	Men	(Russia) Alexey Erokhov	(Russia) Alexander Samarin		
September 13	Ice dance	(Israel) Shira Ichilov / Vadim Davidovich	—N/a		
September 13	Ice dance	(Poland) Natalia Kaliszek / Maksym Spodyriev	—N/a		
September 18	Pairs	(United Kingdom) Zoe Jones / Christopher Boyadji	—N/a	No longer enough pairs entries to be considered a Challenger Series event	
September 18	Ice dance	(France) Elise Montanier / Laurent Abecassis	—N/a		
September 19	Men	(Hong Kong) Lap Kan Yuen	—N/a		
September 19	Ladies	(Russia) Alina Zagitova	—N/a	Visa issues	

== Results ==
=== Men's singles ===
Rank	Skater	Nation	Total points	SP		FS	
1st place, gold medalist(s)	Mikhail Kolyada	Russia	274.37	1	96.82	1	177.55
2nd place, silver medalist(s)	Sergei Voronov	Russia	239.73	2	81.77	2	157.96
3rd place, bronze medalist(s)	Keiji Tanaka	Japan	221.92	3	77.53	4	144.39
4	Morisi Kvitelashvili	Georgia	221.63	4	76.49	3	145.14
5	Alexander Samarin	Russia	215.69	5	76.30	5	139.39
6	Daniel Samohin	Israel	197.80	7	70.93	6	126.87
7	Sean Rabbitt	United States	195.83	6	70.98	7	124.85
8	Jiří Bělohradský	Czech Republic	177.36	8	64.86	10	112.50
9	Burak Demirboğa	Turkey	170.62	11	55.54	8	115.08
10	Graham Newberry	Great Britain	169.19	10	58.32	11	110.87
11	Nicky Obreykov	Bulgaria	163.60	14	49.24	9	114.36
12	Krzysztof Gala	Poland	151.59	13	53.81	12	97.78
13	Marco Klepoch	Slovakia	150.33	12	53.98	13	96.35
14	Michael Neuman	Slovakia	146.03	9	60.04	14	85.99
15	Alexander Borovoj	Hungary	124.81	15	44.34	15	80.47
16	Anton Karpuk	Belarus	116.19	18	37.28	16	78.91
17	Andras Csernoch	Hungary	114.42	19	36.70	17	77.72
18	Manuel Drechsler	Austria	104.04	17	38.33	18	65.71
19	Albert Mück	Austria	86.05	16	38.62	19	47.43

=== Ladies' singles ===
Rank	Skater	Nation	Total points	SP		FS	
1st place, gold medalist(s)	Rika Kihira	Japan	218.16	1	70.79	1	147.37
2nd place, silver medalist(s)	Elizabet Tursynbaeva	Kazakhstan	192.30	2	69.99	2	122.31
3rd place, bronze medalist(s)	Stanislava Konstantinova	Russia	180.02	3	65.03	3	114.99
4	Polina Tsurskaya	Russia	154.61	4	54.36	5	100.25
5	Katie McBeath	United States	154.56	7	52.85	4	101.71
6	Choi Yu-jin	South Korea	150.14	6	54.20	6	95.94
7	Megan Wessenberg	United States	143.47	8	52.01	7	91.46
8	Silvia Hugec	Slovakia	135.00	5	54.24	10	80.76
9	Rin Nitaya	Japan	133.86	10	45.57	8	88.29
10	Elzbieta Gabryszak	Poland	132.46	9	46.91	9	85.55
11	Elizaveta Ukolova	Czech Republic	121.77	12	42.78	11	78.99
12	Danielle Harrison	Great Britain	120.02	11	43.26	12	76.76
13	Maria Sofia Pucherova	Slovakia	106.51	13	37.77	14	68.74
14	Kim Hyun-soo	South Korea	105.83	14	35.60	13	70.23
15	Alisa Turchina	Belarus	89.04	15	31.31	15	57.73

=== Pairs ===
Note: For this category, the 2018 Ondrej Nepela Trophy was not considered a Challenger Series event, since the minimum required number of entries for a Challenger Series event was not reached.

Rank	Team	Nation	Total points	SP		FS	
1st place, gold medalist(s)	Ashley Cain / Timothy LeDuc	United States	181.56	1	65.68	1	115.88
2nd place, silver medalist(s)	Deanna Stellato / Nathan Bartholomay	United States	174.78	3	59.60	2	115.18
3rd place, bronze medalist(s)	Lina Kudryavtseva / Ilia Spiridonov	Russia	157.12	2	62.69	4	94.43
4	Rebecca Ghilardi / Filippo Ambrosini	Italy	155.02	4	53.09	3	101.93

=== Ice dance ===
Rank	Team	Nation	Total points	RD		FD	
1st place, gold medalist(s)	Victoria Sinitsina / Nikita Katsalapov	Russia	196.42	1	75.96	1	120.46
2nd place, silver medalist(s)	Lorraine McNamara / Quinn Carpenter	United States	178.64	2	70.37	2	108.27
3rd place, bronze medalist(s)	Betina Popova / Sergey Mozgov	Russia	170.47	3	67.65	3	102.82
4	Jasmine Tessari / Francesco Fioretti	Italy	159.21	5	61.05	5	98.16
5	Lilah Fear / Lewis Gibson	Great Britain	158.85	8	59.34	4	99.51
6	Robynne Tweedale / Joseph Buckland	Great Britain	153.59	7	59.61	6	93.98
7	Juulia Turkkila / Matthias Versluis	Finland	150.66	6	60.61	7	90.05
8	Adelina Galayavieva / Louis Thauron	France	149.69	4	62.37	8	87.32
9	Katharina Müller / Tim Dieck	Germany	141.03	9	55.86	9	85.17
10	Anna Kublikova / Yuri Hulitski	Belarus	129.49	10	48.61	10	80.88
