= 2019–20 ISU Grand Prix of Figure Skating =

- Type: Grand Prix
- Date: October 18 – December 8, 2019
- Season: 2019–20
- Previous: 2018–19 Grand Prix
- Next: 2020–21 Grand Prix

The 2019–20 ISU Grand Prix of Figure Skating was a series of senior international competitions organized by the International Skating Union that were held from October 2019 through December 2019. Medals were awarded in men's singles, ladies' singles, pair skating, and ice dance. Skaters earned points based on their placements at each event and the top six in each discipline qualified to compete at the Grand Prix Final in Turin, Italy. The corresponding series for junior-level skaters was the 2019–20 ISU Junior Grand Prix.

As part of a new ISU deal, the 2019–20 Grand Prix series was streamed live on YouTube with geographical restrictions. The ISU had always streamed the Junior Grand Prix internationally without restrictions.

== Competitions ==
The series included the following events.

Date	Event	Location	Results
October 18–20	(United States) 2019 Skate America	Las Vegas, Nevada, United States	Details
October 25–27	2019 Skate Canada International	Kelowna, British Columbia, Canada	Details
November 1–3	2019 Internationaux de France	Grenoble, France	Details
November 8–10	2019 Cup of China	Chongqing, China	Details
November 15–17	(Russia) 2019 Rostelecom Cup	Moscow, Russia	Details
November 22–24	(Japan) 2019 NHK Trophy	Sapporo, Japan	Details
December 5–8	(Italy) 2019–20 Grand Prix Final	Turin, Italy	Details

== Requirements ==
Skaters were eligible to compete on the senior Grand Prix circuit if they had reached the age of 15 before July 1, 2019. They were also required to have earned a minimum total score at certain international events.

== Assignments ==
The ISU announced the preliminary assignments on June 20, 2019.

=== Men's singles ===
Nation	Skater	Assignment(s)	
Australia	Brendan Kerry	Skate Canada International	Cup of China
Canada	Keegan Messing	Skate America	Cup of China
Canada	Nicolas Nadeau	Skate Canada International	Internationaux de France
Canada	Nam Nguyen	Skate Canada International	Rostelecom Cup
Canada	Conrad Orzel	Cup of China	NHK Trophy
Canada	Roman Sadovsky	Skate Canada International	NHK Trophy
China	Jin Boyang	Skate America	Cup of China
Czech Republic	Michal Březina	Skate America	Rostelecom Cup
France	Kévin Aymoz	Internationaux de France	NHK Trophy
Georgia	Morisi Kvitelashvili	Internationaux de France	Rostelecom Cup
Israel	Alexei Bychenko	Skate America	NHK Trophy
Israel	Daniel Samohin	Internationaux de France	Rostelecom Cup
Italy	Matteo Rizzo	Skate Canada International	Cup of China
Japan	Yuzuru Hanyu	Skate Canada International	NHK Trophy
Japan	Koshiro Shimada	Skate America	NHK Trophy
Japan	Keiji Tanaka	Skate Canada International	Cup of China
Japan	Kazuki Tomono	Skate America	Rostelecom Cup
Japan	Shoma Uno	Internationaux de France	Rostelecom Cup
Latvia	Deniss Vasiļjevs	Skate Canada International	Rostelecom Cup
Russia	Dmitri Aliev	Skate America	Rostelecom Cup
Russia	Makar Ignatov	Rostelecom Cup	NHK Trophy
Russia	Andrei Lazukin	Skate Canada International	Cup of China
Russia	Alexander Samarin	Internationaux de France	Rostelecom Cup
Russia	Anton Shulepov	Internationaux de France	NHK Trophy
Russia	Sergei Voronov	Internationaux de France	NHK Trophy
South Korea	Cha Jun-hwan	Skate America	Cup of China
United States	Jason Brown	Skate America	NHK Trophy
United States	Nathan Chen	Skate America	Internationaux de France
United States	Tomoki Hiwatashi	Internationaux de France	NHK Trophy
United States	Alexei Krasnozhon	Skate America	Rostelecom Cup
United States	Camden Pulkinen	Skate Canada International	Cup of China
Azerbaijan	Vladimir Litvintsev	Rostelecom Cup	
China	Yan Han	Cup of China	
China	Zhang He	Cup of China	
Chinese Taipei	Tsao Chih-i	Cup of China	
France	Romain Ponsart	Internationaux de France	
Germany	Paul Fentz	Skate Canada International	
Japan	Sōta Yamamoto	NHK Trophy	
Malaysia	Julian Zhi Jie Yee	Skate Canada International	
Russia	Roman Savosin	Skate America	

=== Ladies' singles ===
Nation	Skater	Assignment(s)	
Australia	Kailani Craine	Cup of China	NHK Trophy
Canada	Véronik Mallet	Skate America	Skate Canada International
China	Chen Hongyi	Cup of China	Rostelecom Cup
France	Maé-Bérénice Méité	Internationaux de France	NHK Trophy
Germany	Nicole Schott	Internationaux de France	Rostelecom Cup
Hong Kong	Yi Christy Leung	Skate America	Cup of China
Japan	Wakaba Higuchi	Skate America	Internationaux de France
Japan	Marin Honda	Skate Canada International	Cup of China
Japan	Rika Kihira	Skate Canada International	NHK Trophy
Japan	Satoko Miyahara	Cup of China	Rostelecom Cup
Japan	Kaori Sakamoto	Skate America	Internationaux de France
Japan	Yuna Shiraiwa	Internationaux de France	Rostelecom Cup
Japan	Mako Yamashita	Skate America	NHK Trophy
Japan	Yuhana Yokoi	Rostelecom Cup	NHK Trophy
Russia	Stanislava Konstantinova	Skate America	Rostelecom Cup
Russia	Alena Kostornaia	Internationaux de France	NHK Trophy
Russia	Evgenia Medvedeva	Skate Canada International	Rostelecom Cup
Russia	Sofia Samodurova	Cup of China	NHK Trophy
Russia	Anna Shcherbakova	Skate America	Cup of China
Russia	Alexandra Trusova	Skate Canada International	Rostelecom Cup
Russia	Elizaveta Tuktamysheva	Skate America	Cup of China
Russia	Alina Zagitova	Internationaux de France	NHK Trophy
South Korea	Lim Eun-soo	Skate America	NHK Trophy
South Korea	You Young	Skate Canada International	Cup of China
Switzerland	Alexia Paganini	Skate Canada International	Rostelecom Cup
United States	Starr Andrews	Internationaux de France	NHK Trophy
United States	Mariah Bell	Internationaux de France	Rostelecom Cup
United States	Karen Chen	Skate America	NHK Trophy
United States	Amber Glenn	Skate America	Cup of China
United States	Bradie Tennell	Skate America	Skate Canada
Azerbaijan	Ekaterina Ryabova	Rostelecom Cup	
Canada	Gabrielle Daleman	Skate Canada International	
Canada	Alicia Pineault	Skate Canada International	
China	Zhu Yi	Cup of China	
Finland	Emmi Peltonen	Rostelecom Cup	
France	Laurine Lecavelier	Internationaux de France	
France	Léa Serna	Internationaux de France	
Russia	Serafima Sakhanovich	Skate Canada	
Russia	Maria Sotskova	Internationaux de France	
South Korea	Choi Yu-jin	Cup of China	
South Korea	Kim Ye-lim	Skate Canada International	
United States	Megan Wessenberg	NHK Trophy	

=== Pairs ===
Nation	Team	Assignment(s)	
Austria	Miriam Ziegler / Severin Kiefer	Internationaux de France	Rostelecom Cup
Canada	Liubov Ilyushechkina / Charlie Bilodeau	Skate Canada International	Cup of China
Canada	Kirsten Moore-Towers / Michael Marinaro	Skate Canada International	NHK Trophy
Canada	Camille Ruest / Andrew Wolfe	Skate America	Internationaux de France
Canada	Evelyn Walsh / Trennt Michaud	Skate Canada International	Rostelecom Cup
China	Peng Cheng / Jin Yang	Skate America	Cup of China
China	Sui Wenjing / Han Cong	Cup of China	NHK Trophy
China	Tang Feiyao / Yang Yongchao	Skate Canada International	Cup of China
Germany	Minerva Fabienne Hase / Nolan Seegert	Internationaux de France	Rostelecom Cup
Italy	Nicole Della Monica / Matteo Guarise	Cup of China	NHK Trophy
Italy	Rebecca Ghilardi / Filippo Ambrosini	Internationaux de France	Rostelecom Cup
Russia	Aleksandra Boikova / Dmitrii Kozlovskii	Skate Canada International	Rostelecom Cup
Russia	Alisa Efimova / Alexander Korovin	Cup of China	NHK Trophy
Russia	Anastasia Mishina / Aleksandr Galliamov	Internationaux de France	NHK Trophy
Russia	Daria Pavliuchenko / Denis Khodykin	Skate America	Internationaux de France
Russia	Evgenia Tarasova / Vladimir Morozov	Skate Canada International	Rostelecom Cup
United States	Ashley Cain-Gribble / Timothy LeDuc	Skate America	Internationaux de France
United States	Jessica Calalang / Brian Johnson	Skate America	Skate Canada
United States	Haven Denney / Brandon Frazier	Skate America	Internationaux de France
United States	Tarah Kayne / Danny O'Shea	Cup of China	NHK Trophy
United States	Alexa Scimeca Knierim / Chris Knierim	Skate Canada International	NHK Trophy
Australia	Ekaterina Alexandrovskaya / Harley Windsor	Skate America	
Great Britain	Zoe Jones / Christopher Boyadji	Skate America	
Japan	Riku Miura / Ryuichi Kihara	NHK Trophy	
North Korea	Ryom Tae-ok / Kim Ju-sik	Cup of China	
Russia	Ksenia Stolbova / Andrei Novoselov	Rostelecom Cup	
United States	Audrey Lu / Misha Mitrofanov	Rostelecom Cup	

=== Ice dance ===
Nation	Team	Assignment(s)	
Canada	Laurence Fournier Beaudry / Nikolaj Sørensen	Skate America	Cup of China
Canada	Piper Gilles / Paul Poirier	Skate Canada International	Rostelecom Cup
Canada	Marjorie Lajoie / Zachary Lagha	Skate Canada International	Rostelecom Cup
Canada	Carolane Soucisse / Shane Firus	Internationaux de France	NHK Trophy
China	Chen Hong / Sun Zhuoming	Skate America	Cup of China
China	Wang Shiyue / Liu Xinyu	Cup of China	NHK Trophy
France	Marie-Jade Lauriault / Romain Le Gac	Skate America	Internationaux de France
France	Gabriella Papadakis / Guillaume Cizeron	Internationaux de France	NHK Trophy
Great Britain	Lilah Fear / Lewis Gibson	Skate Canada International	NHK Trophy
Italy	Charlène Guignard / Marco Fabbri	Internationaux de France	NHK Trophy
Lithuania	Allison Reed / Saulius Ambrulevičius	Internationaux de France	Rostelecom Cup
Poland	Natalia Kaliszek / Maksym Spodyriev	Internationaux de France	Rostelecom Cup
Russia	Sofia Evdokimova / Egor Bazin	Skate Canada International	Cup of China
Russia	Victoria Sinitsina / Nikita Katsalapov	Cup of China	Rostelecom Cup
Russia	Sofia Shevchenko / Igor Eremenko	Skate America	NHK Trophy
Russia	Anastasia Skoptcova / Kirill Aleshin	Cup of China	Rostelecom Cup
Russia	Alexandra Stepanova / Ivan Bukin	Skate America	NHK Trophy
Russia	Tiffany Zahorski / Jonathan Guerreiro	Skate America	Internationaux de France
Spain	Sara Hurtado / Kirill Khaliavin	Skate Canada International	Rostelecom Cup
Spain	Olivia Smart / Adrián Díaz	Skate America	Internationaux de France
United States	Christina Carreira / Anthony Ponomarenko	Skate America	NHK Trophy
United States	Madison Chock / Evan Bates	Internationaux de France	Cup of China
United States	Caroline Green / Michael Parsons	Skate America	Skate Canada
United States	Kaitlin Hawayek / Jean-Luc Baker	Skate Canada International	Cup of China
United States	Madison Hubbell / Zachary Donohue	Skate America	Skate Canada
Canada	Haley Sales / Nikolas Wamsteeker	Skate Canada International	
China	Guo Yuzhu / Zhao Pengkun	Cup of China	
France	Adelina Galyavieva / Louis Thauron	Rostelecom Cup	
France	Julia Wagret / Pierre Souquet	Internationaux de France	
Italy	Jasmine Tessari / Francesco Fioretti	Rostelecom Cup	
Japan	Misato Komatsubara / Tim Koleto	Cup of China	
Russia	Betina Popova / Sergey Mozgov	Skate Canada International	
Russia	Anastasia Shpilevaya / Grigory Smirnov	Rostelecom Cup	
United States	Lorraine McNamara / Quinn Carpenter	NHK Trophy	

=== Changes to preliminary assignments ===
==== Skate America ====
Discipline	Withdrew		Added		Notes	Ref.
Discipline	Date	Skater(s)	Date	Skater(s)	Notes	Ref.
Men	—N/a		September 10	(United States) Alexei Krasnozhon	Host picks	
Ladies	—N/a		September 10	(United States) Amber Glenn	Host picks	
Pairs	—N/a		September 10	(United States) Jessica Calalang / Brian Johnson	Host picks	
Ice dance	—N/a		September 10	(United States) Caroline Green / Michael Parsons	Host picks	
Pairs	October 1	(Russia) Natalia Zabiiako / Alexander Enbert	October 4	(United Kingdom) Zoe Jones / Christopher Boyadji	Health (Enbert)	
Men	October 3	(France) Romain Ponsart	October 5	(Israel) Alexei Bychenko		
Ladies	October 11	(Kazakhstan) Elizabet Tursynbaeva	October 14	(Hong Kong) Yi Christy Leung	Injury	

==== Skate Canada International ====
Discipline	Withdrew		Added		Notes	Ref.
Discipline	Date	Skater(s)	Date	Skater(s)	Notes	Ref.
Ladies	—N/a		September 17	(Canada) Alicia Pineault	Host picks	
Pairs	—N/a		September 17	(Canada) Evelyn Walsh / Trennt Michaud	Host picks	
Men	October 2	(Russia) Mikhail Kolyada	October 9	(Malaysia) Julian Zhi Jie Yee	Surgery	
Ladies	October 3	(Japan) Mai Mihara	October 7	(Japan) Marin Honda	Health	
Ladies	October 21	(Canada) Aurora Cotop	October 21	(Canada) Véronik Mallet	Injury	

==== Internationaux de France ====
Discipline	Withdrew		Added		Notes	Ref.
Discipline	Date	Skater(s)	Date	Skater(s)	Notes	Ref.
Pairs	September 13	(France) Vanessa James / Morgan Ciprès	September 16	(North Korea) Ryom Tae-ok / Kim Ju-sik	Personal reasons	
Men	—N/a		September 13	(France) Adrien Tesson	Host picks	
Ladies	—N/a		September 13	(France) Léa Serna	Host picks	
Ice dance	—N/a		September 13	(France) Julia Wagret / Pierre Souquet	Host picks	
Pairs	September 27	(North Korea) Ryom Tae-ok / Kim Ju-sik	September 27	(Italy) Rebecca Ghilardi / Filippo Ambrosini		
Pairs	October 1	(Russia) Natalia Zabiiako / Alexander Enbert	October 7	(Canada) Camille Ruest / Andrew Wolfe	Health (Enbert)	
Ladies	October 9	(United States) Ting Cui	October 14	(United States) Starr Andrews	Injury	
Ice dance	October 10	(United States) Lorraine McNamara / Quinn Carpenter	October 11	(Lithuania) Allison Reed / Saulius Ambrulevičius	Injury	
Ladies	October 14	(Belgium) Loena Hendrickx	October 15	(Germany) Nicole Schott	Injury	
Men	October 28	(France) Adrien Tesson	—N/a			

==== Cup of China ====
Discipline	Withdrew		Added		Notes	Ref.
Discipline	Date	Skater(s)	Date	Skater(s)	Notes	Ref.
Men	—N/a		September 23	(China) Zhang He	Host picks	
Pairs	—N/a		September 23	(China) Tang Feiyao / Yang Yongchao	Host picks	
Ice dance	—N/a		September 23	(China) Guo Yuzhu / Zhao Pengkun	Host picks	
Ladies	—N/a		October 14	(Hong Kong) Yi Christy Leung	Host picks	
Ladies	October 20	(Japan) Mai Mihara	October 25	(Australia) Kailani Craine	Health	
Men	October 22	(United States) Vincent Zhou	October 25	(Canada) Conrad Orzel	Personal reasons	
Men	October 25	(Russia) Roman Savosin	October 26	(Australia) Brendan Kerry		
Ladies	October 25	(Kazakhstan) Elizabet Tursynbaeva	October 28	(South Korea) You Young	Injury	
Ladies	October 29	(Finland) Viveca Lindfors	November 1	(United States) Amber Glenn		
Ladies	October 30	(Canada) Gabrielle Daleman	November 1	(South Korea) Choi Yu-jin	Health	

==== Rostelecom Cup ====
Discipline	Withdrew		Added		Notes	Ref.
Discipline	Date	Skater(s)	Date	Skater(s)	Notes	Ref.
Men	—N/a		September 17	(Russia) Makar Ignatov	Host picks	
Pairs	—N/a		September 17	(Russia) Ksenia Stolbova / Andrei Novoselov	Host picks	
Ice dance	—N/a		September 17	(Russia) Anastasia Shpilevaya / Grigory Smirnov	Host picks	
Ice dance	October 1	(Finland) Juulia Turkkila / Matthias Versluis	October 11	(Italy) Jasmine Tessari / Francesco Fioretti	Injury (Turkkila)	
Ladies	October 14	(Belgium) Loena Hendrickx	October 14	(Finland) Emmi Peltonen	Injury	
Men	October 22	(United States) Vincent Zhou	October 23	(Israel) Daniel Samohin	Personal reasons	
Ladies	November 4	(France) Laurine Lecavelier	November 5	(Germany) Nicole Schott	Medical reasons	

==== NHK Trophy ====
Discipline	Withdrew		Added		Notes	Ref.
Discipline	Date	Skater(s)	Date	Skater(s)	Notes	Ref.
Men	—N/a		August 1	(Japan) Koshiro Shimada	Host picks	
Ladies	—N/a		August 1	(Japan) Yuhana Yokoi	Host picks	
Men	August 15	(Russia) Artur Dmitriev	August 23	(Russia) Anton Shulepov	Recovery	
Pairs	September 13	(France) Vanessa James / Morgan Ciprès	September 17	(Russia) Alisa Efimova / Alexander Korovin	Personal reasons	
Pairs	—N/a		September 17	(Japan) Riku Miura / Ryuichi Kihara	Host picks	
Men	October 2	(Russia) Mikhail Kolyada	October 9	(Russia) Makar Ignatov	Surgery	
Ladies	October 9	(United States) Ting Cui	October 14	(United States) Megan Wessenberg	Injury	
Ladies	November 5	(Finland) Viveca Lindfors	November 6	(Australia) Kailani Craine		
Ice dance	November 14	(Japan) Misato Komatsubara / Tim Koleto	—N/a		Recovery	

== Medal summary ==
Event	Discipline	Gold	Silver	Bronze
(United States) Skate America	Men	(United States) Nathan Chen	(United States) Jason Brown	(Russia) Dmitri Aliev
(United States) Skate America	Ladies	(Russia) Anna Shcherbakova	(United States) Bradie Tennell	(Russia) Elizaveta Tuktamysheva
(United States) Skate America	Pairs	(China) Peng Cheng / Jin Yang	(Russia) Daria Pavliuchenko / Denis Khodykin	(United States) Haven Denney / Brandon Frazier
(United States) Skate America	Ice dance	(United States) Madison Hubbell / Zachary Donohue	(Russia) Alexandra Stepanova / Ivan Bukin	(Canada) Laurence Fournier Beaudry / Nikolaj Sørensen

Event	Discipline	Gold	Silver	Bronze
Skate Canada International	Men	(Japan) Yuzuru Hanyu	(Canada) Nam Nguyen	(Japan) Keiji Tanaka
Skate Canada International	Ladies	(Russia) Alexandra Trusova	(Japan) Rika Kihira	(South Korea) You Young
Skate Canada International	Pairs	(Russia) Aleksandra Boikova / Dmitrii Kozlovskii	(Canada) Kirsten Moore-Towers / Michael Marinaro	(Russia) Evgenia Tarasova / Vladimir Morozov
Skate Canada International	Ice dance	(Canada) Piper Gilles / Paul Poirier	(United States) Madison Hubbell / Zachary Donohue	(United Kingdom) Lilah Fear / Lewis Gibson

Event	Discipline	Gold	Silver	Bronze
Internationaux de France	Men	(United States) Nathan Chen	(Russia) Alexander Samarin	(France) Kévin Aymoz
Internationaux de France	Ladies	(Russia) Alena Kostornaia	(Russia) Alina Zagitova	(United States) Mariah Bell
Internationaux de France	Pairs	(Russia) Anastasia Mishina / Aleksandr Galliamov	(Russia) Daria Pavliuchenko / Denis Khodykin	(United States) Haven Denney / Brandon Frazier
Internationaux de France	Ice dance	(France) Gabriella Papadakis / Guillaume Cizeron	(United States) Madison Chock / Evan Bates	(Italy) Charlène Guignard / Marco Fabbri

Event	Discipline	Gold	Silver	Bronze
Cup of China	Men	(China) Jin Boyang	(China) Yan Han	(Italy) Matteo Rizzo
Cup of China	Ladies	(Russia) Anna Shcherbakova	(Japan) Satoko Miyahara	(Russia) Elizaveta Tuktamysheva
Cup of China	Pairs	(China) Sui Wenjing / Han Cong	(China) Peng Cheng / Jin Yang	(Canada) Liubov Ilyushechkina / Charlie Bilodeau
Cup of China	Ice dance	(Russia) Victoria Sinitsina / Nikita Katsalapov	(United States) Madison Chock / Evan Bates	(Canada) Laurence Fournier Beaudry / Nikolaj Sørensen

Event	Discipline	Gold	Silver	Bronze
(Russia) Rostelecom Cup	Men	(Russia) Alexander Samarin	(Russia) Dmitri Aliev	(Russia) Makar Ignatov
(Russia) Rostelecom Cup	Ladies	(Russia) Alexandra Trusova	(Russia) Evgenia Medvedeva	(United States) Mariah Bell
(Russia) Rostelecom Cup	Pairs	(Russia) Aleksandra Boikova / Dmitrii Kozlovskii	(Russia) Evgenia Tarasova / Vladimir Morozov	(Germany) Minerva Fabienne Hase / Nolan Seegert
(Russia) Rostelecom Cup	Ice dance	(Russia) Victoria Sinitsina / Nikita Katsalapov	(Canada) Piper Gilles / Paul Poirier	(Spain) Sara Hurtado / Kirill Khaliavin

Event	Discipline	Gold	Silver	Bronze
(Japan) NHK Trophy	Men	(Japan) Yuzuru Hanyu	(France) Kévin Aymoz	(Canada) Roman Sadovsky
(Japan) NHK Trophy	Ladies	(Russia) Alena Kostornaia	(Japan) Rika Kihira	(Russia) Alina Zagitova
(Japan) NHK Trophy	Pairs	(China) Sui Wenjing / Han Cong	(Canada) Kirsten Moore-Towers / Michael Marinaro	(Russia) Anastasia Mishina / Aleksandr Galliamov
(Japan) NHK Trophy	Ice dance	(France) Gabriella Papadakis / Guillaume Cizeron	(Russia) Alexandra Stepanova / Ivan Bukin	(Italy) Charlène Guignard / Marco Fabbri

Event	Discipline	Gold	Silver	Bronze
(Italy) Grand Prix Final	Men	(United States) Nathan Chen	(Japan) Yuzuru Hanyu	(France) Kévin Aymoz
(Italy) Grand Prix Final	Ladies	(Russia) Alena Kostornaia	(Russia) Anna Shcherbakova	(Russia) Alexandra Trusova
(Italy) Grand Prix Final	Pairs	(China) Sui Wenjing / Han Cong	(China) Peng Cheng / Jin Yang	(Russia) Anastasia Mishina / Aleksandr Galliamov
(Italy) Grand Prix Final	Ice dance	(France) Gabriella Papadakis / Guillaume Cizeron	(United States) Madison Chock / Evan Bates	(United States) Madison Hubbell / Zachary Donohue

=== Medal standings ===
Rank	Nation	Gold	Silver	Bronze	Total
1	Russia	13	10	9	32
2	China	5	3	0	8
3	United States	4	6	5	15
4	France	3	1	2	6
5	Japan	2	4	1	7
6	Canada	1	4	4	9
7	Italy	0	0	3	3
8	Germany	0	0	1	1
8	Great Britain	0	0	1	1
8	South Korea	0	0	1	1
8	Spain	0	0	1	1
Totals (11 entries)		28	28	28	84

== Qualification ==
At each event, skaters earned points toward qualifying for the Grand Prix Final. Following the sixth event, the top six highest-scoring skaters/teams advanced to the Final. The points earned per placement were as follows:

Placement	Singles	Pairs/Ice dance
1st	15	15
2nd	13	13
3rd	11	11
4th	9	9
5th	7	7
6th	5	5
7th	4	—N/a
8th	3	—N/a

There were originally seven tie-breakers in cases of a tie in overall points:

1. Highest placement at an event. If a skater placed 1st and 3rd, the tiebreaker is the 1st place, and that beats a skater who placed 2nd in both events.
2. Highest combined total scores in both events. If a skater earned 200 points at one event and 250 at a second, that skater would win in the second tie-break over a skater who earned 200 points at one event and 150 at another.
3. Participated in two events.
4. Highest combined scores in the free skating/free dance portion of both events.
5. Highest individual score in the free skating/free dance portion from one event.
6. Highest combined scores in the short program/short dance of both events.
7. Highest number of total participants at the events.

If a tie remained, it was considered unbreakable and the tied skaters all advanced to the Grand Prix Final.

=== Qualification standings ===
Points	Men	Ladies	Pairs	Ice dance
30	(Japan) Yuzuru Hanyu (United States) Nathan Chen	(Russia) Alena Kostornaia (Russia) Alexandra Trusova (Russia) Anna Shcherbakova	(China) Sui Wenjing / Han Cong (Russia) Aleksandra Boikova / Dmitrii Kozlovskii	(France) Gabriella Papadakis / Guillaume Cizeron (Russia) Victoria Sinitsina / Nikita Katsalapov
28	(Russia) Alexander Samarin	—N/a	(China) Peng Cheng / Jin Yang	(Canada) Piper Gilles / Paul Poirier (United States) Madison Hubbell / Zachary Donohue
26	—N/a	(Japan) Rika Kihira	(Russia) Anastasia Mishina / Aleksandr Galliamov (Canada) Kirsten Moore-Towers / Michael Marinaro (Russia) Daria Pavliuchenko / Denis Khodykin	(Russia) Alexandra Stepanova / Ivan Bukin (United States) Madison Chock / Evan Bates
24	(Russia) Dmitri Aliev (France) Kévin Aymoz	(Russia) Alina Zagitova	(Russia) Evgenia Tarasova / Vladimir Morozov	—N/a
22	—N/a	(United States) Bradie Tennell (Japan) Satoko Miyahara (United States) Mariah Bell (Russia) Elizaveta Tuktamysheva	(United States) Haven Denney / Brandon Frazier	(Italy) Charlène Guignard / Marco Fabbri (Canada) Laurence Fournier Beaudry / Nikolaj Sørensen
20	(China) Jin Boyang (Canada) Nam Nguyen (United States) Jason Brown	(Russia) Evgenia Medvedeva (South Korea) You Young	—N/a	(United Kingdom) Lilah Fear / Lewis Gibson
18	(Japan) Keiji Tanaka (Canada) Keegan Messing	(Japan) Kaori Sakamoto	(Canada) Liubov Ilyushechkina / Charlie Bilodeau	(Spain) Sara Hurtado / Kirill Khaliavin (Spain) Olivia Smart / Adrián Díaz
16	(Italy) Matteo Rizzo	—N/a	(United States) Ashley Cain-Gribble / Timothy LeDuc (Austria) Miriam Ziegler / Severin Kiefer	(United States) Kaitlin Hawayek / Jean-Luc Baker (China) Wang Shiyue / Liu Xinyu
15	(Russia) Makar Ignatov	—N/a	—N/a	
14	(Russia) Sergei Voronov	(Japan) Yuhana Yokoi	(United States) Jessica Calalang / Brian Johnson	(Poland) Natalia Kaliszek / Maksym Spodyriev (Russia) Tiffany Zahorski / Jonathan Guerreiro
13	(China) Yan Han (Georgia (country)) Morisi Kvitelashvili	—N/a	—N/a	
12	(Japan) Shoma Uno (United States) Camden Pulkinen (Latvia) Deniss Vasiļjevs	(Russia) Sofia Samodurova	—N/a	
11	(Canada) Roman Sadovsky	(South Korea) Lim Eun-soo	(Germany) Minerva Fabienne Hase / Nolan Seegert	—N/a
10	(Japan) Kazuki Tomono	(United States) Starr Andrews (Japan) Wakaba Higuchi	(United States) Tarah Kayne / Danny O'Shea (Canada) Camille Ruest / Andrew Wolfe	(United States) Christina Carreira / Anthony Ponomarenko
9	—N/a	(United States) Amber Glenn (Japan) Marin Honda	(United States) Alexa Scimeca Knierim / Chris Knierim (Russia) Alisa Efimova / Alexander Korovin (Italy) Nicole Della Monica / Matteo Guarise	—N/a
8	(South Korea) Cha Jun-hwan (Canada) Nicolas Nadeau	—N/a		—N/a
7	(United States) Tomoki Hiwatashi	(Japan) Mako Yamashita (Azerbaijan) Ekaterina Ryabova	(Japan) Riku Miura / Ryuichi Kihara (North Korea) Ryom Tae-ok / Kim Ju-sik (Russia) Ksenia Stolbova / Andrei Novoselov	(Lithuania) Allison Reed / Saulius Ambrulevičius
5	(Japan) Sōta Yamamoto	—N/a	(Canada) Evelyn Walsh / Trennt Michaud	(Canada) Marjorie Lajoie / Zachary Lagha (Russia) Sofia Evdokimova / Egor Bazin (Russia) Anastasia Shpilevaya / Grigory Smirnov
4	(Israel) Alexei Bychenko (Australia) Brendan Kerry	(Switzerland) Alexia Paganini (Germany) Nicole Schott (South Korea) Kim Ye-lim	—N/a	
3	(Russia) Andrei Lazukin (Russia) Anton Shulepov	(United States) Karen Chen (China) Chen Hongyi (Hong Kong) Yi Christy Leung (Russia) Serafima Sakhanovich (France) Léa Serna	—N/a	

=== Qualifiers ===
No.	Men	Women	Pairs	Ice dance
1	(Japan) Yuzuru Hanyu	(Russia) Alena Kostornaia	(China) Sui Wenjing / Han Cong	(France) Gabriella Papadakis / Guillaume Cizeron
2	(United States) Nathan Chen	(Russia) Alexandra Trusova	(Russia) Aleksandra Boikova / Dmitrii Kozlovskii	(Russia) Victoria Sinitsina / Nikita Katsalapov
3	(Russia) Alexander Samarin	(Russia) Anna Shcherbakova	(China) Peng Cheng / Jin Yang	(Canada) Piper Gilles / Paul Poirier
4	(Russia) Dmitri Aliev	(Japan) Rika Kihira	(Russia) Anastasia Mishina / Aleksandr Galliamov	(United States) Madison Hubbell / Zachary Donohue
5	(France) Kévin Aymoz	(Russia) Alina Zagitova	(Canada) Kirsten Moore-Towers / Michael Marinaro	(Russia) Alexandra Stepanova / Ivan Bukin
6	(China) Jin Boyang	(United States) Bradie Tennell	(Russia) Daria Pavliuchenko / Denis Khodykin	(United States) Madison Chock / Evan Bates

Alternates

No.	Men	Women	Pairs	Ice dance
1	(Canada) Nam Nguyen	(Japan) Satoko Miyahara	(Russia) Evgenia Tarasova / Vladimir Morozov	(Italy) Charlène Guignard / Marco Fabbri
2	(United States) Jason Brown	(United States) Mariah Bell	(United States) Haven Denney / Brandon Frazier	(Canada) Laurence Fournier Beaudry / Nikolaj Sørensen
3	(Japan) Keiji Tanaka	(Russia) Elizaveta Tuktamysheva	(Canada) Liubov Ilyushechkina / Charlie Bilodeau	(United Kingdom) Lilah Fear / Lewis Gibson

== Top scores ==
=== Men's singles ===
Top 10 best scores in the men's combined total
No.	Skater	Nation	Score	Event
1	Nathan Chen	United States	335.30	2019–20 Grand Prix Final
2	Yuzuru Hanyu	Japan	322.59	2019 Skate Canada International
3	Kévin Aymoz	France	275.63	2019–20 Grand Prix Final
4	Alexander Samarin	Russia	265.10	2019 Internationaux de France
5	Nam Nguyen	Canada	262.77	2019 Skate Canada International
6	Jin Boyang	China	261.53	2019 Cup of China
7	Dmitri Aliev	Russia	259.88	2019 Rostelecom Cup
8	Jason Brown	United States	255.09	2019 Skate America
9	Makar Ignatov	Russia	252.87	2019 Rostelecom Cup
10	Shoma Uno	Japan	252.24	2019 Rostelecom Cup

Top 10 best scores in the men's short program
No.	Skater	Nation	Score	Event
1	Nathan Chen	United States	110.38	2019–20 Grand Prix Final
2	Yuzuru Hanyu	Japan	109.60	2019 Skate Canada International
3	Alexander Samarin	Russia	98.48	2019 Internationaux de France
4	Kévin Aymoz	France	96.71	2019–20 Grand Prix Final
5	Dmitri Aliev	Russia	96.57	2019 Skate America
6	Keegan Messing	Canada	96.34	2019 Skate America
7	Camden Pulkinen	United States	89.05	2019 Skate Canada International
8	Sergei Voronov	Russia	88.63	2019 NHK Trophy
9	Makar Ignatov	Russia	87.54	2019 Rostelecom Cup
10	Shoma Uno	Japan	87.29	2019 Rostelecom Cup

Top 10 best scores in the men's free skating
No.	Skater	Nation	Score	Event
1	Nathan Chen	United States	224.92	2019–20 Grand Prix Final
2	Yuzuru Hanyu	Japan	212.99	2019 Skate Canada International
3	Kévin Aymoz	France	178.92	2019–20 Grand Prix Final
4	Nam Nguyen	Canada	178.69	2019 Skate Canada International
5	Jin Boyang	China	176.10	2019 Cup of China
6	Jason Brown	United States	171.64	2019 Skate America
6	Alexander Samarin	Russia	171.64	2019 Rostelecom Cup
8	Keiji Tanaka	Japan	169.91	2019 Skate Canada International
9	Dmitri Aliev	Russia	169.24	2019 Rostelecom Cup
10	Roman Sadovsky	Canada	168.99	2019 NHK Trophy

=== Ladies' singles ===
Top 10 best scores in the ladies' combined total
No.	Skater	Nation	Score	Event
1	Alena Kostornaia	Russia	247.59	2019–20 Grand Prix Final
2	Alexandra Trusova	Russia	241.02	2019 Skate Canada International
3	Anna Shcherbakova	Russia	240.92	2019–20 Grand Prix Final
4	Rika Kihira	Japan	231.84	2019 NHK Trophy
5	Evgenia Medvedeva	Russia	225.76	2019 Rostelecom Cup
6	Alina Zagitova	Russia	217.99	2019 NHK Trophy
7	You Young	South Korea	217.49	2019 Skate Canada International
8	Bradie Tennell	United States	216.14	2019 Skate America
9	Mariah Bell	United States	212.89	2019 Internationaux de France
10	Satoko Miyahara	Japan	211.18	2019 Cup of China

Top 10 best scores in the ladies' short program
No.	Skater	Nation	Score	Event
1	Alena Kostornaia	Russia	85.45	2019–20 Grand Prix Final
2	Rika Kihira	Japan	81.35	2019 Skate Canada International
3	Alina Zagitova	Russia	79.60	2019–20 Grand Prix Final
4	Anna Shcherbakova	Russia	78.27	2019–20 Grand Prix Final
5	You Young	South Korea	78.22	2019 Skate Canada International
6	Evgenia Medvedeva	Russia	76.93	2019 Rostelecom Cup
7	Bradie Tennell	United States	75.10	2019 Skate America
8	Alexandra Trusova	Russia	74.40	2019 Skate Canada International
9	Kaori Sakamoto	Japan	73.25	2019 Skate America
10	Wakaba Higuchi	Japan	71.76	2019 Skate America

Top 10 best scores in the ladies' free skating
No.	Skater	Nation	Score	Event
1	Alexandra Trusova	Russia	166.62	2019 Skate Canada International
2	Anna Shcherbakova	Russia	162.65	2019–20 Grand Prix Final
3	Alena Kostornaia	Russia	162.14	2019–20 Grand Prix Final
4	Rika Kihira	Japan	151.95	2019 NHK Trophy
5	Alina Zagitova	Russia	151.15	2019 NHK Trophy
6	Evgenia Medvedeva	Russia	148.83	2019 Rostelecom Cup
7	Elizaveta Tuktamysheva	Russia	143.53	2019 Cup of China
8	Mariah Bell	United States	142.64	2019 Internationaux de France
9	Satoko Miyahara	Japan	142.27	2019 Cup of China
10	Bradie Tennell	United States	141.04	2019 Skate America

=== Pairs ===
Top 10 best scores in the pairs' combined total
No.	Team	Nation	Score	Event
1	Aleksandra Boikova / Dmitrii Kozlovskii	Russia	229.48	2019 Rostelecom Cup
2	Sui Wenjing / Han Cong	China	228.37	2019 Cup of China
3	Evgenia Tarasova / Vladimir Morozov	Russia	216.77	2019 Rostelecom Cup
4	Kirsten Moore-Towers / Michael Marinaro	Canada	208.49	2019 Skate Canada International
4	Kirsten Moore-Towers / Michael Marinaro	Canada	208.49	2019 NHK Trophy
5	Anastasia Mishina / Aleksandr Galliamov	Russia	207.58	2019 Internationaux de France
6	Daria Pavliuchenko / Denis Khodykin	Russia	206.56	2019 Internationaux de France
7	Peng Cheng / Jin Yang	China	204.27	2019–20 Grand Prix Final
8	Alexa Scimeca Knierim / Chris Knierim	United States	199.57	2019 Skate Canada International
9	Haven Denney / Brandon Frazier	United States	199.40	2019 Internationaux de France
10	Ashley Cain-Gribble / Timothy LeDuc	United States	195.78	2019 Internationaux de France

Top 10 best scores in the pairs' short program
No.	Team	Nation	Score	Event
1	Sui Wenjing / Han Cong	China	81.27	2019 NHK Trophy
2	Aleksandra Boikova / Dmitrii Kozlovskii	Russia	80.14	2019 Rostelecom Cup
3	Evgenia Tarasova / Vladimir Morozov	Russia	76.81	2019 Rostelecom Cup
4	Daria Pavliuchenko / Denis Khodykin	Russia	76.59	2019 Internationaux de France
5	Kirsten Moore-Towers / Michael Marinaro	Canada	75.50	2019 Skate Canada International
6	Anastasia Mishina / Aleksandr Galliamov	Russia	73.77	2019 Internationaux de France
7	Peng Cheng / Jin Yang	China	72.73	2019 Skate America
8	Alexa Scimeca Knierim / Chris Knierim	United States	71.28	2019 Skate Canada International
9	Liubov Ilyushechkina / Charlie Bilodeau	Canada	68.98	2019 Cup of China
10	Ksenia Stolbova / Andrei Novoselov	Russia	68.74	2019 Rostelecom Cup

Top 10 best scores in the pairs' free skating
No.	Team	Nation	Score	Event
1	Aleksandra Boikova / Dmitrii Kozlovskii	Russia	149.34	2019 Rostelecom Cup
2	Sui Wenjing / Han Cong	China	147.47	2019 Cup of China
3	Evgenia Tarasova / Vladimir Morozov	Russia	139.96	2019 Rostelecom Cup
4	Kirsten Moore-Towers / Michael Marinaro	Canada	137.28	2019 NHK Trophy
5	Peng Cheng / Jin Yang	China	134.60	2019–20 Grand Prix Final
6	Anastasia Mishina / Aleksandr Galliamov	Russia	134.35	2019 NHK Trophy
7	Haven Denney / Brandon Frazier	United States	130.75	2019 Internationaux de France
8	Daria Pavliuchenko / Denis Khodykin	Russia	129.97	2019 Internationaux de France
9	Ashley Cain-Gribble / Timothy LeDuc	United States	129.66	2019 Internationaux de France
10	Alexa Scimeca Knierim / Chris Knierim	United States	128.29	2019 Skate Canada International

=== Ice dance ===
Top 10 best scores in the combined total (ice dance)
No.	Team	Nation	Score	Event
1	Gabriella Papadakis / Guillaume Cizeron	France	226.61	2019 NHK Trophy
2	Victoria Sinitsina / Nikita Katsalapov	Russia	212.15	2019 Rostelecom Cup
3	Madison Chock / Evan Bates	United States	210.68	2019–20 Grand Prix Final
4	Madison Hubbell / Zachary Donohue	United States	209.55	2019 Skate America
5	Piper Gilles / Paul Poirier	Canada	209.01	2019 Skate Canada International
6	Alexandra Stepanova / Ivan Bukin	Russia	208.81	2019 NHK Trophy
7	Charlène Guignard / Marco Fabbri	Italy	203.34	2019 Internationaux de France
8	Laurence Fournier Beaudry / Nikolaj Sørensen	Canada	197.53	2019 Skate America
9	Lilah Fear / Lewis Gibson	Great Britain	195.35	2019 Skate Canada International
10	Kaitlin Hawayek / Jean-Luc Baker	United States	194.77	2019 Skate Canada International

Top 10 best scores in the rhythm dance
No.	Team	Nation	Score	Event
1	Gabriella Papadakis / Guillaume Cizeron	France	90.03	2019 NHK Trophy
2	Victoria Sinitsina / Nikita Katsalapov	Russia	86.09	2019 Rostelecom Cup
3	Madison Hubbell / Zachary Donohue	United States	84.97	2019 Skate America
4	Alexandra Stepanova / Ivan Bukin	Russia	84.07	2019 NHK Trophy
5	Piper Gilles / Paul Poirier	Canada	82.58	2019 Skate Canada International
6	Charlène Guignard / Marco Fabbri	Italy	82.13	2019 NHK Trophy
7	Madison Chock / Evan Bates	United States	81.67	2019–20 Grand Prix Final
8	Kaitlin Hawayek / Jean-Luc Baker	United States	79.52	2019 Skate Canada International
9	Laurence Fournier Beaudry / Nikolaj Sørensen	Canada	79.17	2019 Skate America
10	Lilah Fear / Lewis Gibson	Great Britain	76.67	2019 Skate Canada International

Top 10 best scores in the free dance
No.	Team	Nation	Score	Event
1	Gabriella Papadakis / Guillaume Cizeron	France	136.58	2019 NHK Trophy
2	Madison Chock / Evan Bates	United States	129.01	2019–20 Grand Prix Final
3	Piper Gilles / Paul Poirier	Canada	126.43	2019 Skate Canada International
4	Victoria Sinitsina / Nikita Katsalapov	Russia	126.06	2019 Rostelecom Cup
5	Madison Hubbell / Zachary Donohue	United States	125.21	2019–20 Grand Prix Final
6	Alexandra Stepanova / Ivan Bukin	Russia	124.74	2019 NHK Trophy
7	Charlène Guignard / Marco Fabbri	Italy	123.69	2019 Internationaux de France
8	Lilah Fear / Lewis Gibson	Great Britain	118.68	2019 Skate Canada International
9	Laurence Fournier Beaudry / Nikolaj Sørensen	Canada	118.36	2019 Skate America
10	Kaitlin Hawayek / Jean-Luc Baker	United States	115.25	2019 Skate Canada International
