= Ekaterina Ryabova (figure skater) =

Russian-Azerbaijani figure skater

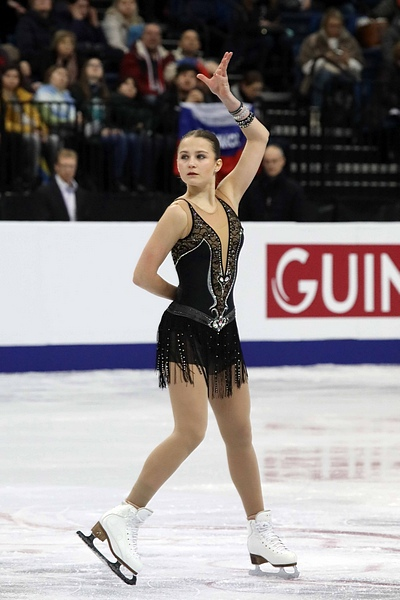
- Ryabova at the 2019 European Championships

Personal information
- Native name: Екатерина Алексеевна Рябова (Russian)
- Full name: Ekaterina Alexeyevna Ryabova
- Born: 27 March 2003 (age 23) Moscow, Russia
- Height: 1.63 m (5 ft 4 in)

Figure skating career
- Country: Azerbaijan (2018–2022); Russia (2014)
- Coach: Alexei Ryabov, Ekaterina Bandurina, Evgeni Plushenko, Maria Butyrskaia
- Skating club: Baku, Neftchi
- Began skating: 2006
- Retired: September 6, 2022

Ekaterina Alexeyevna Ryabova (Russian: Екатерина Алексеевна Рябова; born 27 March 2003) is a retired Russian-born Azerbaijani figure skater who represented Azerbaijan in women's singles. She is the 2021 CS Denis Ten Memorial Challenge silver medalist, the 2019 CS Ice Star bronze medalist, the 2018 Ice Star champion, the 2019 Volvo Open Cup silver medalist, and the 2019 Azerbaijani national champion.

Ryabova placed eighth at the 2020 Winter Youth Olympics. She is currently the 13th highest-ranked ladies figure skater in the world by the International Skating Union.

== Personal life ==
Ryabova was born on 27 March 2003 in Moscow, Russia. Her younger sister Anna is also a skater. Ryabova became engaged to French ice dancer Geoffrey Brissaud on 23 April 2022. She announced the end of their relationship in June 2023.

== Career ==
=== Early years ===
Ryabova began learning to skate in 2006 as a three-year-old. As a child, she trained under her father, Alexei Ryabov, at the Dynamo Moscow sports club. In 2015, she moved to Sambo 70 to be coached by Sergei Davydov. She changed coaches after a year, joining Alexander Volkov and Evgeni Plushenko at the Angels of Plushenko rink.

Ryabova made her debut for Russia in 2014 at the advanced novice level. She made no junior international appearances for Russia.

=== 2018–2019 season ===
Ryabova made her international debut for Azerbaijan in September 2018 at the ISU Junior Grand Prix (JGP) in Kaunas, Lithuania. She finished sixth overall after placing seventh in both segments. She had the same final result at her second assignment, 2018 JGP Slovenia.

Making her senior international debut, Ryabova won gold in October at the 2018 Minsk Arena Ice Star, outscoring the silver medalist, France's Léa Serna, by about nine points. She placed eighth at the 2018 CS Tallinn Trophy and sixth at the 2018 CS Golden Spin of Zagreb.

In January 2019, Ryabova was named to Azerbaijan's team for the 2019 European Championships in Minsk, Belarus. Ranked seventh in the short program, she qualified to the free skate. She placed thirteenth in the free skate and finished twelfth overall.

In March 2019, at the 2019 World Championships, Ryabova placed seventeenth in the short program and qualified to the free skate. She placed thirteenth in the free skate and thirteenth overall.

=== 2019–2020 season ===
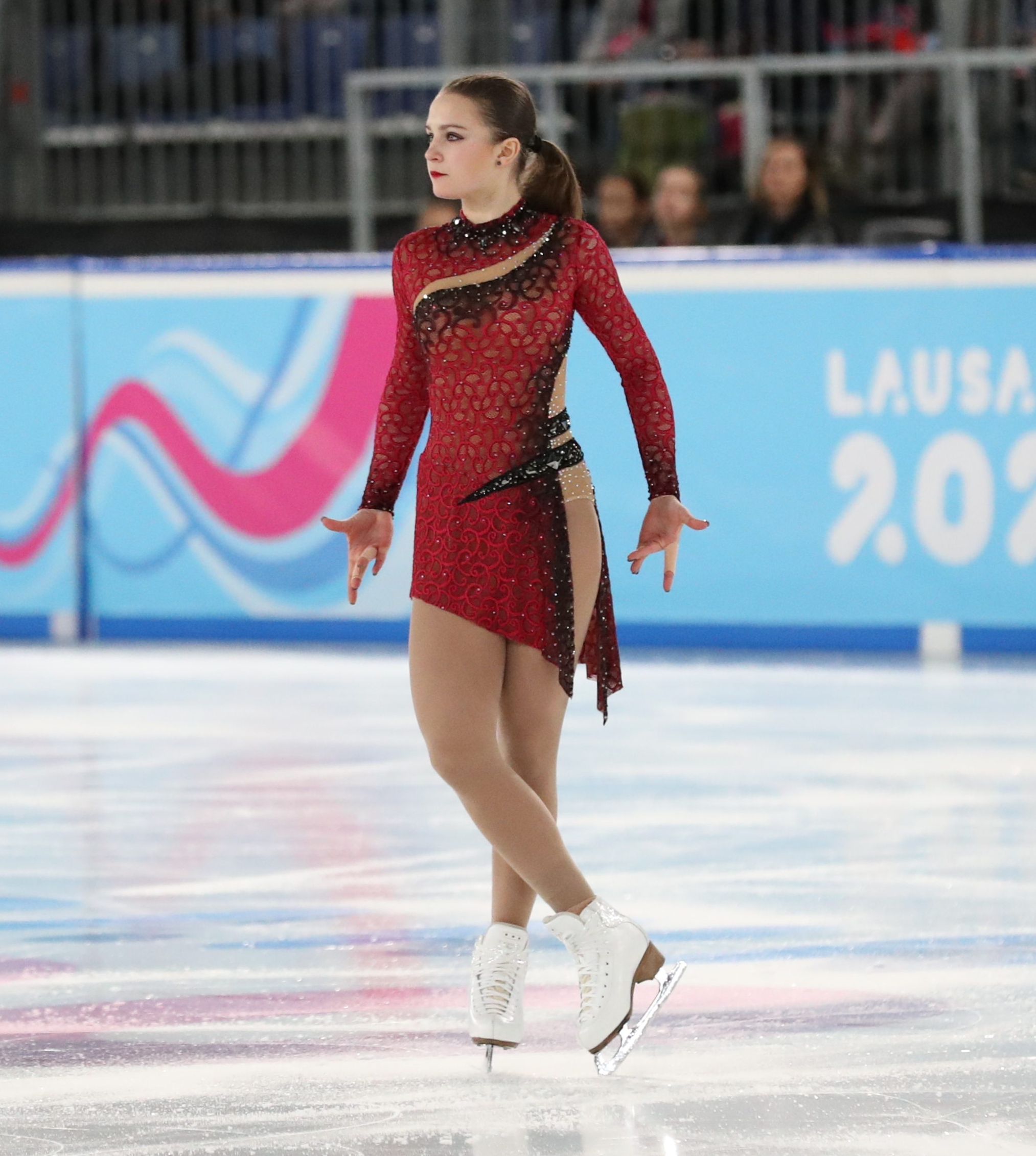
Ryabova at the 2020 Winter Youth Olympics

Ryabova opened her first full senior season in September 2019 at the 2019 CS Ondrej Nepela Memorial, where she placed fifth overall. She was fifth as well at the Denis Ten Memorial Challenge before winning the bronze medal at the 2019 CS Ice Star and silver at the Volvo Open Cup. Making her Grand Prix debut at the 2019 Rostelecom Cup, she placed fifth there.

Competing as a junior, Ryabova placed eighth at the 2020 Winter Youth Olympics in January 2020. She then finished sixth at the 2020 European Championships later in the month.

Ryabova finished the season with a tenth-place finish at the 2020 World Junior Championships. She was also assigned to compete at the 2020 World Championships, but these were cancelled due to the COVID-19 pandemic.

=== 2020–2021 season ===
With the pandemic continuing to limit international events, Ryabova competed at the 2020 Rostelecom Cup, placing ninth. In December, she left coaches Evgeni Plushenko and Alexander Volkov, citing being "no longer satisfied with the training conditions." She returned to her previous coaches, her parents, Alexei Ryabov and Ekaterina Bandurina.

Ryabova competed at the 2021 World Championships in Stockholm, placing twelfth to qualify for a berth for Azerbaijan at the 2022 Winter Olympics.

=== 2021–2022 season ===
Ryabova began the Olympic season at the 2021 Budapest Trophy, where she placed fourth, before winning the silver medal at the 2021 Denis Ten Memorial Challenge. On the Grand Prix, Ryabova finished in seventh place at her first event, the 2021 Internationaux de France. She went on to place tenth at the 2021 Rostelecom Cup. Ryabova closed out the year by winning the Santa Claus Cup.

At the 2022 European Championships, Ryabova finished in sixth place. Competing in the women's event at the 2022 Winter Olympics, Ryabova was sixteenth in the short program. Fifteenth in the free skate, she rose to fifteenth overall.

Days after the Olympics concluded, Vladimir Putin ordered an invasion of Ukraine, as a result of which the International Skating Union banned all Russian and Belarusian skaters from competing at the 2022 World Championships. However, Ryabova was still allowed to compete since she represented Azerbaijan. Ryabova placed ninth in the short program. Eleventh in the free skate, she remained ninth overall.

=== Retirement ===
Ryabova announced her retirement from competitive figure skating on Instagram on 6 September 2022.

== Programs ==
Season	Short program	Free skating	Exhibition
2021–2022	Mambo Italiano by Bob Merrill performed by Bette Midler	Le temps de cathedrales performed by Bruno Pelletier; La Monture performed by Julie Zenatti (from Notre-Dame de Paris) by Riccardo Cocciante & Luc Plamondon	You are my gentleness by Nargiz
2020–2021	Mambo Italiano by Bob Merrill performed by Sophia Loren	Stop! by Sam Brown	
2019–2020	El Tango de Roxanne (from Moulin Rouge!) performed by Anna Dereszowska & Machina Del Tango	Godfather by Edvin Marton; Speak Softly, Love (from The Godfather) by Nino Rota performed by Simone Egeriis	The Color of the Night (from Color of Night) performed by Lauren Christy
2018–2019	Puttin' On the Ritz performed by Miss Kookie	Admiral (soundtrack) by Trevor Morris; Aurora (soundtrack)	
2017–2018	Fly Away On The Wings Of The Wind (Polovtsian Dances) (from Prince Igor) performed by Natasha Morozova	The Color of the Night (from Color of Night) performed by Lauren Christy	

== Competitive highlights ==
GP: Grand Prix; CS: Challenger Series; JGP: Junior Grand Prix

=== For Azerbaijan ===
International
Event	18–19	19–20	20–21	21–22	22–23
Olympics				14th	
Worlds	13th	C	12th	9th	
Europeans	12th	6th		5th	
GP France				7th	
GP NHK Trophy					WD
GP Rostelecom Cup		5th	9th	10th	
GP Skate Canada					WD
CS Denis Ten Mem.				2nd	
CS Golden Spin	6th	5th			
CS Ice Star		3rd			
CS Ondrej Nepela		5th			
CS Tallinn Trophy	8th				
Budapest Trophy				4th	
Denis Ten Memorial		5th			
Ice Star	1st				
Santa Claus Cup				1st	
Volvo Open Cup		2nd		WD	
International: Junior
Youth Olympics		8th			
Junior Worlds	13th	10th			
JGP Lithuania	6th				
JGP Slovenia	6th				
National
Azerbaijani Champ.	1st				
TBD = Assigned; WD = Withdrew; C = Event cancelled

== Detailed results ==
Small medals for short and free programs awarded only at ISU Championships. Personal bests highlighted in bold.

2021–22 season
Date	Event	Level	SP	FS	Total
March 21–27, 2022	2022 World Championships	Senior	9; 65.52	11; 122.98	9; 188.50
February 15–17, 2022	2022 Winter Olympics	Senior	15; 61.82	14; 118.15	14; 179.97
January 10–16, 2022	2022 European Championships	Senior	7; **65.47**	6; **131.28**	6; **196.75**
December 6–12, 2021	2021 Santa Claus Cup	Senior	1; 66.00	1; 121.49	1; 187.49
November 26–28, 2021	2021 Rostelecom Cup	Senior	8; 58.87	10; 116.37	10; 175.24
November 19–21, 2021	2021 Internationaux de France	Senior	7; 63.34	8; 123.31	7; 186.65
October 28–31, 2021	2021 Denis Ten Memorial	Senior	3; 63.77	2; 115.73	2; 179.50
October 14–17, 2021	2021 Budapest Trophy	Senior	4; 64.32	4; 120.61	4; 184.93
**2020–21 season**
Date	Event	Level	SP	FS	Total
22–28 March 2021	2021 World Championships	Senior	13; 64.11	10; 125.35	12; 189.46
20–22 November 2020	2020 Rostelecom Cup	Senior	8; 58.58	9; 109.27	9; 167.85
**2019–20 season**
Date	Event	Level	SP	FS	Total
2–8 March 2020	2020 World Junior Championships	Junior	13; 57.68	10; 112.21	10; 169.89
20–26 January 2020	2020 European Championships	Senior	6; 62.22	6; 119.27	6; 181.49
10–15 January 2020	2020 Winter Youth Olympics	Junior	9; 59.30	8; 110.07	8; 169.37
4–7 December 2019	2019 CS Golden Spin of Zagreb	Senior	6; 57.02	5; 119.49	5; 176.51
15–17 November 2019	2019 Rostelecom Cup	Senior	5; 64.01	6; 123.76	5; 187.77
5–10 November 2019	2019 Volvo Open Cup	Senior	3; 62.89	2; 115.34	2; 178.23
18–20 October 2019	2019 CS Ice Star	Senior	2; 58.39	3; 108.02	3; 166.41
9–12 October 2019	2019 Denis Ten Memorial Challenge	Senior	6; 53.41	4; 107.00	5; 160.41
19–21 September 2019	2019 CS Nepela Memorial	Senior	6; 56.40	3; 121.66	5; 178.06
**2018–19 season**
Date	Event	Level	SP	FS	Total
18–24 March 2019	2019 World Championships	Senior	17; 57.18	13; 122.70	13; 179.88
4–10 March 2019	2019 World Junior Championships	Junior	12; 54.28	12; 100.32	13; 154.60
21–27 January 2019	2019 European Championships	Senior	7; 59.95	13; 103.22	12; 163.17
5–8 December 2018	2018 CS Golden Spin of Zagreb	Senior	7; 57.28	6; 113.82	6; 171.10
26–29 November 2018	2018 CS Tallinn Trophy	Senior	17; 45.95	7; 111.25	8; 157.20
18–21 October 2018	2018 Minsk Arena Ice Star	Senior	3; 55.67	1; 106.86	1; 162.53
3–10 October 2018	2018 JGP Slovenia	Junior	6; 57.91	6; 109.16	6; 167.07
5–8 September 2018	2018 JGP Lithuania	Junior	7; 51.94	7; 99.70	6; 151.64
