= 2019 NHK Trophy =

Figure skating competition

- Type: Grand Prix
- Date: November 22 – 24
- Season: 2019–20
- Location: Sapporo
- Host: Japan Skating Federation
- Venue: Makomanai Ice Arena

Champions
- Men's singles: (Japan) Yuzuru Hanyu
- Ladies' singles: (Russia) Alena Kostornaia
- Pairs: (China) Sui Wenjing / Han Cong
- Ice dance: (France) Gabriella Papadakis / Guillaume Cizeron
- Previous: 2018 NHK Trophy
- Next: 2020 NHK Trophy
- Previous Grand Prix: 2019 Rostelecom Cup
- Next Grand Prix: 2019–20 Grand Prix Final

The 2019 NHK Trophy was the sixth event of the 2019–20 ISU Grand Prix of Figure Skating, a senior-level international invitational competition series. It was held at Makomanai Ice Arena in Sapporo, Japan from November 22–24. Medals were awarded in the disciplines of men's singles, ladies' singles, pair skating, and ice dance. Skaters earned points toward qualifying for the 2019–20 Grand Prix Final.

== Entries ==
The ISU announced the preliminary assignments on June 20, 2019.

Country	Men	Ladies	Pairs	Ice dance
Australia		Kailani Craine		
Canada	Conrad Orzel; Roman Sadovsky		Kirsten Moore-Towers / Michael Marinaro	Carolane Soucisse / Shane Firus
China			Sui Wenjing / Han Cong	Wang Shiyue / Liu Xinyu
France	Kévin Aymoz	Maé-Bérénice Méité		Gabriella Papadakis / Guillaume Cizeron
Great Britain				Lilah Fear / Lewis Gibson
Israel	Alexei Bychenko			
Italy			Nicole Della Monica / Matteo Guarise	Charlène Guignard / Marco Fabbri
Japan	Yuzuru Hanyu; Koshiro Shimada; Sōta Yamamoto	Rika Kihira; Mako Yamashita; Yuhana Yokoi	Riku Miura / Ryuichi Kihara	
Russia	Makar Ignatov; Anton Shulepov; Sergei Voronov	Alena Kostornaia; Sofia Samodurova; Alina Zagitova	Alisa Efimova / Alexander Korovin; Anastasia Mishina / Aleksandr Galliamov	Sofia Shevchenko / Igor Eremenko; Alexandra Stepanova / Ivan Bukin
South Korea		Lim Eun-soo		
United States	Jason Brown; Tomoki Hiwatashi	Starr Andrews; Karen Chen; Megan Wessenberg	Tarah Kayne / Danny O'Shea; Alexa Scimeca Knierim / Chris Knierim	Christina Carreira / Anthony Ponomarenko; Lorraine McNamara / Quinn Carpenter

=== Changes to preliminary assignments ===
Discipline	Withdrew		Added		Notes	Ref.
Discipline	Date	Skater(s)	Date	Skater(s)	Notes	Ref.
Men	—N/a		August 1	(Japan) Koshiro Shimada	Host picks	
Ladies	—N/a		August 1	(Japan) Yuhana Yokoi	Host picks	
Men	August 15	(Russia) Artur Dmitriev	August 23	(Russia) Anton Shulepov	Recovery	
Pairs	September 13	(France) Vanessa James / Morgan Ciprès	September 17	(Russia) Alisa Efimova / Alexander Korovin	Personal reasons	
Pairs	—N/a		September 17	(Japan) Riku Miura / Ryuichi Kihara	Host picks	
Men	October 2	(Russia) Mikhail Kolyada	October 9	(Russia) Makar Ignatov	Surgery	
Ladies	October 9	(United States) Ting Cui	October 14	(United States) Megan Wessenberg	Injury	
Ladies	November 5	(Finland) Viveca Lindfors	November 6	(Australia) Kailani Craine		
Ice dance	November 14	(Japan) Misato Komatsubara / Tim Koleto	—N/a		Recovery	

== Records ==
The following new ISU best scores were set during this competition:

Event	Component	Skater(s)	Score	Date	Ref
Ice dance	Rhythm dance	(France) Gabriella Papadakis / Guillaume Cizeron	90.03	November 22, 2019	
Pairs	Short program	(China) Sui Wenjing / Han Cong	81.27	November 22, 2019	
Ladies	Short program	(Russia) Alena Kostornaia	85.04	November 22, 2019	
Ice dance	Free dance	(France) Gabriella Papadakis / Guillaume Cizeron	136.58	November 23, 2019	
Ice dance	Total score	(France) Gabriella Papadakis / Guillaume Cizeron	226.61	November 23, 2019	

== Results ==
=== Men ===
Rank	Name	Nation	Total points	SP		FS	
1	Yuzuru Hanyu	Japan	305.05	1	109.34	1	195.71
2	Kévin Aymoz	France	250.02	2	91.47	3	158.55
3	Roman Sadovsky	Canada	247.50	4	78.51	2	168.99
4	Sergei Voronov	Russia	239.05	3	88.63	6	150.42
5	Jason Brown	United States	231.37	8	73.73	4	157.54
6	Sōta Yamamoto	Japan	226.27	7	74.88	5	151.39
7	Makar Ignatov	Russia	222.45	5	78.47	8	143.98
8	Anton Shulepov	Russia	218.38	9	71.76	7	146.62
9	Koshiro Shimada	Japan	213.65	6	75.98	10	137.67
10	Tomoki Hiwatashi	United States	207.30	11	64.54	9	142.76
11	Alexei Bychenko	Israel	197.63	12	61.97	11	135.66
12	Conrad Orzel	Canada	196.34	10	70.35	12	125.99

=== Ladies ===
The minutes before the free skating turned into chaos when Alena Kostornaia was not in the arena in time and her team led by coach Eteri Tutberidze was unable to make a contact with her. At the last moment, it turned out Kostornaia was sleeping in the hotel. Using a taxi she arrived after an off-ice warm-up, but won anyway ahead of Rika Kihira and Alina Zagitova.

Rank	Name	Nation	Total points	SP		FS	
1	Alena Kostornaia	Russia	240.00	1	85.04	1	154.96
2	Rika Kihira	Japan	231.84	2	79.89	2	151.95
3	Alina Zagitova	Russia	217.99	4	66.84	3	151.15
4	Yuhana Yokoi	Japan	189.54	8	62.67	4	126.87
5	Mako Yamashita	Japan	189.25	5	65.70	5	123.55
6	Sofia Samodurova	Russia	183.27	7	63.85	6	119.42
7	Lim Eun-soo	South Korea	172.47	6	65.28	10	107.19
8	Starr Andrews	United States	166.72	9	58.92	9	107.80
9	Karen Chen	United States	165.70	3	67.21	11	98.49
10	Kailani Craine	Australia	165.46	10	55.82	8	109.64
11	Maé-Bérénice Méité	France	159.98	11	49.77	7	110.21
12	Megan Wessenberg	United States	131.73	12	44.78	12	86.95

=== Pairs ===
Rank	Name	Nation	Total points	SP		FS	
1	Sui Wenjing / Han Cong	China	226.96	1	81.27	1	145.69
2	Kirsten Moore-Towers / Michael Marinaro	Canada	208.49	2	71.21	2	137.28
3	Anastasia Mishina / Aleksandr Galliamov	Russia	203.35	3	69.00	3	134.35
4	Alisa Efimova / Alexander Korovin	Russia	189.34	4	64.94	4	124.40
5	Riku Miura / Ryuichi Kihara	Japan	179.94	6	62.41	6	117.53
6	Tarah Kayne / Danny O'Shea	United States	178.73	7	58.70	5	120.03
7	Alexa Scimeca Knierim / Chris Knierim	United States	173.33	5	63.63	8	109.70
8	Nicole Della Monica / Matteo Guarise	Italy	171.43	8	57.55	7	113.88

=== Ice dance ===
Rank	Name	Nation	Total points	RD		FD	
1	Gabriella Papadakis / Guillaume Cizeron	France	226.61	1	90.03	1	136.58
2	Alexandra Stepanova / Ivan Bukin	Russia	208.81	2	84.07	2	124.74
3	Charlène Guignard / Marco Fabbri	Italy	198.06	3	82.13	4	115.93
4	Lilah Fear / Lewis Gibson	Great Britain	193.01	4	76.09	3	116.92
5	Wang Shiyue / Liu Xinyu	China	183.11	6	74.73	6	108.38
6	Christina Carreira / Anthony Ponomarenko	United States	182.26	5	75.25	7	107.01
7	Sofia Shevchenko / Igor Eremenko	Russia	178.08	7	69.59	5	108.49
8	Carolane Soucisse / Shane Firus	Canada	172.01	9	68.39	8	103.62
9	Lorraine McNamara / Quinn Carpenter	United States	170.21	8	68.80	9	101.41
