= Natalia Kaliszek =

Polish ice dancer

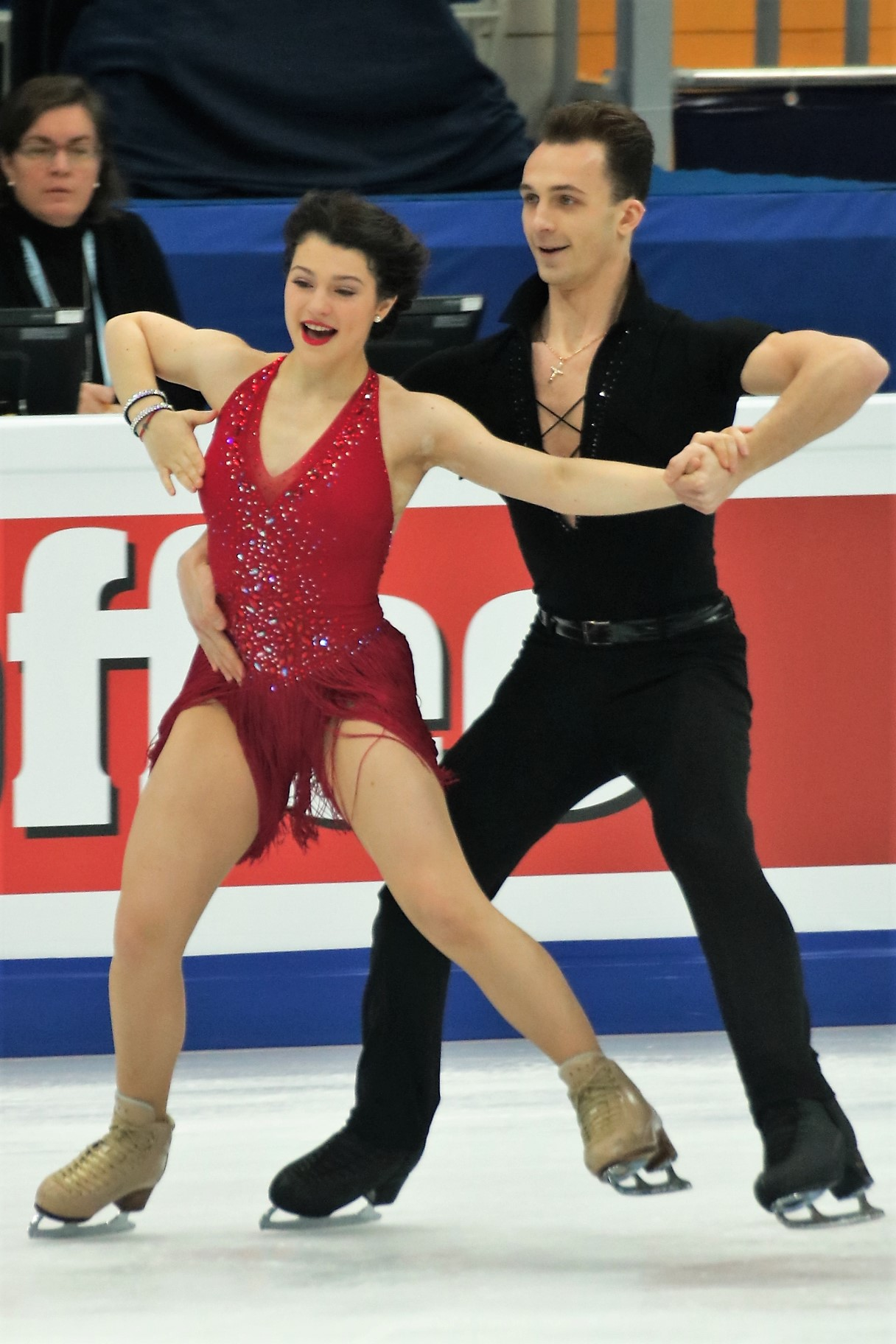
- Kaliszek and Spodyriev in 2018

Personal information
- Born: 17 May 1996 (age 30) Toruń, Poland
- Height: 1.60 m (5 ft 3 in)

Figure skating career
- Country: Poland
- Partner: Maksym Spodyriev
- Coach: Sylwia Nowak-Trębacka; Anastasia Vykhodtseva
- Skating club: MKS Axel Toruń
- Began skating: 2000
- Retired: 2022

Natalia Kaliszek (pronounced [naˈtalja kaˈliʂɛk]; born 17 May 1996) is a retired Polish ice dancer. With her skating partner, Maksym Spodyriev, she has won medals on the ISU Challenger Series, including gold at the 2017 CS Tallinn Trophy, and eight Polish national titles. They have represented Poland at the 2018 and 2022 Winter Olympics, as well as the European and World championships. At the junior level, they placed in the top ten at the 2015 Junior Worlds.

== Personal life ==
Natalia Kaliszek was born on 17 May 1996 in Toruń, Poland. She has two siblings, Michał and Anna, both of whom have competed in figure skating. In May 2022 she married Miłosz Wąsik, they have a baby born at the beginning of 2023.

== Early career ==
Natalia Kaliszek competed in ladies' singles as a child. In 2007, she teamed up with her brother, Michał Kaliszek, to compete in pair skating. In 2009, they appeared at two ISU Junior Grand Prix events, placing thirteenth and eighteenth.

In 2010, the two switched to ice dancing at the suggestion of Sylwia Nowak-Trębacka. In the 2011–2012 season, the Kaliszeks received two JGP assignments, finishing eleventh at both, and debuted on the senior level at the Pavel Roman Memorial, where they placed fifth. They were sent to the 2012 World Junior Championships in Minsk, Belarus, but were eliminated after the preliminary round. They trained in Toruń and ended their partnership after the 2012–2013 season.

In 2013, Kaliszek teamed up with Russian ice dancer Yaroslav Kurbakov. The two were coached by Nowak-Trębacka and represented Poland. They placed ninth and thirteenth at their JGP assignments and second at the Polish Junior Championships. They parted ways at the end of the season.

== Partnership with Spodyriev ==
=== 2014–2015 season ===
In 2014, Kaliszek began competing with Ukrainian ice dancer Maksym Spodyriev for Poland, coached by Nowak-Trębacka in Toruń. The two made their international debut at the Volvo Open Cup, where they took the junior silver medal. Switching to the senior level, they placed sixth at a Challenger Series (CS) event, the Warsaw Cup, before winning gold at the Santa Claus Cup. They won the Polish national title at the Four Nationals in December 2014 and took bronze the following month at the Toruń Cup.

Kaliszek/Spodyriev were selected to represent Poland at the European Championships, held in late January 2015 in Stockholm, Sweden. Ranked fifteenth in the short dance, they qualified to the free dance, where they placed fourteenth and rose to fourteenth overall. In early March, they made their second and final appearance on the junior level, competing at the World Junior Championships in Tallinn, Estonia; they placed tenth in the short dance, sixth in the free dance, and seventh overall. Later in March, they traveled to Shanghai, China, for the World Championships but were eliminated after placing twenty-fourth in the short dance.

=== 2015–2016 season ===
Kaliszek/Spodyriev competed in three 2015–16 Challenger Series competitions. After placing seventh at the Nebelhorn Trophy, they won bronze at the Mordovian Ornament and silver at the Warsaw Cup. They finished third in the Challenger Series ranking.

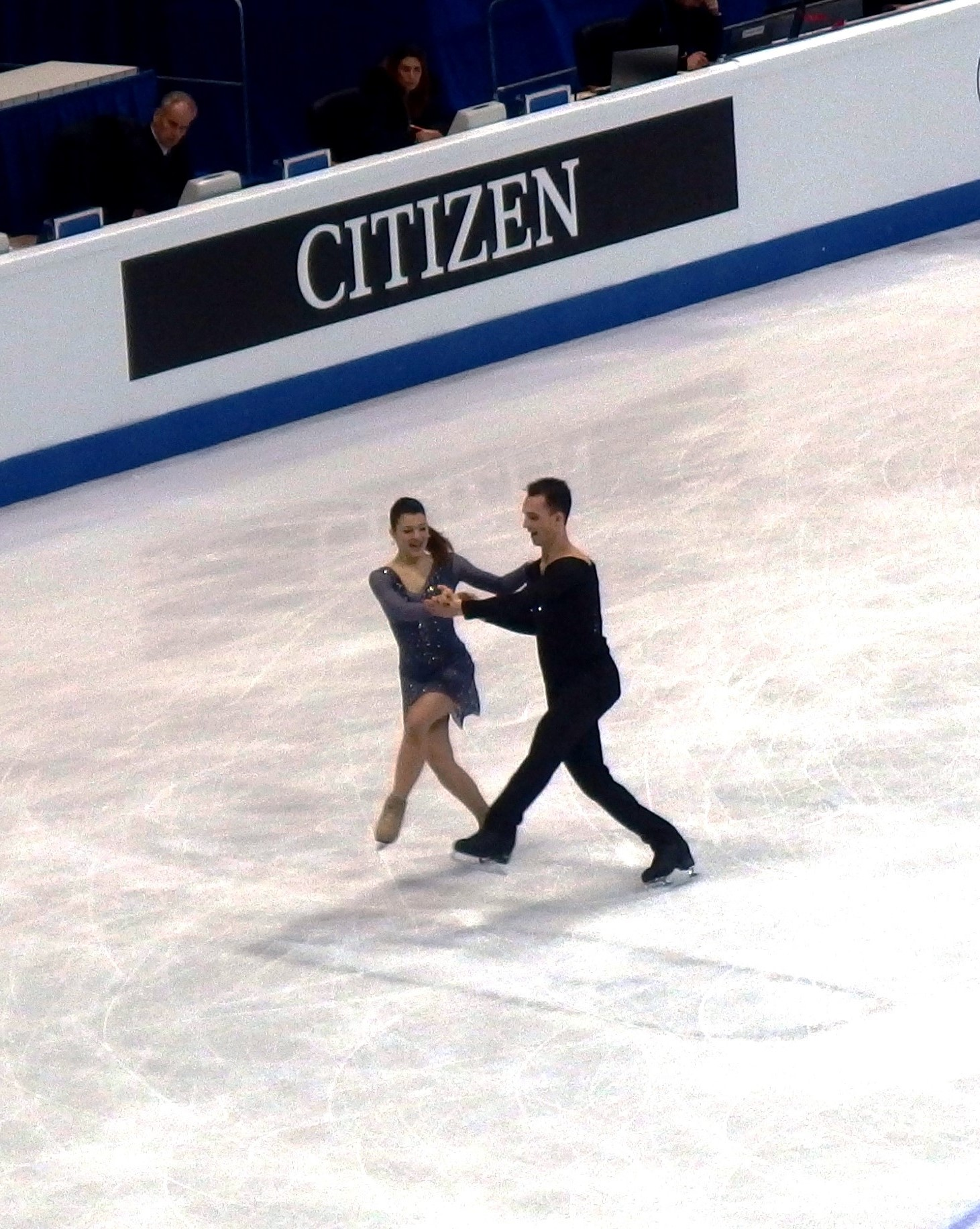
Kaliszek with Spodyriev in the free dance at the 2016 European Championships

Kaliszek/Spodyriev placed eleventh at the 2016 European Championships in Bratislava, having ranked eleventh in both segments. At the 2016 World Championships in Boston, they placed fourteenth in the short dance, sixteenth in the free dance, and sixteenth overall. At the end of May 2016, it was announced that the International Skating Union had chosen the foxtrot portion of their short dance to become a pattern dance.

=== 2016–2017 season ===
Starting their season on the Challenger Series, Kaliszek/Spodyriev placed fourth at the 2016 CS Ondrej Nepela Memorial and fifth at the 2016 CS Finlandia Trophy, in early October. During training in early November, they had a fall related to poor rink conditions in Toruń, which resulted in her blade cutting two of his fingers. Later in the same month, they debuted on the Grand Prix series, having received invitations to two events. The duo finished fifth at the 2016 Cup of China and seventh at the 2016 NHK Trophy.

In January 2017, Kaliszek/Spodyriev finished 8th at the European Championships in Ostrava, Czech Republic. In March, they placed fifteenth in the short, thirteenth in the free, and fourteenth overall at the 2017 World Championships in Helsinki, Finland. Due to their result, Poland qualified a spot in the ice dancing event at the 2018 Winter Olympics in Pyeongchang, South Korea.

=== 2017–2018 season ===
Kaliszek/Spodyriev began the season with a tenth-place finish at the 2017 CS Finlandia Trophy, the first of two Challenger events the team would take on that year. On the Grand Prix, they placed ninth at Skate Canada and eighth at the Internationaux de France. Following the end of the Grand Prix, they won gold at the 2017 CS Tallinn Trophy, followed by a bronze medal at the Santa Claus Cup. They repeated as champions at the Polish Figure Skating Championships for the fourth consecutive time and were named to Poland's Olympic team, as well as to the European and World championships.

Competing at the 2018 European Championships, Kaliszek/Spodyriev placed tenth. Competing at the 2018 Winter Olympics ice dance event, they placed fourteenth in the short dance. Kaliszek/Spodyriev were one of three teams in the competition whose rhumba pattern dance made use of the song "Despacito", along with South Koreans Yura Min / Alexander Gamelin and the Chinese team of Wang Shiyue / Liu Xinyu. The effect of the song's ubiquity was heightened further because Kaliszek/Spodyriev and the Min/Gamelin skated consecutively and attracted comments on social and entertainment media. The duo qualified for the free dance, placing fifteenth and fourteenth overall. They concluded the season at the 2018 World Championships in Milan, Italy, where they placed seventeenth.

=== 2018–2019 season ===
The 2018 CS Nebelhorn Trophy marked Kaliszek/Spodyriev's first event of the new season, placing eighth. On the Grand Prix, they placed sixth at Skate America and fifth at the Rostelecom Cup. Following the Grand Prix, they competed at the 2018 Warsaw Cup, winning the silver medal behind Tiffany Zahorski / Jonathan Guerreiro. They went on to compete in two more Challenger events, winning the bronze medal at the Tallinn Trophy and silver at Golden Spin. In December, Kaliszek/Spodyriev won their fifth national title.

Competing in the rhythm dance at the 2019 European Championships, they placed fourth and were the only team to receive a perfect score on the Tango Romantica pattern dance. They placed fifth in the free dance and fifth overall. They placed eleventh at the 2019 World Championships.

=== 2019–2020 season ===
The pattern dance based on Kaliszek and Spodyriev's 2015–16 "Tea for Two" short dance, formally known as the Tea Time Foxtrot, was adopted for use in the junior international competitive season. Kaliszek and Spodyriev spent much of the preseason teaching the dance at seminars for junior dance teams.

Beginning the season at the 2019 Shanghai Trophy, they won the bronze medal there before winning silver at the 2019 CS Ice Star. On the Grand Prix, they placed sixth at the 2019 Internationaux de France. At the 2019 Rostelecom Cup, they placed fourth in the rhythm dance despite a serious error on the Finnstep pattern dance, exiting hold midway through. They remained in fourth place overall following the free dance.

Polish champions again, Kaliszek/Spodyriev, finished the season at the 2020 European Championships, where they placed ninth. They had been assigned to compete at the World Championships in Montreal, but these were cancelled as a result of the coronavirus pandemic.

=== 2020–2021 season ===
With the pandemic limited international opportunities, Kaliszek/Spodyriev won the Four National Championships again before competing at the 2021 World Championships in Stockholm, where they placed twelfth. This qualified one berth for a Polish dance team at the 2022 Winter Olympics.

=== 2021–2022 season ===
Kaliszek/Spodyriev began the new season on the Grand Prix at 2021 Skate America, where they finished eighth. They withdrew from several other events, including the 2021 Rostelecom Cup, before winning the Polish national title again. They were named to the Polish Olympic team for the second time and then competed at the 2022 European Championships, finishing fourteenth.

Competing at the 2022 Winter Olympics in the dance event, Kaliszek/Spodyriev were fifteenth in the rhythm dance. Kaliszek fell at the end of their program, as a result of which they placed last in the free dance and dropped to seventeenth overall.

Spodyriev's native country, Kaliszek and Spodyriev's club welcomed many refugee Ukrainian skaters, notably fellow ice dancers Oleksandra Nazarova and Maksym Nikitin. The duo were scheduled to compete at the 2022 World Championships, but withdrew after a positive COVID test.

On July 16, they announced their retirement from competitive figure skating.

== Programs ==
=== With Spodyriev ===
Season	Short dance	Free dance	Exhibition
2021–2022	Blues: Quick Musical Doodles by Two Feet; Hip Hop: Glory by The Score	Heart Cry by Perpetual Emotions; Natural by Imagine Dragons	
2020–2021	Quickstep: Everybody Say Yeah; Foxtrot: Everybody Say Yeah (from Kinky Boots) by Cyndi Lauper performed by Billy Porter, Stark Sands	Heart Cry by Perpetual Emotions; Natural by Imagine Dragons	
2019–2020	Quickstep: Everybody Say Yeah; Foxtrot: Everybody Say Yeah (from Kinky Boots) by Cyndi Lauper performed by Billy Porter, Stark Sands	(I've Had) The Time of My Life performed by Bill Medley & Jennifer Warnes (from Dirty Dancing); Do You Love Me by The Contours	I'll Never Love Again from A Star Is Born by Lady Gaga
2018–2019	Tango: Passion for Tango	Bout Time by Crystalize; I Feel Like I'm Drowning by Two Feet; Bout Time by Crystalize	
2017–2018	Samba: Despacito by Luis Fonsi; Rhumba: Deja Vu by Prince Royce, Shakira; Salsa: Descarga En Sol Para Tito Puente by Alex Torres, Los Reyes Latinos	Young And Beautiful (from The Great Gatsby); Swing Break by The McMash Clan feat. Kate Mullins; No Diggity by Minimatic; Maple Leaf Rag by Skeewiff feat. Tommy Dorsey	Just Give Me a Reason by Pink and Nate Ruess
2016–2017	Blues: Back to the Dirty Town by Blues Mystery; Hip hop: Sax by Fleur East	(I've Had) The Time of My Life performed by Bill Medley & Jennifer Warnes (from Dirty Dancing); Do You Love Me by The Contours	All of Me by John Legend; Just Give Me a Reason by Pink and Nate Ruess
2015–2016	Waltz: Rain Waltz by Frederic Chopin; Foxtrot: Tea For Two	Crystallize	
2014–2015	Paso doble: Puss in Boots by Henry Jackman	Phantom of the Opera on Ice by Roberto Danova	Snow by Philipp Kirkorov

=== With Kurbakov ===
Season	Short dance	Free dance
2013–2014	Quickstep: That Man by Caro Emerald; Foxtrot: Can't Smile Without You by Barry Manilow; Quickstep: That Man by Caro Emerald	La valse du mariage (from Rider on the Rain) by Francis Lai; Luna Caliente by Astor Piazzolla

=== With Michał Kaliszek ===
Season	Short dance	Free dance
2011–2012	Cha Cha: Angelina by Lou Bega	Alegría (Cirque du Soleil) by René Dupéré
	Short program	Free skating
2009–2010		Cinema Paradiso by Ennio Morricone, Andrea Morricone
2008–2009	The Pink Panther by Henry Mancini	

== Competitive highlights ==
GP: Grand Prix; CS: Challenger Series; JGP: Junior Grand Prix

=== With Spodyriev ===
International
Event	14–15	15–16	16–17	17–18	18–19	19–20	20–21	21–22
Olympics				14th				17th
Worlds	24th	16th	14th	17th	11th	C	12th	WD
Europeans	14th	11th	8th	10th	5th	9th		14th
GP Cup of China			5th					
GP France				8th		6th		
GP NHK Trophy			7th					
GP Rostelecom					5th	4th		WD
GP Skate America					6th			8th
GP Skate Canada				9th				
CS Cup of Austria								WD
CS Finlandia			5th	10th				
CS Golden Spin					2nd			
CS Ice Star						2nd		
CS Mordovian		3rd						
CS Nebelhorn		7th			8th			
CS Nepela			4th					
CS Tallinn Trophy				1st	3rd			
CS Warsaw Cup	6th	2nd					WD	WD
Bosphorus Cup						1st		
Open d'Andorra		2nd						
Santa Claus Cup	1st			3rd				
Shanghai Trophy						3rd		
Toruń Cup	3rd	1st	1st	1st	2nd	1st		
Warsaw Cup					2nd			
International: Junior
Junior Worlds	7th							
Volvo Open Cup	2nd							
National
Polish Champ.	1st	1st	1st	1st	1st	1st	1st	1st
Four Nationals	2nd	2nd	1st	1st	1st	1st	1st	1st
TBD = Assigned; WD = Withdrew; C = Event cancelled

=== With Kurbakov ===
International
Event	2013–14
JGP Czech Republic	13th
JGP Poland	9th
Ice Star	3rd J
Santa Claus Cup	3rd J
Toruń Cup	2nd J
National
Polish Championships	2nd J
J = Junior level

=== With Michał Kaliszek ===
==== Ice dancing ====
International
Event	2010–11	2011–12	2012–13
NRW Trophy			12th
Pavel Roman Memorial		5th	
Toruń Cup		4th	
International: Junior
World Junior Champ.		28th	
JGP Estonia		11th	
JGP Poland		11th	
National
Polish Champ.	2nd J	2nd	3rd
J = Junior level

==== Pair skating ====
International
Event	2007–08	2008–09	2009–10
JGP Germany			18th
JGP Poland			13th
Ice Challenge			4th J
Nebelhorn Trophy	1st N		
NRW Trophy	3rd N		
Toruń Cup	1st N	3rd J	2nd J
Warsaw Cup	3rd N		3rd J
National or regional
Polish Champ.			4th
Polish Junior Champ.	1st N*	1st	3rd
Polish Youth Olympics		1st J	
Mazovia Cup	1st N	1st J	2nd J
International Czech Champ.		2nd J	
Levels: J = Junior; N = Novice * Competed unofficially.
