= 2019 Rostelecom Cup =

Figure skating competition

- Type: Grand Prix
- Date: November 15 – 17
- Season: 2019–20
- Location: Moscow
- Host: Figure Skating Federation of Russia
- Venue: Megasport Sport Palace

Champions
- Men's singles: (Russia) Alexander Samarin
- Ladies' singles: (Russia) Alexandra Trusova
- Pairs: (Russia) Aleksandra Boikova / Dmitrii Kozlovskii
- Ice dance: (Russia) Victoria Sinitsina / Nikita Katsalapov
- Previous: 2018 Rostelecom Cup
- Next: 2020 Rostelecom Cup
- Previous GP: 2019 Cup of China
- Next GP: 2019 NHK Trophy

The 2019 Rostelecom Cup was the fifth event of the 2019–20 ISU Grand Prix of Figure Skating, a senior-level international invitational competition series. It was held at Megasport Sport Palace in Moscow, Russia from November 15–17. Medals were awarded in the disciplines of men's singles, ladies' singles, pair skating, and ice dance. Skaters earned points toward qualifying for the 2019–20 Grand Prix Final.

== Entries ==
The ISU announced the preliminary assignments on June 20, 2019.

Country	Men	Ladies	Pairs	Ice dance
Austria			Miriam Ziegler / Severin Kiefer	
Azerbaijan	Vladimir Litvintsev	Ekaterina Ryabova		
Canada	Nam Nguyen		Evelyn Walsh / Trennt Michaud	Piper Gilles / Paul Poirier; Marjorie Lajoie / Zachary Lagha
China		Chen Hongyi		
Czech Republic	Michal Březina			
Finland		Emmi Peltonen		
France				Adelina Galyavieva / Louis Thauron
Germany		Nicole Schott	Minerva Fabienne Hase / Nolan Seegert	
Georgia	Morisi Kvitelashvili			
Israel	Daniel Samohin			
Italy			Rebecca Ghilardi / Filippo Ambrosini	Jasmine Tessari / Francesco Fioretti
Japan	Kazuki Tomono; Shoma Uno	Satoko Miyahara; Yuna Shiraiwa; Yuhana Yokoi		
Latvia	Deniss Vasiļjevs			
Lithuania				Allison Reed / Saulius Ambrulevičius
Poland				Natalia Kaliszek / Maksym Spodyriev
Russia	Dmitri Aliev; Makar Ignatov; Alexander Samarin	Stanislava Konstantinova; Evgenia Medvedeva; Alexandra Trusova	Aleksandra Boikova / Dmitrii Kozlovskii; Ksenia Stolbova / Andrei Novoselov; Evgenia Tarasova / Vladimir Morozov	Anastasia Shpilevaya / Grigory Smirnov; Victoria Sinitsina / Nikita Katsalapov; Anastasia Skoptcova / Kirill Aleshin
Spain				Sara Hurtado / Kirill Khaliavin
Switzerland		Alexia Paganini		
United States	Alexei Krasnozhon	Mariah Bell	Audrey Lu / Misha Mitrofanov	

=== Changes to preliminary assignments ===
Discipline	Withdrew		Added		Notes	Ref.
Discipline	Date	Skater(s)	Date	Skater(s)	Notes	Ref.
Men	—		September 17	(Russia) Makar Ignatov	Host picks	
Pairs	—		September 17	(Russia) Ksenia Stolbova / Andrei Novoselov	Host picks	
Ice dance	—		September 17	(Russia) Anastasia Shpilevaya / Grigory Smirnov	Host picks	
Ice dance	October 1	(Finland) Juulia Turkkila / Matthias Versluis	October 11	(Italy) Jasmine Tessari / Francesco Fioretti	Injury (Turkkila)	
Ladies	October 14	(Belgium) Loena Hendrickx	October 14	(Finland) Emmi Peltonen	Injury	
Men	October 22	(United States) Vincent Zhou	October 23	(Israel) Daniel Samohin	Personal reasons	
Ladies	November 4	(France) Laurine Lecavelier	November 5	(Germany) Nicole Schott	Medical reasons	

== Results ==
=== Men ===
Rank	Name	Nation	Total points	SP		FS	
1	Alexander Samarin	Russia	264.45	1	92.81	1	171.64
2	Dmitri Aliev	Russia	259.88	2	90.64	2	169.24
3	Makar Ignatov	Russia	252.87	3	87.54	3	165.33
4	Shoma Uno	Japan	252.24	4	87.29	4	164.95
5	Nam Nguyen	Canada	246.20	6	87.01	6	159.19
6	Deniss Vasiļjevs	Latvia	241.09	5	87.08	10	154.01
7	Morisi Kvitelashvili	Georgia	237.59	9	75.87	5	161.72
8	Kazuki Tomono	Japan	237.54	7	80.98	7	156.56
9	Michal Březina	Czech Republic	236.47	8	80.27	8	156.20
10	Alexei Krasnozhon	United States	216.28	10	75.46	11	140.82
11	Vladimir Litvintsev	Azerbaijan	209.07	12	54.42	9	154.65
WD	Daniel Samohin	Israel	withdrew	11	56.94	withdrew from competition	

=== Ladies ===
Rank	Name	Nation	Total points	SP		FS	
1	Alexandra Trusova	Russia	234.47	2	74.21	1	160.26
2	Evgenia Medvedeva	Russia	225.76	1	76.93	2	148.83
3	Mariah Bell	United States	205.67	3	67.11	3	138.56
4	Satoko Miyahara	Japan	192.42	6	63.09	4	129.33
5	Ekaterina Ryabova	Azerbaijan	187.77	5	64.01	6	123.76
6	Yuhana Yokoi	Japan	182.68	10	56.51	5	126.17
7	Alexia Paganini	Switzerland	179.69	4	65.12	9	114.57
8	Chen Hongyi	China	175.77	9	57.17	7	118.60
9	Nicole Schott	Germany	172.08	8	57.29	8	114.79
10	Yuna Shiraiwa	Japan	170.03	7	60.57	10	109.46
11	Stanislava Konstantinova	Russia	156.94	11	54.36	11	102.58
12	Emmi Peltonen	Finland	152.50	12	52.46	12	100.04

=== Pairs ===
Rank	Name	Nation	Total points	SP		FS	
1	Aleksandra Boikova / Dmitrii Kozlovskii	Russia	229.48	1	80.14	1	149.34
2	Evgenia Tarasova / Vladimir Morozov	Russia	216.77	2	76.81	2	139.96
3	Minerva Fabienne Hase / Nolan Seegert	Germany	186.16	4	67.74	4	118.42
4	Miriam Ziegler / Severin Kiefer	Austria	182.02	6	61.84	3	120.18
5	Ksenia Stolbova / Andrei Novoselov	Russia	177.51	3	68.74	5	108.77
6	Evelyn Walsh / Trennt Michaud	Canada	168.96	5	62.76	7	106.20
7	Rebecca Ghilardi / Filippo Ambrosini	Italy	162.76	7	55.08	6	107.68
8	Audrey Lu / Misha Mitrofanov	United States	153.61	8	54.03	8	99.58

=== Ice dance ===
Rank	Name	Nation	Total points	RD		FD	
1	Victoria Sinitsina / Nikita Katsalapov	Russia	212.15	1	86.09	1	126.06
2	Piper Gilles / Paul Poirier	Canada	207.64	2	82.56	2	125.08
3	Sara Hurtado / Kirill Khaliavin	Spain	185.01	3	72.01	3	113.00
4	Natalia Kaliszek / Maksym Spodyriev	Poland	178.70	4	69.97	4	108.73
5	Allison Reed / Saulius Ambrulevičius	Lithuania	175.43	5	69.79	6	105.64
6	Anastasia Shpilevaya / Grigory Smirnov	Russia	172.93	6	67.04	5	105.89
7	Marjorie Lajoie / Zachary Lagha	Canada	169.90	8	64.70	7	105.20
8	Adelina Galyavieva / Louis Thauron	France	164.79	9	63.22	8	101.57
9	Anastasia Skoptcova / Kirill Aleshin	Russia	164.64	7	66.52	9	98.12
10	Jasmine Tessari / Francesco Fioretti	Italy	154.44	10	62.68	10	91.76
