= Grigory Smirnov =

Russian ice dancer (born 1997)

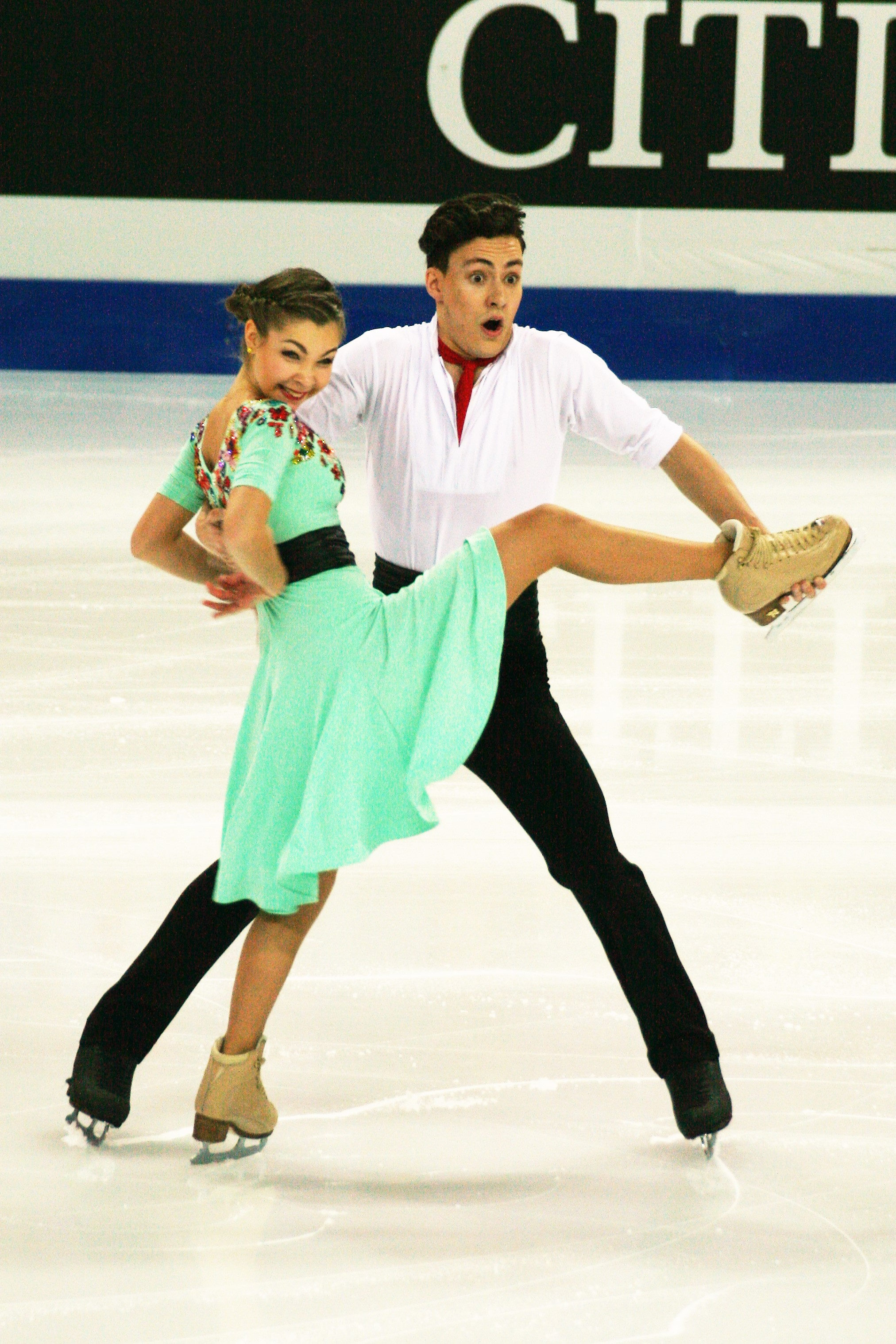
- Shpilevaya/Smirnov at the 2016−17 JGP Final

Personal information
- Native name: Григорий Сергеевич Смирнов
- Full name: Grigory Sergeyevich Smirnov
- Born: 1 April 1997 (age 29) Nizhny Novgorod, Russia
- Height: 1.77 m (5 ft 9 1/2 in)

Figure skating career
- Country: United States
- Partner: Avonley Nguyen
- Coach: Igor Shpilband, Pasquale Camerlengo
- Skating club: SC of New York
- Began skating: 2002
- Retired: August 20, 2022
Medal record
Representing Russia
Figure skating: Ice dancing
Winter Youth Olympics
Gold medal – first place	2016 Lillehammer	Ice dancing

Grigory Sergeyevich Smirnov (Russian: Григорий Сергеевич Смирнов, born 1 April 1997) is a Russian retired ice dancer who competed for the United States. With his former skating partner, Anastasia Shpilevaya, competing for Russia, he is the 2019 Bavarian Open champion, 2016 Youth Olympic champion, and 2017 Russian junior national champion.

During the 2021–22, he competed with Avonley Nguyen for the United States. He did not represent the US in international competition.

== Personal life ==
Grigory Sergeyevich Smirnov was born on 1 April 1997 in Nizhny Novgorod, Russia. He resides in Moscow.

== Career ==
=== Early years ===
Smirnov began learning to skate in 2002. He competed with Yulia Borisova in the 2010–11 season and with Valeria Neyman in 2011–12.

Smirnov teamed up with Anastasia Shpilevaya ahead of the 2012–13 season. Competing on the junior level, they placed fifth at the Ice Challenge and won silver at the Pavel Roman Memorial. The following season, they qualified for the 2014 Russian Junior Championships, where they finished seventh.

=== 2014–2015 season ===
Shpilevaya/Smirnov received their first ISU Junior Grand Prix (JGP) assignments in the 2014–15 season. They won bronze in late August at the JGP in Courchevel, France, but finished ninth the following month in Tallinn, Estonia. The two placed fifth at the 2015 Russian Junior Championships.

=== 2015–2016 season ===
Shpilevaya/Smirnov's first event of the 2015 JGP series took place in October in Logroño, Spain. They finished fourth, outscored for the bronze medal by Elliana Pogrebinsky / Alex Benoit, resulting in the loss of their provisional assignment to Zagreb, Croatia. In January 2016, they won the bronze medal at the Russian Junior Championships, behind Alla Loboda / Pavel Drozd and Betina Popova / Yuri Vlasenko. They were named in Russia's teams to the Youth Olympics and World Junior Championships.

In February, Shpilevaya/Smirnov won gold at the 2016 Winter Youth Olympics in Hamar, Norway, having placed first in both segments. Assigned to Team Courage for the mixed NOC team event, they placed first in their segment and their team finished sixth. On March 15–20, they competed at the 2016 World Junior Championships in Debrecen, Hungary where they finished fifth.

=== 2016–2017 season ===
In the 2016–17 Season, Shpilevaya/Smirnov's first JGP assignment was at the 2016 JGP Japan where they won the silver medal with a total score of 151.50 points. A month later they achieved their second silver of the season at the 2016 JGP Germany. With two silver medals they qualified for the 2016−17 JGP Final where they placed sixth.

In February 2017 Shpilevaya/Smirnov won the gold medal at the 2017 Russian Junior Championships after placing second in the short dance and 1st in the free dance. They beat the silver medalist and the favourites, Alla Loboda / Pavel Drozd, by almost 6 points, mainly due to the costly fall that Lododa had in the free dance.

In March 2017 they competed at the 2017 World Junior Championships where they finished fourth after placing fourth in both the short dance and free dance. At these championships they scored their personal best score of 152.66 points.

=== 2017–2018 season ===
In the 2017–18 Season, Shpilevaya/Smirnov's first JGP assignment was at the 2016 JGP Latvia where they won the silver medal behind their teammates and training partners, Sofia Shevchenko / Igor Eremenko. Due to Smirnov's injury, which required a surgery, they had to skip the rest of the season.

=== 2018–2019 season ===
Shpilevaya/Smirnov started their season by competing in two ISU Challenger Series events. In early October they made their international senior debut at the 2018 CS Finlandia Trophy where they finished fifth and in mid-November, they competed at the 2018 CS Alpen Trophy where they placed fourth. They placed sixth at the 2019 Russian Championships.

=== 2019–2020 & 2020–2021 seasons ===
Beginning the season with two Challenger assignments, Shpilevaya/Smirnov placed fourth at 2019 CS Lombardia Trophy and then sixth at 2019 CS Finlandia Trophy. Making their Grand Prix debut, they placed sixth at the 2019 Rostelecom Cup. At the 2020 Russian Championships, they placed ninth.

In September 2020, it was announced that the pair had split due to Shpilevaya's inability to practice due to the lasting effects of a severe case of COVID-19.

=== 2021–2022 season ===
In September 2021, it was confirmed that Smirnov had switched federations to compete with American ice dancer Avonley Nguyen for the United States after Shpilevaya was forced to end her career. They were scheduled to make their U.S. Championship debut in January 2022, but withdrew after Smirnov suffered a hip injury.

On August 20, 2022, Smirnov announced he had retired and was now coaching.

== Programs ==
=== With Nguyen ===
Season	Rhythm dance	Free dance	Exhibition
2021–2022	I Want It That Way; Everybody (Backstreet's Back) by Backstreet Boys	Dusk Till Dawn by Zayn, feat. Sia	

=== With Shpilevaya ===
Season	Rhythm dance	Free dance
2019–2020	Hopelessly Devoted to You (from Grease) by John Farrar performed by Olivia Newton-John; You're the One That I Want (from Grease) by John Farrar performed by John Travolta, Olivia Newton-John	How to Steal a Diamond by Quincy Jones
2018–2019	Tango Amore by Edvin Marton	Skeletons by Drehz; Thunder by Imagine Dragons; Neverland by Drehz
	Short dance	
2017–2018	Cha Cha: Kiss performed by Tom Jones; Samba: Baila Baila Conmigo performed by Domino	Love Story
2016–2017	Blues: Ain't No Sunshine; Swing: Air Mail Special by Ella Fitzgerald Club des Belugas remix	Che Ne Parliamo A Fa by Renzo Arbore, Lino Banfi; 'O sole mio by Filippa Giordano; C'è la luna mezzo mare by Patrizio Buanne
2015–2016	Foxtrot: Somewhere, My Love performed by Frank Sinatra; Waltz: Die Fledermaus by Johann Strauss II	The Umbrellas of Cherbourg by Michel Legrand; Lawrence of Arabia by Maurice Jarre
2014–2015	Samba: Rhumba: Tongue Twister; Samba:	Out of My Mind by Raphael Gualazzi; Bye, Bye Johnny by Robert Wells
2012–2013	Blues: Mess Around by Ahmet Ertegun performed by Ray Charles	Follia d'amore by Raphael Gualazzi

== Competitive highlights ==
GP: Grand Prix; CS: Challenger Series; JGP: Junior Grand Prix

=== With Shpilevaya for Russia ===
International
Event	12–13	13–14	14–15	15–16	16–17	17–18	18–19	19–20
GP Rostelecom Cup								6th
CS Alpen Trophy							4th	
CS Finlandia							5th	6th
CS Lombardia								4th
Bavarian Open							1st	
Universiade							5th	
International: Junior
Junior Worlds				5th	4th			
Youth Olympics				1st				
JGP Final					6th			
JGP Estonia			9th					
JGP France			3rd					
JGP Germany					2nd			
JGP Japan					2nd			
JGP Latvia						2nd		
JGP Spain				4th				
Denkova-Staviski				1st				
Ice Challenge	5th							
Ice Star					1st			
Pavel Roman	2nd							
Volvo Open Cup			1st					
National
Russia							6th	9th
Russia, Junior		7th	5th	3rd	1st	WD		
Team events
Youth Olympics				6th T 1st P				
TBD = Assigned; WD = Withdrew; T = Team result; P = Personal result. Medals awarded for team result only.

== Detailed results ==
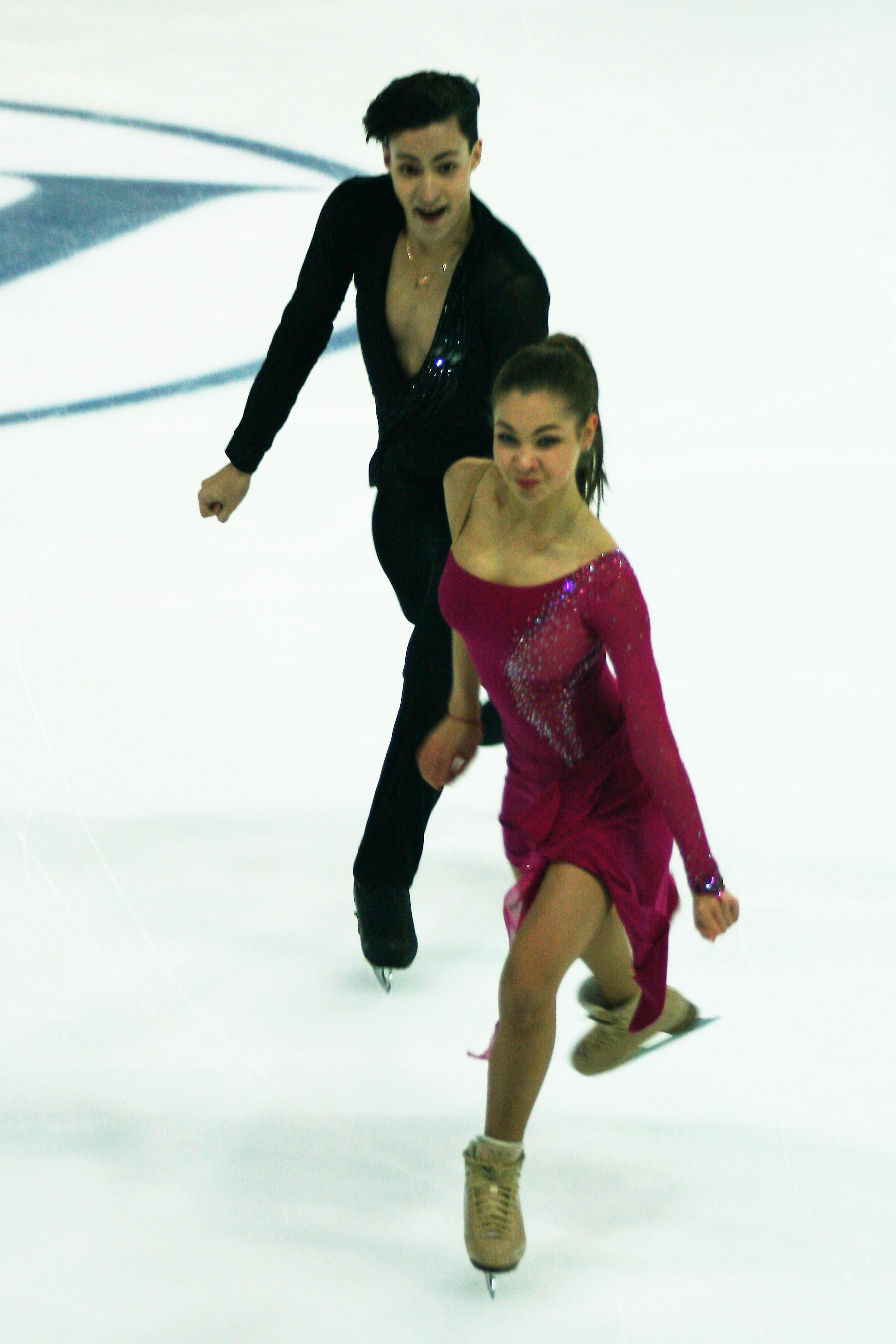
Shpilevaya/Smirnov at the 2016–17 Junior Grand Prix Final

With Shpilevaya

2019–20 season
Date	Event	RD	FD	Total
24–29 December 2019	2020 Russian Championships	8; 70.34	9; 105.33	9; 175.67
15–17 November 2019	2019 Rostelecom Cup	6; 67.04	5; 105.89	6; 172.93
11–13 October 2019	2019 CS Finlandia Trophy	6; 68.04	5; 97.77	6; 165.81
13–15 September 2019	2019 CS Lombardia Trophy	6; 67.04	5; 103.58	4; 170.62
2018–19 season
Date	Event	RD	FD	Total
7–9 March 2019	2019 Winter Universiade	6; 62.19	5; 104.63	5; 166.82
5–10 February 2019	2019 Bavarian Open	3; 65.00	1; 108.55	1; 173.55
19–23 December 2018	2019 Russian Championships	7; 68.00	6; 105.23	6; 173.23
11–18 November 2018	2018 CS Alpen Trophy	4; 63.43	5; 95.22	4; 158.65
4–7 October 2018	2018 CS Finlandia Trophy	5; 64.33	4; 103.61	5; 167.94

2017–18 season
Date	Event	Level	SD	FD	Total
6–9 September 2017	2017 JGP Latvia	Junior	1; 60.11	2; 79.72	2; 139.83
2016–17 season
Date	Event	Level	SD	FD	Total
15–19 March 2017	2017 World Junior Championships	Junior	4; 63.26	4; 89.40	4; 152.66
1–5 February 2017	2017 Russian Junior Championships	Junior	2; 67.71	1; 96.17	1; 163.88
8–11 December 2016	2016−17 JGP Final	Junior	6; 59.29	6; 81.35	6; 140.64
18–20 November 2016	2016 Ice Star	Junior	1; 66.49	1; 93.43	1; 159.92
5–9 October 2016	2016 JGP Germany	Junior	2; 61.00	2; 87.02	2; 148.02
7–11 September 2016	2016 JGP Japan	Junior	2; 60.88	2; 90.62	2; 151.50
2015–16 season
Date	Event	Level	SD	FD	Total
14–20 March 2016	2016 World Junior Championships	Junior	4; 59.15	6; 87.40	5; 146.55
12–21 February 2016	2016 Winter Youth Olympics - Team Event	Junior	-	1; 86.48	6
12–21 February 2016	2016 Winter Youth Olympics	Junior	1; 57.93	1; 83.95	1; 141.88
19–23 January 2016	2016 Russian Junior Championships	Junior	2; 63.73	3; 92.23	3; 155.96
20–25 October 2015	2015 Denkova-Staviski Cup	Junior	1; 57.78	1; 90.33	1; 148.11
30 September – 4 October 2015	2015 JGP Spain	Junior	4; 57.15	4; 83.24	4; 140.39
2014–15 season
Date	Event	Level	SD	FD	Total
4–7 February 2015	2015 Russian Junior Championships	Junior	4; 55.47	4; 84.39	5; 139.86
5–9 November 2014	2014 Volvo Open Cup	Junior	1; 57.05	1; 82.96	1; 140.01
24–28 September 2014	2014 JGP Estonia	Junior	8; 42.96	9; 68.70	9; 111.66
20–24 August 2014	2014 JGP France	Junior	3; 47.94	4; 73.48	3; 121.42
2013–14 season
Date	Event	Level	SD	FD	Total
22–25 January 2014	2014 Russian Junior Championships	Junior	6; 56.96	7; 75.52	7; 132.48
