= Makar Ignatov =

Russian figure skater (born 2000)

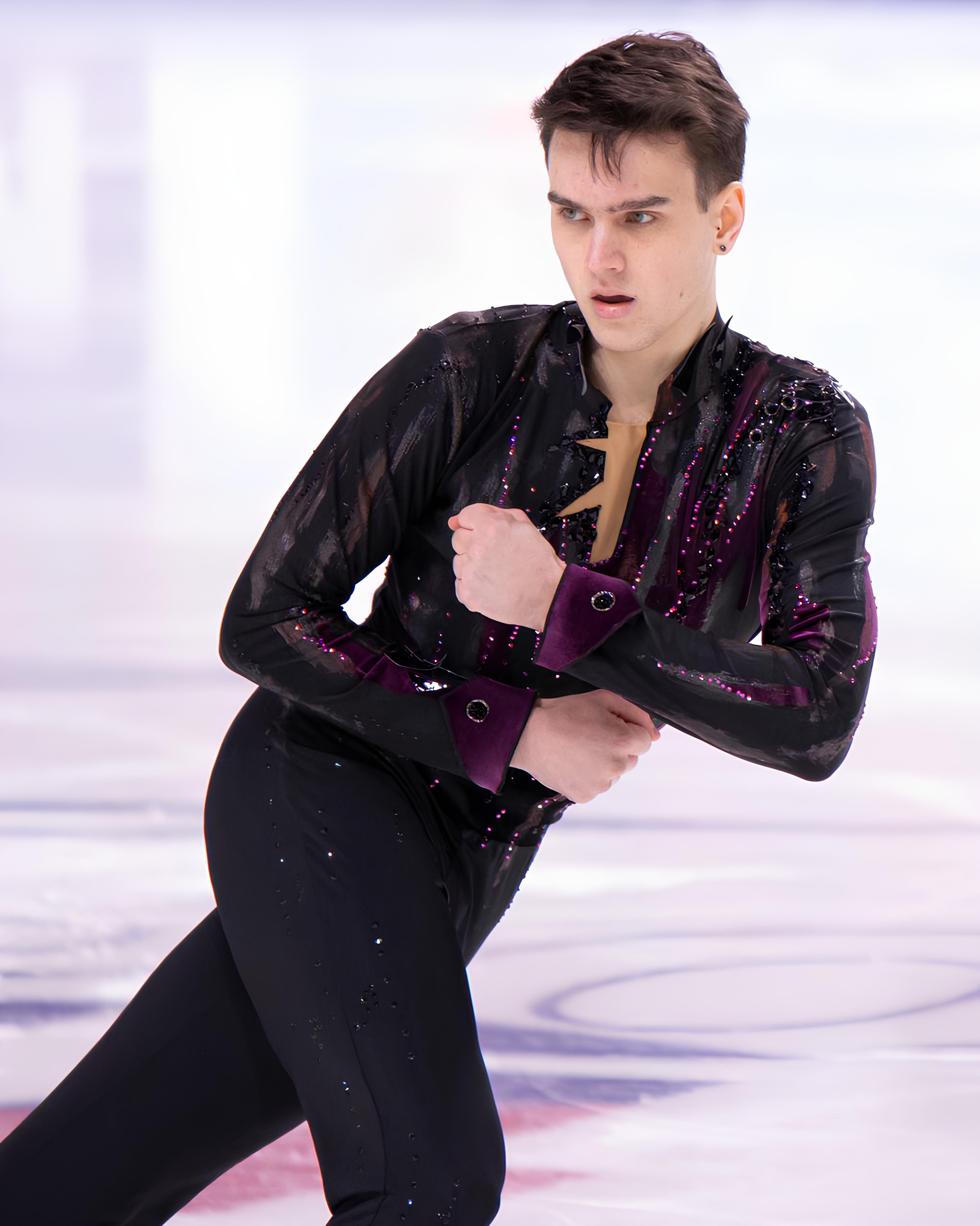
- Makar Ignatov at the 2024 Russian Championships

Personal information
- Native name: Макар Денисович Игнатов
- Full name: Makar Denisovich Ignatov
- Born: 21 June 2000 (age 26) Saint Petersburg, Russia
- Height: 1.83 m (6 ft 0 in)

Figure skating career
- Country: (Individual Neutral Athletes) Individual Neutral Athlete; Russia
- Discipline: Men's singles
- Coach: Eteri Tutberidze; Sergei Dudakov; Daniil Gleikhengauz
- Skating club: Eteri Tutberidze Figure Skating Centre
- Began skating: 2006

Medal record
Russian Championships
Silver medal – second place	2021 Chelyabinsk	Singles

Makar Denisovich Ignatov (Russian: Макар Денисович Игнатов, born 21 June 2000) is a Russian figure skater who currently competes as an Individual Neutral Athlete. He is the 2019 CS Nebelhorn Trophy champion, 2019 Rostelecom Cup bronze medalist, 2016 Cup of Nice bronze medalist and 2021 Russian national silver medalist.

In 2017, he won two medals on the ISU Junior Grand Prix series – silver in Latvia and bronze in Croatia. He is married to fellow figure skater Alexandra Trusova.

== Personal life ==
In September 2022, Ignatov received a summons to appear at the military commissariat for a potential call-up to serve in the Russian Army during the 2022 Russian mobilization.

In late 2023, Ignatov began dating fellow Russian figure skater Alexandra Trusova. On 17 June 2024, they formally announced their engagement on Instagram, and subsequently married on 17 August 2024.

On 22 March 2025, Ignatov and Trusova announced they were expecting their first child by sharing a video on Instagram. In April 2025, the couple revealed that they are expecting a son. A post shared on 8 August announced that their son, Mikhail, was born. A video later shared by Sasha confirmed Mikhail was born two days before the announcement and was born on 6 August.

== Career ==
=== Early years ===
Makar Ignatov began learning to skate in 2004. He missed two seasons due to knee problems and returned to competition in 2016. Making his international senior debut, he won bronze at the 2016 International Cup of Nice in mid-October. He finished fourth at the 2017 Russian Junior Championships after placing fifth in the short program and 3rd in the free skate.

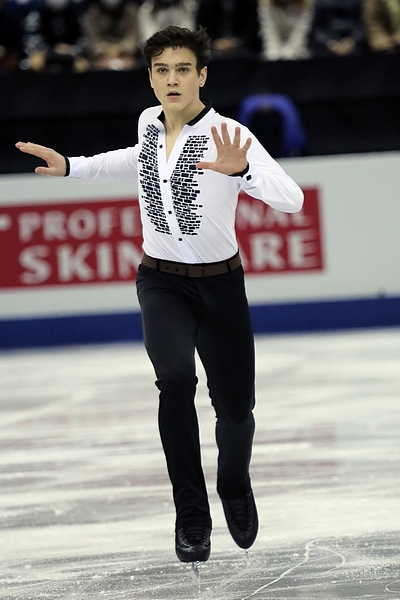
Ignatov at the 2017-2018 Junior Grand Prix Final

=== 2017–18 season ===
Ignatov's junior international debut came in early September 2017 at a 2017–18 ISU Junior Grand Prix (JGP) competition in Riga, Latvia; ranked second in both segments, he won the silver medal. He received the bronze medal at his second JGP assignment in Zagreb, Croatia. With these results, he qualified for the 2017–18 JGP Final in Nagoya, Japan, where he placed fourth.

In October 2017, Ignatov competed in his first ISU Challenger Series event, the 2017 CS Minsk-Arena Ice Star, where he placed fifth. A month later, he placed seventh at the 2017 CS Tallinn Trophy. At the 2018 Russian Championships, he placed twelfth on the senior level and sixth at the junior event.

=== 2018–19 season ===
In the summer of 2018, Ignatov broke a bone in his right foot while practicing a jump at a training camp. He returned to competition in late November, at the Tallinn Trophy. In February, Ignatov placed fourth at the Russian Cup Final with first technical element score in the free skate. In March, he won the St. Petersburg Cup Final with two clean performances, including two quads and triple Axels in each of the programs.

=== 2019–20 season ===
In late September, Ignatov won gold at the 2019 CS Nebelhorn Trophy after placing seventh in the short program and first in the free skate. He made his Grand Prix debut at the 2019 Rostelecom Cup, winning the bronze medal. At his second Grand Prix assignment, the 2019 NHK Trophy, he placed seventh.

At the 2020 Russian Championships, Ignatov won the short program, making only a slight error on his quad toe loop and receiving low marks on his spins. Fourth in the free skate after two step-outs and repeated spin level issues, he dropped to fourth place overall.

=== 2020–21 season ===
Ignatov debuted his programs at the Russian senior test skates, including the new quad loop. Competing on the domestic Cup of Russia series, he won bronze medals at the first stage in Syzran and the fourth stage in Kazan.

With the COVID-19 pandemic continuing to affect international travel, the ISU opted to run the Grand Prix based primarily on geographic location. Ignatov was assigned to the 2020 Rostelecom Cup, placing fourth in the short program and landing a clean quad loop but underrotating part of his jump combination. He landed three quads in the free skate, including another loop, but dropped to seventh place overall.

Competing at the 2021 Russian Championships, Ignatov placed second in the short program with a clean skate, four points behind leader Mikhail Kolyada. He struggled with some jump landings in the free skate, placing third in that segment behind Kolyada and Mark Kondratiuk, but remained in the silver medal position overall.

Following the national championships, Ignatov participated in the 2021 Channel One Trophy, a televised team event organized in lieu of the European Championships. He was selected for the Red Machine team captained by Alina Zagitova. He placed second in the short program and third in the free skate, and the Red Machine team claimed the trophy. Subsequently, he competed at the Russian Cup Final, which was widely assumed to be the deciding event for the second Russian men's berth at the 2021 World Championships in Stockholm. He placed eighth at the event.

Ignatov skating with his wife, Alexandra Ignatova at the 2026 Russian Challenge

=== 2021–22 season ===
Ignatov began the season on the Grand Prix at the 2021 Skate Canada International, where he finished fourth. He finished fourth as well at this second event, 2021 NHK Trophy.

At the 2022 Russian Championships, Ignatov finished in tenth place. In February, he participated in Russian Cup Final. He placed third in the short program but skated a strong free program and went to win first place.

=== 2026–27 season ===
On 30 June 2026, the International Skating Union announced that figure skaters from Russia and Belarus would be allowed to compete at international competitions as Individual Neutral Athletes (AINs). Each of these skaters are be required to undergo an individual assessment conducted by the ISU Council to determine whether they meet the criteria for neutral status. Ignatov's application was approved, making him eligible to compete internationally as a neutral athlete.

== Records and achievements ==
- The first Russian and also European skater to land four quadruple jumps in the free skate and also six quadruple jumps in two programs (at the 2021 NHK Trophy).

== Programs ==
Season	Short program	Free skating
2024–2025	Solo by Ultimo	Eternity by Machete
2023-2024	My Funny Valentine by Richard Rodgers and Lorenz Hart performed by Michael Bublé	Habanera (from Carmen) by Georges Bizet performed by Wall of Noise, Imagine Music, and Joseph William Morgan
2022–2023	So Far (from Broadchurch) by Ólafur Arnalds choreo. by Nikita Mikhaylov	Gatsby Believed in the Green Light (from The Great Gatsby) by Craig Armstrong; Boom Boom by John Lee Hooker performed by 2WEI; Avarice by Jonathon Deering choreo. by Nikita Mikhaylov
2021–2022	Iron Sky by Paolo Nutini choreo. by Olga Glinka and Valentin Molotov	Piano Concerto No. 1 by Pyotr Ilyich Tchaikovsky choreo. by Olga Glinka and Valentin Molotov
2020–2021	I Can't Go On Without You by Kaleo choreo. by Valentin Molotov	Je suis malade by Serge Lama performed by Francesco Di Cello choreo. by Valentin Molotov
2019–2020	In This Shirt by The Irrepressibles	Remember (from Troy) by James Horner performed by Josh Groban
2018–2019	Ghost the Musical by Bruce Joel Rubin, Dave Stewart, Glen Ballad; Unchained Melody	Remember (from Troy) by James Horner performed by Josh Groban
2017–2018	Per Te performed by Josh Groban	Piano Concerto in F sharp minor, Op. 20 by Alexander Scriabin

== Competitive highlights ==
GP: Grand Prix; CS: Challenger Series; JGP: Junior Grand Prix

International
Event	11–12	16–17	17–18	18–19	19–20	20–21	21–22	22–23	23–24	24–25	25–26
GP NHK Trophy					7th		4th				
GP Rostelecom Cup					3rd	7th					
GP Skate Canada							4th				
CS Golden Spin					3rd						
CS Ice Star			5th								
CS Nebelhorn					1st						
CS Tallinn Trophy			7th								
Cup of Nice		3rd	9th								
Denis Ten Memorial					2nd						
International: Junior
JGP Final			4th								
JGP Croatia			3rd								
JGP Latvia			2nd								
Tallinn Trophy				4th							
National
Russian Champ.			12th		4th	2nd	10th	7th	6th	6th	13th
Russian Jr. Champ.	10th	4th	6th								
Russian Cup Final (Note: The 2023 Russian Cup Final was renamed as the 2023 Russian Grand Prix Final.)		1st J		4th	1st	8th	1st	5th	9th		

== Detailed results ==
Small medals for short and free programs awarded only at ISU Championships.

=== Senior level ===
2021–22 season
Date	Event	SP	FS	Total
25–27 March 2022	2022 Channel One Trophy	4; 89.43	6; 137.32	1T/5P; 226.75
23–27 February 2022	2022 Russian Cup Final	3; 83.06	1; 176.79	1; 259.85
21–26 December 2021	2022 Russian Championships	3; 95.84	14; 154.93	10; 250.77
12–14 November 2021	2021 NHK Trophy	4; 90.54	4; 166.66	4; 257.20
29–31 October 2021	2021 Skate Canada International	4; 89.79	5; 154.38	4; 244.17
2020–21 season
Date	Event	SP	FS	Total
26 Feb. – 2 Mar. 2021	2021 Russian Cup Final	7; 84.66	7; 148.99	8; 233.65
5–7 February 2021	2021 Channel One Trophy	2; 99.81	3; 176.43	1T/3P; 276.24
23–27 December 2020	2021 Russian Championships	2; 98.30	3; 167.07	2; 265.37
20–22 November 2020	2020 Rostelecom Cup	4; 91.82	7; 168.96	7; 260.78
2019–20 season
Date	Event	SP	FS	Total
24–29 December 2019	2020 Russian Championships	1; 88.88	4; 160.58	4; 249.46
4–7 December 2019	2019 CS Golden Spin of Zagreb	8; 72.66	2; 156.56	3; 229.22
22–24 November 2019	2019 NHK Trophy	5; 78.47	8; 143.98	7; 222.45
15–17 October 2019	2019 Rostelecom Cup	3; 87.54	3; 165.33	3; 252.87
9–12 October 2019	2019 Denis Ten Memorial Challenge	4; 72.80	2; 142.19	2; 214.99
25–28 September 2019	2019 CS Nebelhorn Trophy	7; 65.28	1; 155.23	1; 220.51

=== Junior level ===
2018–19 season
Date	Event	Level	SP	FS	Total
26 Nov. – 2 Dec. 2018	2018 Tallinn Trophy	Junior	2; 64.69	5; 100.64	4; 165.33
2017–18 season
Date	Event	Level	SP	FS	Total
23–26 January 2018	2018 Russian Junior Championships	Junior	5; 74.79	8; 140.45	6; 215.24
21–24 December 2017	2018 Russian Championships	Senior	11; 75.81	10; 141.44	12; 217.25
7–10 December 2017	2017–18 Junior Grand Prix Final	Junior	4; 75.78	4; 136.21	4; 211.99
21–26 November 2017	2017 CS Tallinn Trophy	Senior	8; 65.40	7; 131.31	7; 196.71
26–29 October 2017	2017 CS Minsk-Arena Ice Star	Senior	7; 71.68	5; 144.65	5; 216.33
11–15 October 2017	2017 Cup of Nice	Senior	8; 69.95	9; 125.52	9; 195.47
27–30 September 2017	2017 JGP Croatia	Junior	4; 72.00	1; 147.22	3; 219.22
6–9 September 2017	2017 JGP Latvia	Junior	2; 64.95	2; 131.93	2; 196.88
2016–17 season
Date	Event	Level	SP	FS	Total
1–5 February 2017	2017 Russian Junior Championships	Junior	5; 77.55	3; 152.99	4; 230.54
22–24 September 2016	2016 Cup of Nice	Senior	3; 67.94	3; 131.45	3; 199.39
2011–12 season
5–7 February 2012	2012 Russian Junior Championships	Junior	10; 56.85	9; 113.08	10; 169.93
