= Niki Wories =

Dutch figure skater (born 1996)

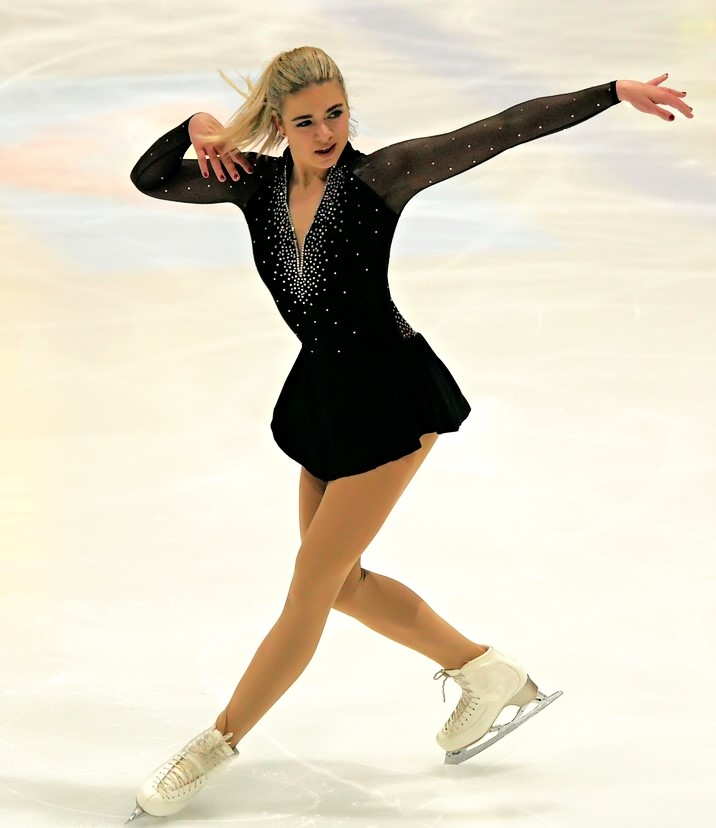
- Wories at the 2019 International Challenge Cup

Personal information
- Full name: Niki Angeneta Wories
- Born: 18 June 1996 (age 30) Almere, Netherlands
- Height: 1.67 m (5 ft 5 1/2 in)

Figure skating career
- Country: Netherlands
- Discipline: Women's singles
- Coach: Thomas Kennes
- Skating club: MSB, Breda, The Netherlands
- Began skating: 2001

Medal record
Dutch Championships
Gold medal – first place	2015 Den Bosch	Singles
Gold medal – first place	2016 The Hague	Singles
Gold medal – first place	2017 The Hague	Singles
Gold medal – first place	2018 The Hague	Singles
Gold medal – first place	2019 The Hague	Singles
Gold medal – first place	2020 The Hague	Singles
Gold medal – first place	2025 The Hague	Singles
Gold medal – first place	2026 The Hague	Singles
Silver medal – second place	2014 Amsterdam	Singles
Silver medal – second place	2022 Tilburg	Singles

Niki Angeneta Wories (born 18 June 1996) is a Dutch figure skater. An eight-time Dutch national champion (2015-20, 2025-26), she has won twelve senior international medals and qualified for the free skate at three ISU Championships.

== Personal life ==
Niki Wories was born on 18 June 1996 in Almere, Netherlands. She is the second daughter of Annelies and Paul Wories. She studied at the Johan Cruyff Academy before moving to Quebec, Canada. Following her initial retirement in 2022, Wories moved back to the Netherlands.

Her mother died in 2023.

== Career ==
=== Early career ===
Wories began skating in 2001 and her first coach was Astrid Tameling-Winkelman, who trained her in Dordrecht. Wories debuted internationally at the 2007 Merano Cup as a novice skater, where she finished nineteenth. She would go on to finish sixteenth at the 2009 International Challenge Cup the following season.

In March 2012, Wories debuted on the international junior level at the 2012 Coupe du Printemps, where she placed twenty-third. She subsequently finished eighteenth at the 2012 NRW Trophy.

=== 2013–14 season: Junior Grand Prix debut ===
Prior to the season, Wories switched coaches and began training under Sylvia Holtes and András Száraz in Dordrecht and Zoetermeer.

She debuted on the ISU Junior Grand Prix series in August 2013, finishing twenty-fourth at 2013 JGP Latvia. She subsequently went on to compete on the junior level at the 2013 NRW Trophy and the 2014 Bavarian Open, placing fifteenth and fourteenth, respectively.

In March 2014, it was announced that Wories had returned to former coach, Astrid Tameling-Winkelman.

Wories would then close the season with a ninth-place finish on the junior level at the 2014 International Challenge Cup.

=== 2014–2015 season: European and World Championship debut ===
Wories remained on the junior level in the first half of the 2014–15 season. Competing on the ISU Junior Grand Prix, she finished twenty-fourth at 2014 JGP Germany, before going on to finish sixth at the 2014 Open d'Andorra and ninth at the 2014 NRW Trophy.

In January 2015, she became the Dutch national senior champion. She then made her senior international debut at the 2015 European Championships in Stockholm, Sweden, but failed to advance to the free skate segment after placing thirty-first in the short program.

In February, Wories won senior bronze medals at the Bavarian Open and International Challenge Cup, where she also achieved the minimum technical score to compete at the senior World Championships. In March, she qualified for the free skate at the 2015 World Junior Championships in Tallinn, Estonia by placing fifteenth in the short program; she finished twenty-third overall. Later that month, she competed at the 2015 World Championships in Shanghai, China – the first Dutch competitor at Worlds since 2010. Ranked thirty-second in the short program, she did not make the cut for the free skate.

=== 2015–2016 season ===
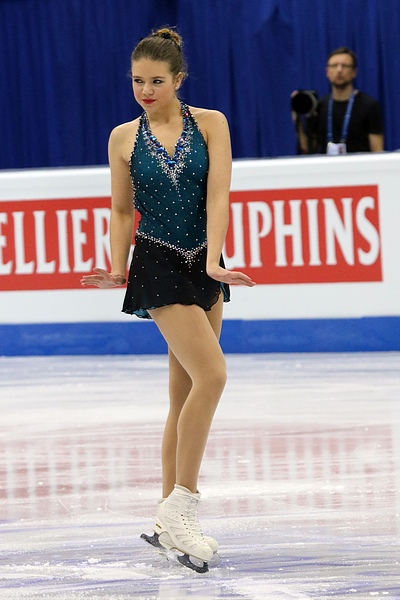
Wories at the 2016 European Championships

Wories started the season in September, finishing fifteenth at the 2015 CS Nebelhorn Trophy. In October, it was announced that she had changed coaches, relocating to Montreal, Canada to train under Bruno Marcotte. Wories subsequently competed at the 2015 NRW Trophy and the 2015 CS Golden Spin of Zagreb, finishing seventh and ninth, respectively.

At the 2016 European Championships in Bratislava, Slovakia, Wories advanced to the free skate segment and finished twentieth overall. She advanced to the free skate segment again at the 2016 World Championships in Boston, United States, where she placed twenty-second.

=== 2016–2017 season: Struggles with injuries ===
In December 2016, Wories underwent two operations due to bursitis in her foot. Having sustained a concussion that same month, she decided not to compete at the 2017 European Championships. According to a February 2017 report, she has sustained five concussions.

Wories' sole competition appearance was at the 2017 International Challenge Cup, where she finished eighteenth.

=== 2017–2018 season ===
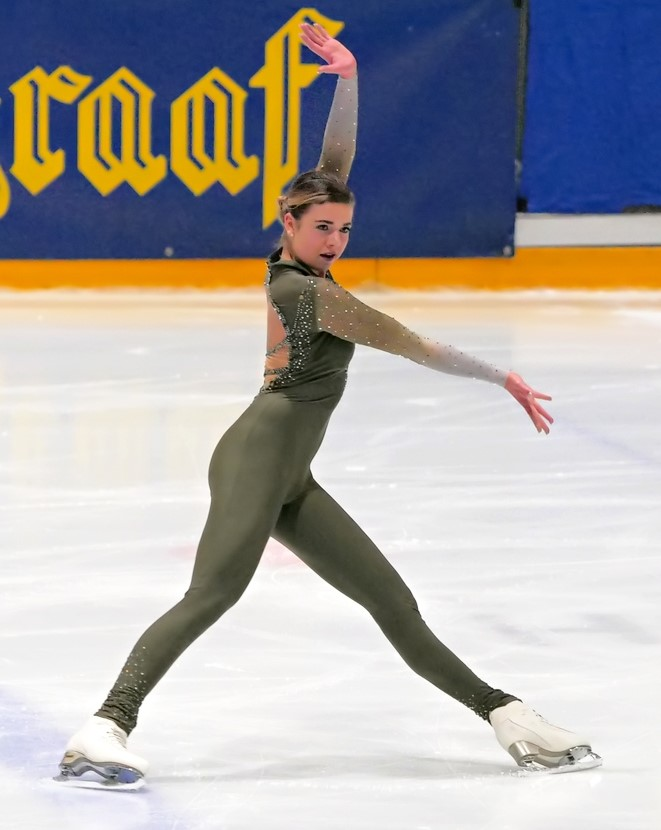
Wories at the 2018 Challenge Cup

Wories began the season by competing at the 2017 CS Nebelhorn Trophy, where she placed twenty-sixth. She would go on to win gold at the 2017 Bosphorus Cup and at the 2018 Mentor Toruń Cup. Between those two events, she placed eighth at the 2018 Bavarian Open. Wories would close the season with an eleventh-place finish at the 2018 International Challenge Cup.

Following the season, Wories' coach, Bruno Marcotte relocated to Oakville, Ontario. Electing to remain in Montreal, Nicholas Young and Ian Connolly became Wories' new coaches.

=== 2018–2019 ===
Wories started the season by placing fourteenth at the 2018 CS Autumn Classic International. She would subsequently go on to finish ninth at the 2018 Golden Bear of Zagreb, third at the 2018 Bosphorus Cup, and sixteenth at the 2018 CS Golden Spin of Zagreb.

In early 2019, Wories would place tenth at the 2019 Mentor Toruń Cup, twelfth at the 2019 Bavarian Open, and seventh at the 2019 International Challenge Cup.

=== 2019–2020 season ===
Wories began the season by competing on the 2019–20 ISU Challenger Series, placing thirteenth at the 2019 CS Autumn Classic International, seventeenth at the 2019 CS Finlandia Trophy, and twelfth at the 2019 CS Golden Spin of Zagreb. She would also placed twelfth at the 2019 Tallinn Trophy between the latter two events.

Selected to compete at the 2020 European Championships in Graz, Austria, Wories would place thirty-fifth in the short program, failing to advance to the free skate segment. She would then go on to win bronze at the 2020 Bavarian Open and place seventh at the 2020 International Challenge Cup.

Although Wories was scheduled to make her World Championship return post-injury in 2020 in Montreal, but these were cancelled as a result of the coronavirus pandemic.

=== 2020–2021 season ===
Wories' only competition was at the 2020 Ice Star, where she completed the short program but withdrew before the free skate.

=== 2021–2022 season: Retirement ===
Wories began the 2021-2022 season at the 2021 NRW Trophy, where she finished ninth. Going on to compete on the 2021–22 ISU Challenger Series, Wories finished sixteenth at the 2021 CS Warsaw Cup and twentieth at the 2021 CS Golden Spin of Zagreb. She would then close the season with a twelfth-place finish at the 2022 International Challenge Cup.

Wories' retirement from competition was announced on May 17, 2022. She was subsequently appointed the figure skating discipline manager for the Koninklijke Nederlandsche Schaatsenrijders Bond (Royal Dutch Ice Skaters Association).

=== 2024–2025 season: Return to competition ===
In August 2024, at the age of twenty-eight, Wories announced her plans of returning to competitive figure skating after two and a half years of not competing. Regarding her decision, Wories said, "Life is unpredictable and sometimes takes you to places you didn't know you would go to. I realize that the ice is a place where I feel good. And whether I achieve anything with it, sport-wise or not, I don't care. It gives me peace of mind." She also announced that she would be coached by Thomas Kennes in Breda. For her free program, Wories specifically selected music from the Gladiator soundtrack in tribute to her late mother since this music was played during her funeral the year prior.

She started the season by competing at the 2024 CS Budapest Trophy in early October, where she placed ninth, earning a personal best free skate and combined total scores. In an interview following the event, she stated that her main goal for the season was to compete at the European Championships. Two weeks later, Wories would deliver even stronger performances and score higher at the 2024 CS Nepela Memorial, where she finished in fourth place. She followed these results up by winning bronze at the 2024 Tirnavia Ice Cup, silver at the 2024 NRW Trophy, as well as another silver medal at the 2024 Santa Claus Cup. In early December, Wories would come in eighth place at the 2024 CS Golden Spin of Zagreb.

In early January, Wories finished eighth at the 2025 Bavarian Open. Later that month, she competed at the 2025 European Championships in Tallinn, Estonia. Wories placed twenty-sixth in the short program and did not advance to the free skate segment.

She subsequently finished sixth at the 2025 Challenge Cup and the 2025 Bellu Memorial, before closing the season with a bronze medal win at the 2025 Coupe du Printemps.

=== 2025–2026 season ===
During the summer off-season, Wories sustained a knee fracture and as a result, was unable to do any on-ice training for a couple months. Her first competition of the season was the ISU Skate to Milano, which she competed at only weeks after returning to training. She finished that event in twenty-third place. Two months later, Wories won the gold medal at the 2025 NRW Trophy. She then competed on the 2025–26 Challenger Series, finishing eleventh at the 2025 CS Warsaw Cup and fourteenth at the 2025 CS Golden Spin of Zagreb.

In January, Wories competed at the 2026 European Championships in Sheffield, England, United Kingdom, finishing in twenty-eighth place. One week later, she competed at the 2026 Challenge Cup, winning the gold medal.

In March 2026, Wories returned to the World Championships, her first time at the competition since 2016. At the 2026 World Championships, she finished twenty-eighth after the short program, unable to advance to the free skate.

== Programs ==
Season	Short program	Free skating
2025–26	My Heart Will Go On (from Titanic) by Celine Dion choreo. by Thomas Kennes	Gladiator; The Wheat; The Battle; Honor Him; Now We Are Free by Hans Zimmer & Lisa Gerrard choreo. by Thomas Kennes
2024–25	My Heart Will Go On (from Titanic) by Celine Dion choreo. by Thomas Kennes; Who I Am by Wyn Starks choreo. by Florent Amodio	Gladiator; The Wheat; The Battle; Honor Him; Now We Are Free by Hans Zimmer & Lisa Gerrard choreo. by Thomas Kennes
2021–22	Ode to a Sleeping City by Nikolai Clavier choreo. by Julie Marcotte	Les Misérables by Claude-Michel Schönberg choreo. by Julie Marcotte
2019–20	Lylatov by Alain Lefèvre choreo. by Julie Marcotte	Adiós Nonino by Astor Piazzolla performed by Ensemble Romulo Larrea & Veronica Larc choreo. by Julie Marcotte
2018–19	Lylatov by Alain Lefèvre choreo. by Julie Marcotte	It's a Man's Man's Man's World performed by Joss Stone choreo. by Julie Marcotte
2017–18	California Dreamin' by John Phillips & Michelle Phillips choreo. by Julie Marcotte	It's a Man's Man's Man's World performed by Joss Stone choreo. by Julie Marcotte
2016–17	California Dreamin' by John Phillips & Michelle Phillips choreo. by Julie Marcotte	Les Misérables by Claude-Michel Schönberg choreo. by Julie Marcotte
2015–16	The Lady Is a Tramp performed by Ginette Reno ft. Oliver Jones choreo. by Julie Marcotte	Les Misérables by Claude-Michel Schönberg choreo. by Julie Marcotte
2014–15	Sand by Nathan Lanier ft. Karen Whipple; Torn (from High Strung) choreo. by Susan Mason	Children of Dune by Bryan Tyler choreo. by Susan Mason
2013–14	Angels & Demons by Hans Zimmer choreo. by Sylvia Holtes, Katja Wories	Fantasy choreo. by Sylvia Holtes, Katja Wories

== Competitive highlights ==
- JGP – Event of the ISU Junior Grand Prix Series
- CS – Event of the ISU Challenger Series
- TBD – Assigned
- WD – Withdrew from competition

Competition placements at senior level
Season	2013–14	2014–15	2015–16	2016–17	2017–18	2018–19	2019–20	2020–21	2021–22	2024–25	2025–26
World Championships		32nd	22nd								28th
European Championships		31st	20th				35th			26th	28th
Dutch Championships	2nd	1st	1st	1st	1st	1st	1st		2nd	1st	1st
CS Autumn Classic						14th	13th				
CS Budapest Trophy										9th	
CS Finlandia Trophy							17th				
CS Golden Spin of Zagreb			9th			16th	12th		20th	8th	14th
CS Nebelhorn Trophy			15th		26th						
CS Nepela Memorial										4th	
CS Warsaw Cup									16th		11th
Bavarian Open		3rd			8th	12th	3rd				
Bellu Memorial										6th	
Bosphorus Cup					1st	3rd					
Challenge Cup		3rd		18th	11th	7th	7th		12th	6th	1st
Coupe du Printemps										3rd	
Golden Bear of Zagreb						9th					
Mentor Cup					1st	10th					
NRW Trophy			7th						9th	2nd	1st
Santa Claus Cup										2nd	
Skate to Milano											23rd
Sofia Trophy										7th	
Tallink Hotels Cup											6th
Tallinn Trophy							12th				
Tirnavia Ice Cup										3rd	
Winter Star								WD			

Competition placements at junior level
Season	2009–10	2011–12	2012–13	2013–14	2014–15
World Junior Championships					23rd
Dutch Championships	8th	4th	1st		
JGP Germany					24th
JGP Latvia				24th	
Bavarian Open				14th	
Challenge Cup				9th	
Coupe du Printemps		23rd			
NRW Trophy			18th	15th	9th
Open d'Andorra					6th

== Detailed results ==
ISU personal best scores in the +5/-5 GOE System
Segment	Type	Score	Event
Total	TSS	159.65	2024 CS Golden Spin of Zagreb
Short program	TSS	55.12	2019 CS Golden Spin of Zagreb
Short program	TES	31.92	2019 CS Golden Spin of Zagreb
Short program	PCS	25.56	2021 CS Golden Spin of Zagreb
Free skating	TSS	109.64	2024 CS Golden Spin of Zagreb
Free skating	TES	57.70	2024 CS Golden Spin of Zagreb
Free skating	PCS	52.96	2021 CS Warsaw Cup

=== Senior results ===
Results in the 2024-25 season
Date	Event	SP		FS		Total	
Date	Event	P	Score	P	Score	P	Score
Oct 11–13, 2024	(Hungary) 2024 CS Budapest Trophy	11	47.22	6	101.76	9	148.98
Oct 24–26, 2024	(Slovakia) 2024 CS Nepela Memorial	6	53.33	4	104.71	4	158.04
Nov 1–3, 2024	(Slovakia) 2024 Tirnavia Ice Cup	5	46.43	2	103.49	3	149.92
Nov 12–17, 2024	(Germany) 2024 NRW Trophy	3	51.83	2	108.02	2	159.85
Nov 27 – Dec 2, 2024	(Hungary) 2024 Santa Claus Cup	3	56.43	1	110.69	2	167.12
Dec 5–7, 2024	(Croatia) 2024 CS Golden Spin of Zagreb	10	50.01	7	109.64	8	159.65
Jan 7-12, 2025	(Bulgaria) 2025 Sofia Trophy	7	53.72	7	105.87	7	159.59
Jan 28 – Feb 2, 2025	(Estonia) 2025 European Championships	26	42.26	—N/a	—N/a	26	42.26
Feb 13–16, 2025	(Netherlands) 2025 Challenge Cup	6	54.21	6	106.99	6	161.20
Feb 18–23, 2025	(Romania) Bellu Memorial	4	55.52	7	103.03	6	158.55
Mar 14–16, 2025	(Luxembourg) Coupe du Printemps	1	55.44	3	94.80	3	150.27

Results in the 2025–26 season
Date	Event	SP		FS		Total	
Date	Event	P	Score	P	Score	P	Score
Sep 18–21, 2025	(China) 2025 ISU Skate to Milano	22	39.50	23	66.84	23	106.34
Nov 13–16, 2025	(Germany) 2025 NRW Trophy	1	52.82	1	101.11	1	153.93
Nov 19–23, 2025	(Poland) 2025 CS Warsaw Cup	12	47.88	7	100.37	11	148.25
Dec 3–6, 2025	(Croatia) 2025 CS Golden Spin of Zagreb	16	49.86	15	92.2	14	142.68
Jan 13–18, 2026	(United Kingdom) 2026 European Championships	28	48.14	—N/a	—N/a	28	48.14
Jan 22–25, 2026	(Netherlands) 2026 Challenge Cup	1	52.00	1	100.35	1	152.35
Feb 19-22, 2026	(Estonia) 2026 Tallink Hotels Cup	8	52.26	6	104.11	6	156.37
Mar 24–29, 2026	(Czech Republic) 2026 World Championships	28	48.41	—N/a	—N/a	28	48.41
