= Jon Lane =

British ice dancing coach and former competitor

Personal information
- Full name: Jon Philip Lane
- Born: August 17, 1949 (age 76)

Figure skating career
- Country: United Kingdom
- Partner: Janet Sawbridge
Medal record
Representing Great Britain
Figure skating: Ice dancing
World Championships
| Bronze medal – third place | 1968 Geneva | Ice dancing |
European Championships
| Silver medal – second place | 1969 Garmisch- Partenkirchen | Ice dancing |
| Bronze medal – third place | 1968 Västerås | Ice dancing |

Jon Philip Lane (born 17 August 1949) is a British ice dancing coach and former competitor. With Janet Sawbridge, he is the 1968 World bronze medalist and a two-time European medalist (silver in 1969, bronze in 1968).

Lane emigrated to Canada with his wife, Carol and son, Jon Lane, a Creative Director in Toronto. They coach ice dancing together in Scarborough, Toronto, Ontario. Their past and present students include:

- Mackenzie Bent / Garrett MacKeen
- Vanessa Crone / Paul Poirier
- Piper Gilles / Paul Poirier
- Kharis Ralph / Asher Hill
- Olivia Nicole Martins / Alvin Chau
- Carolane Soucisse / Shane Firus

== Competitive highlights ==
With Janet Sawbridge

International
| Event | 1966 | 1967 | 1968 | 1969 | 1970 | 1971 |
|---|---|---|---|---|---|---|
| World Championships | 6th | 4th | 3rd | 4th | 7th | 6th |
| European Championships | 6th | 4th | 3rd | 2nd | | |
National
| British Championships | 3rd | 3rd | 3rd | 2nd | | |
