= Shane Firus =

Canadian-Irish ice dancer (born 1994)

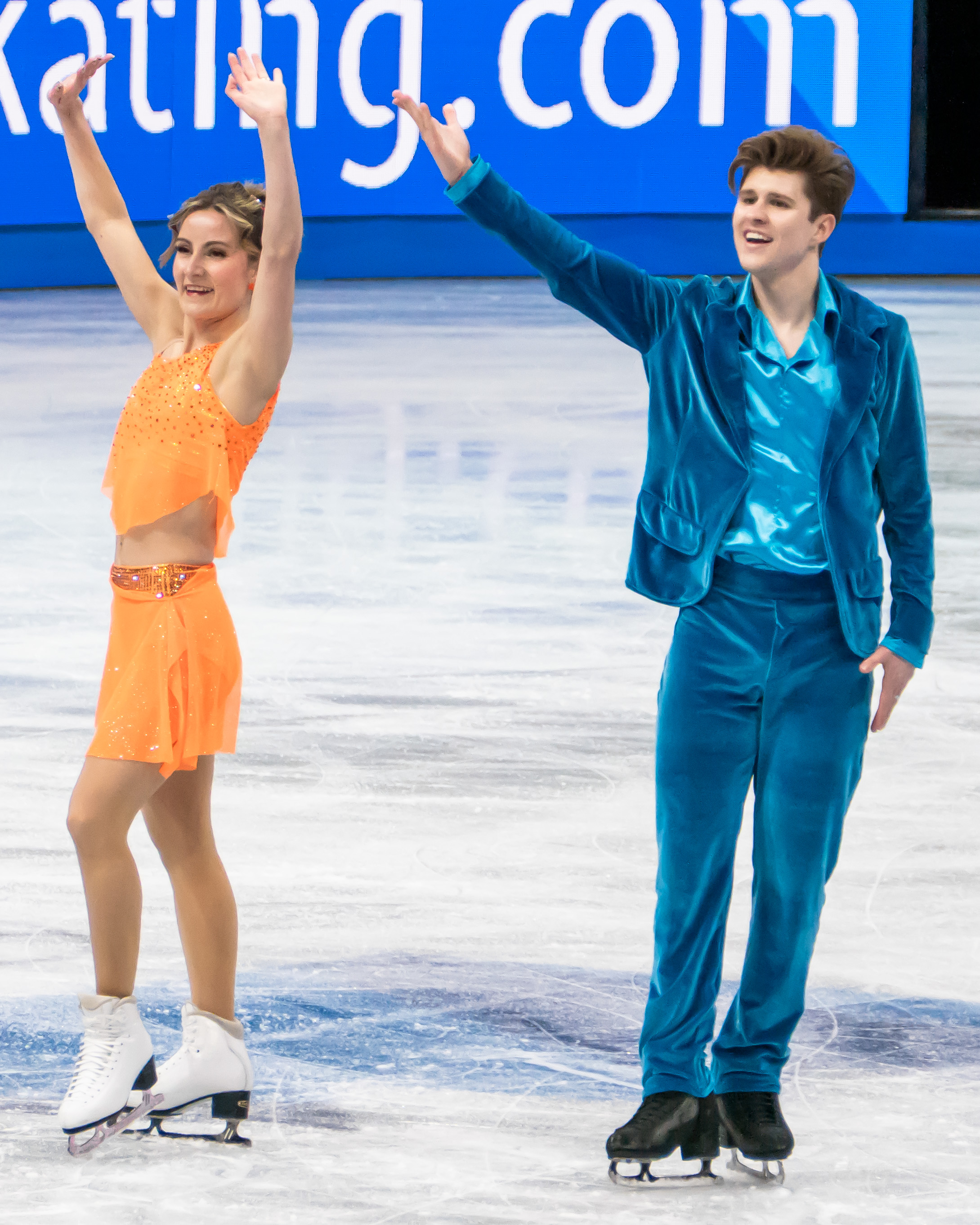
- Carolane Soucisse and Shane Firus at the 2025 World Championships

Personal information
- Born: February 21, 1994 (age 32) North Vancouver, British Columbia, Canada
- Height: 1.69 m (5 ft 6 1/2 in)

Figure skating career
- Country: Ireland (since 2023); Canada (2011–23)
- Discipline: Ice dance
- Partner: Carolane Soucisse (2016–26); Lauren Collins (2014–16); Caelen Dalmer (2011–13)
- Coach: Carol Lane; Jon Lane; Juris Razgulajevs; Marc-André Servant
- Skating club: County Wexford
- Began skating: 2003

Medal record
Representing Ireland
Irish Championships
| Gold medal – first place | 2023 Dundee | Ice dance |
| Gold medal – first place | 2024 Dundee | Ice dance |
| Gold medal – first place | 2025 Dundee | Ice dance |
Representing Canada
Four Continents Championships
| Silver medal – second place | 2018 Taipei | Ice dance |
Canadian Championships
| Bronze medal – third place | 2020 Mississauga | Ice dance |

Shane Firus (born February 21, 1994) is Canadian retired ice dancer who represented both Ireland and Canada. With skating partner and wife, Carolane Soucisse, he is a three-time Irish national champion (2023–25). Skating with Soucisse for Canada, he is the 2018 Four Continents silver medallist. They have finished fourth at the 2017 and 2018 Canadian Championships and represented Canada on the Grand Prix circuit and at the World Championships and Ireland at the European and World Championships.

Firus previously competed with Caelen Dalmer and Lauren Collins in the junior and senior ranks.

== Personal life ==
Shane Firus was born on February 21, 1994, in Vancouver, British Columbia, Canada. He studied business and marketing at Georgian University. He is the brother of Canadian single skater Liam Firus. He married his ice dancer partner, Carolane Soucisse, on May 2, 2024.

== Career ==
=== Early career ===
Firus began learning to skate in 2001. He teamed up with Caelen Dalmer in May 2008. Dalmer/Firus were coached by Rod Mackie and Shae Zukiwsky before joining Megan Wing and Aaron Lowe in Burnaby, British Columbia. They competed at two ISU Junior Grand Prix events (in 2011 and 2012) and won the junior bronze medal at the 2013 Canadian Championships. Their partnership ended in 2013.

Firus and Lauren Collins had their first tryout together in February 2014 and agreed to form a partnership in May. They decided to train at the Mariposa School of Skating in Barrie, Ontario, coached by David Islam, Kelly Johnson and James Callan. Collins/Firus finished sixth at a Junior Grand Prix event in Japan and won the junior silver medal at the 2015 Canadian Championships. After moving up to the senior level, they placed fifth at the 2015 CS Nebelhorn Trophy and tenth at the 2016 Canadian Championships.

=== 2016–2017 season: Debut of Soucisse/Firus ===
Firus teamed up with Carolane Soucisse in 2016. They decided to train in Montréal under the guidance of Marie-France Dubreuil and Patrice Lauzon. The two placed seventh at the 2017 CS Autumn Classic International and had the same result at the International Cup of Nice. They finished fourth at the 2017 Canadian Championships.

=== 2017–2018 season: Four Continents silver ===
Soucisse/Firus participated in two ISU Challenger Series events, placing fifth at the 2017 CS U.S. International Figure Skating Classic and fourth at the 2017 CS Finlandia Trophy. They then made their Grand Prix debut at the 2017 Skate Canada International, where they placed seventh.

In January, they placed third in the short dance, fourth in the free dance, and fourth overall at the 2018 Canadian Championships. As the fourth-place finisher, they were assigned to the 2018 Four Continents Championships, their first ISU Championship event. They placed third in the short and second in the free, winning the silver medal. Firus said the two were "ecstatic" at the result, having achieved their goal of a medal.

Following the 2018 Winter Olympics, Tessa Virtue and Scott Moir withdrew from Canada's delegation to the 2018 World Championships in Milan. Soucisse/Firus, as the first alternates, took their places, making their World Championship debut. They placed eleventh in the short dance, fourteenth in the free dance, and fourteenth overall.

=== 2018–2019 season: Challenger Series bronze ===
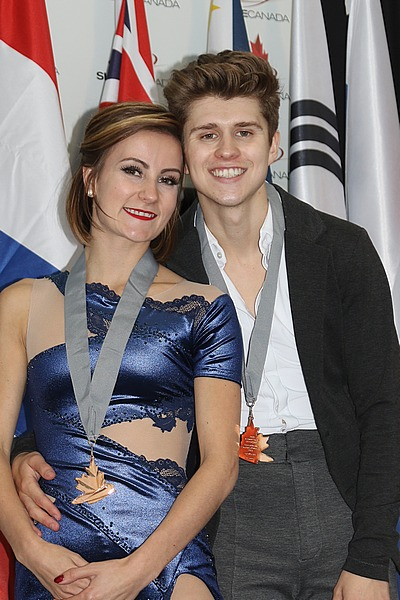
Soucisse/Firus during the medal ceremony at the 2018 CS Autumn Classic International

Soucisse/Firus began their season at the 2018 CS Autumn Classic International, where they won the bronze medal after placing third in the rhythm dance and fourth in the free dance. Firus remarked that he felt they had left a few technical points on the table but was otherwise satisfied with their performance. At their second Challenger event, the 2018 CS Finlandia Trophy, they finished fourth overall, having placed third in the rhythm dance and fifth in the free skate following an error from Soucisse on the one-foot step sequence in the latter.

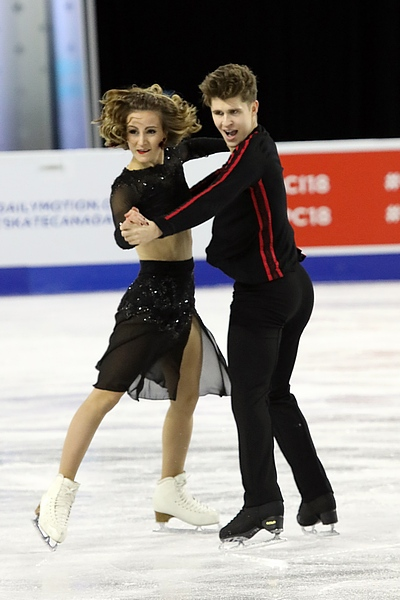
Soucisse/Firus at 2018 Skate Canada International

The duo had two Grand Prix events for the season, beginning with the 2018 Skate Canada International, where a fall on the midline step left them in ninth place after the rhythm dance. They subsequently placed seventh in the free dance and eighth overall. At their second event, 2018 NHK Trophy, they placed fifth in both segments and fifth overall, setting a new personal best in the free dance.

Following the Grand Prix, the two opted to return to their previous season's free dance, as the Weeknd medley they had been using had not received the scores they would have wanted. They placed fourth in the rhythm dance at the 2019 Canadian Championships. The free dance proved difficult, with Soucisse struggling on her twizzles and falling toward the end of the program. They were sixth in the free dance and dropped to fifth overall.

=== 2019–2020 season: Canadian national bronze ===
Soucisse/Firus were assigned to two Challenger events to begin the season, placing fifth at the 2019 CS Autumn Classic International before winning the bronze medal at the 2019 CS U.S. Classic.

On the Grand Prix, they were seventh to begin at the 2019 Internationaux de France. Soucisse/Firus placed eighth at the 2019 NHK Trophy.

With training mates and presumptive silver medalists Fournier Beaudry/Sørensen sitting out the 2020 Canadian Championships, Soucisse/Firus competed with Lajoie/Lagha for the silver medal. Both teams made errors in the rhythm dance, with Soucisse putting her free foot down to regain balance at one point in the Finnstep pattern dance, and Soucisse/Firus placed third in that segment. Early in the free dance, Firus fell on the one-foot step sequence, and they finished third in that segment as well, winning the bronze medal. They were assigned to compete at the 2020 Four Continents Championships in Seoul. They placed seventh at Four Continents, with Firus falling again in the free dance.

Following the results of Four Continents, Soucisse/Firus were named as alternates for the Canadian team to the 2020 World Championships and subsequently were added to the team after Fournier Beaudry/Sørensen were judged unable to compete. Shortly afterward, the World Championships were cancelled due to the COVID-19 pandemic, which they later called "a big low" for them. On April 16, 2020, Soucisse/Firus announced that they would be moving to train at the Scarboro Figure Skating Club under Carol and Jon Lane and Juris Razgulajevs.

=== 2020–2021 season ===
Soucisse/Firus were assigned to the 2020 Skate Canada International, but this event was also cancelled due to the pandemic. Due to a minor training injury, they were unable to participate in filming for the virtual 2021 Skate Canada Challenge and were granted a bye to the 2021 Canadian Championships. However, the championships were subsequently cancelled.

Soucisse/Firus were named as alternates to the 2021 World Championships. With Canada's mandatory two-week quarantine for returning athletes, however, no member of the World team was assigned to the 2021 World Team Trophy, and Soucisse/Firus were assigned as Canada's entry in the dance segment. They placed sixth in both of their segments of the competition, and Team Canada finished in sixth place.

=== 2021–2022 season ===
Soucisse/Firus made their season debut at the 2021 CS Autumn Classic International, where they placed fifth. They were eleventh at the 2021 CS Finlandia Trophy after a rhythm dance error left them in fourteenth place after that segment. Soucisse said, "there's some work to do on the rhythm dance, but the programs are taking form and trending in the right direction."

On the Grand Prix, Soucisse/Firus placed seventh at the 2021 Skate America. They were initially assigned to the 2021 Cup of China as their second Grand Prix, but following its cancellation they were reassigned to the 2021 Gran Premio d'Italia. They placed seventh there as well, with Firus saying they were happy with their free dance performance.

Competing at the 2022 Canadian Championships, Soucisse/Firus finished in fourth place. They were fourth as well at the 2022 Four Continents Championships.

=== 2022–2023 season: Last season representing Canada & switch to Ireland ===
Beginning the season at the 2022 CS Nebelhorn Trophy, Soucisse/Firus won the bronze medal, their first international medal since 2019. They finished eighth at the 2022 Skate America, their first Grand Prix assignment. Soucisse/Firus then came sixth at the 2022 Grand Prix of Espoo. They finished fourth at the 2023 Canadian Championships.

Soucisse/Firus skated at the 2023 Irish National Figure Skating Championships and became the first ice dancers to win the senior title in the history of the event.

=== 2023–2024 season: International debut for Ireland ===
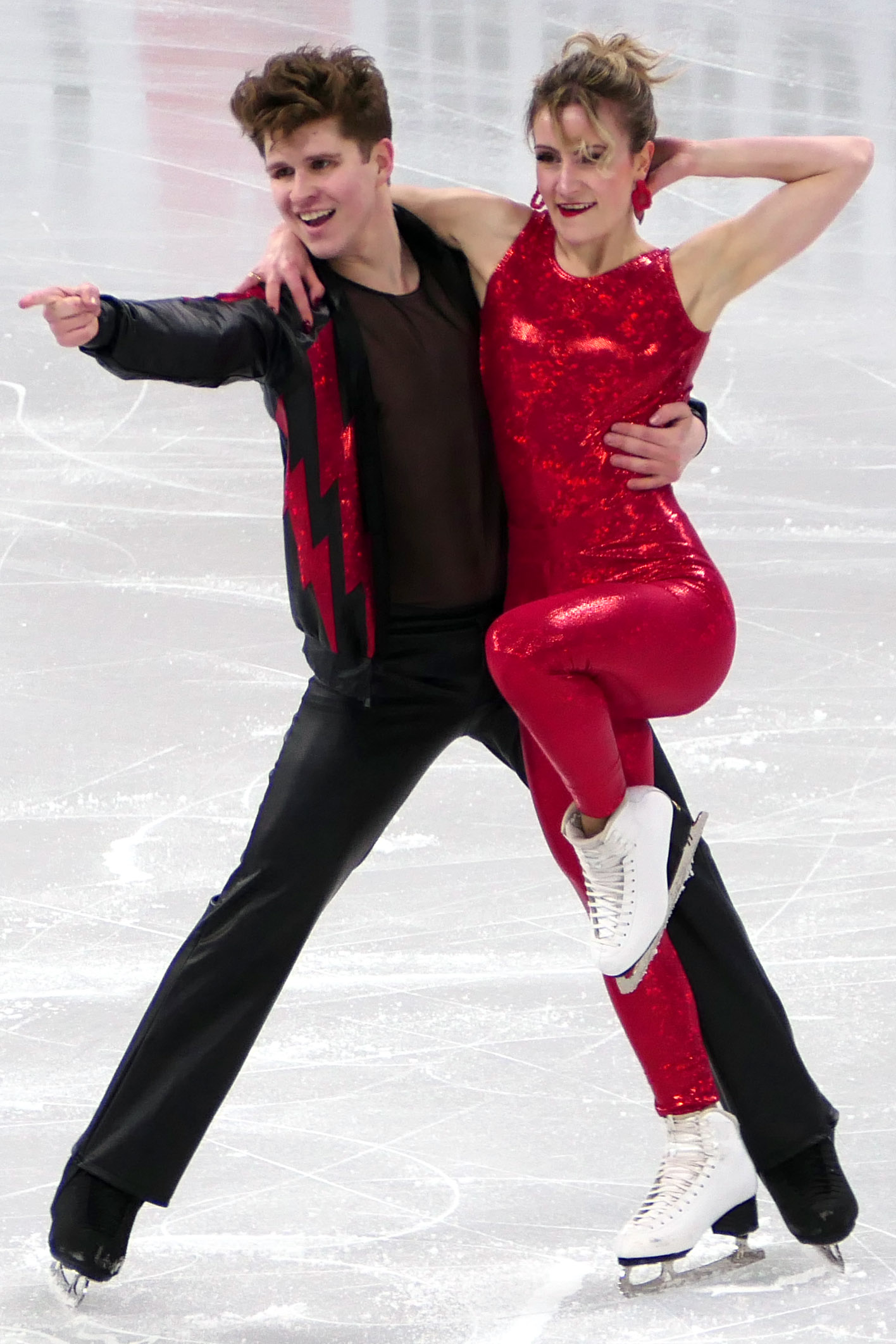
Soucisse/Firus during practice at the 2024 World Championships

Following their release from Skate Canada, Soucisse/Firus made their international debut for Ireland at the 2023 Bosphorus Cup where they came eighth. They finished twelfth at the 2023 CS Golden Spin of Zagreb. They became the first ice dancers to represent Ireland at an ISU Championship at the 2024 European Championships at which they placed thirteenth. They won a bronze medal at the 2024 Egna Trophy, the first international ice dance medal for Ireland. At the 2024 World Championships, they finished in twentieth place.

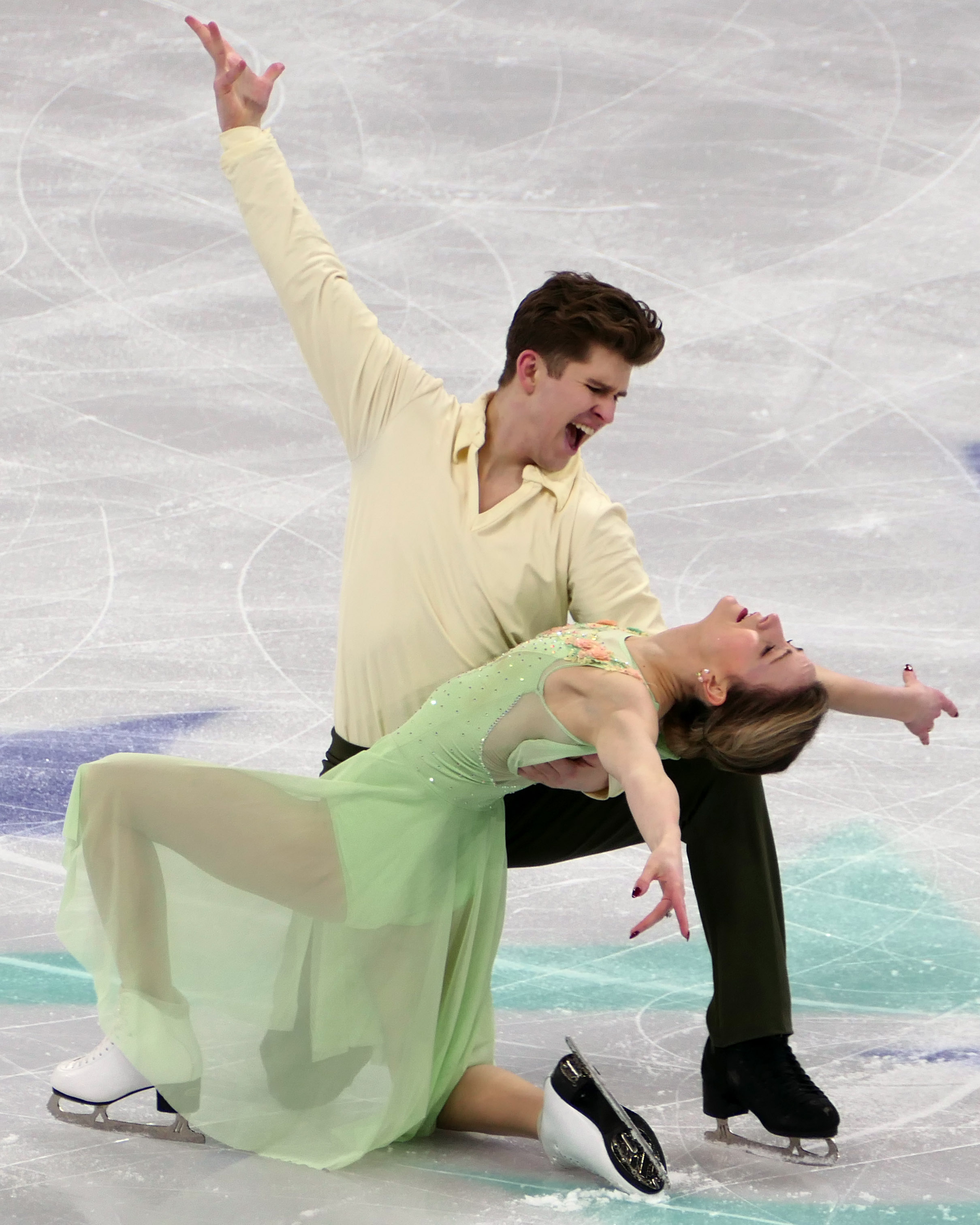
Soucisse and Firus performing their free dance at the 2024 World Championships

=== 2024–2025 season ===
Soucisse/Firus began their season with a fifth-place finish at the 2024 CS Lombardia Trophy. Going on to compete at the 2024 Trophée Métropole Nice Côte d'Azur, the team placed ninth in the rhythm dance but were forced to withdraw before the free dance due to Soucisse suffering from a chest infection. They would then go on to finish fourth at the 2024 Denkova-Staviski Cup and win bronze at the 2024 EduSport Trophy.

In January, Soucisse/Firus finished eighteenth at the 2025 European Championships in Tallinn, Estonia. They subsequently finished the season by placing twenty-eighth at the 2025 World Championships in Boston, Massachusetts, United States.

=== 2025–26 season: Final competitive season ===
Soucisse/Firus opened their season with a silver medal win at the 2025 International Ice Dance Dordrecht. They then went on to finish ninth at the ISU Skate to Milano before competing on the 2025–26 Challenger Series, placing tenth at the 2025 CS Warsaw Cup and eighth at the 2025 CS Tallinn Trophy.

In January, Soucisse/Firus finished nineteenth at the 2026 European Championships in Sheffield, England, United Kingdom.

On March 14, 2026, Firus announced his and Soucisse's retirement from competitive ice dance.

== Programs ==
=== Ice dance with Carolane Soucisse ===
| Season | Rhythm dance | Free dance | Exhibition |
|---|---|---|---|
| 2025–2026 | Step by Step; Call It What You Want; Step by Step (The C&C Vocal Club Mix) by New Kids on the Block choreo. by Carol Lane, Juris Razgulajevs, Alexandra Crenian | Riverdance; Reel Around the Sun; Home and the Heartland; Reel Around the Sun by Bill Whelan choreo. by Carol Lane, Juris Razgulajevs, Alexandra Crenian | |
| 2024–2025 | I Got the Feelin' by James Brown; Anti Love Song by Betty Davis; Get Up Offa That Thing by James Brown choreo. by Carol Lane, Juris Razgulajevs, Alexandra Crenian, Kaitlyn Weaver | It Had to Be You; Cry Me a River; It Had to Be You by Harry Connick Jr. choreo. by Carol Lane, Juris Razgulajevs, Alexandra Crenian, Kaitlyn Weaver | |
| 2023–2024 | Ghetto Life by Rick James; Fire and Desire by Rick James & Teena Marie; Super Freak by Rick James choreo. by Carol Lane, Juris Razgulajevs | Hier encore; La Bohème by Charles Aznavour choreo. by Carol Lane, Juris Razgulajevs | |
| 2022–2023 | Samba: Perdiendo el Control by De la Ghetto x Marco Acevedo; Rhumba: Quererte Bonito by Elena Rose & Sebastián Yatra; Samba: Perdiendo el Control by De la Ghetto x Marco Acevedo choreo. by Carol Lane, Juris Razgulajevs | Aloha Ke Akua; Creation’s Daughter; Aloha Ke Akua by Nahko and Medicine for the People choreo. by Carol Lane, Juris Razgulajevs | Simply the Best by Noah Reid |
| 2021–2022 | Blues: What's Love Got to Do with It by Tina Turner; Enough Is Enough by Barbra Streisand & Donna Summer choreo. by Carol Lane, Juris Razgulajevs | Hier encore; La Bohème by Charles Aznavour choreo. by Carol Lane, Juris Razgulajevs | |
| 2020–2021 | Swing: December, 1963 (Oh, What a Night) by The Four Seasons; Foxtrot: Can't Take My Eyes Off You by Frankie Valli (from Jersey Boys) choreo. by Marie-France Dubreuil, Romain Haguenauer | It's Not Unusual; Without Love; She's a Lady by Tom Jones choreo. by Marie-France Dubreuil, Romain Haguenauer, Carol Lane, Juris Razgulajevs | |
| 2019–2020 | Swing: December, 1963 (Oh, What a Night) by The Four Seasons; Foxtrot: Can't Take My Eyes Off You by Frankie Valli (from Jersey Boys) choreo. by Marie-France Dubreuil, Romain Haguenauer | It's Not Unusual; Without Love; Sex Bomb by Tom Jones choreo. by Marie-France Dubreuil, Romain Haguenauer | |
| 2018–2019 | Tango: "Felino"; Tango - Hip Hop: "Tango" by Electrotutango | I Won't Dance by Oscar Hammerstein II; Cheek to Cheek by Irving Berlin; I Won't Dance by Oscar Hammerstein II all performed by Tony Bennett, Lady Gaga; "Earned It" by The Weeknd; "Dirty Diana" by Michael Jackson performed by The Weeknd | |
| | Short dance | | |
| 2017–2018 | Samba: "Bailando"; Rhumba: "El Perdedor"; Samba: "Let Me Be Your Lover" by Enrique Iglesias | I Won't Dance by Oscar Hammerstein II; Cheek to Cheek by Irving Berlin; I Won't Dance by Oscar Hammerstein II all performed by Tony Bennett, Lady Gaga | |
| 2016–2017 | "Minnie the Moocher"; Soda Pop by Robbie Williams | "Impossible Love" by Melody Gardot; "Desde de Alma" composed by Osvaldo Pugliese; "Taquito Militar" by Ensemble Romulo Larrea, Veronica Larc | |

=== With Collins ===
| Season | Short dance | Free dance |
|---|---|---|
| 2015–2016 | Waltz: Second Waltz by Dmitri Shostakovich; March: Radetzky March by Johann Strauss I choreo. by Romain Haguenauer | Beautiful Tango by Hindi Zahra; Song of No Regrets; Breakfast in Baghdad by Na Yoon-sun choreo. by Shae Zukiwsky |
| 2014–2015 | Rhumba: Historia de un Amor performed by Nana Mouskouri; Samba: Mujer Latina by Thalía | La Foule by Ángel Cabral; La Vie en rose by Louis Guglielmi; Milord by Georges Moustaki |

=== With Dalmer ===
| Season | Short dance | Free dance |
|---|---|---|
| 2012–2013 | Swing: I Got a Woman by Ray Charles; Blues: Don't Cry Baby by Etta James; Swing: I Got a Woman by Ray Charles | Cats by Andrew Lloyd Webber; Macavity; Mungojerrie and Rumpleteazer; Prologue: Jellicle Songs for Jellicle Cats |
| 2011–2012 | Cha Cha: Hey Daddy by Della Reese; Mambo: Chihuahua by Louis Oliveira and his Bandodalua Boys | An American in Paris by George Gershwin; 'S Wonderful performed by Gene Kelly, Georges Guétary; I Got Rhythm performed by Gene Kelly |

== Competitive highlights ==
- GP – Event of the ISU Grand Prix Series
- JGP – Event of the ISU Junior Grand Prix Series
- CS – Event of the ISU Challenger Series
- TBD – Assigned
- WD – Withdrew from competition

=== Ice dance with Carolane Soucisse (for Ireland) ===
Competition placements at senior level
| Season | 2022–23 | 2023–24 | 2024–25 | 2025–26 |
|---|---|---|---|---|
| World Championships | | 20th | 28th | |
| European Championships | | 13th | 18th | 19th |
| Irish Championships | 1st | 1st | | |
| CS Golden Spin of Zagreb | | 12th | | |
| CS Lombardia Trophy | | | 5th | |
| CS Tallinn Trophy | | | 7th | 8th |
| CS Warsaw Cup | | | | 10th |
| Bosphorus Cup | | 8th | | |
| Denkova-Staviski Cup | | | 4th | |
| EduSport Trophy | | | 3rd | |
| Egna Spring Trophy | | 3rd | | |
| ICE Dance Dordrecht | | | | 2nd |
| Skate to Milano | | | | 9th |

=== Ice dance with Carolane Soucisse (for Canada) ===
Competition placements at senior level
| Season | 2016–17 | 2017–18 | 2018–19 | 2019–20 | 2020–21 | 2021–22 | 2022–23 |
|---|---|---|---|---|---|---|---|
| World Championships | | 14th | | | | | |
| Four Continents Championships | | 2nd | | 7th | | 4th | |
| Canadian Championships | 4th | 4th | 5th | 3rd | | 4th | 4th |
| World Team Trophy | | | | | 6th (6th) | | |
| GP Finland | | | | | | | 6th |
| GP France | | | | 7th | | | |
| GP Italy | | | | | | 7th | |
| GP NHK Trophy | | | 5th | 8th | | | |
| GP Skate America | | | | | | 7th | 8th |
| GP Skate Canada | | 7th | 8th | | | | |
| CS Autumn Classic | 7th | | 3rd | 5th | | 5th | |
| CS Finlandia Trophy | | 4th | 4th | | | 11th | |
| CS Nebelhorn Trophy | | | | | | | 3rd |
| CS U.S. Classic | | 5th | | 3rd | | | |
| Cup of Nice | 7th | | | | | | |
| Lake Placid Ice Dance | | | | 4th | | | |

=== With Collins for Canada ===
International
| Event | 14–15 | 15–16 |
|---|---|---|
| CS Nebelhorn Trophy | | 5th |
| JGP Japan | 6th | |
National
| Canadian Championships | 2nd J | 10th |

=== With Dalmer for Canada ===
International
| Event | 11–12 | 12–13 |
|---|---|---|
| JGP Italy | 9th | |
| JGP Slovenia | | 6th |
National
| Canadian Championships | 7th J | 3rd J |

== Detailed results ==
=== Ice dance with Carolane Soucisse ===
ISU personal best scores in the +5/-5 GOE System
| Segment | Type | Score | Event |
|---|---|---|---|
| Total | TSS | 181.39 | 2019 CS U.S. International Classic |
| Rhythm dance | TSS | 73.32 | 2020 Four Continents Championships |
| Rhythm dance | TES | 41.55 | 2022 CS Nebelhorn Trophy |
| Rhythm dance | PCS | 31.80 | 2020 Four Continents Championships |
| Free dance | TSS | 110.06 | 2019 CS U.S. International Classic |
| Free dance | TES | 62.82 | 2019 CS U.S. International Classic |
| Free dance | PCS | 48.24 | 2019 CS U.S. International Classic |

ISU personal best scores in the +3/-3 GOE System
| Segment | Type | Score | Event |
|---|---|---|---|
| Total | TSS | 164.96 | 2018 Four Continents Championships |
| Rhythm dance | TSS | 65.11 | 2018 Four Continents Championships |
| Rhythm dance | TES | 34.85 | 2018 World Championships |
| Rhythm dance | PCS | 30.28 | 2018 Four Continents Championships |
| Free dance | TSS | 99.85 | 2018 Four Continents Championships |
| Free dance | TES | 54.58 | 2018 Four Continents Championships |
| Free dance | PCS | 47.36 | 2018 World Championships |

- Small medals for the short program and free skating are only awarded at ISU Championships.

==== For Ireland ====
Results in the 2022–23 season
| Date | Event | RD | | FD | | Total | |
| Date | Event | P | Score | P | Score | P | Score |
|---|---|---|---|---|---|---|---|
| Jun 17–18, 2023 | (Republic of Ireland) 2023 Irish Championships | 1 | 63.84 | 1 | 96.66 | 1 | 160.50 |

Results in the 2023–24 season
| Date | Event | RD | | FD | | Total | |
| Date | Event | P | Score | P | Score | P | Score |
|---|---|---|---|---|---|---|---|
| Nov 27 – Dec 3, 2023 | (Turkey) 2023 Bosphorus Cup | 14 | 56.41 | 7 | 101.77 | 8 | 158.18 |
| Dec 6–9, 2023 | (Croatia) 2023 CS Golden Spin of Zagreb | 15 | 54.04 | 11 | 90.41 | 12 | 144.45 |
| Jan 8–14, 2024 | (Lithuania) 2024 European Championships | 12 | 66.69 | 13 | 101.50 | 13 | 168.19 |
| Feb 8–11, 2024 | (Italy) Egna Dance Trophy | 2 | 68.45 | 4 | 99.70 | 3 | 168.15 |
| Mar 18–24, 2024 | (Canada) 2024 World Championships | 19 | 68.04 | 18 | 103.63 | 20 | 171.67 |
| Jun 8–9, 2024 | (Republic of Ireland) 2024 Irish Championships | 1 | 69.74 | 1 | 100.33 | 1 | 170.07 |

Results in the 2024–25 season
| Date | Event | RD | | FD | | Total | |
| Date | Event | P | Score | P | Score | P | Score |
|---|---|---|---|---|---|---|---|
| Sep 12–15, 2024 | (Italy) 2024 CS Lombardia Trophy | 4 | 69.52 | 6 | 101.82 | 5 | 171.34 |
| Nov 5-10, 2024 | (Bulgaria) 2024 Denkova-Staviski Cup | 7 | 60.10 | 3 | 104.02 | 4 | 164.12 |
| Nov 12–17, 2024 | (Estonia) 2024 CS Tallinn Trophy | 9 | 66.26 | 7 | 102.27 | 7 | 168.53 |
| Jan 28 – Feb 2, 2025 | (Estonia) 2025 European Championships | 19 | 61.56 | 17 | 100.20 | 18 | 161.76 |
| Mar 25–30, 2024 | (United States) 2025 World Championships | 28 | 58.68 | —N/a | —N/a | 28 | 58.68 |

Results in the 2025–26 season
| Date | Event | RD | | FD | | Total | |
| Date | Event | P | Score | P | Score | P | Score |
|---|---|---|---|---|---|---|---|
| Aug 16–17, 2025 | (Netherlands) 2025 International ICE Dance Dordrecht | 2 | 65.27 | 3 | 94.81 | 2 | 160.08 |
| Sep 18–21, 2025 | (China) 2025 ISU Skate to Milano | 8 | 64.53 | 11 | 93.89 | 9 | 158.42 |
| Nov 19–23, 2025 | (Poland) 2025 CS Warsaw Cup | 8 | 68.46 | 11 | 103.45 | 10 | 171.91 |
| Nov 25–30, 2025 | (Estonia) 2025 CS Tallinn Trophy | 8 | 64.56 | 8 | 102.99 | 8 | 167.55 |
| Jan 13–18, 2026 | (United Kingdom) 2026 European Championships | 18 | 62.71 | 19 | 88.28 | 19 | 150.99 |

==== For Canada ====
2022–23 season
| Date | Event | RD | FD | Total |
| January 9–15, 2023 | 2023 Canadian Championships | 4; 72.74 | 5; 108.26 | 4; 181.00 |
| November 25–27, 2022 | 2022 Grand Prix of Espoo | 6; 72.38 | 7; 103.25 | 6; 175.63 |
| October 21–23, 2022 | 2022 Skate America | 9; 64.09 | 7; 99.56 | 8; 163.65 |
| September 21–24, 2022 | 2022 CS Nebelhorn Trophy | 3; 73.23 | 3; 103.12 | 3; 176.35 |
2021–22 season
| Date | Event | RD | FD | Total |
| January 18–23, 2022 | 2022 Four Continents Championships | 4; 69.15 | 4; 103.30 | 4; 172.45 |
| January 6–12, 2022 | 2022 Canadian Championships | 4; 72.55 | 5; 109.99 | 4; 182.54 |
| November 5–7, 2021 | 2021 Gran Premio d'Italia | 8; 63.40 | 7; 100.46 | 7; 163.86 |
| October 22–24, 2021 | 2021 Skate America | 8; 63.08 | 7; 98.94 | 7; 162.02 |
| October 7–10, 2021 | 2021 CS Finlandia Trophy | 14; 60.23 | 10; 102.72 | 11; 162.95 |
| September 16–18, 2021 | 2021 CS Autumn Classic International | 5; 65.11 | 5; 101.50 | 5; 166.61 |
2020–21 season
| Date | Event | RD | FD | Total |
| April 15–18, 2021 | 2021 World Team Trophy | 6; 65.06 | 6; 97.86 | 6T/6P; 162.92 |
2019–20 season
| Date | Event | RD | FD | Total |
| February 4–9, 2020 | 2020 Four Continents Championships | 6; 73.32 | 7; 101.09 | 7; 174.41 |
| January 13–19, 2020 | 2020 Canadian Championships | 3; 75.83 | 3; 114.46 | 3; 190.29 |
| November 22–24, 2019 | 2019 NHK Trophy | 9; 68.39 | 8; 103.62 | 8; 172.01 |
| November 1–3, 2019 | 2019 Internationaux de France | 7; 68.61 | 7; 107.19 | 7; 175.80 |
| September 17–22, 2019 | 2019 CS U.S. International Classic | 3; 71.33 | 3; 110.06 | 3; 181.39 |
| September 12–14, 2019 | 2019 CS Autumn Classic International | 2; 72.70 | 5; 100.20 | 5; 172.90 |
2018–19 season
| Date | Event | RD | FD | Total |
| January 13–20, 2019 | 2019 Canadian Championships | 4; 73.36 | 6; 90.12 | 5; 163.48 |
| November 9–11, 2018 | 2018 NHK Trophy | 5; 66.01 | 5; 103.83 | 5; 169.84 |
| October 26–28, 2018 | 2018 Skate Canada International | 9; 57.10 | 7; 99.64 | 8; 156.74 |
| October 4–8, 2018 | 2018 CS Finlandia Trophy | 3; 70.79 | 5; 101.48 | 4; 172.27 |
| September 20–22, 2018 | 2018 CS Autumn Classic International | 3; 65.38 | 4; 100.86 | 3; 166.24 |
2017–18 season
| Date | Event | SD | FD | Total |
| March 19–25, 2018 | 2018 World Championships | 11; 64.02 | 14; 95.44 | 14; 159.46 |
| January 22–28, 2018 | 2018 Four Continents Championships | 3; 65.11 | 2; 99.85 | 2; 164.96 |
| January 8–14, 2018 | 2018 Canadian Championships | 3; 70.97 | 4; 109.76 | 4; 180.73 |
| October 27–29, 2017 | 2017 Skate Canada International | 7; 57.77 | 6; 92.50 | 7; 150.27 |
| October 6–8, 2017 | 2017 CS Finlandia Trophy | 4; 60.50 | 4; 94.10 | 4; 154.60 |
| September 13–17, 2017 | 2017 CS U.S. International Classic | 5; 52.16 | 5; 85.27 | 5; 137.43 |
2016–17 season
| Date | Event | SD | FD | Total |
| January 16–22, 2017 | 2017 Canadian Championships | 4; 62.50 | 4; 96.77 | 4; 159.27 |
| October 19–23, 2016 | 2016 International Cup of Nice | 6; 54.90 | 9; 75.74 | 7; 130.64 |
| Sept. 28 – Oct. 1, 2016 | 2016 CS Autumn Classic International | 7; 48.78 | 7; 80.00 | 7; 128.78 |
