= 2017 CS Finlandia Trophy =

Figure skating competition

2017 Finlandia Trophy
- Type: ISU Challenger Series
- Date: October 6 – 8
- Season: 2017–18
- Location: Espoo
- Venue: Espoo Metro Areena

Champions
- Men's singles: (China) Jin Boyang
- Ladies' singles: (Russia) Maria Sotskova
- Pairs: (China) Peng Cheng / Jin Yang
- Ice dance: (France) Gabriella Papadakis / Guillaume Cizeron
- Previous: 2016 CS Finlandia Trophy
- Next: 2018 CS Finlandia Trophy

The 2017 CS Finlandia Trophy was a senior international figure skating competition held in October 2017 in Espoo. It was part of the 2017–18 ISU Challenger Series. Medals were awarded in the disciplines of men's singles, ladies' singles, pair skating, and ice dance.

== Entries ==
The International Skating Union published the full preliminary list of entries on 5 September 2017.

Country	Men	Ladies	Pairs	Ice dance
Australia		Brooklee Han; Amelia Scarlett Jackson		
Austria		Natalie Klotz; Marika Steward		
Belarus	Anton Karpuk			
Canada	Kevin Reynolds; Roman Sadovsky	Gabrielle Daleman	Liubov Ilyushechkina / Dylan Moscovitch	Carolane Soucisse / Shane Firus
China	Jin Boyang; Li Tangxu	Zhao Ziquan	Peng Cheng / Jin Yang	Wang Shiyue / Liu Xinyu
Czech Republic	Michal Březina			Nicole Kuzmichová / Alexandr Sinicyn
Denmark				Laurence Fournier Beaudry / Nikolaj Sørensen
Estonia	Samuel Koppel; Daniel Albert Naurits	Jelizaveta Leonova; Annely Vahi		Katerina Bunina / German Frolov
Finland	Bela Papp; Valtter Virtanen	Viveca Lindfors; Emmi Peltonen		Cecilia Törn / Jussiville Partanen; Juulia Turkkila / Matthias Versluis
France				Lorenza Alessandrini / Pierre Souquet; Gabriella Papadakis / Guillaume Cizeron
Germany	Paul Fentz		Minerva Fabienne Hase / Nolan Seegert	Kavita Lorenz / Joti Polizoakis; Jennifer Urban / Benjamin Steffan
Italy		Carolina Kostner	Nicole Della Monica / Matteo Guarise	Anna Cappellini / Luca Lanotte
Japan		Yuna Shiraiwa		
Kazakhstan		Aiza Mambekova		
Latvia		Angelīna Kučvaļska		
Mongolia		Maral-Erdene Gansukh		
Philippines		Alisson Perticheto		
Poland				Natalia Kaliszek / Maksym Spodyriev
South Korea		Choi Da-bin; Choi Yu-jin; Yoon Seoyoung		
Russia	Mikhail Kolyada; Andrei Lazukin; Alexander Petrov	Alena Leonova; Maria Sotskova; Elizaveta Tuktamysheva	Kristina Astakhova / Alexei Rogonov; Ksenia Stolbova / Fedor Klimov	Betina Popova / Sergey Mozgov; Alexandra Stepanova / Ivan Bukin
Spain				Sara Hurtado / Kirill Khaliavin; Celia Robledo / Luis Fenero
Sweden		Matilda Algotsson; Joshi Helgesson; Isabelle Olsson		
Switzerland	Nicola Todeschini	Tina Leuenberger		
Turkey				Alisa Agafonova / Alper Uçar
Ukraine				Yuliia Zhata / Yan Lukouski
United Kingdom		Danielle Harrison; Anna Litvinenko; Karly Robertson		Lilah Fear / Lewis Gibson
United States	Ross Miner; Adam Rippon; Vincent Zhou	Polina Edmunds; Angela Wang	Jessica Calalang / Zack Sidhu; Deanna Stellato / Nathan Bartholomay	Julia Biechler / Damian Dodge; Lorraine McNamara / Quinn Carpenter

== Results ==
=== Men ===
Rank	Name	Nation	Total points	SP		FS	
1	Jin Boyang	China	252.60	2	87.15	3	165.45
2	Vincent Zhou	United States	250.01	6	76.10	1	173.91
3	Adam Rippon	United States	249.88	3	83.69	2	166.19
4	Mikhail Kolyada	Russia	248.50	1	90.45	5	158.05
5	Ross Miner	United States	233.72	7	71.64	4	162.08
6	Michal Březina	Czech Republic	233.28	5	77.26	6	156.02
7	Paul Fentz	Germany	212.16	4	77.64	10	134.52
8	Andrei Lazukin	Russia	210.66	8	68.50	7	142.16
9	Alexander Petrov	Russia	198.57	11	59.42	8	139.15
10	Roman Sadovsky	Canada	194.17	12	59.19	9	134.98
11	Kevin Reynolds	Canada	186.36	10	60.03	11	126.33
12	Valtter Virtanen	Finland	175.95	13	58.28	12	117.67
13	Li Tangxu	China	173.60	9	60.77	13	112.83
14	Samuel Koppel	Estonia	152.83	14	49.10	14	103.73
15	Anton Karpuk	Belarus	148.32	16	47.94	15	100.38
16	Bela Papp	Finland	148.19	15	48.26	16	99.93
17	Nicola Todeschini	Switzerland	141.90	17	45.87	17	96.03
18	Daniel Albert Naurits	Estonia	137.52	18	45.54	18	91.98

=== Ladies ===
Rank	Name	Nation	Total points	SP		FS	
1	Maria Sotskova	Russia	205.30	2	67.69	1	137.61
2	Carolina Kostner	Italy	193.76	3	67.45	2	126.31
3	Elizaveta Tuktamysheva	Russia	189.13	1	67.82	4	121.31
4	Angela Wang	United States	183.85	4	62.54	5	121.31
5	Alena Leonova	Russia	178.46	6	56.73	3	121.73
6	Gabrielle Daleman	Canada	174.83	5	60.72	7	114.11
7	Yuna Shiraiwa	Japan	172.25	8	52.98	6	119.27
8	Brooklee Han	Australia	161.11	7	55.40	10	105.71
9	Choi Da-bin	South Korea	158.53	10	52.06	9	106.47
10	Choi Yu-jin	South Korea	156.65	12	49.78	8	106.87
11	Emmi Peltonen	Finland	152.23	13	49.62	11	102.61
12	Karly Robertson	United Kingdom	144.68	9	52.21	14	92.47
13	Polina Edmunds	United States	142.20	14	49.62	13	92.58
14	Annely Vahi	Estonia	137.05	19	41.83	12	95.22
15	Anna Litvinenko	United Kingdom	136.60	16	45.67	15	90.93
16	Zhao Ziquan	China	133.77	11	51.11	19	82.66
17	Alisson Perticheto	Philippines	128.92	17	45.57	17	83.35
18	Natalie Klotz	Austria	124.64	20	39.45	16	85.19
19	Danielle Harrison	United Kingdom	116.18	22	36.21	20	79.97
20	Amelia Scarlett Jackson	Australia	115.82	21	36.78	21	79.04
21	Marika Steward	Austria	112.33	26	29.06	18	83.27
22	Yoon Seoyoung	South Korea	98.15	23	36.19	22	61.96
23	Tina Leueberger	Switzerland	95.14	24	34.52	23	60.62
24	Jelizaveta Leonova	Estonia	85.61	25	30.52	24	55.09
25	Maral-Erdene Gansukh	Mongolia	65.38	27	20.76	25	44.62
WD	Joshi Helgesson	Sweden	N/A	15	45.73	N/A	N/A
WD	Viveca Lindfors	Finland	N/A	18	43.12	N/A	N/A

=== Pairs ===
Rank	Name	Nation	Total points	SP		FS	
1	Peng Cheng / Jin Yang	China	198.03	1	70.93	2	127.10
2	Nicole Della Monica / Matteo Guarise	Italy	193.50	3	65.42	1	128.08
3	Ksenia Stolbova / Fedor Klimov	Russia	184.78	2	70.12	4	114.66
4	Liubov Ilyushechkina / Dylan Moscovitch	Canada	183.80	4	64.15	3	119.65
5	Kristina Astakhova / Alexei Rogonov	Russia	176.88	5	64.13	5	112.75
6	Deanna Stellato / Nathan Bartholomay	United States	161.17	7	50.90	6	110.27
7	Jessica Calalang / Zack Sidhu	United States	156.88	6	53.41	7	103.47
8	Minerva Fabienne Hase / Nolan Seegert	Germany	135.38	8	45.67	8	89.71

=== Ice dance ===
Rank	Name	Nation	Total points	SD		FD	
1	Gabriella Papadakis / Guillaume Cizeron	France	188.25	1	78.09	1	110.16
2	Alexandra Stepanova / Ivan Bukin	Russia	166.88	2	70.27	2	96.61
3	Laurence Fournier Beaudry / Nikolaj Sørensen	Denmark	158.21	3	65.76	5	92.45
4	Carolane Soucisse / Shane Firus	Canada	154.60	4	60.50	4	94.10
5	Betina Popova / Sergey Mozgov	Russia	152.28	7	57.36	3	94.92
6	Sara Hurtado / Kirill Khaliavin	Spain	144.66	8	56.44	7	88.22
7	Wang Shiyue / Liu Xinyu	China	143.05	5	58.50	8	84.55
8	Lorraine McNamara / Quinn Carpenter	United States	141.78	6	57.77	9	84.01
9	Lilah Fear / Lewis Gibson	United Kingdom	139.61	12	50.83	6	88.78
10	Natalia Kaliszek / Maksym Spodyriev	Poland	137.76	9	55.60	10	82.16
11	Cecilia Törn / Jussiville Partanen	Finland	134.10	10	53.23	12	80.87
12	Celia Robledo / Luis Fenero	Spain	133.01	11	50.90	11	82.11
13	Jennifer Urban / Benjamin Steffan	Germany	128.59	14	49.32	13	79.27
14	Nicole Kuzmichová / Alexandr Sinicyn	Czech Republic	128.44	13	49.59	14	78.85
15	Juulia Turkkila / Matthias Versluis	Finland	121.66	16	46.00	16	75.66
16	Lorenza Alessandrini / Pierre Souquet	France	120.34	15	47.04	17	73.30
17	Julia Biechler / Damian Dodge	United States	119.79	18	41.89	15	77.90
18	Yuliia Zhata / Yan Lukouski	Ukraine	109.72	17	42.65	18	67.07
19	Katerina Bunina / German Frolov	Estonia	80.30	19	32.00	19	48.30

=== Synchronized skating ===
Rank	Name	Nation	Total (SP)
1	Rockettes	Finland	69.60
2	Paradise	Russia	67.58
3	Marigold IceUnity	Finland	67.56
4	Team Unique	Finland	62.55
5	Lumineers	Finland	50.65
6	Team Boomerang	Sweden	41.90
