= Carolane Soucisse =

Canadian-Irish ice dancer (born 1995)

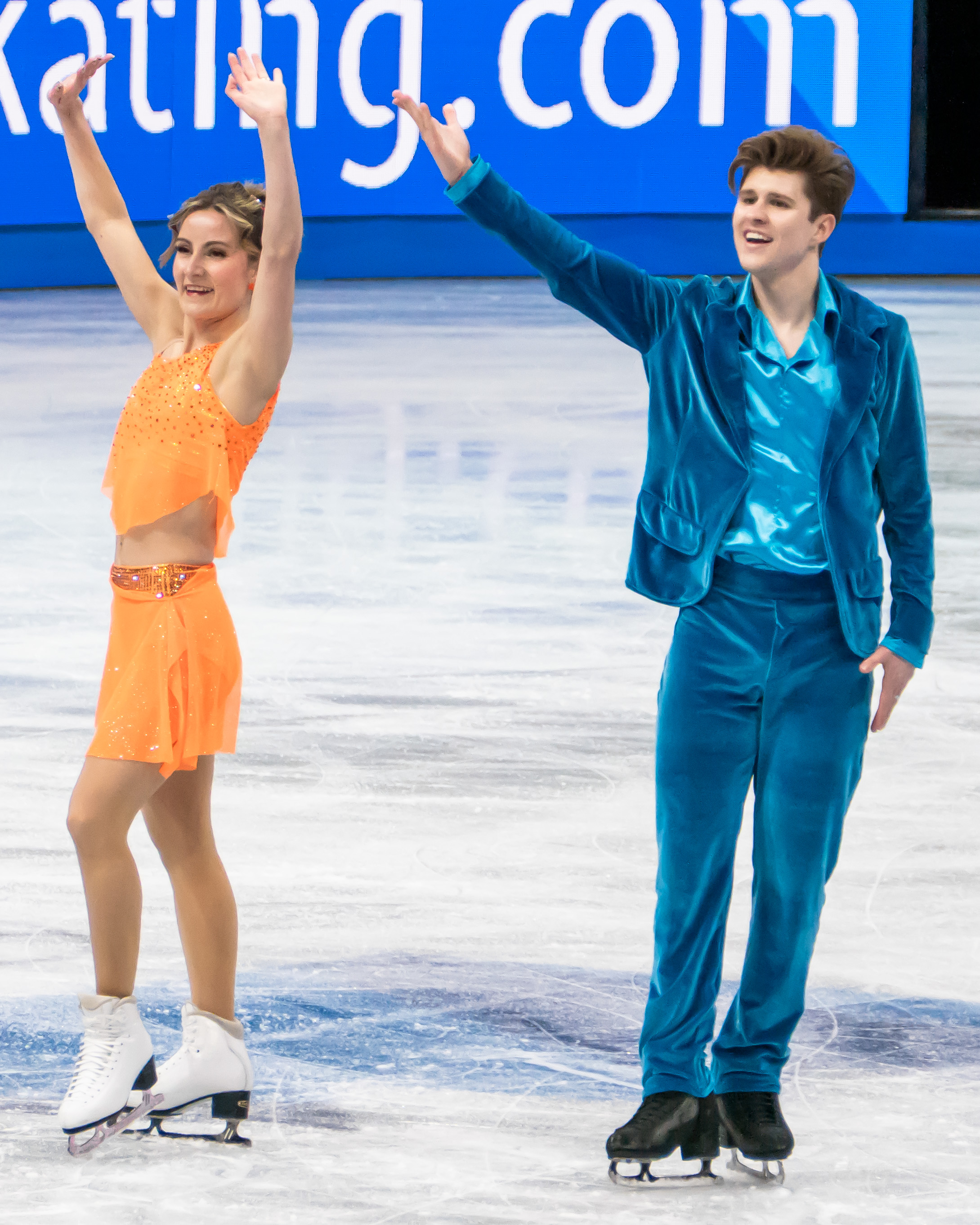
- Carolane Soucisse and Shane Firus at the 2025 World Championships

Personal information
- Born: February 10, 1995 (age 31) Châteauguay, Québec, Canada
- Home town: Montreal, Quebec
- Height: 1.55 m (5 ft 1 in)

Figure skating career
- Country: Ireland (since 2023); Canada (2010–23)
- Discipline: Ice dance
- Partner: Shane Firus (2016–26); Simon Tanguay (2012–16); Benjamin Smyth (2010–12); Alexandre Laliberté (2009–10)
- Coach: Carol Lane; Jon Lane; Juris Razgulajevs; Marc-André Servant
- Skating club: County Wexford
- Began skating: 2000
- Retired: March 14, 2026

Medal record
Representing Ireland
Irish Championships
Gold medal – first place	2023 Dundee	Ice dance
Gold medal – first place	2024 Dundee	Ice dance
Gold medal – first place	2025 Dundee	Ice dance
Representing Canada
Four Continents Championships
Silver medal – second place	2018 Taipei	Ice dance
Canadian Championships
Bronze medal – third place	2020 Mississauga	Ice dance

Carolane Soucisse (born February 10, 1995) is a Canadian retired ice dancer who represented both Ireland and Canada. With skating partner and husband, Shane Firus, she is a three-time Irish national champion (2023–25) and represented Ireland at the European and World Championships. Skating with Firus for Canada, she is the 2018 Four Continents silver medallist. They have finished third at the 2020 Canadian Championships and represented Canada on the Grand Prix circuit and at the World Championships.

She previously competed with Alexandre Laliberté and Benjamin Smyth in the novice and junior ranks and Simon Tanguay in the junior and senior ranks.

== Personal life ==
Carolane Soucisse was born on February 10, 1995, in Châteauguay, Québec, Canada. Her mother is Nathalie Guay. She married her ice dance partner, Shane Firus, on May 2, 2024.

== Career ==
=== 2000 to 2012 ===
Soucisse began learning to skate in 2000. With Alexandre Laliberté, she became the pre-novice bronze medallist at the 2010 Canadian Championships. She skated the following two seasons in the junior ranks with Benjamin Smyth. The duo placed tenth at the 2011 Canadian Championships and withdrew from the 2012 edition. They were coached by Bruno Yvars and Martine Patenaude in Montréal.

=== Partnership with Tanguay ===
Soucisse and Simon Tanguay began competing together in the 2012–2013 season, coached by Marie-France Dubreuil, Patrice Lauzon, and Pascal Denis in Montréal. They placed ninth competing on the junior level at the 2013 Canadian Championships.

The following season, they placed sixth at an ISU Junior Grand Prix event in Belarus and fifth in junior ice dancing at the 2014 Canadian Championships.

Soucisse/Tanguay made their senior-level debut in the 2014–2015 season. Their coaching team remained the same except for the addition of Romain Haguenauer. The duo finished ninth at the 2015 Canadian Championships.

They won bronze at the Lake Placid Ice Dance International, held in July 2015, and at the International Cup of Nice in October. After placing 8th at the 2016 Canadian Championships, they decided to part ways.

=== 2016–2017 season: Debut of Soucisse/Firus ===
Soucisse partnered with Shane Firus in 2016. They decided to train in Montréal under the guidance of Marie-France Dubreuil and Patrice Lauzon. The two placed seventh at the 2017 CS Autumn Classic International and had the same result at the International Cup of Nice. They finished fourth at the 2017 Canadian Championships.

=== 2017–2018 season: Four Continents silver ===
Soucisse/Firus participated in two ISU Challenger Series events, placing fifth at the 2017 CS U.S. International Figure Skating Classic and fourth at the 2017 CS Finlandia Trophy. They then made their Grand Prix debut at the 2017 Skate Canada International, where they placed seventh.

In January, they placed third in the short dance, fourth in the free dance, and fourth overall at the 2018 Canadian Championships. As the fourth-place finisher, they were assigned to the 2018 Four Continents Championships, their first ISU Championship event. They placed third in the short and second in the free, winning the silver medal. Firus said the two were "ecstatic" at the result, having achieved their goal of a medal.

Following the 2018 Winter Olympics, Tessa Virtue and Scott Moir withdrew from Canada's delegation to the 2018 World Championships in Milan. Soucisse/Firus, as the first alternates, took their places, making their World Championship debut. They placed eleventh in the short dance, fourteenth in the free dance, and fourteenth overall.

=== 2018–2019 season: Challenger Series bronze ===
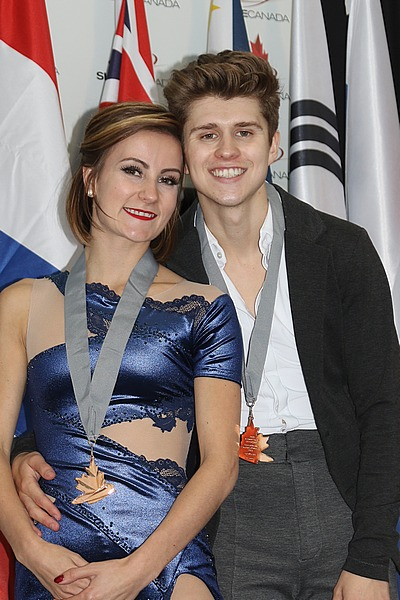
Soucisse/Firus during the medal ceremony at the 2018 CS Autumn Classic International

Soucisse/Firus began their season at the 2018 CS Autumn Classic International, where they won the bronze medal after placing third in the rhythm dance and fourth in the free dance. Firus remarked that he felt they had left a few technical points on the table but was otherwise satisfied with their performance. At their second Challenger event, the 2018 CS Finlandia Trophy, they finished fourth overall, having placed third in the rhythm dance and fifth in the free skate following an error from Soucisse on the one-foot step sequence in the latter.

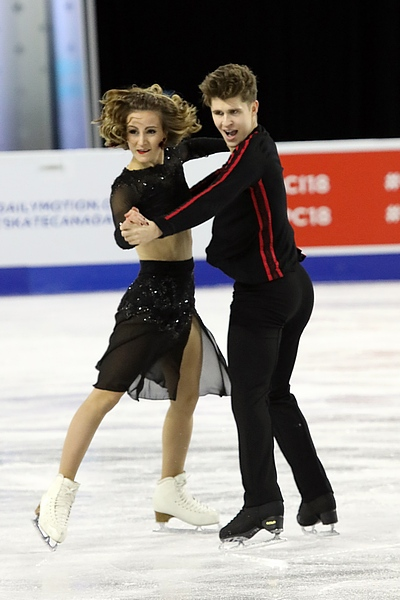
Soucisse/Firus at 2018 Skate Canada International

The duo had two Grand Prix events for the season, beginning with the 2018 Skate Canada International, where a fall on the midline step left them in ninth place after the rhythm dance. They subsequently placed seventh in the free dance and eighth overall. At their second event, 2018 NHK Trophy, they placed fifth in both segments and fifth overall, setting a new personal best in the free dance.

Following the Grand Prix, the two opted to return to their previous season's free dance, as the Weeknd medley they had been using had not received the scores they would have wanted. They placed fourth in the rhythm dance at the 2019 Canadian Championships. The free dance proved difficult, with Soucisse struggling on her twizzles and falling toward the end of the program. They were sixth in the free dance and dropped to fifth overall.

=== 2019–2020 season: Canadian national bronze ===
Soucisse/Firus were assigned to two Challenger events to begin the season, placing fifth at the 2019 CS Autumn Classic International before winning the bronze medal at the 2019 CS U.S. Classic.

On the Grand Prix, they were seventh to begin at the 2019 Internationaux de France. Soucisse/Firus placed eighth at the 2019 NHK Trophy.

With training mates and presumptive silver medalists Fournier Beaudry/Sørensen sitting out the 2020 Canadian Championships, Soucisse/Firus competed with Lajoie/Lagha for the silver medal. Both teams made errors in the rhythm dance, with Soucisse putting her free foot down to regain balance at one point in the Finnstep pattern dance, and Soucisse/Firus placed third in that segment. Early in the free dance, Firus fell on the one-foot step sequence, and they finished third in that segment as well, winning the bronze medal. They were assigned to compete at the 2020 Four Continents Championships in Seoul. They placed seventh at Four Continents, with Firus falling again in the free dance.

Following the results of Four Continents, Soucisse/Firus were named as alternates for the Canadian team to the 2020 World Figure Skating Championships and subsequently were added to the team after Fournier Beaudry/Sørensen were judged unable to compete. Shortly afterward, the World Championships were cancelled due to the COVID-19 pandemic, which they later called "a big low" for them. On April 16, 2020, Soucisse/Firus announced that they would be moving to train at the Scarboro Figure Skating Club under Carol and Jon Lane and Juris Razgulajevs.

=== 2020–2021 season ===
Soucisse/Firus were assigned to the 2020 Skate Canada International, but this event was also cancelled due to the pandemic. Due to a minor training injury, they were unable to participate in filming for the virtual 2021 Skate Canada Challenge and were granted a bye to the 2021 Canadian Championships. However, the championships were subsequently cancelled.

Soucisse/Firus were named as alternates to the 2021 World Championships. With Canada's mandatory two-week quarantine for returning athletes, however, no member of the World team was assigned to the 2021 World Team Trophy, and Soucisse/Firus were assigned as Canada's entry in the dance segment. They placed sixth in both of their segments of the competition, and Team Canada finished in sixth place.

=== 2021–2022 season ===
Soucisse/Firus made their season debut at the 2021 CS Autumn Classic International, where they placed fifth. They were eleventh at the 2021 CS Finlandia Trophy after a rhythm dance error left them in fourteenth place after that segment. Soucisse said, "there's some work to do on the rhythm dance, but the programs are taking form and trending in the right direction."

On the Grand Prix, Soucisse/Firus placed seventh at the 2021 Skate America. They were initially assigned to the 2021 Cup of China as their second Grand Prix, but following its cancellation they were reassigned to the 2021 Gran Premio d'Italia. They placed seventh there as well, with Firus saying they were happy with their free dance performance.

Competing at the 2022 Canadian Championships, Soucisse/Firus finished in fourth place. They were fourth as well at the 2022 Four Continents Championships.

=== 2022–2023 season: Last season representing Canada & switch to Ireland ===
Beginning the season at the 2022 CS Nebelhorn Trophy, Soucisse/Firus won the bronze medal, their first international medal since 2019. They finished eighth at the 2022 Skate America, their first Grand Prix assignment. Soucisse/Firus then came sixth at the 2022 Grand Prix of Espoo. They finished fourth at the 2023 Canadian Championships.

Soucisse/Firus skated at the 2023 Irish National Figure Skating Championships and became the first ice dancers to win the senior title in the history of the event.

=== 2023–2024 season: International debut for Ireland ===
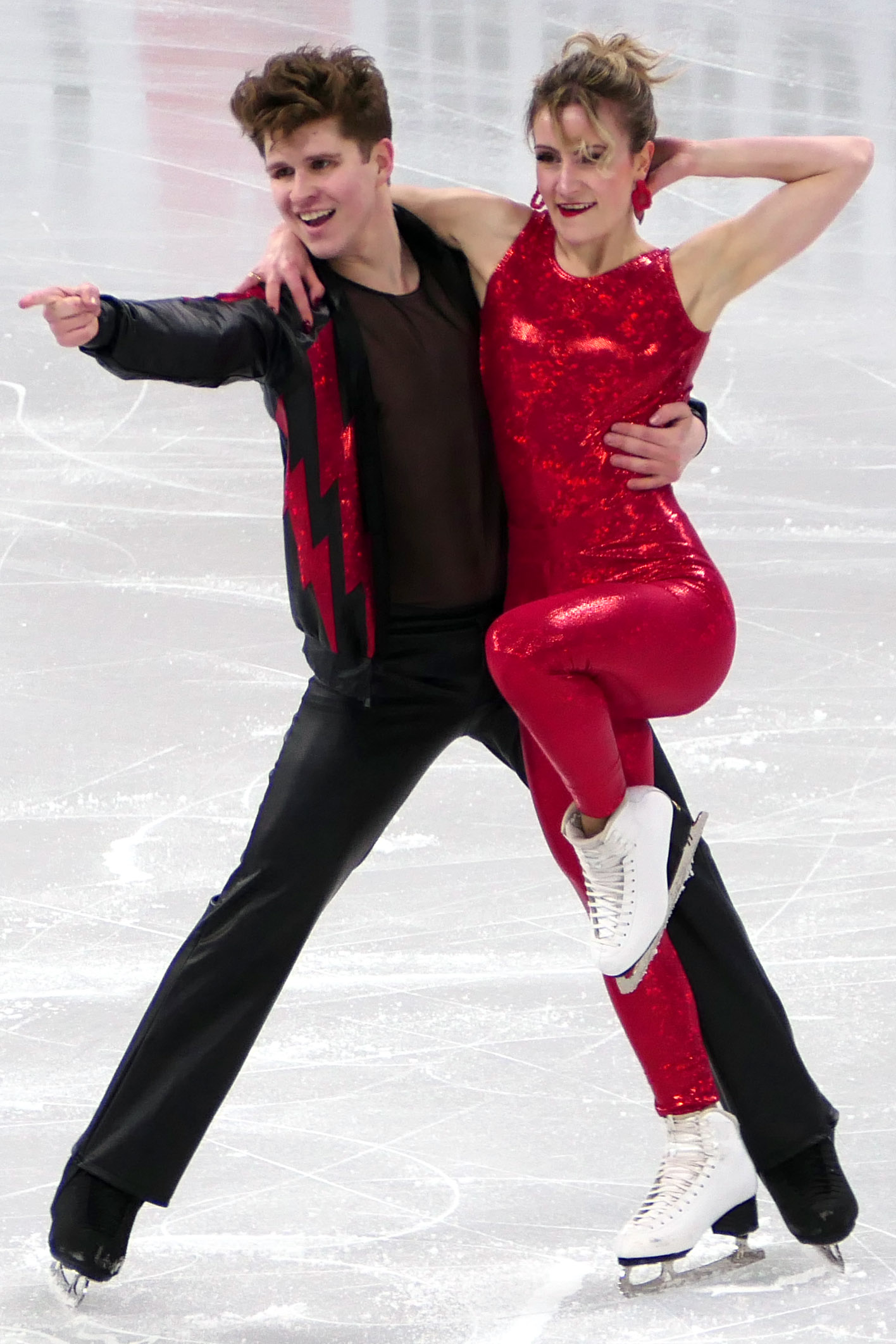
Soucisse/Firus during practice at the 2024 World Championships

Following their release from Skate Canada, Soucisse/Firus made their international debut for Ireland at the 2023 Bosphorus Cup where they came eighth. They finished twelfth at the 2023 CS Golden Spin of Zagreb. They became the first ice dancers to represent Ireland at an ISU Championship at the 2024 European Championships at which they placed thirteenth. They won a bronze medal at the 2024 Egna Trophy, the first international ice dance medal for Ireland. At the 2024 World Championships, they finished in twentieth place.

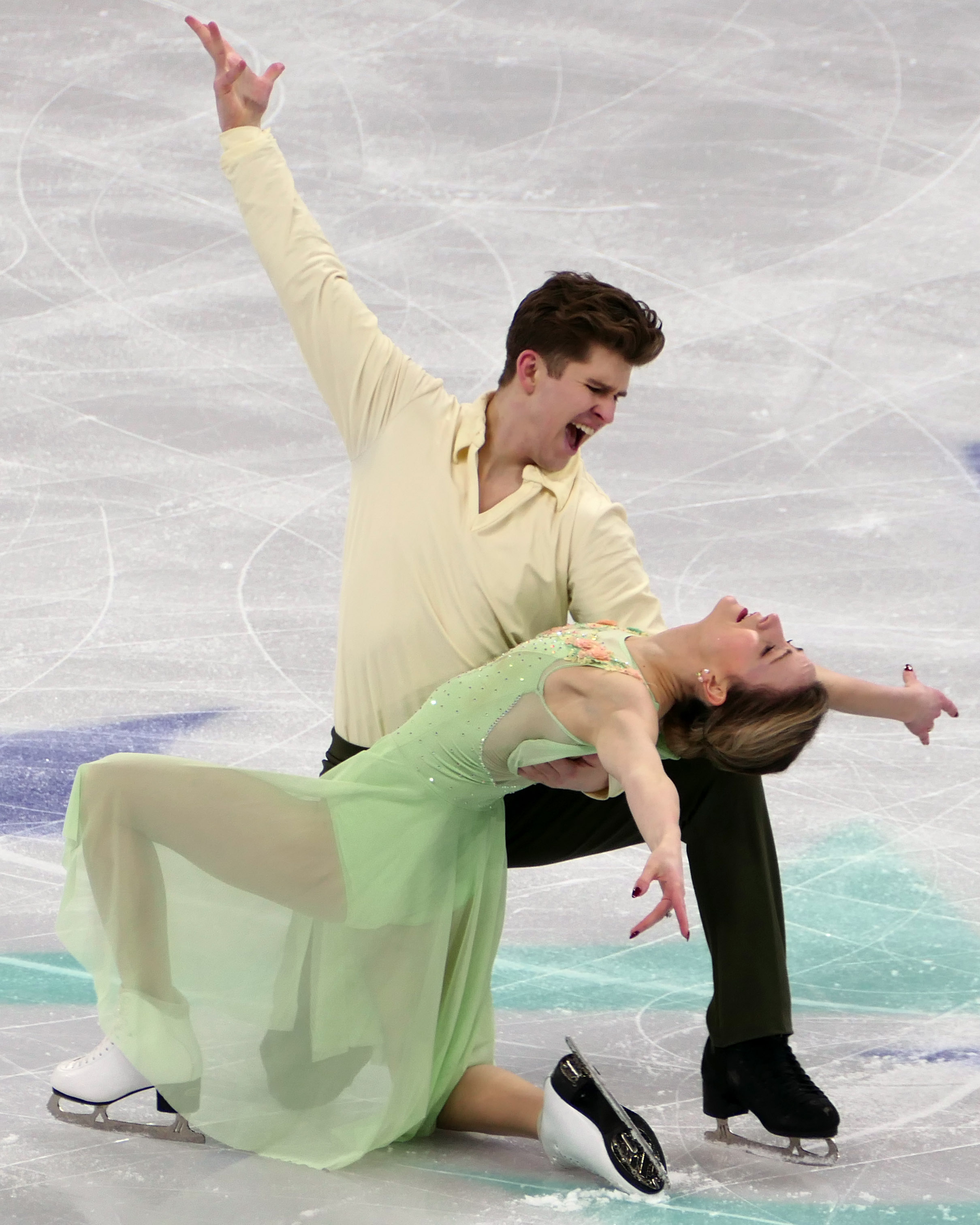
Soucisse and Firus performing their free dance at the 2024 World Championships

=== 2024–2025 season ===
Soucisse/Firus began their season with a fifth-place finish at the 2024 CS Lombardia Trophy. Going on to compete at the 2024 Trophée Métropole Nice Côte d'Azur, the team placed ninth in the rhythm dance but were forced to withdraw before the free dance due to Soucisse suffering from a chest infection. They would then go on to finish fourth at the 2024 Denkova-Staviski Cup and win bronze at the 2024 EduSport Trophy.

In January, Soucisse/Firus finished eighteenth at the 2025 European Championships in Tallinn, Estonia. They subsequently finished the season by placing twenty-eighth at the 2025 World Championships in Boston, Massachusetts, United States.

=== 2025–26 season: Final competitive season ===
Soucisse/Firus opened their season with a silver medal win at the 2025 International Ice Dance Dordrecht. They then went on to finish ninth at the ISU Skate to Milano before competing on the 2025–26 Challenger Series, placing tenth at the 2025 CS Warsaw Cup and eighth at the 2025 CS Tallinn Trophy.

In January, Soucisse/Firus finished nineteenth at the 2026 European Championships in Sheffield, England, United Kingdom.

On March 14, 2026, Firus announced his and Soucisse's retirement from competitive ice dance.

== Programs ==
=== Ice dance with Shane Firus ===
Season	Rhythm dance	Free dance	Exhibition
2025–2026	Step by Step; Call It What You Want; Step by Step (The C&C Vocal Club Mix) by New Kids on the Block choreo. by Carol Lane, Juris Razgulajevs, Alexandra Crenian	Riverdance; Reel Around the Sun; Home and the Heartland; Reel Around the Sun by Bill Whelan choreo. by Carol Lane, Juris Razgulajevs, Alexandra Crenian	
2024–2025	I Got the Feelin' by James Brown; Anti Love Song by Betty Davis; Get Up Offa That Thing by James Brown choreo. by Carol Lane, Juris Razgulajevs, Alexandra Crenian, Kaitlyn Weaver	It Had to Be You; Cry Me a River; It Had to Be You by Harry Connick Jr. choreo. by Carol Lane, Juris Razgulajevs, Alexandra Crenian, Kaitlyn Weaver	
2023–2024	Ghetto Life by Rick James; Fire and Desire by Rick James & Teena Marie; Super Freak by Rick James choreo. by Carol Lane, Juris Razgulajevs	Hier encore; La Bohème by Charles Aznavour choreo. by Carol Lane, Juris Razgulajevs	
2022–2023	Samba: Perdiendo el Control by De la Ghetto x Marco Acevedo; Rhumba: Quererte Bonito by Elena Rose & Sebastián Yatra; Samba: Perdiendo el Control by De la Ghetto x Marco Acevedo choreo. by Carol Lane, Juris Razgulajevs	Aloha Ke Akua; Creation’s Daughter; Aloha Ke Akua by Nahko and Medicine for the People choreo. by Carol Lane, Juris Razgulajevs	Simply the Best by Noah Reid
2021–2022	Blues: What's Love Got to Do with It by Tina Turner; Enough Is Enough by Barbra Streisand & Donna Summer choreo. by Carol Lane, Juris Razgulajevs	Hier encore; La Bohème by Charles Aznavour choreo. by Carol Lane, Juris Razgulajevs	
2020–2021	Swing: December, 1963 (Oh, What a Night) by The Four Seasons; Foxtrot: Can't Take My Eyes Off You by Frankie Valli (from Jersey Boys) choreo. by Marie-France Dubreuil, Romain Haguenauer	It's Not Unusual; Without Love; She's a Lady by Tom Jones choreo. by Marie-France Dubreuil, Romain Haguenauer, Carol Lane, Juris Razgulajevs	
2019–2020	Swing: December, 1963 (Oh, What a Night) by The Four Seasons; Foxtrot: Can't Take My Eyes Off You by Frankie Valli (from Jersey Boys) choreo. by Marie-France Dubreuil, Romain Haguenauer	It's Not Unusual; Without Love; Sex Bomb by Tom Jones choreo. by Marie-France Dubreuil, Romain Haguenauer	
2018–2019	Tango: "Felino"; Tango - Hip Hop: "Tango" by Electrotutango	I Won't Dance by Oscar Hammerstein II; Cheek to Cheek by Irving Berlin; I Won't Dance by Oscar Hammerstein II all performed by Tony Bennett, Lady Gaga; "Earned It" by The Weeknd; "Dirty Diana" by Michael Jackson performed by The Weeknd	
	Short dance		
2017–2018	Samba: "Bailando"; Rhumba: "El Perdedor"; Samba: "Let Me Be Your Lover" by Enrique Iglesias	"I Won't Dance"; "Cheek to Cheek"; "I Won't Dance" by Oscar Hammerstein II performed by Tony Bennett, Lady Gaga	
2016–2017	"Minnie the Moocher"; Soda Pop by Robbie Williams	"Impossible Love" by Melody Gardot; "Desde de Alma" composed by Osvaldo Pugliese; "Taquito Militar" by Ensemble Romulo Larrea, Veronica Larc	

=== With Tanguay ===
Season	Short dance	Free dance
2015–2016	"Mon Amant de Saint-Jean" by Patrick Bruel; "Petite Fleur" by Sidney Bechet	"Still Loving You"; "At First Sting" by the Scorpions
2014–2015		"The Mission" by Ennio Morricone
2013–2014	"All That Jazz" (from Chicago)	Flamenco; "Romance of Love" by Tom Jones; "Santa Marta" by Jesse Cook
2012–2013	"As Time Goes By" by Tony Bennett, The Ray Gelato Giants	Flamenco; "Romance of Love" by Tom Jones; "Santa Marta" by Jesse Cook

=== With Smyth ===
Season	Short dance	Free dance
2011–2012	Cha Cha Heels	"It Had to Be You" by Isham Jones
2010–2011	Waltz: "Flightless Bird, American Mouth" by Iron & Wine	

== Competitive highlights ==
- GP – Event of the ISU Grand Prix Series
- JGP – Event of the ISU Junior Grand Prix Series
- CS – Event of the ISU Challenger Series
- TBD – Assigned
- WD – Withdrew from competition

=== Ice dance with Shane Firus (for Ireland) ===
Competition placements at senior level
Season	2022–23	2023–24	2024–25	2025–26
World Championships		20th	28th	
European Championships		13th	18th	19th
Irish Championships	1st	1st		
CS Golden Spin of Zagreb		12th		
CS Lombardia Trophy			5th	
CS Tallinn Trophy			7th	8th
CS Warsaw Cup				10th
Bosphorus Cup		8th		
Denkova-Staviski Cup			4th	
EduSport Trophy			3rd	
Egna Spring Trophy		3rd		
ICE Dance Dordrecht				2nd
Skate to Milano				9th

=== Ice dance with Shane Firus (for Canada) ===
Competition placements at senior level
Season	2016–17	2017–18	2018–19	2019–20	2020–21	2021–22	2022–23
World Championships		14th					
Four Continents Championships		2nd		7th		4th	
Canadian Championships	4th	4th	5th	3rd	C	4th	4th
World Team Trophy					6th (6th)		
GP Finland							6th
GP France				7th			
GP Italy						7th	
GP NHK Trophy			5th	8th			
GP Skate America						7th	8th
GP Skate Canada		7th	8th				
CS Autumn Classic	7th		3rd	5th		5th	
CS Finlandia Trophy		4th	4th			11th	
CS Nebelhorn Trophy							3rd
CS U.S. Classic		5th		3rd			
Cup of Nice	7th						
Lake Placid Ice Dance				4th			

=== With Tanguay for Canada ===
International
Event	12–13	13–14	14–15	15–16
Cup of Nice				3rd
Lake Placid IDI				3rd
JGP Belarus		6th		
National
Canadian Champ.	9th J	5th J	9th	8th
Skate Canada Challenge	7th J	3rd J	2nd	1st

=== With Smyth for Canada ===
National
Event	10–11	11–12
Canadian Championships	10th J	WD
Skate Canada Challenge	8th J	12th J

== Detailed results ==
=== Ice dance with Shane Firus ===
ISU personal best scores in the +5/-5 GOE System
Segment	Type	Score	Event
Total	TSS	181.39	2019 CS U.S. International Classic
Rhythm dance	TSS	73.32	2020 Four Continents Championships
Rhythm dance	TES	41.55	2022 CS Nebelhorn Trophy
Rhythm dance	PCS	31.80	2020 Four Continents Championships
Free dance	TSS	110.06	2019 CS U.S. International Classic
Free dance	TES	62.82	2019 CS U.S. International Classic
Free dance	PCS	48.24	2019 CS U.S. International Classic

ISU personal best scores in the +3/-3 GOE System
Segment	Type	Score	Event
Total	TSS	164.96	2018 Four Continents Championships
Rhythm dance	TSS	65.11	2018 Four Continents Championships
Rhythm dance	TES	34.85	2018 World Championships
Rhythm dance	PCS	30.28	2018 Four Continents Championships
Free dance	TSS	99.85	2018 Four Continents Championships
Free dance	TES	54.58	2018 Four Continents Championships
Free dance	PCS	47.36	2018 World Championships

- Small medals for the short program and free skating are only awarded at ISU Championships.

==== For Ireland ====
Results in the 2022–23 season
Date	Event	RD		FD		Total	
Date	Event	P	Score	P	Score	P	Score
Jun 17–18, 2023	(Republic of Ireland) 2023 Irish Championships	1	63.84	1	96.66	1	160.50

Results in the 2023–24 season
Date	Event	RD		FD		Total	
Date	Event	P	Score	P	Score	P	Score
Nov 27 – Dec 3, 2023	(Turkey) 2023 Bosphorus Cup	14	56.41	7	101.77	8	158.18
Dec 6–9, 2023	(Croatia) 2023 CS Golden Spin of Zagreb	15	54.04	11	90.41	12	144.45
Jan 8–14, 2024	(Lithuania) 2024 European Championships	12	66.69	13	101.50	13	168.19
Feb 8–11, 2024	(Italy) Egna Dance Trophy	2	68.45	4	99.70	3	168.15
Mar 18–24, 2024	(Canada) 2024 World Championships	19	68.04	18	103.63	20	171.67
Jun 8–9, 2024	(Republic of Ireland) 2024 Irish Championships	1	69.74	1	100.33	1	170.07

Results in the 2024–25 season
Date	Event	RD		FD		Total	
Date	Event	P	Score	P	Score	P	Score
Sep 12–15, 2024	(Italy) 2024 CS Lombardia Trophy	4	69.52	6	101.82	5	171.34
Nov 5-10, 2024	(Bulgaria) 2024 Denkova-Staviski Cup	7	60.10	3	104.02	4	164.12
Nov 12–17, 2024	(Estonia) 2024 CS Tallinn Trophy	9	66.26	7	102.27	7	168.53
Jan 28 – Feb 2, 2025	(Estonia) 2025 European Championships	19	61.56	17	100.20	18	161.76
Mar 25–30, 2024	(United States) 2025 World Championships	28	58.68	—N/a	—N/a	28	58.68

Results in the 2025–26 season
Date	Event	RD		FD		Total	
Date	Event	P	Score	P	Score	P	Score
Aug 16–17, 2025	(Netherlands) 2025 International ICE Dance Dordrecht	2	65.27	3	94.81	2	160.08
Sep 18–21, 2025	(China) 2025 ISU Skate to Milano	8	64.53	11	93.89	9	158.42
Nov 19–23, 2025	(Poland) 2025 CS Warsaw Cup	8	68.46	11	103.45	10	171.91
Nov 25–30, 2025	(Estonia) 2025 CS Tallinn Trophy	8	64.56	8	102.99	8	167.55
Jan 13–18, 2026	(United Kingdom) 2026 European Championships	18	62.71	19	88.28	19	150.99

==== For Canada ====
2022–23 season
Date	Event	RD	FD	Total
January 9–15, 2023	2023 Canadian Championships	4; 72.74	5; 108.26	4; 181.00
November 25–27, 2022	2022 Grand Prix of Espoo	6; 72.38	7; 103.25	6; 175.63
October 21–23, 2022	2022 Skate America	9; 64.09	7; 99.56	8; 163.65
September 21–24, 2022	2022 CS Nebelhorn Trophy	3; 73.23	3; 103.12	3; 176.35
2021–22 season
Date	Event	RD	FD	Total
January 18–23, 2022	2022 Four Continents Championships	4; 69.15	4; 103.30	4; 172.45
January 6–12, 2022	2022 Canadian Championships	4; 72.55	5; 109.99	4; 182.54
November 5–7, 2021	2021 Gran Premio d'Italia	8; 63.40	7; 100.46	7; 163.86
October 22–24, 2021	2021 Skate America	8; 63.08	7; 98.94	7; 162.02
October 7–10, 2021	2021 CS Finlandia Trophy	14; 60.23	10; 102.72	11; 162.95
September 16–18, 2021	2021 CS Autumn Classic International	5; 65.11	5; 101.50	5; 166.61
2020–21 season
Date	Event	RD	FD	Total
April 15–18, 2021	2021 World Team Trophy	6; 65.06	6; 97.86	6T/6P; 162.92
2019–20 season
Date	Event	RD	FD	Total
February 4–9, 2020	2020 Four Continents Championships	6; 73.32	7; 101.09	7; 174.41
January 13–19, 2020	2020 Canadian Championships	3; 75.83	3; 114.46	3; 190.29
November 22–24, 2019	2019 NHK Trophy	9; 68.39	8; 103.62	8; 172.01
November 1–3, 2019	2019 Internationaux de France	7; 68.61	7; 107.19	7; 175.80
September 17–22, 2019	2019 CS U.S. International Classic	3; 71.33	3; 110.06	3; 181.39
September 12–14, 2019	2019 CS Autumn Classic International	2; 72.70	5; 100.20	5; 172.90
2018–19 season
Date	Event	RD	FD	Total
January 13–20, 2019	2019 Canadian Championships	4; 73.36	6; 90.12	5; 163.48
November 9–11, 2018	2018 NHK Trophy	5; 66.01	5; 103.83	5; 169.84
October 26–28, 2018	2018 Skate Canada International	9; 57.10	7; 99.64	8; 156.74
October 4–8, 2018	2018 CS Finlandia Trophy	3; 70.79	5; 101.48	4; 172.27
September 20–22, 2018	2018 CS Autumn Classic International	3; 65.38	4; 100.86	3; 166.24
2017–18 season
Date	Event	SD	FD	Total
March 19–25, 2018	2018 World Championships	11; 64.02	14; 95.44	14; 159.46
January 22–28, 2018	2018 Four Continents Championships	3; 65.11	2; 99.85	2; 164.96
January 8–14, 2018	2018 Canadian Championships	3; 70.97	4; 109.76	4; 180.73
October 27–29, 2017	2017 Skate Canada International	7; 57.77	6; 92.50	7; 150.27
October 6–8, 2017	2017 CS Finlandia Trophy	4; 60.50	4; 94.10	4; 154.60
September 13–17, 2017	2017 U.S. International Classic	5; 52.16	5; 85.27	5; 137.43
2016–17 season
Date	Event	SD	FD	Total
January 16–22, 2017	2017 Canadian Championships	4; 62.50	4; 96.77	4; 159.27
October 19–23, 2016	2016 International Cup of Nice	6; 54.90	9; 75.74	7; 130.64
Sept. 28 – Oct. 1, 2016	2016 CS Autumn Classic International	7; 48.78	7; 80.00	7; 128.78
