= 2019 CS Autumn Classic International =

- Type: ISU Challenger Series
- Date: September 12 – 14
- Season: 2019–20
- Location: Oakville, Ontario, Canada
- Host: Skate Canada
- Venue: Sixteen Mile Sports Complex

Champions
- Men's singles: (Japan) Yuzuru Hanyu
- Ladies' singles: (Japan) Rika Kihira
- Ice dance: (Canada) Piper Gilles / Paul Poirier
- Previous: 2018 CS Autumn Classic International
- Next: 2021 CS Autumn Classic International
- Next CS: 2019 CS Lombardia Trophy

The 2019 CS Autumn Classic International was held in September 2019 in Oakville, Ontario, Canada. It was part of the 2019–20 ISU Challenger Series. Medals were awarded in men's singles, ladies' singles, and ice dance.

== Entries ==
The International Skating Union published the list of entries on August 13, 2019.

Country	Men	Ladies	Ice dance
Australia	—	Kailani Craine	Matilda Friend / William Badaoui
Canada	Keegan Messing	Michelle Long	Piper Gilles / Paul Poirier
Canada	Conrad Orzel	Véronik Mallet	Carolane Soucisse / Shane Firus
France	Kévin Aymoz	Maé-Bérénice Méité	Marie-Jade Lauriault / Romain Le Gac
Great Britain	Harry Mattick	Nina Povey	Lilah Fear / Lewis Gibson
Hong Kong	Harrison Jon-Yen Wong	Hiu Ching Kwong	—
Israel	Mark Gorodnitsky	Maya Gorodnitsky	—
Japan	Yuzuru Hanyu	Rika Kihira	—
Kazakhstan	—	Anastassiya Khvan	—
Mexico	Donovan Carrillo	Andrea Montesinos Cantú	—
Netherlands	—	Niki Wories	—
Philippines	Christopher Caluza	—	—
Philippines	Edrian Paul Celestino	—	—
Russia	—	Evgenia Medvedeva	—
Singapore	—	Chloe Ing	—
South Korea	Cha Jun-hwan	Lim Eun-soo	—
Spain	—	—	Olivia Smart / Adrián Díaz
Switzerland	—	Alexia Paganini	—
United States	Camden Pulkinen	Karen Chen	—

=== Changes to preliminary assignments ===
Date	Discipline	Withdrew	Added	Notes	Ref.
August 19	Ladies	(Philippines) Cirinia Gillett	(Netherlands) Niki Wories		
August 22	Men	(United Kingdom) Peter James Hallam	—	Event conflict	
September 5	Ice dance	(Japan) Misato Komatsubara / Tim Koleto	—	Injury (Komatsubara)	
September 6	Ladies	(Canada) Gabrielle Daleman	—		
September 6	Ladies	(United States) Bradie Tennell	—	Injury	

== Results ==
=== Men ===
Rank	Name	Nation	Total points	SP		FS	
1	Yuzuru Hanyu	Japan	279.05	1	98.38	1	180.67
2	Kévin Aymoz	France	262.47	2	94.76	2	167.71
3	Keegan Messing	Canada	256.02	3	89.57	3	166.45
4	Cha Jun-hwan	South Korea	230.44	4	84.23	4	146.21
5	Camden Pulkinen	United States	216.25	5	81.34	6	134.91
6	Conrad Orzel	Canada	214.98	6	76.64	5	138.34
7	Mark Gorodnitsky	Israel	189.52	7	67.12	7	122.40
8	Christopher Caluza	Philippines	179.85	10	61.46	8	118.39
9	Edrian Paul Celestino	Philippines	179.21	9	64.01	9	115.20
10	Donovan Carrillo	Mexico	174.99	8	65.94	10	109.05
11	Harry Mattick	Great Britain	156.34	12	50.94	11	105.40
12	Harrison Jon-Yen Wong	Hong Kong	151.40	11	53.46	12	97.94

=== Ladies ===
Rank	Name	Nation	Total points	SP		FS	
1	Rika Kihira	Japan	224.16	1	78.18	1	145.98
2	Evgenia Medvedeva	Russia	217.43	2	75.14	2	142.29
3	Lim Eun-soo	South Korea	184.38	5	56.31	3	128.07
4	Karen Chen	United States	173.66	3	60.89	4	112.77
5	Kailani Craine	Australia	162.11	6	54.24	5	107.87
6	Alexia Paganini	Switzerland	158.33	4	58.87	8	99.46
7	Maé-Bérénice Méité	France	152.54	7	53.03	7	99.51
8	Michelle Long	Canada	149.52	12	48.87	6	100.65
9	Nina Povey	Great Britain	149.14	10	50.59	9	98.55
10	Andrea Montesinos Cantú	Mexico	148.55	8	52.59	12	95.96
11	Chloe Ing	Singapore	147.85	9	50.82	11	97.03
12	Véronik Mallet	Canada	147.74	11	50.23	10	97.51
13	Niki Wories	Netherlands	128.13	14	43.92	13	84.21
14	Hiu Ching Kwong	Hong Kong	123.60	13	45.18	14	78.42
15	Maya Gorodnitsky	Israel	109.97	15	40.24	15	69.73
16	Anastassiya Khvan	Kazakhstan	82.65	16	26.78	16	55.87

=== Ice dance ===
Rank	Name	Nation	Total points	RD		FD	
1	Piper Gilles / Paul Poirier	Canada	202.49	1	79.61	1	122.88
2	Lilah Fear / Lewis Gibson	Great Britain	184.09	5	70.06	2	114.03
3	Marie-Jade Lauriault / Romain Le Gac	France	182.91	3	71.50	3	111.41
4	Olivia Smart / Adrián Díaz	Spain	181.51	4	70.63	4	110.88
5	Carolane Soucisse / Shane Firus	Canada	172.90	2	72.70	5	100.20
6	Matilda Friend / William Badaoui	Australia	120.22	6	49.39	6	70.83
