= 2019–20 ISU Challenger Series =

Figure skating series

- Type: ISU Challenger Series
- Date: September 12 – December 7, 2019
- Season: 2019–20
- Previous: 2018–19 ISU Challenger Series
- Next: 2020–21 ISU Challenger Series

The 2019–20 ISU Challenger Series was held from September to December 2019. It was the sixth season that the ISU Challenger Series, a group of senior-level international figure skating competitions, was held.

== Competitions ==
This season, the series included the following events.

On July 22, 2019, the International Skating Union revoked the Chinese Taipei Skating Union's right to host the Asian Open Figure Skating Classic, scheduled to be held in Taipei, Taiwan. The event was replaced with the Hong Kong Skating Union's Asian Open Figure Skating Trophy. The Sports Administration of the Republic of China ordered the removal of Chinese Taipei Skating Union Secretary-General Eddy Wu for mishandling this situation. The Sports Administration also suspended funding of the Chinese Taipei Skating Union for one year.

Date	Event	Location	Notes	Results
September 12–14	(Canada) 2019 Autumn Classic International	Oakville, Ontario, Canada	No pairs	Details
September 13–15	(Italy) 2019 Lombardia Trophy	Bergamo, Italy	No pairs	Details
September 17–22	(United States) 2019 U.S. International Classic	Salt Lake City, Utah, United States		Details
September 19–21	(Slovakia) 2019 Nepela Memorial	Bratislava, Slovakia	No pairs	Details
September 25–28	(Germany) 2019 Nebelhorn Trophy	Oberstdorf, Germany		Details
October 11–13	(Finland) 2019 Finlandia Trophy	Espoo, Finland		Details
October 18–20	(Belarus) 2019 Ice Star	Minsk, Belarus	No pairs	Details
October 30 – November 3	(Chinese Taipei) 2019 Asian Open Classic	Cancelled		
October 30 – November 3	(China) 2019 Asian Open Trophy	Dongguan, China	No pairs	Details
November 14–17	(Poland) 2019 Warsaw Cup	Warsaw, Poland		Details
December 4–7	(Croatia) 2019 Golden Spin of Zagreb	Zagreb, Croatia		Details

== Medal summary ==
=== Men's singles ===
Competition	Gold	Silver	Bronze	Results
(Canada) Autumn Classic International	(Japan) Yuzuru Hanyu	(France) Kévin Aymoz	(Canada) Keegan Messing	Details
(Italy) Lombardia Trophy	(China) Jin Boyang	(Russia) Dmitri Aliev	(Italy) Matteo Rizzo	Details
(United States) U.S. International Classic	(Japan) Keiji Tanaka	(Japan) Sōta Yamamoto	(United States) Vincent Zhou	Details
(Slovakia) Nepela Memorial	(Russia) Dmitri Aliev	(Italy) Matteo Rizzo	(Latvia) Deniss Vasiļjevs	Details
(Germany) Nebelhorn Trophy	(Russia) Makar Ignatov	(Japan) Koshiro Shimada	(Israel) Alexei Bychenko	Details
(Finland) Finlandia Trophy	(Japan) Shoma Uno	(Japan) Sōta Yamamoto	(Canada) Roman Sadovsky	Details
(Belarus) Ice Star	(Italy) Daniel Grassl	(Russia) Artem Kovalev	(France) Adam Siao Him Fa	Details
(China) Asian Open Trophy	(Italy) Daniel Grassl	(United States) Andrew Torgashev	(United States) Ryan Dunk	Details
(Poland) Warsaw Cup	(Russia) Andrei Mozalev	(Russia) Petr Gumennik	(South Korea) Lee June-hyoung	Details
(Croatia) Golden Spin of Zagreb	(United States) Jason Brown	(Georgia (country)) Morisi Kvitelashvili	(Russia) Makar Ignatov	Details

=== Ladies' singles ===
Competition	Gold	Silver	Bronze	Results
(Canada) Autumn Classic International	(Japan) Rika Kihira	(Russia) Evgenia Medvedeva	(South Korea) Lim Eun-soo	Details
(Italy) Lombardia Trophy	(Russia) Anna Shcherbakova	(Russia) Elizaveta Tuktamysheva	(South Korea) You Young	Details
(United States) U.S. International Classic	(Japan) Satoko Miyahara	(South Korea) You Young	(United States) Amber Glenn	Details
(Slovakia) Nepela Memorial	(Russia) Alexandra Trusova	(Japan) Kaori Sakamoto	(South Korea) Kim Ha-nul	Details
(Germany) Nebelhorn Trophy	(United States) Mariah Bell	(South Korea) Kim Ye-lim	(Germany) Nicole Schott	Details
(Finland) Finlandia Trophy	(Russia) Alena Kostornaia	(Russia) Elizaveta Tuktamysheva	(Japan) Yuhana Yokoi	Details
(Belarus) Ice Star	(Russia) Sofia Samodurova	(South Korea) Kim Ha-nul	(Azerbaijan) Ekaterina Ryabova	Details
(China) Asian Open Trophy	(South Korea) Lim Eun-soo	(South Korea) Kim Ha-nul	(United States) Gabriella Izzo	Details
(Poland) Warsaw Cup	(Poland) Ekaterina Kurakova	(United States) Bradie Tennell	(Russia) Elizaveta Nugumanova	Details
(Croatia) Golden Spin of Zagreb	(Russia) Elizaveta Tuktamysheva	(Belarus) Viktoriia Safonova	(Germany) Nicole Schott	Details

=== Pairs ===
Competition	Gold	Silver	Bronze	Results
(United States) U.S. International Classic	(United States) Ashley Cain-Gribble / Timothy LeDuc	(Russia) Evgenia Tarasova / Vladimir Morozov	(China) Peng Cheng / Jin Yang	Details
(Germany) Nebelhorn Trophy	(Canada) Kirsten Moore-Towers / Michael Marinaro	(United States) Alexa Scimeca Knierim / Chris Knierim	(North Korea) Ryom Tae-ok / Kim Ju-sik	Details
(Finland) Finlandia Trophy	(Russia) Anastasia Mishina / Aleksandr Galliamov	(Russia) Alisa Efimova / Alexander Korovin	(Canada) Liubov Ilyushechkina / Charlie Bilodeau	Details
(Poland) Warsaw Cup	(United States) Jessica Calalang / Brian Johnson	(Russia) Alina Pepeleva / Roman Pleshkov	(Canada) Justine Brasseur / Mark Bardei	Details
(Croatia) Golden Spin of Zagreb	(United States) Ashley Cain-Gribble / Timothy LeDuc	(United States) Tarah Kayne / Danny O'Shea	(Germany) Minerva Fabienne Hase / Nolan Seegert	Details

=== Ice dance ===
Competition	Gold	Silver	Bronze	Results
(Canada) Autumn Classic International	(Canada) Piper Gilles / Paul Poirier	(United Kingdom) Lilah Fear / Lewis Gibson	(France) Marie-Jade Lauriault / Romain Le Gac	Details
(Italy) Lombardia Trophy	(Italy) Charlène Guignard / Marco Fabbri	(Canada) Laurence Fournier Beaudry / Nikolaj Sørensen	(Ukraine) Alexandra Nazarova / Maxim Nikitin	Details
(United States) U.S. International Classic	(United States) Madison Chock / Evan Bates	(United States) Christina Carreira / Anthony Ponomarenko	(Canada) Carolane Soucisse / Shane Firus	Details
(Slovakia) Nepela Memorial	(Russia) Victoria Sinitsina / Nikita Katsalapov	(Spain) Sara Hurtado / Kirill Khaliavin	(United States) Lorraine McNamara / Quinn Carpenter	Details
(Germany) Nebelhorn Trophy	(Canada) Laurence Fournier Beaudry / Nikolaj Sørensen	(United States) Kaitlin Hawayek / Jean-Luc Baker	(United States) Christina Carreira / Anthony Ponomarenko	Details
(Finland) Finlandia Trophy	(United States) Madison Chock / Evan Bates	(China) Wang Shiyue / Liu Xinyu	(Russia) Betina Popova / Sergey Mozgov	Details
(Belarus) Ice Star	(Spain) Sara Hurtado / Kirill Khaliavin	(Poland) Natalia Kaliszek / Maksym Spodyriev	(Ukraine) Alexandra Nazarova / Maxim Nikitin	Details
(China) Asian Open Trophy	(United States) Christina Carreira / Anthony Ponomarenko	(Russia) Ksenia Konkina / Pavel Drozd	(Georgia (country)) Maria Kazakova / Georgy Reviya	Details
(Poland) Warsaw Cup	(France) Marie-Jade Lauriault / Romain Le Gac	(Russia) Ksenia Konkina / Pavel Drozd	(United States) Caroline Green / Michael Parsons	Details
(Croatia) Golden Spin of Zagreb	(Italy) Charlène Guignard / Marco Fabbri	(Russia) Annabelle Morozov / Andrei Bagin	(United States) Caroline Green / Michael Parsons	Details

=== Medal standings ===
Rank	Nation	Gold	Silver	Bronze	Total
1	Russia	10	12	3	25
2	United States	8	6	8	22
3	Japan	5	4	1	10
4	Italy	4	1	1	6
5	Canada	3	1	5	9
6	South Korea	1	4	4	9
7	France	1	1	2	4
8	China	1	1	1	3
9	Poland	1	1	0	2
9	Spain	1	1	0	2
11	Georgia	0	1	1	2
12	Belarus	0	1	0	1
12	Great Britain	0	1	0	1
14	Germany	0	0	3	3
15	Ukraine	0	0	2	2
16	Azerbaijan	0	0	1	1
16	Israel	0	0	1	1
16	Latvia	0	0	1	1
16	North Korea	0	0	1	1
Totals (19 entries)		35	35	35	105

== Challenger Series rankings ==
The ISU Challenger Series rankings were formed by combining the two highest final scores of each skater or team.

=== Men’s singles ===
No.	Skater	Nation	First event	Score	Second event	Score	Total score
1	Dmitri Aliev	Russia	Lombardia Trophy	249.62	Nepela Memorial	255.32	504.94
2	Daniel Grassl	Italy	Ice Star	243.82	Asian Open Trophy	230.08	473.90
3	Sōta Yamamoto	Japan	U.S. International Classic	240.11	Finlandia Trophy	223.24	463.35
4	Matteo Rizzo	Italy	Lombardia Trophy	227.38	Nepela Memorial	232.70	460.08
5	Morisi Kvitelashvili	Georgia	Lombardia Trophy	220.96	Golden Spin of Zagreb	236.65	457.61

=== Ladies' singles ===
No.	Skater	Nation	First event	Score	Second event	Score	Total score
1	Elizaveta Tuktamysheva	Russia	Lombardia Trophy	214.38	Golden Spin of Zagreb	221.15	435.53
2	You Young	South Korea	Lombardia Trophy	200.89	U.S. International Classic	199.29	400.18
3	Lim Eun-soo	South Korea	Autumn Classic International	184.38	Asian Open Trophy	197.63	382.01
4	Kim Ye-lim	South Korea	Lombardia Trophy	182.60	Nepela Memorial	186.27	368.87
5	Sofia Samodurova	Russia	Ice Star	187.16	Golden Spin of Zagreb	180.61	367.77

=== Pairs ===
No.	Team	Nation	First event	Score	Second event	Score	Total score
1	Ashley Cain-Gribble / Timothy LeDuc	United States	U.S. International Classic	205.58	Golden Spin of Zagreb	199.43	405.01
2	Tarah Kayne / Danny O'Shea	United States	U.S. International Classic	174.02	Golden Spin of Zagreb	194.29	368.31
3	Minerva Fabienne Hase / Nolan Seegert	Germany	Nebelhorn Trophy	182.30	Golden Spin of Zagreb	185.09	367.39
4	Alisa Efimova / Alexander Korovin	Russia	Nebelhorn Trophy	171.46	Finlandia Trophy	194.28	365.74
5	Jessica Calalang / Brian Johnson	United States	U.S. International Classic	166.50	Warsaw Cup	191.46	357.96

=== Ice dance ===
No.	Team	Nation	First event	Score	Second event	Score	Total score
1	Charlène Guignard / Marco Fabbri	Italy	Lombardia Trophy	202.10	Golden Spin of Zagreb	202.18	404.28
2	Madison Chock / Evan Bates	United States	U.S. International Classic	202.40	Finlandia Trophy	198.26	400.66
3	Laurence Fournier Beaudry / Nikolaj Sørensen	Canada	Lombardia Trophy	189.36	Nebelhorn Trophy	201.00	390.36
4	Sara Hurtado / Kirill Khaliavin	Spain	Nepela Memorial	188.97	Ice Star	193.47	382.44
5	Christina Carreira / Anthony Ponomarenko	United States	Nebelhorn Trophy	190.35	Asian Open Trophy	191.55	381.90

== Top scores ==
=== Men's singles ===
Top 10 best scores in the men's combined total
No.	Skater	Nation	Score	Event
1	Yuzuru Hanyu	Japan	279.05	2019 Autumn Classic International
2	Jin Boyang	China	268.31	2019 Lombardia Trophy
3	Kévin Aymoz	France	262.47	2019 Autumn Classic International
4	Keegan Messing	Canada	256.02	2019 Autumn Classic International
5	Dmitri Aliev	Russia	255.32	2019 Nepela Memorial
6	Shoma Uno	Japan	255.23	2019 Finlandia Trophy
7	Keiji Tanaka	Japan	249.96	2019 U.S. International Classic
8	Daniel Grassl	Italy	243.82	2019 Ice Star
9	Jason Brown	United States	242.39	2019 Golden Spin of Zagreb
10	Sōta Yamamoto	Japan	240.11	2019 U.S. International Classic

Top 10 best scores in the men's short program
No.	Skater	Nation	Score	Event
1	Jin Boyang	China	101.89	2019 Lombardia Trophy
2	Dmitri Aliev	Russia	101.49	2019 Nepela Memorial
3	Yuzuru Hanyu	Japan	98.38	2019 Autumn Classic International
4	Kévin Aymoz	France	94.76	2019 Autumn Classic International
5	Sōta Yamamoto	Japan	92.81	2019 Finlandia Trophy
6	Shoma Uno	Japan	92.28	2019 Finlandia Trophy
7	Keegan Messing	Canada	89.57	2019 Autumn Classic International
8	Vincent Zhou	United States	89.03	2019 U.S. International Classic
9	Keiji Tanaka	Japan	88.76	2019 U.S. International Classic
10	Roman Sadovsky	Canada	86.34	2019 Finlandia Trophy

Top 10 best scores in the men's free skating
No.	Skater	Nation	Score	Event
1	Yuzuru Hanyu	Japan	180.67	2019 Autumn Classic International
2	Dmitri Aliev	Russia	168.44	2019 Lombardia Trophy
3	Kévin Aymoz	France	167.71	2019 Autumn Classic International
4	Jin Boyang	China	167.22	2019 Lombardia Trophy
5	Keegan Messing	Canada	166.45	2019 Autumn Classic International
6	Jason Brown	United States	162.95	2019 Golden Spin of Zagreb
6	Shoma Uno	Japan	162.95	2019 Finlandia Trophy
8	Keiji Tanaka	Japan	161.20	2019 U.S. International Classic
9	Daniel Grassl	Italy	158.40	2019 Ice Star
10	Sōta Yamamoto	Japan	157.23	2019 U.S. International Classic

=== Ladies' singles ===
Top 10 best scores in the ladies' combined total
No.	Skater	Nation	Score	Event
1	Alexandra Trusova	Russia	238.69	2019 Nepela Memorial
2	Alena Kostornaia	Russia	234.84	2019 Finlandia Trophy
3	Rika Kihira	Japan	224.16	2019 Autumn Classic International
4	Elizaveta Tuktamysheva	Russia	221.15	2019 Golden Spin of Zagreb
5	Anna Shcherbakova	Russia	218.20	2019 Lombardia Trophy
6	Evgenia Medvedeva	Russia	217.43	2019 Autumn Classic International
7	Mariah Bell	United States	205.13	2019 Nebelhorn Trophy
8	Satoko Miyahara	Japan	204.30	2019 U.S. International Classic
9	Ekaterina Kurakova	Poland	201.47	2019 Warsaw Cup
10	You Young	South Korea	200.89	2019 Lombardia Trophy

Top 10 best scores in the ladies' short program
No.	Skater	Nation	Score	Event
1	Rika Kihira	Japan	78.18	2019 Autumn Classic International
2	Alena Kostornaia	Russia	77.25	2019 Finlandia Trophy
3	Evgenia Medvedeva	Russia	75.14	2019 Autumn Classic International
4	Alexandra Trusova	Russia	74.91	2019 Nepela Memorial
5	Satoko Miyahara	Japan	74.16	2019 U.S. International Classic
6	Elizaveta Tuktamysheva	Russia	73.66	2019 Lombardia Trophy
7	You Young	South Korea	70.47	2019 Lombardia Trophy
8	Bradie Tennell	United States	70.10	2019 Warsaw Cup
9	Mariah Bell	United States	68.45	2019 Nebelhorn Trophy
10	Anna Shcherbakova	Russia	67.73	2019 Lombardia Trophy

Top 10 best scores in the ladies' free skating
No.	Skater	Nation	Score	Event
1	Alexandra Trusova	Russia	163.78	2019 Nepela Memorial
2	Alena Kostornaia	Russia	157.59	2019 Finlandia Trophy
3	Anna Shcherbakova	Russia	150.47	2019 Lombardia Trophy
4	Elizaveta Tuktamysheva	Russia	148.29	2019 Golden Spin of Zagreb
5	Rika Kihira	Japan	145.98	2019 Autumn Classic International
6	Evgenia Medvedeva	Russia	142.29	2019 Autumn Classic International
7	You Young	South Korea	141.25	2019 U.S. International Classic
8	Mariah Bell	United States	136.68	2019 Nebelhorn Trophy
9	Ekaterina Kurakova	Poland	135.39	2019 Warsaw Cup
10	Kaori Sakamoto	Japan	134.45	2019 Nepela Memorial

=== Pairs ===
Top 10 best scores in the pairs' combined total
No.	Team	Nation	Score	Event
1	Kirsten Moore-Towers / Michael Marinaro	Canada	210.35	2019 Nebelhorn Trophy
2	Anastasia Mishina / Aleksandr Galliamov	Russia	210.18	2019 Finlandia Trophy
3	Ashley Cain-Gribble / Timothy LeDuc	United States	205.58	2019 U.S. International Classic
4	Alexa Scimeca Knierim / Chris Knierim	United States	202.41	2019 Nebelhorn Trophy
5	Evgenia Tarasova / Vladimir Morozov	Russia	194.69	2019 U.S. International Classic
6	Tarah Kayne / Danny O'Shea	United States	194.29	2019 Golden Spin of Zagreb
7	Alisa Efimova / Alexander Korovin	Russia	194.28	2019 Finlandia Trophy
8	Liubov Ilyushechkina / Charlie Bilodeau	Canada	193.58	2019 Finlandia Trophy
9	Jessica Calalang / Brian Johnson	United States	191.46	2019 Warsaw Cup
10	Alina Pepeleva / Roman Pleshkov	Russia	188.79	2019 Warsaw Cup

Top 10 best scores in the pairs' short program
No.	Team	Nation	Score	Event
1	Ashley Cain-Gribble / Timothy LeDuc	United States	76.23	2019 U.S. International Classic
2	Anastasia Mishina / Aleksandr Galliamov	Russia	74.99	2019 Finlandia Trophy
3	Evgenia Tarasova / Vladimir Morozov	Russia	74.85	2019 U.S. International Classic
4	Kirsten Moore-Towers / Michael Marinaro	Canada	71.76	2019 Nebelhorn Trophy
5	Alexa Scimeca Knierim / Chris Knierim	United States	70.83	2019 Nebelhorn Trophy
6	Alisa Efimova / Alexander Korovin	Russia	69.12	2019 Finlandia Trophy
7	Minerva Fabienne Hase / Nolan Seegert	Germany	68.30	2019 Golden Spin of Zagreb
8	Jessica Calalang / Brian Johnson	United States	68.20	2019 Warsaw Cup
9	Liubov Ilyushechkina / Charlie Bilodeau	Canada	68.07	2019 Finlandia Trophy
10	Peng Cheng / Jin Yang	China	67.90	2019 U.S. International Classic

Top 10 best scores in the pairs' free skating
No.	Team	Nation	Score	Event
1	Kirsten Moore-Towers / Michael Marinaro	Canada	138.59	2019 Nebelhorn Trophy
2	Anastasia Mishina / Aleksandr Galliamov	Russia	135.19	2019 Finlandia Trophy
3	Alexa Scimeca Knierim / Chris Knierim	United States	131.58	2019 Nebelhorn Trophy
4	Ashley Cain-Gribble / Timothy LeDuc	United States	129.35	2019 U.S. International Classic
5	Tarah Kayne / Danny O'Shea	United States	128.09	2019 Golden Spin of Zagreb
6	Liubov Ilyushechkina / Charlie Bilodeau	Canada	125.51	2019 Finlandia Trophy
7	Alisa Efimova / Alexander Korovin	Russia	125.16	2019 Finlandia Trophy
8	Jessica Calalang / Brian Johnson	United States	123.26	2019 Warsaw Cup
9	Alina Pepeleva / Roman Pleshkov	Russia	121.73	2019 Warsaw Cup
10	Haven Denney / Brandon Frazier	United States	120.47	2019 Nebelhorn Trophy

=== Ice dance ===
Top 10 best scores in the combined total (ice dance)
No.	Team	Nation	Score	Event
1	Piper Gilles / Paul Poirier	Canada	202.49	2019 Autumn Classic International
2	Madison Chock / Evan Bates	United States	202.40	2019 U.S. International Classic
3	Charlène Guignard / Marco Fabbri	Italy	202.18	2019 Golden Spin of Zagreb
4	Laurence Fournier Beaudry / Nikolaj Sørensen	Canada	201.00	2019 Nebelhorn Trophy
5	Victoria Sinitsina / Nikita Katsalapov	Russia	198.14	2019 Nepela Memorial
6	Sara Hurtado / Kirill Khaliavin	Spain	193.47	2019 Ice Star
7	Kaitlin Hawayek / Jean-Luc Baker	United States	192.47	2019 Nebelhorn Trophy
8	Annabelle Morozov / Andrei Bagin	Russia	191.71	2019 Golden Spin of Zagreb
9	Christina Carreira / Anthony Ponomarenko	United States	191.55	2019 Asian Open Trophy
10	Lilah Fear / Lewis Gibson	Great Britain	188.25	2019 Nebelhorn Trophy

Top 10 best scores in the rhythm dance
No.	Team	Nation	Score	Event
1	Charlène Guignard / Marco Fabbri	Italy	83.31	2019 Golden Spin of Zagreb
2	Laurence Fournier Beaudry / Nikolaj Sørensen	Canada	81.16	2019 Nebelhorn Trophy
3	Madison Chock / Evan Bates	United States	80.18	2019 U.S. International Classic
4	Piper Gilles / Paul Poirier	Canada	79.61	2019 Autumn Classic International
5	Annabelle Morozov / Andrei Bagin	Russia	78.75	2019 Golden Spin of Zagreb
6	Victoria Sinitsina / Nikita Katsalapov	Russia	78.44	2019 Nepela Memorial
7	Christina Carreira / Anthony Ponomarenko	United States	78.40	2019 Asian Open Trophy
8	Lorraine McNamara / Quinn Carpenter	United States	78.39	2019 Golden Spin of Zagreb
9	Sara Hurtado / Kirill Khaliavin	Spain	77.03	2019 Nepela Memorial
10	Olivia Smart / Adrián Díaz	Spain	75.80	2019 Nebelhorn Trophy

Top 10 best scores in the free dance
No.	Team	Nation	Score	Event
1	Piper Gilles / Paul Poirier	Canada	122.88	2019 Autumn Classic International
2	Charlène Guignard / Marco Fabbri	Italy	122.63	2019 Lombardia Trophy
3	Madison Chock / Evan Bates	United States	122.22	2019 U.S. International Classic
4	Laurence Fournier Beaudry / Nikolaj Sørensen	Canada	119.84	2019 Nebelhorn Trophy
5	Victoria Sinitsina / Nikita Katsalapov	Russia	119.70	2019 Nepela Memorial
6	Sara Hurtado / Kirill Khaliavin	Spain	117.39	2019 Ice Star
7	Kaitlin Hawayek / Jean-Luc Baker	United States	116.70	2019 Nebelhorn Trophy
8	Marie-Jade Lauriault / Romain Le Gac	France	114.08	2019 Warsaw Cup
9	Lilah Fear / Lewis Gibson	Great Britain	114.03	2019 Autumn Classic International
10	Christina Carreira / Anthony Ponomarenko	United States	113.36	2019 Nebelhorn Trophy
