= Audrey Lu =

American pair skater (born 2002)

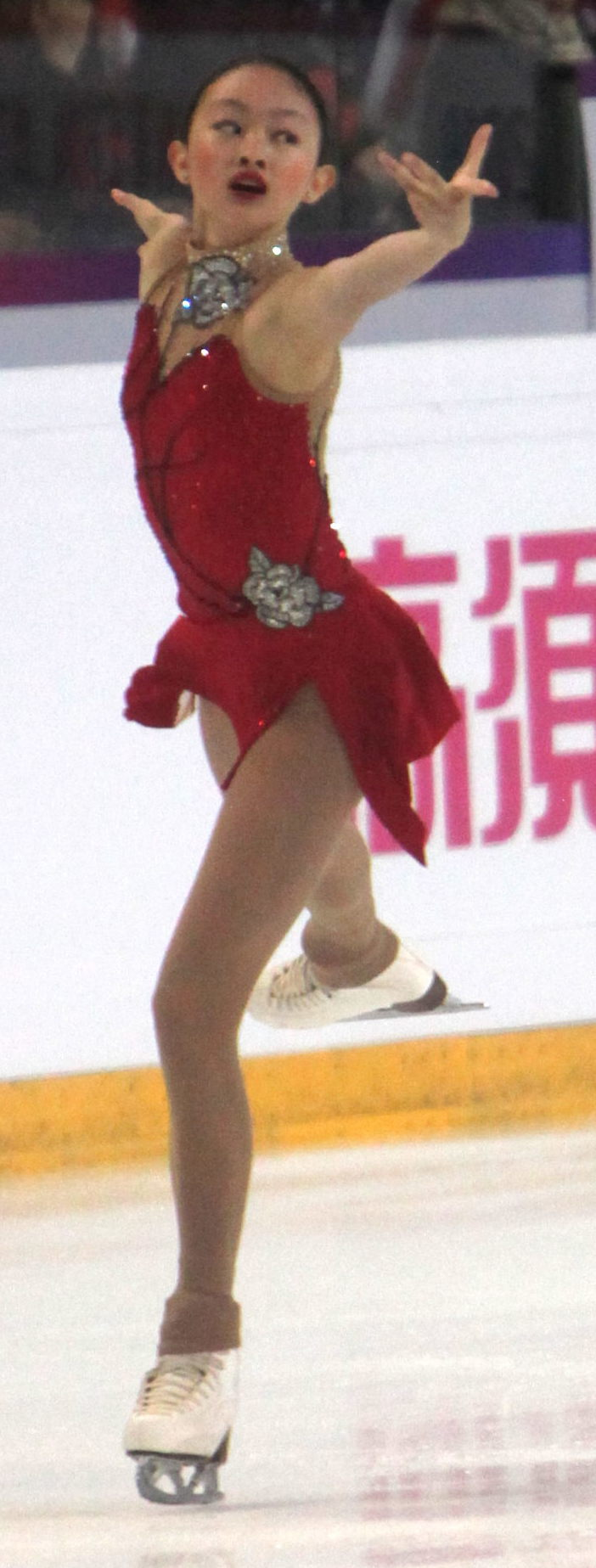
- Audrey Lu in the free skate of the 2018 Internationaux de France

Personal information
- Born: August 30, 2002 (age 24) Dallas, Texas, U.S.
- Home town: Frisco, Texas, U.S.
- Height: 5 ft 4 in (1.62 m)

Figure skating career
- Country: United States
- Partner: Misha Mitrofanov (2016–22)
- Skating club: Skating Club of Boston
- Began skating: 2007
- Retired: 2022
Medal record
Representing United States
Figure skating: Pairs
Four Continents Championships
Gold medal – first place	2022 Tallinn	Pairs

Audrey Lu (born August 30, 2002) is an American pair skater. With her former skating partner, Misha Mitrofanov, she is the 2022 Four Continents champion, 2021 CS Golden Spin of Zagreb champion, 2018 CS U.S. International Classic silver medalist, and 2022 U.S. national bronze medalist.

== Personal life ==
Lu was born on August 30, 2002, in Dallas, Texas. She attended Spring Creek Academy in Plano, Texas. She graduated from Spring Creek Academy as a Salutatorian. She is attending the University of California, Los Angeles.

== Career ==
=== Early years ===
Lu began learning to skate in 2007. She won the 2015 Southwestern Regional Championships. She placed seventh in the juvenile ladies' event at the 2015 U.S. Championships and sixth in the intermediate category at the 2016 U.S. Championships.

=== 2016–2017 season ===
Lu's pair skating career began when she teamed up with Misha Mitrofanov in May 2016. Making their international debut, the pair placed twelfth at an ISU Junior Grand Prix (JGP) event in the Czech Republic in September 2016. Their season came to an end in November, after Mitrofanov dislocated his shoulder at the Midwestern Sectional Championships. He underwent shoulder surgery and resumed training after six months.

=== 2017–2018 season ===
Lu/Mitrofanov placed fifth in both of their JGP assignments. In January, they won the junior pairs' title at the 2018 U.S. Championships; they ranked first in both segments and outscored the silver medalists by 17.74 points. In March, the pair placed fifth (sixth in the short program, fourth in the free skate) at the 2018 World Junior Championships in Sofia, Bulgaria.

=== 2018–2019 season ===
Making their senior international debut, Lu/Mitrofanov won silver at the 2018 CS U.S. Classic in mid-September, and then placed fifth at the 2018 CS Nebelhorn Trophy. They were invited to two Grand Prix events, the 2018 NHK Trophy and 2018 Internationaux de France, where they placed seventh and sixth, respectively. Debuting at senior Nationals at the 2019 U.S. Championships, they placed sixth.

=== 2019–2020 season ===
Lu/Mitrofanov began the season with a fifth-place finish at the 2019 CS U.S. Classic. On the Grand Prix, they were eighth at the 2019 Rostelecom Cup. They concluded the season at the 2020 U.S. Championships, where they finished sixth.

=== 2020–2021 season ===
With the COVID-19 pandemic affecting international travel, Lu/Mitrofanov were assigned to attend the 2020 Skate America, the Grand Prix having been arranged primarily based on training location. They placed third in the short program. Coming fourth in the free skate, their lead from the short program was nevertheless enough to remain in third place overall, winning their first Grand Prix medal as bronze medalists.

Competing at the 2021 U.S. Championships, Lu/Mitrofanov placed third in the short program with a clean skate. They were fourth in the free skate, placing fourth overall and winning the pewter medal.

=== 2021–2022 season ===
After beginning the season with some minor America competitions, Lu/Mitrofanov competed on the Grand Prix at the 2021 NHK Trophy, finishing in fifth place. They went on to finish in fourth at the 2021 Rostelecom Cup. They next competed at the 2021 CS Golden Spin of Zagreb, where they won the gold medal, their first Challenger title.

Lu/Mitrofanov won the bronze medal at the 2022 U.S. Championships. Mitrofanov said they were "very happy and grateful" for the event and its large audience. As a result of their placement, they were assigned to compete at the 2022 Four Continents Championships in Tallinn, and named as alternates to the American Olympic team. Lu/Mitrofanov won both segments of the Four Continents competition to take the gold medal. The pair parted ways following the season due to Lu wishing to prioritize attending university.

In March, the cast list for the ice show An Evening with Champions was announced, announcing Audrey Lu skating a solo.

In July, Audrey Lu represented UCLA as a single skater at the 2022 U.S. Collegiate Championships and Invitational U.S. Collegiate Figure Skating Championships and won the silver medal.

== Programs ==
=== Women's singles ===
Season	Short program	Free skating
2024–2025	Lovely - Billie Eilish feat. Khalid by Billie Eilish	Moonlight Sonata by Ludwig van Beethoven
2023–2024	Can't Help Falling in Love - Dark Version feat. Brooke by Tommee Profitt	No Time to Die by Billie Eilish
2022–2023	Primavera by Ludovico Einaudi	No Time to Die by Billie Eilish

=== Pair Skating with Mitrofanov ===
Season	Short program	Free skating	Exhibition
2021–2022	Toxic; Survivor by 2WEI	Ancient Lands by Ronan Hardiman; In Too Deep; Illusions by Thomas Bergersen	
2020–2021	The Show Must Go On (from Moulin Rouge!)	Charlie Chaplin medley	
2019–2020	Skyfall by Adele	Notre-Dame de Paris by Riccardo Cocciante, Luc Plamondon, Will Jennings	
2018–2019	Masquerade: Waltz by Aram Khachaturian	El Tango de Roxanne; Come What May (from Moulin Rouge!)	
2017–2018	Once Upon a December (from Anastasia) by Deana Carter	Memory (from Cats); The Music of the Night (from The Phantom of the Opera) by Andrew Lloyd Webber	The Prayer by Celine Dion and Andrea Bocelli
2016–2017	O Fortuna (from Carmina Burana) by Carl Orff	Memory (from Cats); The Music of the Night (from The Phantom of the Opera) by Andrew Lloyd Webber	

== Competitive highlights ==
GP: Grand Prix; CS: Challenger Series; JGP: Junior Grand Prix. Pewter medals (4th place) awarded only at U.S. national, sectional, and regional events.

=== Pairs with Mitrofanov ===
International
Event	16–17	17–18	18–19	19–20	20–21	21–22
Four Continents						1st
GP France			6th			
GP NHK Trophy			7th			5th
GP Rostelecom				8th		4th
GP Skate America					3rd	
CS Golden Spin						1st
CS Nebelhorn			5th			
CS U.S. Classic			2nd	5th		
Challenge Cup				2nd		
Cranberry Cup						6th
John Nicks Challenge						3rd
International: Junior
Junior Worlds		5th				
JGP Belarus		5th				
JGP Czech Rep.	12th					
JGP Poland		5th				
National
U.S. Champ.		1st J	6th	6th	4th	3rd

== Detailed results ==
Current personal best scores are highlighted in bold.

Small medals for short and free programs awarded only at ISU Championships.

=== Senior results ===
**2021–2022 season**
Date	Event	SP	FS	Total
January 18–23, 2022	2022 Four Continents Championships	1; **68.35**	1; 120.75	1; 189.10
January 3–9, 2022	2022 U.S. Championships	3; 68.11	3; 123.43	3; 191.54
December 7–11, 2021	2021 CS Golden Spin of Zagreb	3; 66.41	2; **128.91**	1; **195.32**
November 12–14, 2021	2021 NHK Trophy	5; 64.95	5; 125.08	5; 190.03
November 26–28, 2021	2021 Rostelecom Cup	4; 64.97	4; 121.19	4; 186.16
September 9–10, 2021	2021 John Nicks Pairs Challenge	4; 66.16	3; 129.04	3; 195.20
August 11–15, 2021	2021 Cranberry Cup International	5; 60.75	9; 98.06	6; 158.81
**2020–2021 season**
Date	Event	SP	FS	Total
January 11–21, 2021	2021 U.S. Championships	3; 69.56	4; 128.41	4; 197.97
October 23–24, 2020	2020 Skate America	3; 67.52	4; 122.13	3; 189.65
**2019–2020 season**
Date	Event	SP	FS	Total
February 20–23, 2020	2020 International Challenge Cup	2; 62.94	2; 110.54	2; 173.48
January 20–26, 2020	2020 U.S. Championships	5; 65.06	6; 116.43	6; 181.49
November 15–17, 2019	2019 Rostelecom Cup	8; 54.03	8; 99.58	8; 153.61
September 17–22, 2019	2019 CS U.S. Classic	5; 63.87	5; 104.63	5; 168.50
**2018–2019 season**
Date	Event	SP	FS	Total
January 19–27, 2019	2019 U.S. Championships	5; 66.21	6; 116.21	6; 182.42
November 23–25, 2019	2018 Internationaux de France	6; 56.71	7; 100.57	6; 157.28
November 9–11, 2018	2018 NHK Trophy	7; 52.35	7; 96.90	7; 149.25
September 26–29, 2018	2018 CS Nebelhorn Trophy	6; 49.47	4; 107.75	5; 157.22
September 12–16, 2018	2018 CS U.S. Classic	2; 57.25	2; 86.68	2; 143.93

=== Junior results ===
**2017–2018 season**
Date	Event	Level	SP	FS	Total
March 5–11, 2018	2018 World Junior Championships	Junior	6; 54.38	4; 105.71	5; 160.09
December 29–January 8, 2018	2018 U.S. Junior Championships	Junior	1; 60.80	1; 112.51	1; 173.31
October 4–7, 2017	2017 JGP Poland	Junior	6; 51.53	5; 99.12	5; 150.65
September 20–23, 2017	2017 JGP Belarus	Junior	4; 52.94	6; 79.19	5; 132.13
**2016–2017 season**
Date	Event	Level	SP	FS	Total
August 31–September 3, 2016	2016 JGP Czech Republic	Junior	12; 44.71	12; 78.48	12; 123.19
