= 2018 CS U.S. International Figure Skating Classic =

Figure skating competition

2018 CS U.S. International Classic
- Type: ISU Challenger Series
- Date: September 12 – 16
- Season: 2018–19
- Location: Salt Lake City, Utah, United States
- Host: U.S. Figure Skating
- Venue: Salt Lake City Sports Complex

Champions
- Men's singles: (Canada) Nam Nguyen
- Ladies' singles: (Japan) Satoko Miyahara
- Pairs: (United States) Ashley Cain / Timothy LeDuc
- Ice dance: (United States) Madison Hubbell / Zachary Donohue
- Previous: 2018 CS Lombardia Trophy
- Next: 2018 CS Ondrej Nepela Trophy

The 2018 CS U.S. International Figure Skating Classic was held in September 2018 in Salt Lake City, Utah. It was part of the 2018–19 ISU Challenger Series. Medals were awarded in the disciplines of men's singles, ladies' singles, pair skating, and ice dancing.

== Entries ==
The International Skating Union published the list of entries on August 17, 2018.

Country	Men	Ladies	Pairs	Ice dance
Armenia	Slavik Hayrapetyan			
Australia	Andrew Dodds; Jordan Dodds	Katie Pasfield	Ekaterina Alexandrovskaya / Harley Windsor	
Brazil		Isadora Williams		
Bulgaria				Teodora Markova / Simon Daze
Canada	Nam Nguyen	Gabrielle Daleman	Camille Ruest / Andrew Wolfe	Haley Sales / Nikolas Wamsteeker
Chinese Taipei	Chih-Sheng Chang; Micah Tang			
Czech Republic	Michal Březina	Eliška Březinová		
France				Marie-Jade Lauriault / Romain Le Gac
Hungary				Emily Lauren Monaghan / Ilias Fourati
Japan	Hiroaki Sato	Satoko Miyahara; Yuna Shiraiwa		Misato Komatsubara / Tim Koleto
Mexico		Andrea Montesinos Cantu		
New Zealand		Brooke Tamepo		
Philippines	Yamato Rowe			
South Korea		Kim Ye-lim; Lim Eun-soo		
Sweden		Josefin Taljegard		
Ukraine	Yaroslav Paniot			
United States	Jimmy Ma; Vincent Zhou	Courtney Hicks; Brynne McIsaac; Akari Nakahara	Ashley Cain / Timothy LeDuc; Winter Deardorff / Max Settlage; Audrey Lu / Misha Mitrofanov	Christina Carreira / Anthony Ponomarenko; Madison Hubbell / Zachary Donohue; Karina Manta / Joseph Johnson

=== Changes to preliminary assignments ===
Date	Discipline	Withdrew	Added	Reason/Other notes	Refs
August 29	Ladies	(United States) Karen Chen	(Australia) Katie Pasfield		
August 29	Pairs	(United States) Jessica Pfund / Joshua Santillan	(United States) Winter Deardorff / Max Settlage		
August 29	Pairs	(United States) Nadine Wang / Spencer Akira Howe	N/A		

== Results ==
=== Men ===
Rank	Name	Nation	Total	SP		FS	
1	Nam Nguyen	Canada	213.52	1	80.28	2	133.24
2	Michal Březina	Czech Republic	208.27	2	79.57	4	128.70
3	Jimmy Ma	United States	206.10	4	73.21	3	132.89
4	Vincent Zhou	United States	204.62	6	61.72	1	142.90
5	Slavik Hayrapetyan	Armenia	188.93	5	69.00	6	119.93
6	Hiroaki Sato	Japan	176.30	9	56.34	5	119.96
7	Harrison Jon-Yen Wong	Hong Kong	171.59	7	57.80	7	113.79
8	Yaroslav Paniot	Ukraine	165.79	3	74.97	10	90.82
9	Andrew Dodds	Australia	160.90	10	54.77	8	106.13
10	Micah Tang	Chinese Taipei	154.90	8	56.81	9	98.09
11	Jordan Dodds	Australia	130.13	12	45.62	11	84.51
12	Chih-Sheng Chang	Chinese Taipei	109.64	13	40.17	12	69.47
13	Yamato Rowe	Philippines	109.55	11	49.75	13	59.80

=== Ladies ===
Rank	Name	Nation	Total	SP		FS	
1	Satoko Miyahara	Japan	201.23	1	67.53	1	133.70
2	Lim Eun-soo	South Korea	187.30	2	64.85	2	122.45
3	Kim Ye-lim	South Korea	176.65	4	61.30	5	115.35
4	Yi Christy Leung	Hong Kong	173.83	5	58.10	3	115.73
5	Yuna Shiraiwa	Japan	170.74	6	55.35	4	115.39
6	Gabrielle Daleman	Canada	169.15	3	63.28	7	105.87
7	Courtney Hicks	United States	164.58	10	50.89	6	113.69
8	Akari Nakahara	United States	143.07	7	53.29	10	89.78
9	Brynne McIsaac	United States	141.61	9	51.20	9	90.41
10	Eliška Březinová	Czech Republic	139.77	8	51.82	11	87.95
11	Andrea Montesinos Cantu	Mexico	138.82	12	45.61	8	93.21
12	Isadora Williams	Brazil	135.92	11	48.10	12	87.84
13	Josefin Taljegard	Sweden	110.44	14	38.58	13	71.86
14	Katie Pasfield	Australia	105.23	13	39.52	14	65.71
15	Brooke Tamepo	New Zealand	82.42	15	27.48	15	54.94

=== Pairs ===
Rank	Name	Nation	Total	SP		FS	
1	Ashley Cain / Timothy LeDuc	United States	173.05	1	59.10	1	113.95
2	Audrey Lu / Misha Mitrofanov	United States	143.93	2	57.25	2	86.68
3	Ekaterina Alexandrovskaya / Harley Windsor	Australia	142.42	3	55.79	3	86.63
4	Winter Deardorff / Max Settlage	United States	128.91	5	45.07	4	83.84
5	Camille Ruest / Andrew Wolfe	Canada	124.17	4	53.66	5	70.51

=== Ice dancing ===
Rank	Name	Nation	Total	RD		FD	
1	Madison Hubbell / Zachary Donohue	United States	197.42	1	79.11	1	118.31
2	Christina Carreira / Anthony Ponomarenko	United States	174.04	2	68.61	2	105.43
3	Misato Komatsubara / Tim Koleto	Japan	142.93	4	53.42	3	89.51
4	Haley Sales / Nikolas Wamsteeker	Canada	142.48	3	54.11	4	88.37
5	Karina Manta / Joseph Johnson	United States	134.09	6	49.01	5	85.08
6	Emily Lauren Monaghan / Ilias Fourati	Hungary	126.27	5	49.54	6	76.73
7	Teodora Markova / Simon Daze	Bulgaria	115.59	7	47.45	7	68.14
WD	Marie-Jade Lauriault / Romain Le Gac	France	withdrew	withdrew from competition			
