= 2019 Skate America =

Figure skating competition

- Type: Grand Prix
- Date: October 18 – 20
- Season: 2019–20
- Location: Las Vegas, Nevada
- Host: U.S. Figure Skating
- Venue: Orleans Arena

Champions
- Men's singles: (United States) Nathan Chen
- Ladies' singles: (Russia) Anna Shcherbakova
- Pairs: (China) Peng Cheng / Jin Yang
- Ice dance: (United States) Madison Hubbell / Zachary Donohue
- Previous: 2018 Skate America
- Next: 2020 Skate America
- Next Grand Prix: 2019 Skate Canada International

The 2019 Skate America presented by American Cruise Lines was the first event in the 2019–20 ISU Grand Prix of Figure Skating, a senior-level international invitational competition series. It was held at Orleans Arena in Las Vegas, Nevada on October 18–20. Medals were awarded in the disciplines of men's singles, ladies' singles, pair skating, and ice dance. Skaters earned points toward qualifying for the 2019–20 Grand Prix Final.

Skate America was the first senior international event in International Skating Union history to be streamed live by the ISU on YouTube with geographical restrictions, as part of the federation's new deal for the 2019–20 Grand Prix series to reach countries that do not have broadcasting rights for any skating events.

== Entries ==
The ISU announced the preliminary assignments on June 20, 2019.

Country	Men	Ladies	Pairs	Ice dance
Australia			Ekaterina Alexandrovskaya / Harley Windsor	
Canada	Keegan Messing	Véronik Mallet	Camille Ruest / Andrew Wolfe	Laurence Fournier Beaudry / Nikolaj Sørensen
China	Jin Boyang		Peng Cheng / Jin Yang	Chen Hong / Sun Zhuoming
Czech Republic	Michal Březina			
France				Marie-Jade Lauriault / Romain Le Gac
Great Britain			Zoe Jones / Christopher Boyadji	
Hong Kong		Yi Christy Leung		
Israel	Alexei Bychenko			
Japan	Koshiro Shimada; Kazuki Tomono	Wakaba Higuchi; Kaori Sakamoto; Mako Yamashita		
Russia	Dmitri Aliev; Roman Savosin	Stanislava Konstantinova; Anna Shcherbakova; Elizaveta Tuktamysheva	Daria Pavliuchenko / Denis Khodykin	Sofia Shevchenko / Igor Eremenko; Alexandra Stepanova / Ivan Bukin; Tiffany Zahorski / Jonathan Guerreiro
South Korea	Cha Jun-hwan	Lim Eun-soo		
Spain				Olivia Smart / Adrián Díaz
United States	Jason Brown; Nathan Chen; Alexei Krasnozhon	Karen Chen; Amber Glenn; Bradie Tennell	Ashley Cain-Gribble / Timothy LeDuc; Jessica Calalang / Brian Johnson; Haven Denney / Brandon Frazier	Christina Carreira / Anthony Ponomarenko; Caroline Green / Michael Parsons; Madison Hubbell / Zachary Donohue

=== Changes to preliminary assignments ===
Discipline	Withdrew		Added		Notes	Ref.
Discipline	Date	Skater(s)	Date	Skater(s)	Notes	Ref.
Men	—N/a		September 10	(United States) Alexei Krasnozhon	Host picks	
Ladies	—N/a		September 10	(United States) Amber Glenn	Host picks	
Pairs	—N/a		September 10	(United States) Jessica Calalang / Brian Johnson	Host picks	
Ice dance	—N/a		September 10	(United States) Caroline Green / Michael Parsons	Host picks	
Pairs	October 1	(Russia) Natalia Zabiiako / Alexander Enbert	October 4	(United Kingdom) Zoe Jones / Christopher Boyadji	Health (Enbert)	
Men	October 3	(France) Romain Ponsart	October 5	(Israel) Alexei Bychenko		
Ladies	October 11	(Kazakhstan) Elizabet Tursynbaeva	October 14	(Hong Kong) Yi Christy Leung	Injury	

== Results ==
=== Men ===
Rank	Name	Nation	Total points	SP		FS	
1	Nathan Chen	United States	299.09	1	102.71	1	196.38
2	Jason Brown	United States	255.09	4	83.45	2	171.64
3	Dmitri Aliev	Russia	253.55	2	96.57	3	156.98
4	Keegan Messing	Canada	239.34	3	96.34	8	143.00
5	Kazuki Tomono	Japan	229.72	8	75.01	4	154.71
6	Jin Boyang	China	224.98	9	74.56	5	150.42
7	Alexei Bychenko	Israel	219.70	6	79.76	10	139.94
8	Cha Jun-hwan	South Korea	219.67	7	78.98	9	140.69
9	Alexei Krasnozhon	United States	216.59	10	72.30	6	144.29
10	Koshiro Shimada	Japan	216.03	11	72.12	7	143.91
11	Michal Březina	Czech Republic	213.17	5	81.11	11	132.06
12	Roman Savosin	Russia	182.16	12	57.92	12	124.24

=== Ladies ===
Russia's Anna Shcherbakova became the first woman to land two quad lutzes in the free skate.

Rank	Name	Nation	Total points	SP		FS	
1	Anna Shcherbakova	Russia	227.76	4	67.60	1	160.16
2	Bradie Tennell	United States	216.14	1	75.10	2	141.04
3	Elizaveta Tuktamysheva	Russia	205.97	5	67.28	3	138.69
4	Kaori Sakamoto	Japan	202.47	2	73.25	4	129.22
5	Lim Eun-soo	South Korea	184.50	8	63.96	5	120.54
6	Wakaba Higuchi	Japan	181.32	3	71.76	6	109.56
7	Amber Glenn	United States	169.63	7	64.71	9	104.92
8	Karen Chen	United States	165.67	6	66.03	10	99.64
9	Yi Christy Leung	Hong Kong	163.68	10	54.25	7	109.43
10	Véronik Mallet	Canada	161.75	9	56.69	8	105.06
11	Stanislava Konstantinova	Russia	143.39	11	48.27	12	95.12
12	Mako Yamashita	Japan	142.40	12	46.21	11	96.19

=== Pairs ===
Rank	Name	Nation	Total points	SP		FS	
1	Peng Cheng / Jin Yang	China	200.89	1	72.73	1	128.16
2	Daria Pavliuchenko / Denis Khodykin	Russia	196.98	2	71.25	3	125.73
3	Haven Denney / Brandon Frazier	United States	192.70	4	65.18	2	127.52
4	Jessica Calalang / Brian Johnson	United States	180.52	5	61.27	4	119.25
5	Ashley Cain-Gribble / Timothy LeDuc	United States	177.54	3	68.20	5	109.34
6	Camille Ruest / Andrew Wolfe	Canada	155.16	7	54.63	6	100.53
7	Ekaterina Alexandrovskaya / Harley Windsor	Australia	152.94	6	55.06	7	97.88
8	Zoe Jones / Christopher Boyadji	United Kingdom	138.79	8	47.92	8	90.87

=== Ice dance ===
The scores for the rhythm dance were initially calculated erroneously, omitting the Grade of Execution points for the man's half of the pattern step. Hours later, the scores were revised to reflect the proper point totals.

Rank	Name	Nation	Total points	RD		FD	
1	Madison Hubbell / Zachary Donohue	United States	209.55	1	84.97	2	124.58
2	Alexandra Stepanova / Ivan Bukin	Russia	206.57	2	81.91	1	124.66
3	Laurence Fournier Beaudry / Nikolaj Sørensen	Canada	197.53	3	79.17	3	118.36
4	Olivia Smart / Adrián Díaz	Spain	191.01	4	76.62	4	114.39
5	Tiffany Zahorski / Jonathan Guerreiro	Russia	181.82	5	71.18	5	110.64
6	Christina Carreira / Anthony Ponomarenko	United States	180.55	6	70.41	6	110.14
7	Caroline Green / Michael Parsons	United States	173.03	8	67.97	7	105.06
8	Marie-Jade Lauriault / Romain Le Gac	France	167.14	7	68.23	9	98.91
9	Sofia Shevchenko / Igor Eremenko	Russia	166.51	9	66.79	8	99.72
10	Chen Hong / Sun Zhuoming	China	159.94	10	61.74	10	98.20
