= Patinoire Polesud =

Ice rink in France

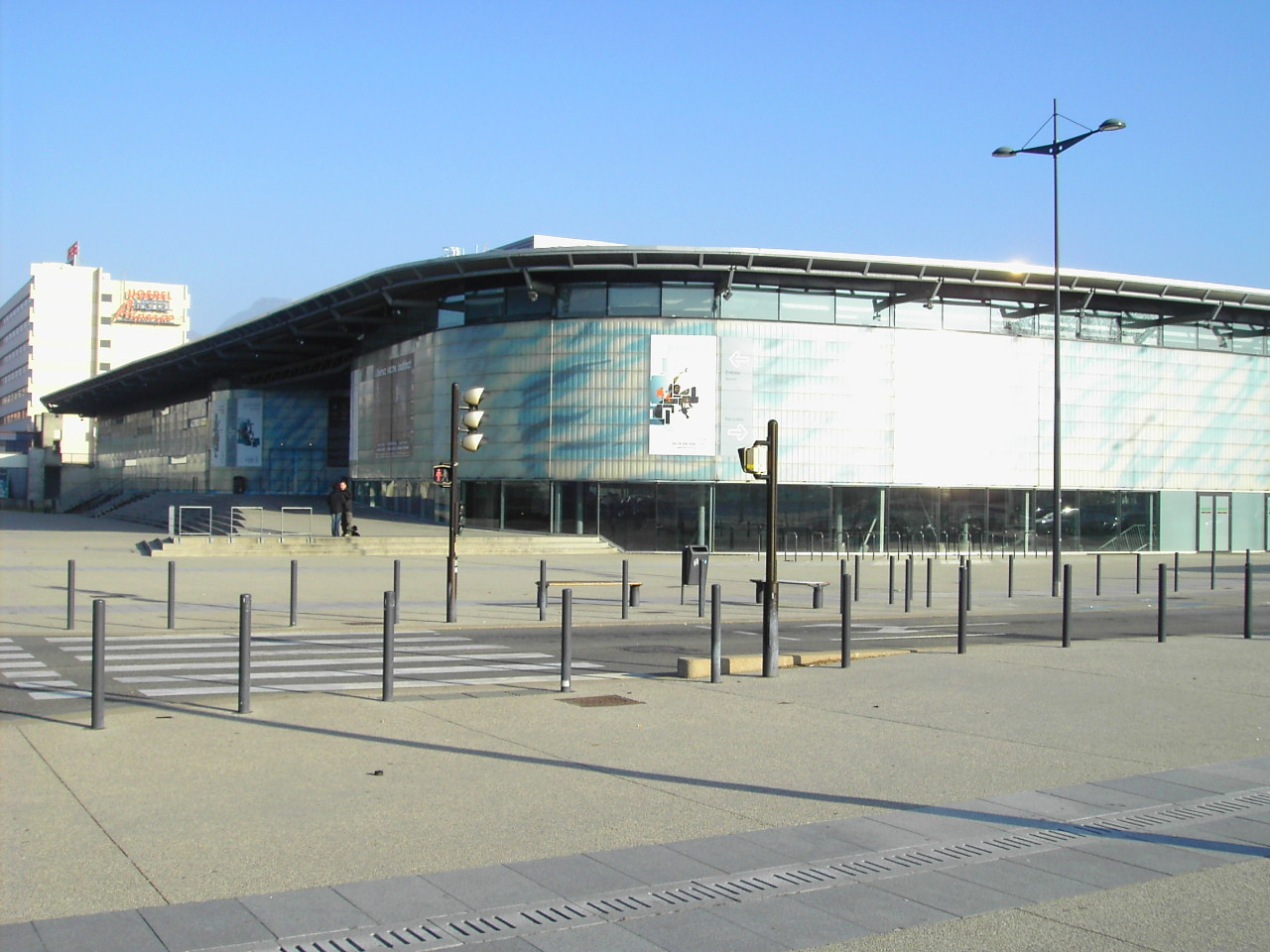
- Interactive map of Patinoire Polesud
- Location: Avenue d'Innsbruck; 38000 Grenoble, France
- Coordinates: 45°09′28″N 5°44′04″E
- Capacity: 4,208

Construction
- Opened: October 2001
- Architect: Herault Arnod Architectes

Tenant
- Brûleurs de Loups (2001-present)

Patinoire Polesud or Pôle Sud (English: "South Pole Ice Rink") is a 4,208-seat multi-purpose arena in Grenoble, France. It is the home of the city's ice hockey club, the Brûleurs de Loups (English: "Wolf Burners"), one of the best in France.

== Features ==
Patinoire Polesud features two ice rinks; the competition rink is 100 by 200 feet (30 by 61 metres). It is used for ice hockey, figure skating, and short track. There is a jumbotron and seating for 4,208 spectators around the competition rink, making it the largest arena in Ligue Magnus. The recreational rink is smaller, at 184 by 66 ft (56 by 20 m), and is open to the public.

In addition to skating related events, the Patinoire Polesud also features a 2-megawatt sound system and lighting, as well as a screen for retransmission of sporting events, movies, and concerts. Over two million spectators have come to see events since the arena opened in 2001.

== Events ==
- French Figure Skating Championships in December 2001
- Final of the Coupe de France 2003-2004 ice hockey in March 2004
- French Short Track Speed Skating Championships in April 2004
- 2017 Internationaux de France in November 2017
- 2018 Internationaux de France in November 2018
- 2019 Internationaux de France in November 2019
