= Camille Ruest =

Canadian pair skater

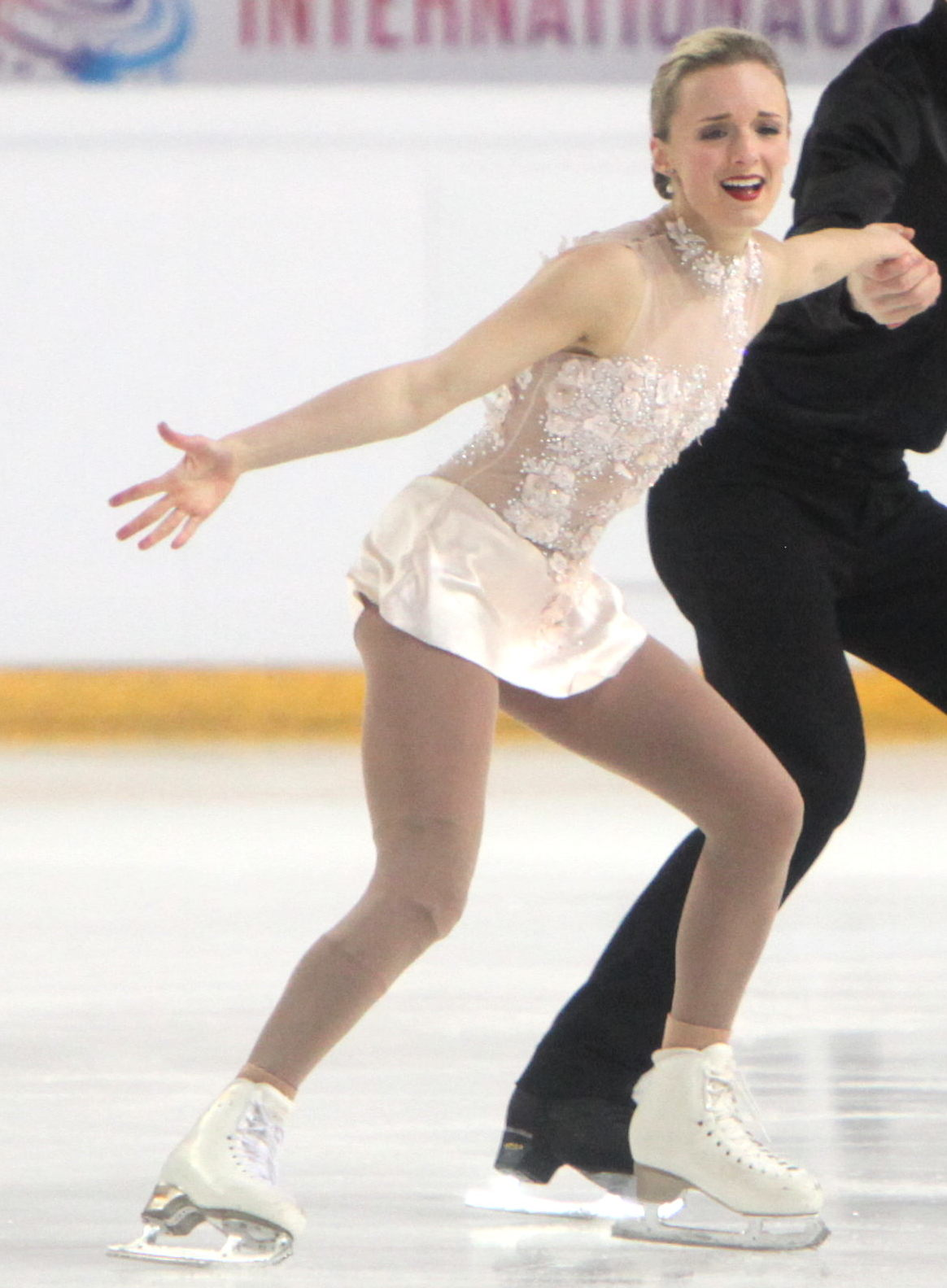
- Camille Ruest in the free skate of the 2018 Internationaux de France

Personal information
- Born: November 23, 1993 (age 32) Rimouski, Quebec, Canada
- Height: 1.55 m (5 ft 1 in)

Figure skating career
- Country: Canada
- Partner: Andrew Wolfe
- Coach: Richard Gauthier, Bruno Marcotte, Sylvie Fullum Annie Barabé, Sophie Richard
- Skating club: CPA Rimouski
- Began skating: 1997
- Retired: May 28, 2021

Camille Ruest (French pronunciation: [ʁy.ɛ]; born November 23, 1993) is a Canadian retired competitive pair skater. With her skating partner, Andrew Wolfe, she is the 2019 Canadian national bronze medallist, and has represented Canada at the Four Continents and World Championships, placing eighteenth at the 2018 World Championships in Milan.

== Personal life ==
Ruest was born on November 23, 1993, in Rimouski, Quebec. She is the daughter of Édith Lévesque and Claude Ruest. She studied Natural Sciences at Cégep de Sorel-Tracy, and Environmental Practice at Royal Roads University.

== Career ==
=== Single skating ===
Ruest began learning to skate in 1997. She competed mainly in ladies' singles until the end of the 2014–2015 season, placing 17th in the senior ranks at the 2014 Canadian Championships. She was coached by Annie Barabé and Sophie Richard in Contrecœur, Quebec.

=== Pair skating ===
Ruest trained in pair skating for two years beginning when she was 15 years old. She competed with Marc-Antoine Laporte in the pre-novice ranks in the 2009–2010 season. She spent the next few seasons focusing on singles.

Having decided to return to pairs, Ruest teamed up with Samuel Morais in April 2014. They placed 6th in the junior pairs' event at the 2015 Canadian Championships. The pair was coached by Annie Barabé in Contrecœur, Quebec. Ruest teamed up with Andrew Wolfe in September 2015. They trained but did not compete during their first season together.

==== 2016–17 season ====
Ruest and Wolfe debuted in international competition at the 2016 CS Autumn Classic International, where they placed fourth. They then made their Grand Prix debut, placing sixth at the 2016 Rostelecom Cup. Their season concluded at the 2017 Canadian Championships, where they placed fifth.

==== 2017–18 season ====
After beginning the season with a tenth-place finish at the 2017 CS Nebelhorn Trophy, Ruest and Wolfe did not compete on the Grand Prix. The finished sixth at the 2018 Canadian Championships. As the top three finishers were sent to the 2018 Winter Olympics, Ruest and Wolfe earned their first ISU Championship assignment, the 2018 Four Continents Championships in Taipei, where they finished seventh.

Following the retirement of Meagan Duhamel and Eric Radford, they were sent to the 2018 World Championships in Milan, where they finished eighteenth. They later credited the experience of competing at the World Championships as motivating them to keep improving.

==== 2018–19 season ====
Ruest and Wolfe began their season at the 2018 U.S. International Classic, where they finished fifth. Assigned to two Grand Prix events, they finished eighth at the 2018 Skate Canada International and fifth at the 2018 Internationaux de France.

At the 2019 Canadian Championships, they won the bronze medal, placing third in the short program and fourth in the free skate, despite an aborted lift. They were named to Canada's team for the 2019 Four Continents Championships. They finished eighth there.

==== 2019–20 season ====
Following the end of the 2018–19 season, Ruest underwent knee surgery. Returning to competition at the 2019 U.S. Classic, Ruest/Wolfe placed seventh. At their first Grand Prix assignment, 2019 Skate America, Ruest/Wolfe placed sixth. Shortly after the competition, Ruest was diagnosed with a new labral tear in her hip. They were sixth as well at the 2019 Internationaux de France.

==== 2020–21 season ====
Ruest/Wolfe were assigned to the 2020 Skate Canada International, but the event was cancelled as a result of the coronavirus pandemic.

On May 28, 2021, Ruest and Wolfe announced that they would be retiring from competitive skating, as Ruest's ongoing hip issues made continuing dangerous.

== Programs ==
With Wolfe

Season	Short program	Free skating	Exhibition
2020–2021	Let Me Down Easy by Max Frost choreo. by Julie Marcotte	Leave a Light On by Tom Walker	
2019–2020	Let Me Down Easy by Max Frost choreo. by Julie Marcotte	Turning Page by Sleeping at Last choreo. by Julie Marcotte	
2018–2019	Wild Horses (Unplugged) performed by Alicia Keys & Adam Levine choreo. by Julie Marcotte	Turning Page by Sleeping at Last choreo. by Julie Marcotte	
2017–2018	Oblivion by Astor Piazzolla performed by Marisa Lemcke choreo. by Julie Marcotte	Earth Song by Michael Jackson; Home by Armand Amar choreo. by Julie Marcotte	
2016–2017	Something performed by Jim Sturgess; Kinetic Love by Karl Hugo choreo. by Julie Marcotte	Earth Song by Michael Jackson; Home by Armand Amar choreo. by Julie Marcotte	Showdown by Black Eyed Peas

== Competitive highlights ==
GP: Grand Prix; CS: Challenger Series

=== Pairs with Wolfe ===
International
Event	16–17	17–18	18–19	19–20	20–21
Worlds		18th			
Four Continents		7th	8th		
GP France			5th	6th	
GP Rostelecom Cup	6th				
GP Skate America				6th	
GP Skate Canada			8th		C
CS Autumn Classic	4th				
CS Nebelhorn Trophy		10th			
CS U.S. Classic			5th	7th	
National
Canadian Champ.	5th	6th	3rd		
SC Challenge	3rd				
Section Québec		1st			
TBD = Assigned; C = Event Cancelled

=== Pairs with Morais ===
National
Event	2014–15
Canadian Championships	6th J
Skate Canada Challenge	7th J
Section Québec	1st J
J = Junior level

=== Ladies' singles ===
National
Event	09–10	10–11	11–12	12–13	13–14
Canadian Champ.		13th N		13th J	17th
Challenge, East	26th N	8th N	26th J	16th J	17th
Section Québec	4th N	6th N	5th J	3rd J	5th
Levels: N = Novice; J = Junior
