= 2018 Skate Canada International =

Figure skating competition

2018 Skate Canada
- Type: Grand Prix
- Date: October 26 – 28
- Season: 2018–19
- Location: Laval, Quebec
- Host: Skate Canada
- Venue: Place Bell

Champions
- Men's singles: (Japan) Shoma Uno
- Ladies' singles: (Russia) Elizaveta Tuktamysheva
- Pairs: (France) Vanessa James / Morgan Ciprès
- Ice dance: (United States) Madison Hubbell / Zachary Donohue
- Previous: 2017 Skate Canada International
- Next: 2019 Skate Canada International
- Previous Grand Prix: 2018 Skate America
- Next Grand Prix: 2018 Grand Prix of Helsinki

The 2018 Skate Canada International was the second event of the 2018–19 ISU Grand Prix of Figure Skating, a senior-level international invitational competition series. It was held at Place Bell in Laval, Quebec from October 26–28. Medals were awarded in the disciplines of men's singles, ladies' singles, pair skating, and ice dancing. Skaters earned points toward qualifying for the 2018–19 Grand Prix Final.

== Entries ==
The ISU published the preliminary assignments on June 29, 2018.

Country	Men	Ladies	Pairs	Ice dancing
Australia	Brendan Kerry		Ekaterina Alexandrovskaya / Harley Windsor	
Canada	Keegan Messing; Nam Nguyen; Roman Sadovsky	Alaine Chartrand; Alicia Pineault	Kirsten Moore-Towers / Michael Marinaro; Camille Ruest / Andrew Wolfe; Evelyn Walsh / Trennt Michaud	Piper Gilles / Paul Poirier; Haley Sales / Nikolas Wamsteeker; Carolane Soucisse / Shane Firus
China			Peng Cheng / Jin Yang	Wang Shiyue / Liu Xinyu
France	Kévin Aymoz		Vanessa James / Morgan Ciprès	Marie-Jade Lauriault / Romain Le Gac
Israel	Daniel Samohin			
Japan	Shoma Uno; Kazuki Tomono	Wakaba Higuchi; Yura Matsuda; Mako Yamashita		
Kazakhstan		Elizabet Tursynbaeva		
Russia	Alexander Samarin	Evgenia Medvedeva; Daria Panenkova; Elizaveta Tuktamysheva	Aleksandra Boikova / Dmitrii Kozlovskii	Anastasia Skoptcova / Kirill Aleshin; Victoria Sinitsina / Nikita Katsalapov
South Korea	Cha Jun-hwan			
Spain				Olivia Smart / Adrián Díaz
Sweden	Alexander Majorov			
United Kingdom				Robynne Tweedale / Joseph Buckland
United States	Jason Brown	Starr Andrews; Mariah Bell	Haven Denney / Brandon Frazier	Madison Hubbell / Zachary Donohue

=== Changes to preliminary assignments ===
Date	Discipline	Withdrew	Added	Reason/Other notes	Refs
September 11	Men	N/A	(Canada) Nam Nguyen	Host pick	
October 12	Ladies	(Canada) Larkyn Austman	(Canada) Véronik Mallet	Foot injury; host pick	
October 12	Ladies	(Canada) Gabrielle Daleman	(Canada) Alicia Pineault	Focus on health; host pick	
October 12 and 16	Ladies	(South Korea) Choi Da-bin	(United States) Starr Andrews	Boot issues	
October 25	Ladies	(Canada) Véronik Mallet	N/A	Foot injury	

== Records ==
The following new ISU best scores were set during this competition:

Event	Component	Skater(s)	Score	Date	Ref
Pairs	Short program	(France) Vanessa James / Morgan Ciprès	74.51	26 October 2018	
Ice dance	Rhythm dance	(United States) Madison Hubbell / Zachary Donohue	80.49	26 October 2018	
Pairs	Free skating	(France) Vanessa James / Morgan Ciprès	147.30	27 October 2018	
Pairs	Total score	(France) Vanessa James / Morgan Ciprès	221.81	27 October 2018	

== Results ==
=== Men ===
Rank	Name	Nation	Total points	SP		FS	
1	Shoma Uno	Japan	277.25	2	88.87	1	188.38
2	Keegan Messing	Canada	265.17	1	95.05	2	170.12
3	Cha Jun-hwan	South Korea	254.77	3	88.86	3	165.91
4	Alexander Samarin	Russia	248.78	4	88.06	4	160.72
5	Nam Nguyen	Canada	240.94	7	82.22	5	158.72
6	Jason Brown	United States	234.97	11	76.46	6	158.51
7	Kévin Aymoz	France	230.09	10	78.83	7	151.26
8	Daniel Samohin	Israel	225.89	5	84.90	9	140.99
9	Kazuki Tomono	Japan	220.83	8	81.63	10	139.20
10	Alexander Majorov	Sweden	220.30	6	84.64	12	135.66
11	Brendan Kerry	Australia	220.08	9	80.99	11	139.09
12	Roman Sadovsky	Canada	210.60	12	67.72	8	142.88

=== Ladies ===
Rank	Name	Nation	Total points	SP		FS	
1	Elizaveta Tuktamysheva	Russia	203.32	1	74.22	3	129.10
2	Mako Yamashita	Japan	203.06	3	66.30	2	136.76
3	Evgenia Medvedeva	Russia	197.91	7	60.83	1	137.08
4	Mariah Bell	United States	190.25	5	63.35	4	126.90
5	Elizabet Tursynbaeva	Kazakhstan	185.71	6	61.19	5	124.52
6	Wakaba Higuchi	Japan	181.29	2	66.51	7	114.78
7	Starr Andrews	United States	174.72	4	64.77	9	109.95
8	Alaine Chartrand	Canada	172.17	8	60.47	8	111.70
9	Daria Panenkova	Russia	168.54	11	51.41	6	117.13
10	Alicia Pineault	Canada	158.29	9	59.02	11	99.27
11	Yura Matsuda	Japan	157.59	10	53.35	10	104.24

=== Pairs ===
Rank	Name	Nation	Total points	SP		FS	
1	Vanessa James / Morgan Ciprès	France	221.81	1	74.51	1	147.30
2	Peng Cheng / Jin Yang	China	201.08	2	72.00	4	129.08
3	Kirsten Moore-Towers / Michael Marinaro	Canada	200.93	3	71.26	3	129.67
4	Aleksandra Boikova / Dmitrii Kozlovskii	Russia	196.54	4	64.57	2	131.97
5	Evelyn Walsh / Trennt Michaud	Canada	172.53	6	59.59	6	112.94
6	Haven Denney / Brandon Frazier	United States	170.22	8	55.31	5	114.91
7	Ekaterina Alexandrovskaya / Harley Windsor	Australia	166.95	5	60.77	7	106.18
8	Camille Ruest / Andrew Wolfe	Canada	162.16	7	57.53	8	104.63

=== Ice dancing ===
Rank	Name	Nation	Total points	RD		FD	
1	Madison Hubbell / Zachary Donohue	United States	200.76	1	80.49	2	120.27
2	Victoria Sinitsina / Nikita Katsalapov	Russia	195.17	2	74.66	1	120.51
3	Piper Gilles / Paul Poirier	Canada	186.97	6	66.95	3	120.02
4	Marie-Jade Lauriault / Romain Le Gac	France	180.32	4	68.90	4	111.42
5	Olivia Smart / Adrián Díaz	Spain	176.57	3	72.35	5	104.22
6	Wang Shiyue / Liu Xinyu	China	165.88	5	66.96	8	98.92
7	Robynne Tweedale / Joseph Buckland	United Kingdom	162.50	8	62.65	6	99.85
8	Carolane Soucisse / Shane Firus	Canada	156.74	9	57.10	7	99.64
9	Haley Sales / Nikolas Wamsteeker	Canada	150.23	10	57.09	9	93.14
10	Anastasia Skoptcova / Kirill Aleshin	Russia	147.99	7	62.68	10	85.31
