= Maral-Erdene Gansukh =

Mongolian figure skater (born 1996)

- Maral-Erdene at the 2021 Cup of Austria

Personal information
- Native name: Гансүхийн Марал-Эрдэнэ
- Born: May 25, 1996 (age 30) Ulaanbaatar, Mongolia
- Height: 166 cm (5 ft 5 in)

Figure skating career
- Country: Mongolia
- Discipline: Women's singles

Maral-Erdene Gansukh (Mongolian: Гансүхийн Марал-Эрдэнэ; born 25 May, 1996) is a Mongolian figure skater who competes in women's singles. She is the first Mongolian figure skater to compete at an International Skating Union championship.

== Early life ==
Maral-Erdene was born in Ulaanbaatar, Mongolia and moved to Nagoya, Japan when she was 5 years old due to her mother's work. She has a brother.

After seeing Mao Asada and other skaters perform on television, she began skating at age 9, then asked to join the competitive lesson track at age 11. Though told she was too old, she was eventually allowed to join.

== Career ==
Maral-Erdene originally competed at domestic Japanese competitions, but in 2011, her coach, Hiroshi Nagakubo, suggested she could compete for Mongolia. At the time, the Monoglian federation only had a speed skating division and had never sent a figure skater to competition, so Maral-Erdene was told to figure out the process herself.

In 2011, Maral-Erdene competed at the Asian Winter Games, her first major competition, where she placed 16th. That year, she also became the first Mongolian skater to appear at the World Junior Championships. She competed on the 2011–12 Junior Grand Prix circuit and at the 2012 World Junior Championships as well.

Once she began to represent Mongolia, she could no longer take Japanese figure skating tests and had difficulty entering domestic competitions. This made it hard for her to gain further competitive experience from which to grow, something she described as "very painful". With no funding, Maral-Erdene's family had to find ways to pay for competitions abroad themselves. During her first year of high school, under worsening mental stress, Maral-Erdene developed an eating disorder, which forced her to take a break from skating to recover.

In 2017, Maral-Erdene competed at the Finlandia Trophy. She traveled alone, without her coach or family, which she said was not easy, but said that, "I believe that as a pioneer I have to push the limits and be brave." Overall, she placed 25th.

Between 2018 and 2021, she performed in ice shows produced by her idol, Mao Asada, appearing in over 200 performances. Her fellow cast members encouraged her to continue competing, and with her pay from performing in the shows, she was able to travel to do so. She competed at the 2019 Winter Universiade, where she placed 30th, and the 2019 U.S. International Classic, where she placed 12th.

In January 2023, she appeared in the first ice show in Mongolia, "Grassland on Ice", which was one of several programs celebrating the 50th anniversary of Japan-Mongolia relations; it was held in cooperation with the Japan Skating Federation. Maral-Erdene performed an exhibition as a white-naped crane, a bird that migrates between Mongolia and Japan. She was asked to choreograph the program herself, and she considered her experience on Asada's tour to be the reason she was able to do so.

Maral-Erdene competed at the 2025 Asian Winter Games. She placed 18th overall, and she reflected that "Good things happened because I continued on," as she competed in the same group as her friend, Kaori Sakamoto, in the short program.

== Personal life ==
Maral-Erdene attended Chukyo University. As a doctoral student in the School of Health and Sports Science, she has studied skating jump mechanics. She has expressed a desire to both grow figure skating in Mongolia and advance her biomechanics career in Japan.

During her vacations, Maral-Erdene promotes figure skating and holds classes in Mongolia, where an indoor rink, AIC Steppe Arena, was opened in 2021. She sees figure skating as a way to promote cultural ties between Japan and Mongolia. She enjoys compulsory figures.

On 1 January, 2026, she announced she had married the previous month.
