= 2019 Internationaux de France =

Figure skating competition

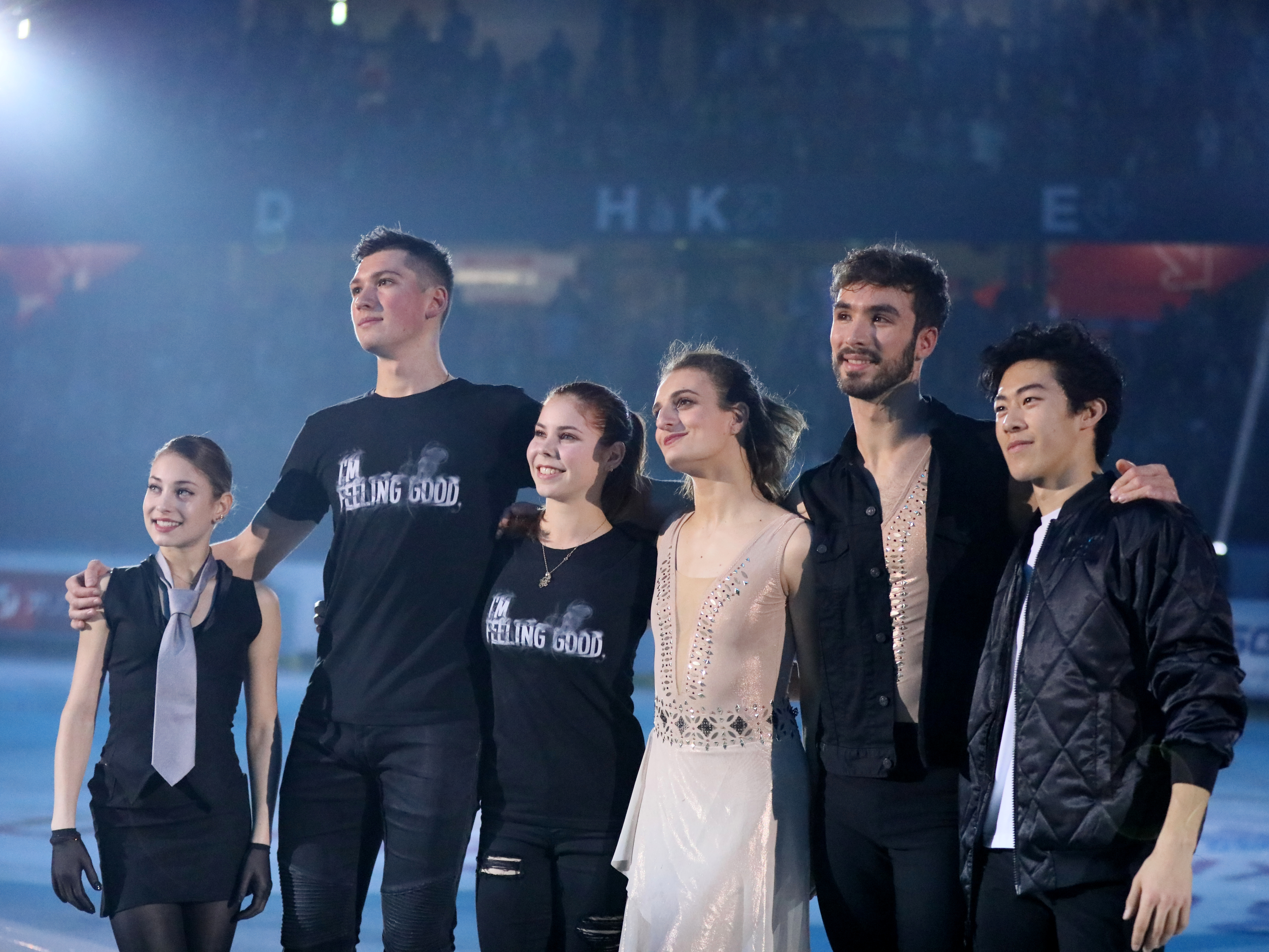
- 2019 Internationaux de France champions during the exhibition gala
- Type: Grand Prix
- Date: November 1 – 3
- Season: 2019–20
- Location: Grenoble
- Host: French Federation of Ice Sports
- Venue: Patinoire Polesud

Champions
- Men's singles: (United States) Nathan Chen
- Ladies' singles: (Russia) Alena Kostornaia
- Pairs: (Russia) Anastasia Mishina / Aleksandr Galliamov
- Ice dance: (France) Gabriella Papadakis / Guillaume Cizeron
- Previous: 2018 Internationaux de France
- Next: ~~2020 Internationaux de France~~; 2021 Internationaux de France
- Previous Grand Prix: 2019 Skate Canada International
- Next Grand Prix: 2019 Cup of China

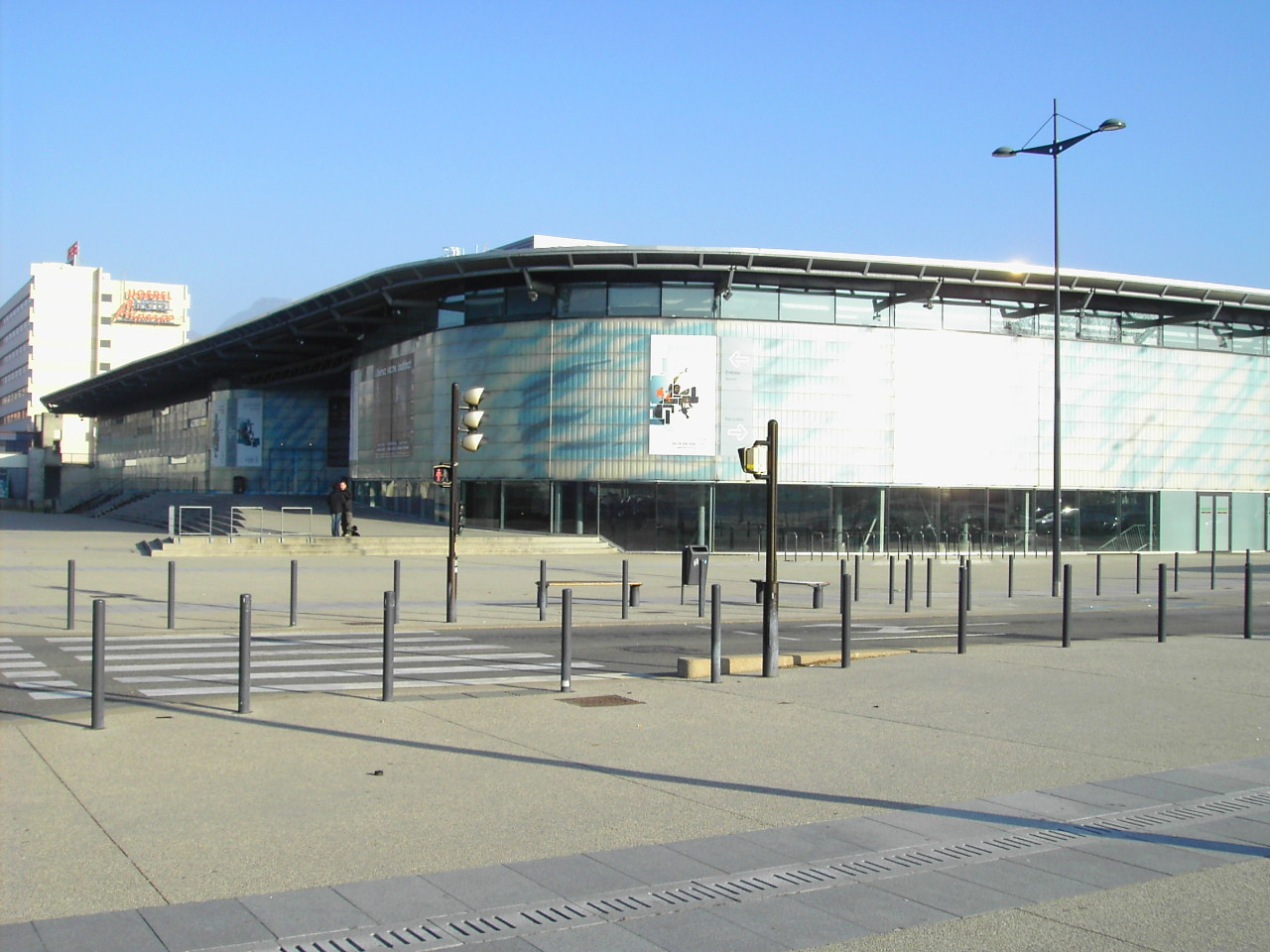
The venue, Patinoire Polesud, Grenoble

The 2019 Internationaux de France was the third event of the 2019–20 ISU Grand Prix of Figure Skating, a senior-level international invitational competition series. It was held at Patinoire Polesud in Grenoble, France from November 1–3. Medals were awarded in the disciplines of men's singles, ladies' singles, pair skating, and ice dance. Skaters earned points toward qualifying for the 2019–20 Grand Prix Final.

== Entries ==
The ISU announced the preliminary assignments on June 20, 2019.

Country	Men	Ladies	Pairs	Ice dance
Austria			Miriam Ziegler / Severin Kiefer	
Canada	Nicolas Nadeau		Camille Ruest / Andrew Wolfe	Carolane Soucisse / Shane Firus
France	Kévin Aymoz; Romain Ponsart	Laurine Lecavelier; Maé-Bérénice Méité; Léa Serna		Marie-Jade Lauriault / Romain Le Gac; Gabriella Papadakis / Guillaume Cizeron; Julia Wagret / Pierre Souquet
Georgia	Morisi Kvitelashvili			
Germany		Nicole Schott	Minerva Fabienne Hase / Nolan Seegert	
Israel	Daniel Samohin			
Italy			Rebecca Ghilardi / Filippo Ambrosini	Charlène Guignard / Marco Fabbri
Japan	Shoma Uno	Wakaba Higuchi; Kaori Sakamoto; Yuna Shiraiwa		
Lithuania				Allison Reed / Saulius Ambrulevičius
Poland				Natalia Kaliszek / Maksym Spodyriev
Russia	Alexander Samarin; Anton Shulepov; Sergei Voronov	Alena Kostornaia; Maria Sotskova; Alina Zagitova	Anastasia Mishina / Aleksandr Galliamov; Daria Pavliuchenko / Denis Khodykin	Tiffany Zahorski / Jonathan Guerreiro
Spain				Olivia Smart / Adrián Díaz
United States	Nathan Chen; Tomoki Hiwatashi	Starr Andrews; Mariah Bell	Ashley Cain-Gribble / Timothy LeDuc; Haven Denney / Brandon Frazier	Madison Chock / Evan Bates

=== Changes to preliminary assignments ===
Discipline	Withdrew		Added		Notes	Ref.
Discipline	Date	Skater(s)	Date	Skater(s)	Notes	Ref.
Pairs	September 13	(France) Vanessa James / Morgan Ciprès	September 16	(North Korea) Ryom Tae-ok / Kim Ju-sik	Personal reasons	
Men	—		September 13	(France) Adrien Tesson	Host picks	
Ladies	—		September 13	(France) Léa Serna	Host picks	
Ice dance	—		September 13	(France) Julia Wagret / Pierre Souquet	Host picks	
Pairs	September 27	(North Korea) Ryom Tae-ok / Kim Ju-sik	September 27	(Italy) Rebecca Ghilardi / Filippo Ambrosini		
Pairs	October 1	(Russia) Natalia Zabiiako / Alexander Enbert	October 7	(Canada) Camille Ruest / Andrew Wolfe	Health (Enbert)	
Ladies	October 9	(United States) Ting Cui	October 14	(United States) Starr Andrews	Injury	
Ice dance	October 10	(United States) Lorraine McNamara / Quinn Carpenter	October 11	(Lithuania) Allison Reed / Saulius Ambrulevičius	Injury	
Ladies	October 14	(Belgium) Loena Hendrickx	October 15	(Germany) Nicole Schott	Injury	
Men	October 28	(France) Adrien Tesson	—			

== Records ==
The following new ISU best scores were set during this competition:

Event	Component	Skater(s)	Score	Date	Ref
Ice dance	Rhythm dance	(France) Gabriella Papadakis / Guillaume Cizeron	88.69	November 1, 2019	

== Results ==
=== Men ===
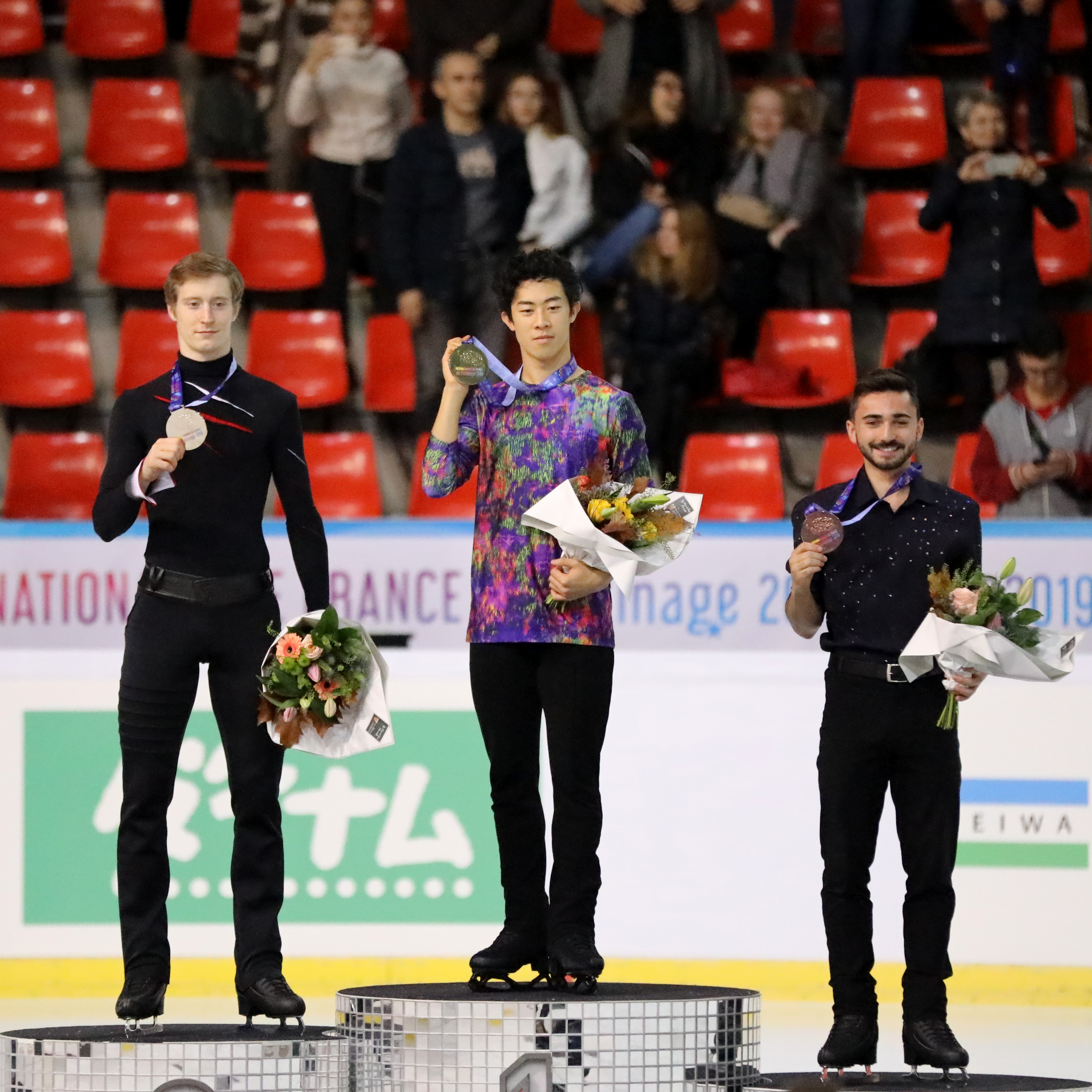
The podium for the men: Alexander Samarin (silver), Nathan Chen (gold) and Kévin Aymoz (bronze)

Rank	Name	Nation	Total points	SP		FS	
1	Nathan Chen	United States	297.16	1	102.48	1	194.68
2	Alexander Samarin	Russia	265.10	2	98.48	3	166.62
3	Kévin Aymoz	France	254.64	3	82.50	2	172.14
4	Morisi Kvitelashvili	Georgia	236.38	5	78.79	5	157.59
5	Tomoki Hiwatashi	United States	227.43	10	68.70	4	158.73
6	Sergei Voronov	Russia	220.98	7	76.60	7	144.38
7	Nicolas Nadeau	Canada	217.68	9	69.42	6	148.26
8	Shoma Uno	Japan	215.84	4	79.05	9	136.79
9	Romain Ponsart	France	215.64	6	77.48	8	138.16
10	Daniel Samohin	Israel	193.66	8	70.84	10	122.82
11	Anton Shulepov	Russia	183.98	11	63.67	11	120.31

=== Ladies ===
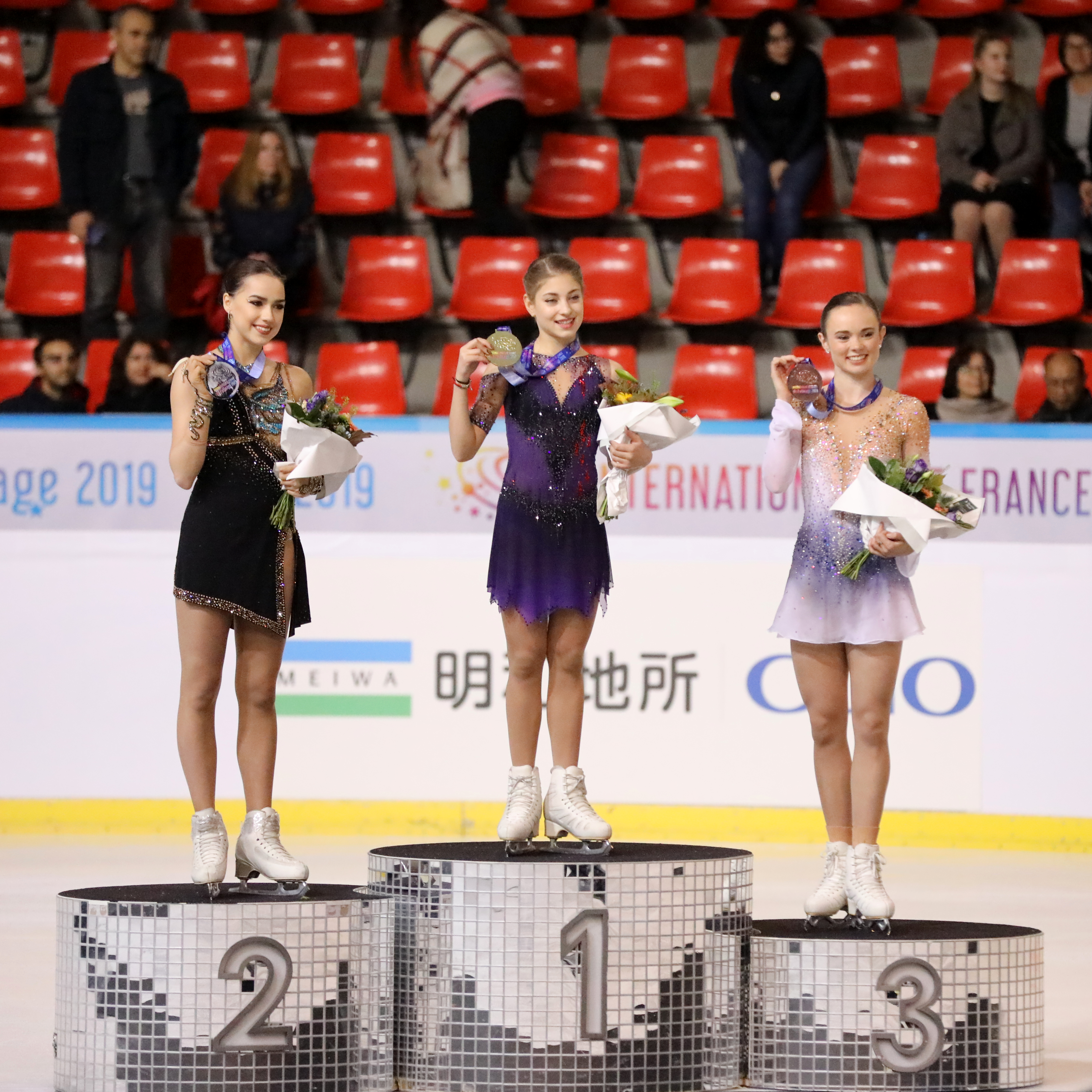
The podium for the ladies: Alina Zagitova (silver), Alena Kostornaia (gold), Mariah Bell (bronze)

Rank	Name	Nation	Total points	SP		FS	
1	Alena Kostornaia	Russia	236.00	1	76.55	1	159.45
2	Alina Zagitova	Russia	216.06	2	74.24	3	141.82
3	Mariah Bell	United States	212.89	3	70.25	2	142.64
4	Kaori Sakamoto	Japan	199.24	6	64.08	4	135.16
5	Starr Andrews	United States	180.54	4	66.59	5	113.95
6	Wakaba Higuchi	Japan	174.12	5	64.78	7	109.34
7	Nicole Schott	Germany	166.89	10	54.43	6	112.46
8	Léa Serna	France	166.02	8	62.43	8	103.59
9	Yuna Shiraiwa	Japan	161.71	7	63.12	10	98.59
10	Maé-Bérénice Méité	France	157.45	9	56.35	9	101.10
11	Maria Sotskova	Russia	144.89	11	50.38	11	94.51
WD	Laurine Lecavelier	France	withdrew	withdrew from competition			

=== Pairs ===
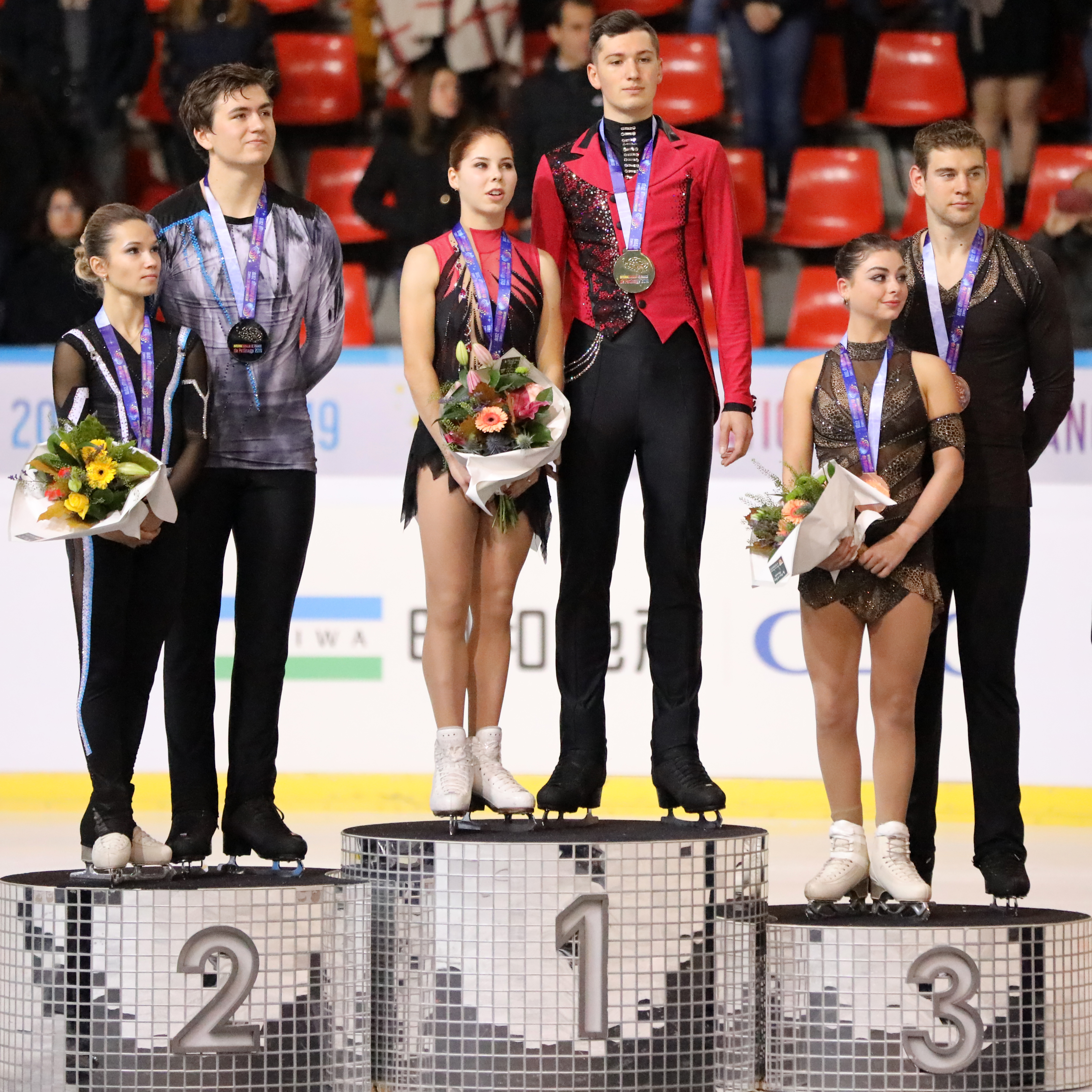
The pairs podium at the 2019 Internationaux de France

Rank	Name	Nation	Total points	SP		FS	
1	Anastasia Mishina / Aleksandr Galliamov	Russia	207.58	2	73.77	1	133.81
2	Daria Pavliuchenko / Denis Khodykin	Russia	206.56	1	76.59	3	129.97
3	Haven Denney / Brandon Frazier	United States	199.40	3	68.65	2	130.75
4	Ashley Cain-Gribble / Timothy LeDuc	United States	195.78	4	66.12	4	129.66
5	Miriam Ziegler / Severin Kiefer	Austria	181.26	8	57.30	5	123.96
6	Camille Ruest / Andrew Wolfe	Canada	166.15	7	57.90	6	108.25
7	Minerva Fabienne Hase / Nolan Seegert	Germany	163.09	6	59.13	7	103.96
8	Rebecca Ghilardi / Filippo Ambrosini	Italy	157.92	5	59.62	8	98.30

=== Ice dance ===
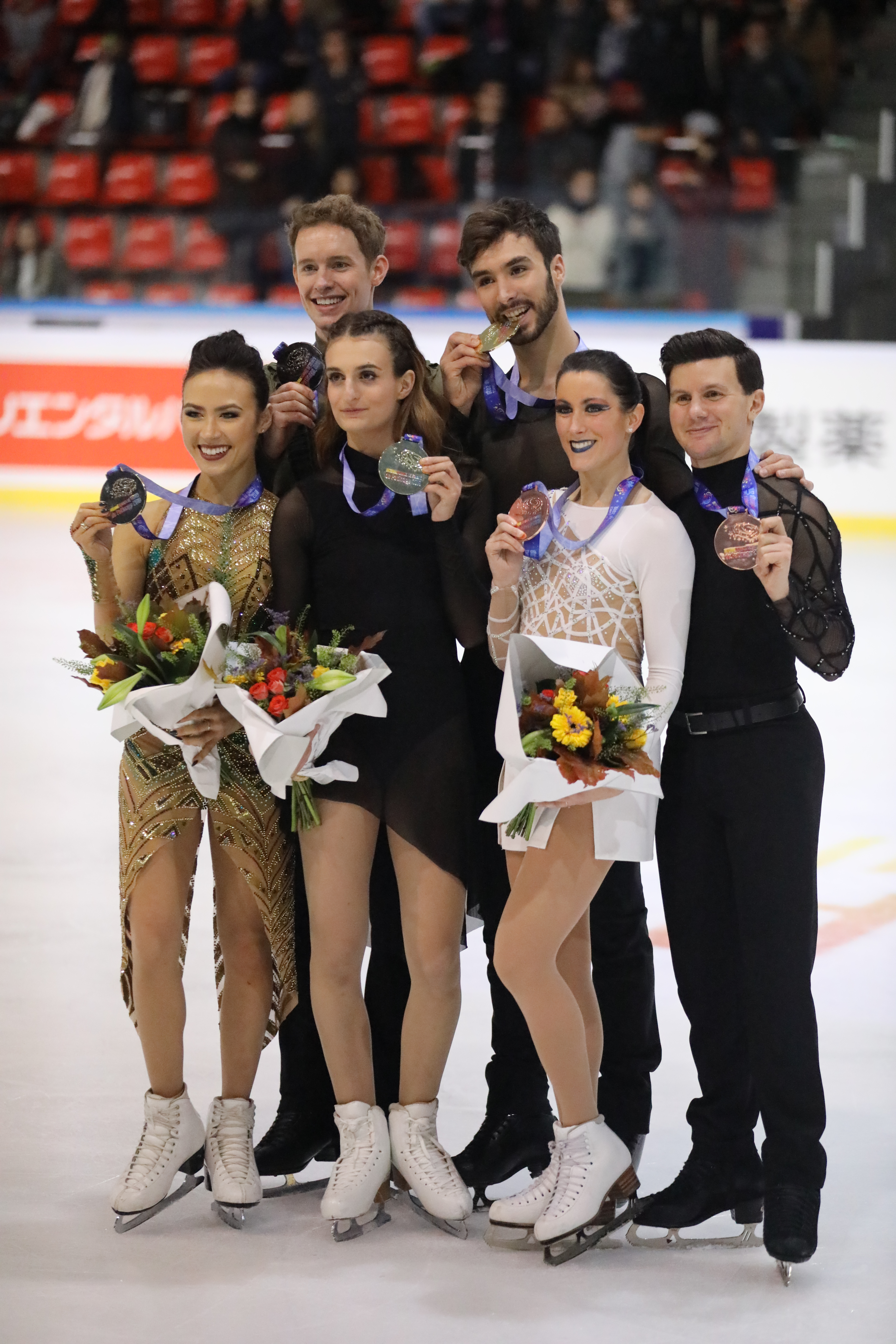
The ice dance medallists

The rhythm dance scores for the last two teams, Marie-Jade Lauriault / Romain Le Gac of France and Allison Reed / Saulius Ambrulevičius of Lithuania, were revised several hours after the event due to an unspecified error.

Rank	Name	Nation	Total points	RD		FD	
1	Gabriella Papadakis / Guillaume Cizeron	France	222.24	1	88.69	1	133.55
2	Madison Chock / Evan Bates	United States	204.84	2	80.69	2	124.15
3	Charlène Guignard / Marco Fabbri	Italy	203.34	3	79.65	3	123.69
4	Olivia Smart / Adrián Díaz	Spain	188.18	4	76.09	4	112.09
5	Tiffany Zahorski / Jonathan Guerreiro	Russia	184.44	5	75.05	5	109.39
6	Natalia Kaliszek / Maksym Spodyriev	Poland	183.42	6	74.19	6	109.23
7	Carolane Soucisse / Shane Firus	Canada	175.80	7	68.61	7	107.19
8	Marie-Jade Lauriault / Romain Le Gac	France	166.28	9	63.42	8	102.86
9	Julia Wagret / Pierre Souquet	France	161.99	8	63.55	10	98.44
10	Allison Reed / Saulius Ambrulevičius	Lithuania	161.73	10	60.99	9	100.74
