= 2019 CS U.S. International Figure Skating Classic =

2019 CS U.S. International Classic
- Type: ISU Challenger Series
- Date: September 17 – 22
- Season: 2019–20
- Location: Salt Lake City, Utah, United States
- Host: U.S. Figure Skating
- Venue: Salt Lake City Sports Complex

Champions
- Men's singles: (Japan) Keiji Tanaka
- Ladies' singles: (Japan) Satoko Miyahara
- Pairs: (United States) Ashley Cain-Gribble / Timothy LeDuc
- Ice dance: (United States) Madison Chock / Evan Bates
- Previous: 2019 CS Lombardia Trophy
- Next: 2019 CS Nepela Memorial

The 2019 CS U.S. International Figure Skating Classic was held in September 2019 in Salt Lake City, Utah. It was part of the 2019–20 ISU Challenger Series. Medals were awarded in the disciplines of men's singles, ladies' singles, pair skating, and ice dance.

== Entries ==
The International Skating Union published the list of entries on August 20, 2019.

Country	Men	Ladies	Pairs	Ice dance
Canada		Hannah Dawson; Alicia Pineault	Lori-Ann Matte / Thierry Ferland; Camille Ruest / Andrew Wolfe; Nadine Wang / Francis Boudreau-Audet	Molly Lanaghan / Dmitre Razgulajevs; Carolane Soucisse / Shane Firus
China			Peng Cheng / Jin Yang	
Chinese Taipei	Micah Tang	Jenny Shyu		
Czech Republic		Eliška Březinová		
France				Julia Wagret / Pierre Souquet
Hong Kong		Hiu Ching Kwong		
Hungary				Emily Monaghan / Ilias Fourati
Israel		Taylor Morris		
Japan	Keiji Tanaka; Sōta Yamamoto	Satoko Miyahara; Yuna Shiraiwa		
Kazakhstan				Maxine Weatherby / Temirlan Yerzhanov
Mexico		Andrea Montesinos Cantú		
Mongolia		Maral-Erdene Gansukh		
Philippines	Yamato Rowe			
Poland				Justyna Plutowska / Jérémie Flemin
Russia			Evgenia Tarasova / Vladimir Morozov	
South Korea		You Young		
Thailand	Micah Kai Lynette			
Turkey				Nicole Kelly / Berk Akalın
United States	Tomoki Hiwatashi; Alexei Krasnozhon; Jimmy Ma; Vincent Zhou	Ting Cui; Amber Glenn	Ashley Cain-Gribble / Timothy LeDuc; Jessica Calalang / Brian Johnson; Tarah Kayne / Danny O'Shea; Audrey Lu / Misha Mitrofanov	Christina Carreira / Anthony Ponomarenko; Madison Chock / Evan Bates

=== Changes to preliminary assignments ===
Date	Discipline	Withdrew	Added	Reason/Other notes	Refs
September 9	Ladies	(United States) Hanna Harrell		Injury	
September 10	Men	(Canada) Nicolas Nadeau			
September 10	Ladies	(Armenia) Anastasia Galustyan			
September 11	Ice dance	(Ukraine) Yuliia Zhata / Yan Lukouski			

== Results ==
=== Men ===
Rank	Name	Nation	Total points	SP		FS	
1	Keiji Tanaka	Japan	249.96	2	88.76	1	161.20
2	Sōta Yamamoto	Japan	240.11	3	82.88	2	157.23
3	Vincent Zhou	United States	231.95	1	89.03	4	142.92
4	Alexei Krasnozhon	United States	230.11	5	76.92	3	153.19
5	Tomoki Hiwatashi	United States	214.82	4	76.96	5	137.86
6	Jimmy Ma	United States	200.30	6	67.34	6	132.96
7	Micah Kai Lynette	Thailand	177.83	7	63.89	7	113.94
8	Micah Tang	Chinese Taipei	130.42	8	46.42	8	84.00
9	Yamato Rowe	Philippines	117.23	9	42.86	9	74.37

=== Ladies ===
Rank	Name	Nation	Total points	SP		FS	
1	Satoko Miyahara	Japan	204.30	1	74.16	2	130.14
2	You Young	South Korea	199.29	4	58.04	1	141.25
3	Amber Glenn	United States	186.28	2	66.09	3	120.19
4	Ting Cui	United States	177.47	3	63.10	4	114.37
5	Andrea Montesinos Cantú	Mexico	140.59	8	49.54	5	91.05
6	Hannah Dawson	Canada	138.50	5	52.77	7	85.73
7	Alicia Pineault	Canada	138.29	7	49.58	6	88.71
8	Taylor Morris	Israel	133.95	6	49.87	8	84.08
9	Jenny Shyu	Chinese Taipei	123.81	9	43.13	9	80.68
10	Hiu Ching Kwong	Hong Kong	117.20	10	41.71	10	75.49
11	Eliška Březinová	Czech Republic	114.84	11	39.36	11	75.48
12	Maral-Erdene Gansukh	Mongolia	68.33	12	22.37	12	45.96
WD	Yuna Shiraiwa	Japan	withdrew	withdrew from competition			

=== Pairs ===
Rank	Name	Nation	Total points	SP		FS	
1	Ashley Cain-Gribble / Timothy LeDuc	United States	205.58	1	76.23	1	129.35
2	Evgenia Tarasova / Vladimir Morozov	Russia	194.69	2	74.85	2	119.84
3	Peng Cheng / Jin Yang	China	184.04	3	67.90	3	116.14
4	Tarah Kayne / Danny O'Shea	United States	174.02	4	64.90	4	109.12
5	Audrey Lu / Misha Mitrofanov	United States	168.50	5	63.87	5	104.63
6	Jessica Calalang / Brian Johnson	United States	166.50	7	62.11	6	104.39
7	Camille Ruest / Andrew Wolfe	Canada	160.54	6	62.75	7	97.79
8	Lori-Ann Matte / Thierry Ferland	Canada	152.05	8	60.02	9	92.03
9	Nadine Wang / Francis Boudreau-Audet	Canada	151.95	9	56.32	8	95.63

=== Ice dance ===
Rank	Name	Nation	Total points	RD		FD	
1	Madison Chock / Evan Bates	United States	202.40	1	80.18	1	122.22
2	Christina Carreira / Anthony Ponomarenko	United States	188.47	2	77.18	2	111.29
3	Carolane Soucisse / Shane Firus	Canada	181.39	3	71.33	3	110.06
4	Molly Lanaghan / Dmitre Razgulajevs	Canada	154.13	4	58.26	4	95.87
5	Julia Wagret / Pierre Souquet	France	148.90	5	56.26	5	92.64
6	Justyna Plutowska / Jérémie Flemin	Poland	139.84	7	52.18	6	87.66
7	Emily Monaghan / Ilias Fourati	Hungary	136.04	6	52.95	7	83.09
8	Maxine Weatherby / Temirlan Yerzhanov	Kazakhstan	125.25	9	46.93	8	78.32
9	Nicole Kelly / Berk Akalın	Turkey	118.35	8	47.73	9	70.62
