= 2018 Internationaux de France =

Figure skating competition

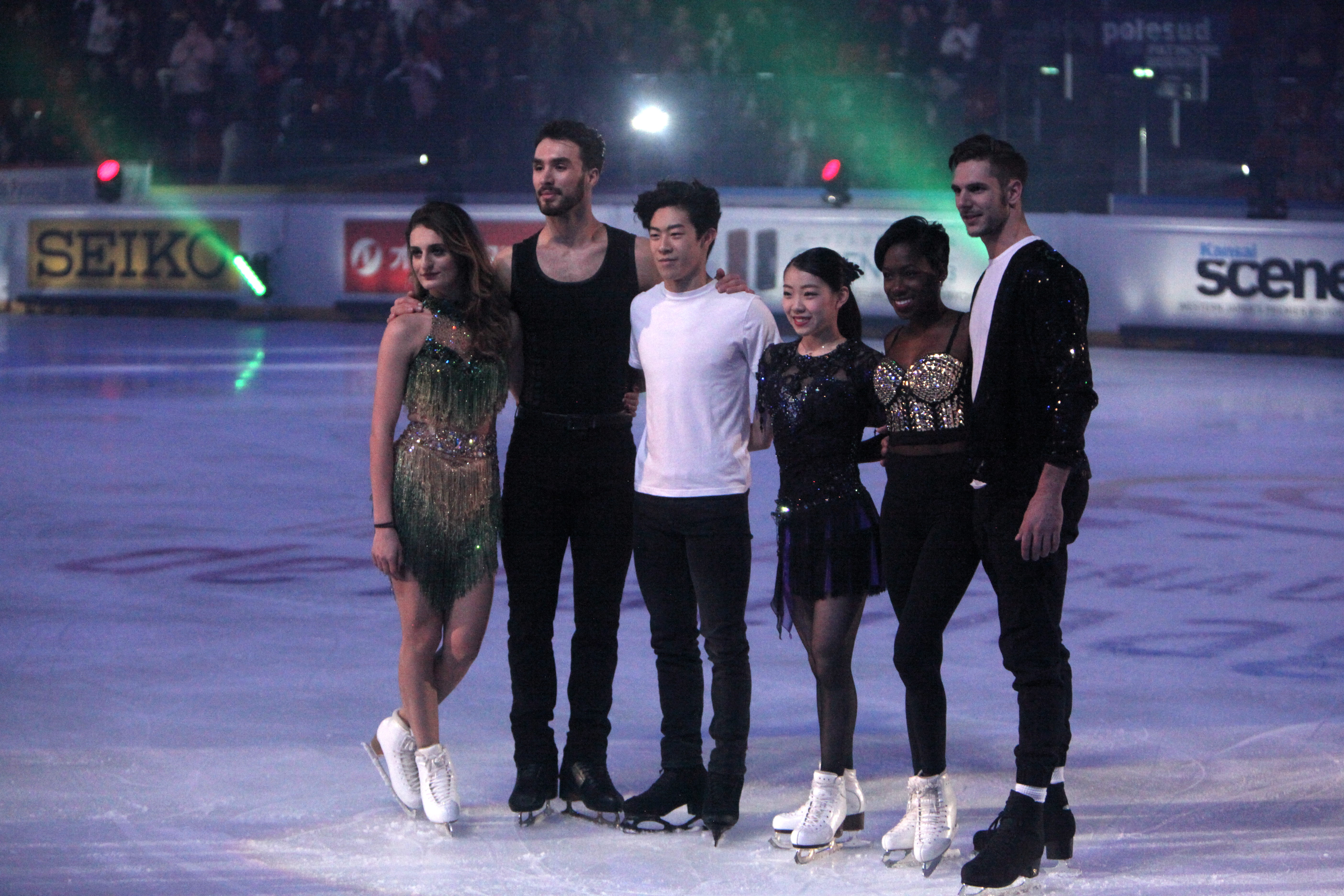
- Type: Grand Prix
- Date: November 23 – 25
- Season: 2018–19
- Location: Grenoble
- Host: French Federation of Ice Sports
- Venue: Patinoire Polesud

Champions
- Men's singles: (United States) Nathan Chen
- Ladies' singles: (Japan) Rika Kihira
- Pairs: (France) Vanessa James / Morgan Ciprès
- Ice dance: (France) Gabriella Papadakis / Guillaume Cizeron
- Previous: 2017 Internationaux de France
- Next: 2019 Internationaux de France
- Previous Grand Prix: 2018 Rostelecom Cup
- Next Grand Prix: 2018–19 Grand Prix Final

The 2018 Internationaux de France was the sixth event of six in the 2018–19 ISU Grand Prix of Figure Skating, a senior-level international invitational competition series. It was held at Patinoire Polesud in Grenoble on November 23–25. Medals were awarded in the disciplines of men's singles, ladies' singles, pair skating, and ice dancing. Skaters also earned points toward qualifying for the 2018–19 Grand Prix Final.

== Entries ==
The ISU published the preliminary assignments on June 29, 2018.

Country	Men	Ladies	Pairs	Ice dance
Canada	Nicolas Nadeau		Camille Ruest / Andrew Wolfe	Piper Gilles / Paul Poirier
China	Jin Boyang			
North Korea			Ryom Tae-ok / Kim Ju-sik	
France	Kévin Aymoz; Romain Ponsart	Laurine Lecavelier; Maé-Bérénice Méité; Léa Serna	Vanessa James / Morgan Ciprès	Adelina Galyavieva / Louis Thauron; Marie-Jade Lauriault / Romain Le Gac; Gabriella Papadakis / Guillaume Cizeron
Germany			Minerva Fabienne Hase / Nolan Seegert	
Israel	Daniel Samohin			
Japan	Keiji Tanaka	Marin Honda; Rika Kihira; Mai Mihara		
Latvia	Deniss Vasiļjevs			
Lithuania				Allison Reed / Saulius Ambrulevičius
Russia	Dmitri Aliev; Alexander Samarin	Stanislava Konstantinova; Evgenia Medvedeva; Maria Sotskova	Aleksandra Boikova / Dmitrii Kozlovskii	Betina Popova / Sergey Mozgov; Victoria Sinitsina / Nikita Katsalapov
Spain				Olivia Smart / Adrián Díaz
Sweden		Matilda Algotsson		
Switzerland		Alexia Paganini		
United States	Jason Brown; Nathan Chen	Bradie Tennell	Tarah Kayne / Danny O'Shea; Audrey Lu / Misha Mitrofanov	Kaitlin Hawayek / Jean-Luc Baker; Rachel Parsons / Michael Parsons

=== Changes to preliminary assignments ===
Date	Discipline	Withdrew	Added	Reason/Other notes	Refs
July 9 and 31	Pairs	(China) Yu Xiaoyu / Zhang Hao	(Germany) Minerva Fabienne Hase / Nolan Seegert	Foot injury (Yu)	
July 19 and August 2	Pairs	(Canada) Julianne Séguin / Charlie Bilodeau	(Canada) Camille Ruest / Andrew Wolfe	Split	
July 27 and September 28	Pairs	(France) Lola Esbrat / Andrei Novoselov	(United States) Audrey Lu / Misha Mitrofanov	Split; host pick	
September 14	Men	N/A	(France) Kévin Aymoz	Host pick	
September 14	Ladies	N/A	(France) Léa Serna	Host pick	
September 14	Ice dance	N/A	(France) Adelina Galayavieva / Louis Thauron	Host pick	
October 20 and 24	Ladies	(Italy) Carolina Kostner	(Switzerland) Alexia Paganini	Hip injury	
November 14	Pairs	(United States) Haven Denney / Brandon Frazier	N/A		
November 15	Men	(France) Chafik Besseghier	N/A		

== Records ==
The following new ISU best scores were set during this competition:

Event	Component	Skater(s)	Score	Date	Ref
Ice dance	Rhythm dance	(France) Gabriella Papadakis / Guillaume Cizeron	84.13	23 November 2018	
Ice dance	Free dance	(France) Gabriella Papadakis / Guillaume Cizeron	132.65	24 November 2018	
Ice dance	Total score	(France) Gabriella Papadakis / Guillaume Cizeron	216.78	24 November 2018	

== Results ==
=== Men ===
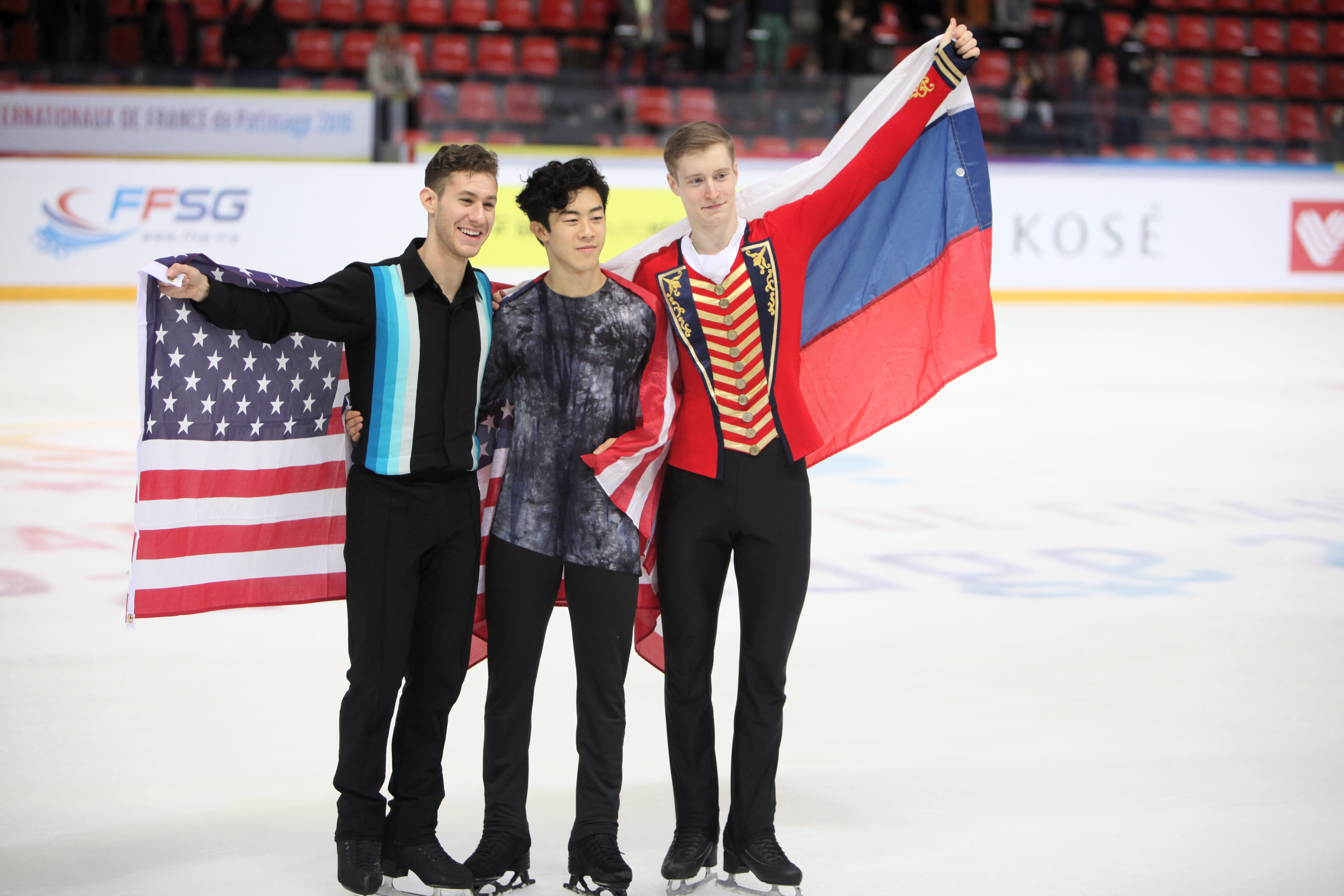
The three men medallists with their flags

Rank	Name	Nation	Total points	SP		FS	
1	Nathan Chen	United States	271.58	3	86.94	1	184.64
2	Jason Brown	United States	256.33	1	96.41	3	159.92
3	Alexander Samarin	Russia	247.09	2	90.86	4	156.23
4	Dmitri Aliev	Russia	237.82	9	75.15	2	162.67
5	Kevin Aymoz	France	231.16	6	81.00	5	150.16
6	Romain Ponsart	France	229.86	4	84.97	6	144.89
7	Deniss Vasiljevs	Latvia	221.26	5	82.30	7	138.96
8	Keiji Tanaka	Japan	216.32	8	79.35	8	136.97
9	Boyang Jin	China	208.89	7	79.41	10	129.48
10	Daniel Samohin	Israel	205.99	10	72.33	9	133.66
WD	Nicolas Nadeau	Canada	withdrew	11	61.46	withdrew from competition	

=== Ladies ===
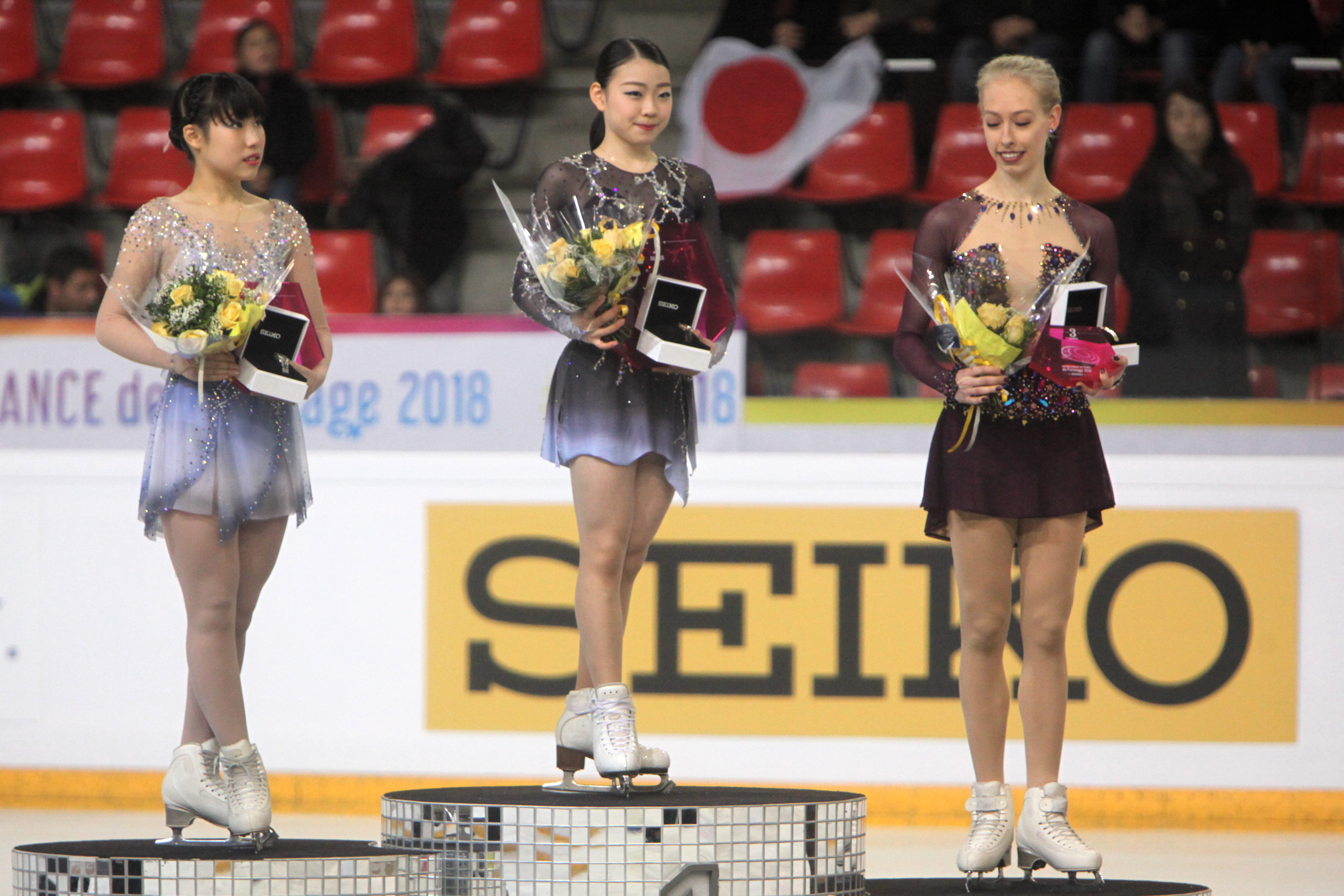
The ladies' podium

Rank	Name	Nation	Total points	SP		FS	
1	Rika Kihira	Japan	205.92	2	67.65	1	138.28
2	Mai Mihara	Japan	202.81	1	67.95	3	134.86
3	Bradie Tennell	United States	197.78	6	61.34	2	136.44
4	Evgenia Medvedeva	Russia	192.81	3	67.55	5	125.26
5	Stanislava Konstantinova	Russia	189.67	10	54.91	4	134.76
6	Marin Honda	Japan	188.61	4	65.37	6	123.24
7	Maria Sotskova	Russia	177.59	5	61.76	7	115.83
8	Maé Bérénice Méité	France	168.02	7	60.86	8	107.16
9	Laurine Lecavelier	France	157.24	11	51.66	9	105.58
10	Alexia Paganini	Switzerland	156.51	8	56.88	10	99.63
11	Léa Serna	France	149.49	9	55.31	12	94.18
12	Matilda Algotsson	Sweden	146.35	12	48.58	11	97.77

=== Pairs ===
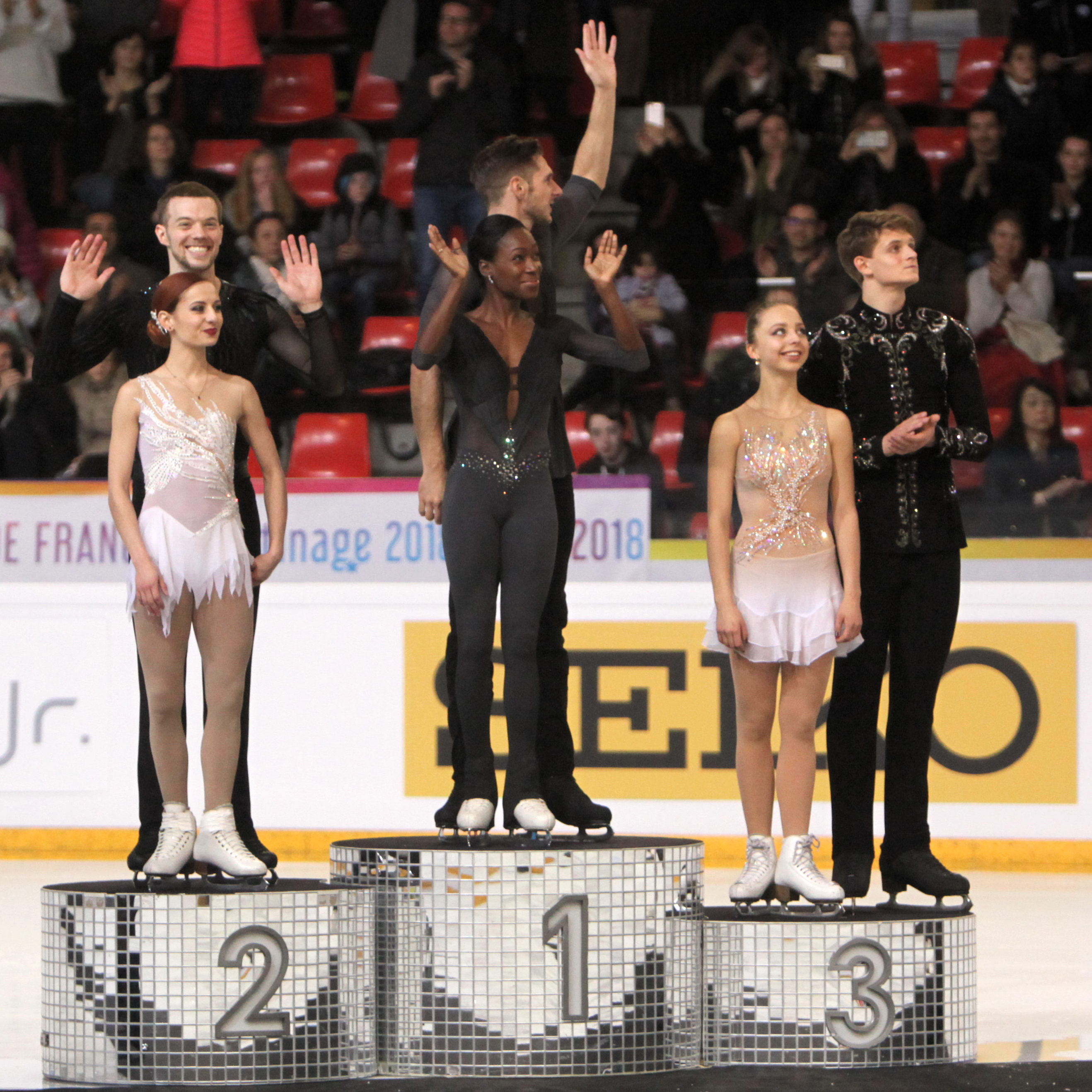
Pairs podium

Rank	Name	Nation	Total points	SP		FS	
1	Vanessa James / Morgan Ciprès	France	205.77	3	65.24	1	140.53
2	Tarah Kayne / Danny O'Shea	United States	191.43	4	63.45	2	127.98
3	Aleksandra Boikova / Dimitrii Kozlovskii	Russia	189.84	1	68.83	3	121.01
4	Ryom Tae-ok / Kim Ju-sik	North Korea	187.95	2	67.18	4	120.77
5	Camille Ruest / Andrew Wolfe	Canada	164.10	5	58.25	5	105.85
6	Audrey Lu / Misha Mitrofanov	United States	157.28	6	56.71	7	100.57
7	Minerva Fabienne Hase / Nolan Seegert	Germany	154.77	7	52.61	6	102.16

=== Ice dance ===
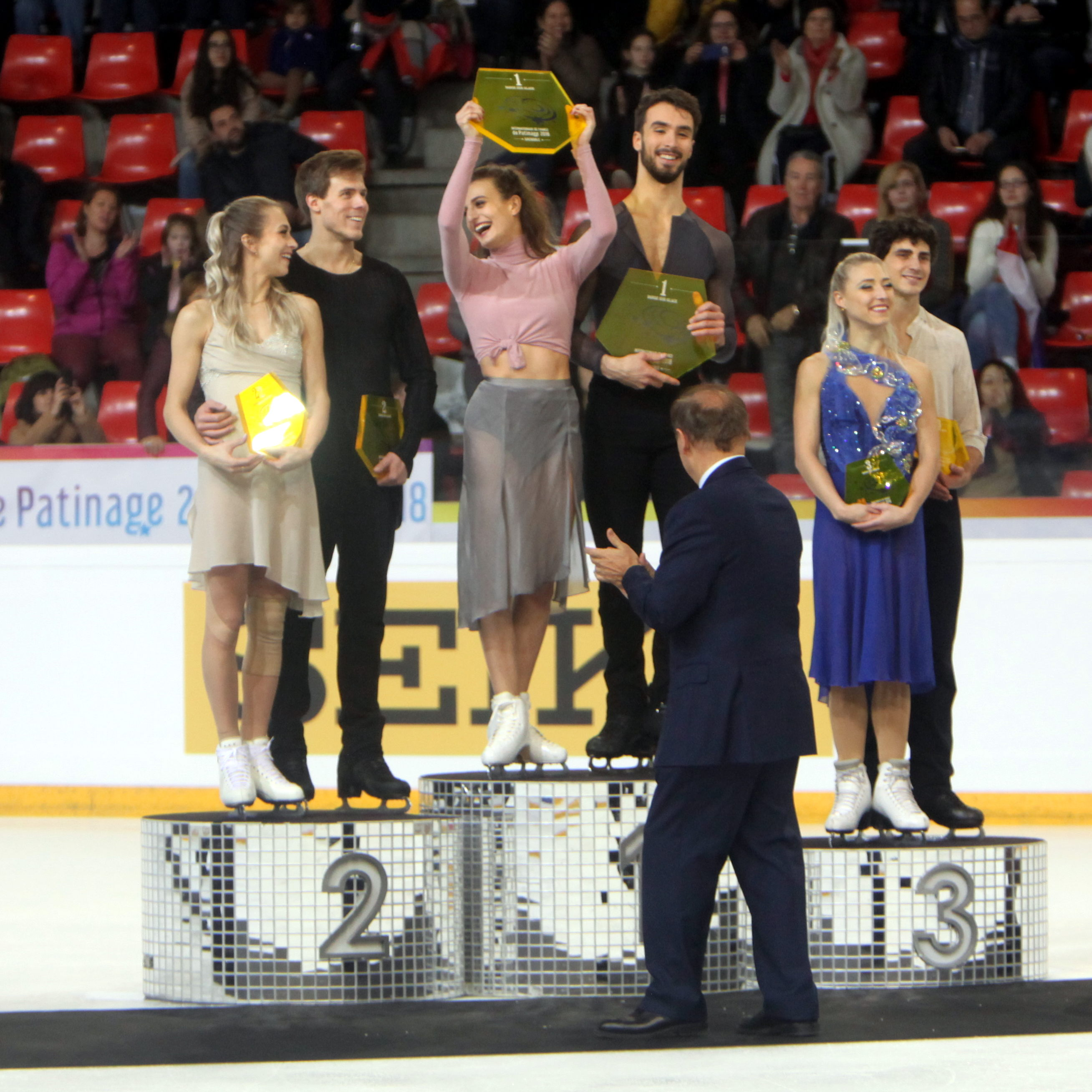
Ice dance podium

Rank	Name	Nation	Total points	RD		FD	
1	Gabriella Papadakis / Guillaume Cizeron	France	216.78	1	84.13	1	132.65
2	Victoria Sinitsina / Nikita Katsalapov	Russia	200.38	2	77.91	2	122.47
3	Piper Gilles / Paul Poirier	Canada	188.74	3	74.25	3	114.49
4	Kaitlin Hawayek / Jean-Luc Baker	United States	181.47	4	69.85	4	111.62
5	Rachel Parsons / Michael Parsons	United States	171.17	6	68.14	6	103.03
6	Marie-Jade Lauriault / Romain Le Gac	France	170.64	7	64.94	5	105.70
7	Olivia Smart / Adrián Díaz	Spain	165.69	5	68.16	8	97.53
8	Betina Popova / Sergey Mozgov	Russia	163.18	8	63.64	7	99.54
9	Allison Reed / Saulius Ambrulevičius	Lithuania	153.27	9	59.77	9	93.50
10	Adelina Galyavieva / Louis Thauron	France	146.05	10	55.21	10	90.84
