= Andrew Wolfe =

Canadian figure skater

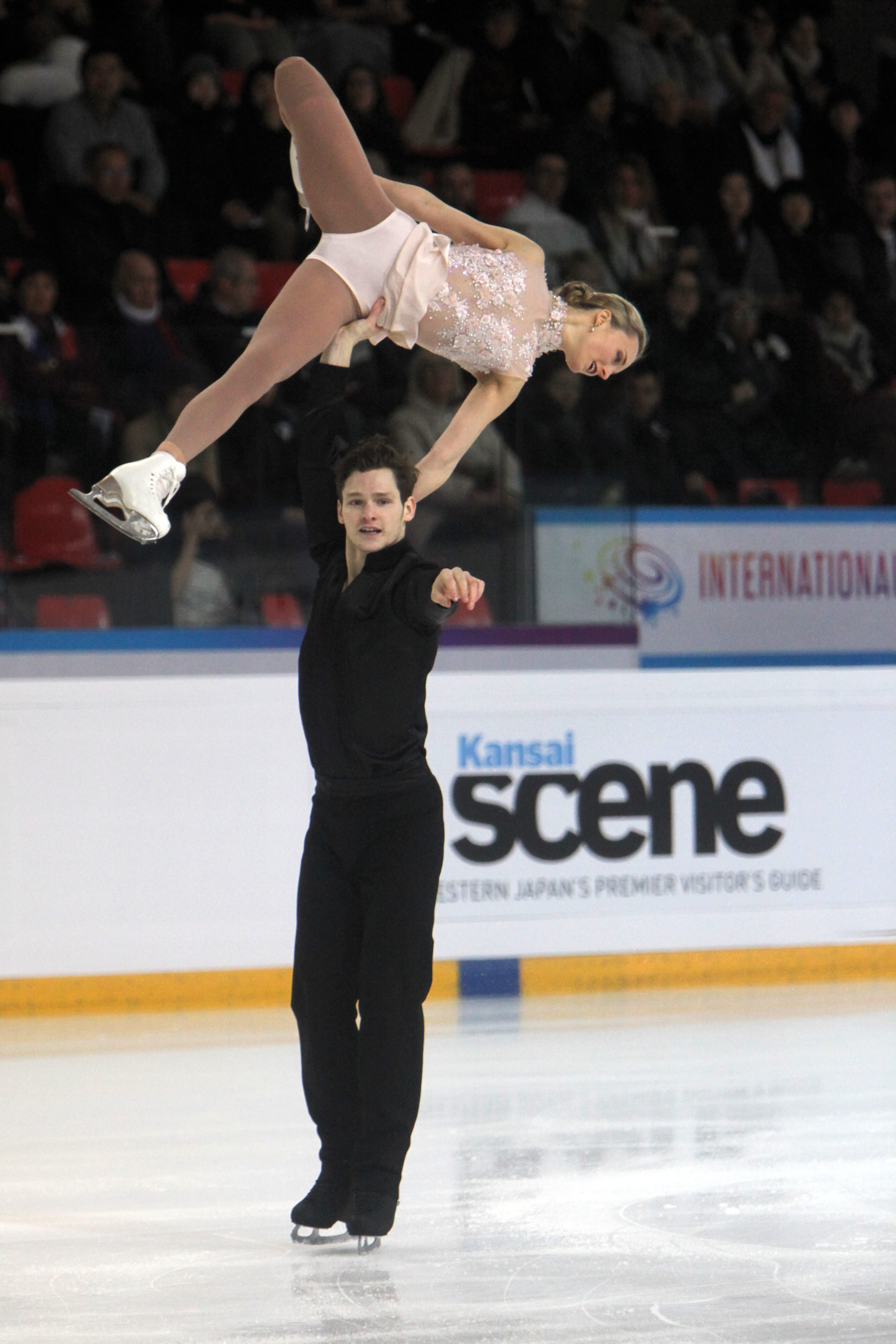
- Andrew Wolfe lifting Camille Ruest in the free skate of the 2018 Internationaux de France

Personal information
- Other names: Drew Wolfe
- Born: May 20, 1995 (age 31) Calgary, Alberta, Canada
- Height: 1.81 m (5 ft 11 1/2 in)

Figure skating career
- Country: Canada
- Partner: Camille Ruest
- Coach: Richard Gauthier, Bruno Marcotte, Sylvie Fullum
- Skating club: Glencoe Club Calgary
- Began skating: 2003
- Retired: May 28, 2021

Andrew Wolfe (born May 20, 1995) is a Canadian pair skater. With his skating partner, Camille Ruest, he is the 2019 Canadian national bronze medallist, and has represented Canada at the Four Continents and World Championships, placing eighteenth at the 2018 World Championships in Milan.

== Career ==
=== Early career ===
Wolfe began learning to skate in 2003. With Courtney Baay, he finished 10th in novice ice dancing at the 2011 Canadian Championships. He placed 7th in the junior men's event at the 2014 Canadian Championships.

In May 2014, Wolfe teamed up with Natasha Purich to compete in pair skating. They placed 4th at the 2014 CS Skate Canada Autumn Classic, 6th at the 2014 Cup of China, and 6th at the 2015 Canadian Championships. They were coached by Bruno Marcotte and Richard Gauthier in Montreal.

=== Partnership with Ruest ===
Wolfe and Camille Ruest formed their partnership in September 2015. They trained but did not compete during their first season together.

==== 2016–17 season ====
Ruest and Wolfe debuted in international competition at the 2016 CS Autumn Classic International, where they placed fourth. They then made their Grand Prix debut, placing sixth at the 2016 Rostelecom Cup. Their season concluded at the 2017 Canadian Championships, where they placed fifth.

==== 2017–18 season ====
After beginning the season with a tenth-place finish at the 2017 CS Nebelhorn Trophy, Ruest and Wolfe did not compete on the Grand Prix. The finished sixth at the 2018 Canadian Championships. As the top three finishers were sent to the 2018 Winter Olympics, Ruest and Wolfe earned their first ISU Championship assignment, the 2018 Four Continents Championships in Taipei, where they finished seventh.

Following the retirement of Meagan Duhamel and Eric Radford, they were sent to the 2018 World Championships in Milan, where they finished eighteenth. They later credited the experience of competing at the World Championships as motivating them to keep improving.

==== 2018–19 season ====
Ruest and Wolfe began their season at the 2018 U.S. International Classic, where they finished fifth. Assigned to two Grand Prix events, they finished eighth at the 2018 Skate Canada International and fifth at the 2018 Internationaux de France.

At the 2019 Canadian Championships, they won the bronze medal, placing third in the short program and fourth in the free skate, despite an aborted lift. They were named to Canada's team for the 2019 Four Continents Championships. They finished eighth there.

==== 2019–20 season ====
Following the end of the 2018–19 season, Ruest underwent knee surgery. Returning to competition at the 2019 U.S. Classic, Ruest/Wolfe placed seventh. At their first Grand Prix assignment, 2019 Skate America, Ruest/Wolfe placed sixth. Shortly after the competition, Ruest was diagnosed with a new labral tear in her hip. They were sixth as well at the 2019 Internationaux de France.

==== 2020–21 season ====
Ruest/Wolfe were assigned to the 2020 Skate Canada International, but the event was cancelled as a result of the coronavirus pandemic.

On May 28, 2021, Ruest and Wolfe announced that they would be retiring from competitive skating, as Ruest's ongoing hip issues made continuing dangerous.

== Programs ==
=== With Ruest ===
| Season | Short program | Free skating | Exhibition |
|---|---|---|---|
| 2020–2021 | Let Me Down Easy by Max Frost choreo. by Julie Marcotte | Leave a Light On by Tom Walker | |
| 2019–2020 | Let Me Down Easy by Max Frost choreo. by Julie Marcotte | Turning Page by Sleeping at Last choreo. by Julie Marcotte | |
| 2018–2019 | Wild Horses (Unplugged) performed by Alicia Keys & Adam Levine choreo. by Julie Marcotte | Turning Page by Sleeping at Last choreo. by Julie Marcotte | |
| 2017–2018 | Oblivion by Astor Piazzolla performed by Marisa Lemcke choreo. by Julie Marcotte | Earth Song by Michael Jackson; Home by Armand Amar choreo. by Julie Marcotte | |
| 2016–2017 | Something performed by Jim Sturgess; Kinetic Love by Karl Hugo choreo. by Julie Marcotte | Earth Song by Michael Jackson; Home by Armand Amar choreo. by Julie Marcotte | Showdown by Black Eyed Peas |

=== With Purich ===
| Season | Short program | Free skating |
|---|---|---|
| 2014–2015 | Three Hours Past Midnight by Colin James | The Artist by Ludovic Bource; The Artist Ouverture; At the Kinograph Studios; Waltz for Peppy; Comme une rosee des larmes; My Suicide 03. 29. 1967 |

== Competitive highlights ==
GP: Grand Prix; CS: Challenger Series

=== Pairs with Ruest ===
International
| Event | 16–17 | 17–18 | 18–19 | 19–20 | 20–21 |
|---|---|---|---|---|---|
| Worlds | | 18th | | | |
| Four Continents | | 7th | 8th | | |
| GP France | | | 5th | 6th | |
| GP Rostelecom Cup | 6th | | | | |
| GP Skate America | | | | 6th | |
| GP Skate Canada | | | 8th | | C |
| CS Autumn Classic | 4th | | | | |
| CS Nebelhorn Trophy | | 10th | | | |
| CS U.S. Classic | | | 5th | 7th | |
National
| Canadian Champ. | 5th | 6th | 3rd | | |
| SC Challenge | 3rd | | | | |
| Section Québec | | 1st | | | |
TBD = Assigned; C = Event Cancelled

=== Pairs with Purich ===
International
| Event | 2014–15 |
|---|---|
| GP Cup of China | 6th |
| CS Autumn Classic | 4th |
National
| Canadian Championships | 6th |

=== Men's singles ===
National
| Event | 09–10 | 10–11 | 11–12 | 12–13 | 13–14 |
|---|---|---|---|---|---|
| Canadian Champ. | WD | 9th N | 7th J | 12th J | 7th J |
Levels: N = Novice; J = Junior

=== Ice dancing with Baay ===
National
| Event | 2010–11 |
|---|---|
| Canadian Championships | 10th N |
N = Novice level
