= Haven Denney =

American pair skater (born 1995)

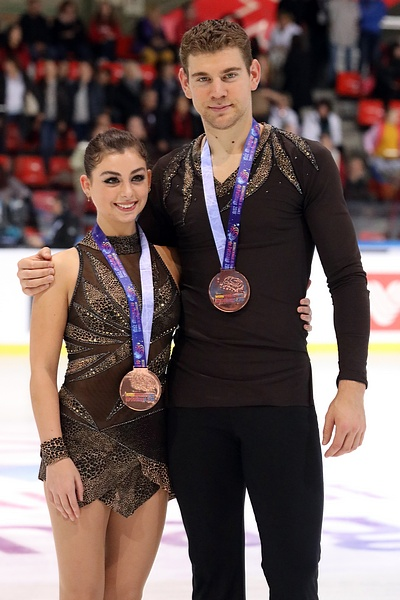
- Denney/Frazier at the 2019 Internationaux de France

Personal information
- Born: October 28, 1995 (age 31) Ocala, Florida, U.S.
- Home town: Aurora, Illinois, U.S.
- Height: 5 ft 0 in (1.52 m)

Figure skating career
- Country: United States
- Coach: John Zimmerman, Silvia Fontana
- Skating club: SC of New York
- Began skating: 2004
Medal record
Representing United States
Figure skating: Pairs
World Junior Championships
Gold medal – first place	2013 Milan	Pairs

Haven Denney (born October 28, 1995) is an American pair skater. With former partner, Brandon Frazier, she is a two-time Skate America silver medalist (2014, 2016), the 2014 CS Lombardia Trophy champion, the 2013 World Junior champion, and the 2017 U.S. national champion.

== Personal life ==
Haven Denney was born in Ocala, Florida. Her parents, DeeDee and Bryan Denney, both competed in roller skating. Haven won the 2003 U.S. pairs roller skating silver medal. She is the younger sister of U.S. pair skater Caydee Denney.

== Career ==
=== Early years ===
Haven Denney and Brandon Frazier first teamed up in 2002 as roller skaters before switching to the ice. As figure skaters, they competed together for three seasons from 2005 to 2008, coached by Jim Peterson and Lyndon Johnston. After two seasons on the juvenile level, the pair moved up a level and won the 2008 U.S. intermediate bronze medal. With their families living in different states, the skaters decided to part ways.

Denney then competed with Daniel Raad for three seasons.

=== 2011–12 season: Junior Grand Prix debut ===
Denney/Frazier teamed up again in spring 2011. They competed on the 2011–12 ISU Junior Grand Prix series, placing 8th and 7th in Latvia and Austria. They won the junior title at the 2012 U.S. Championships and were assigned to the 2012 World Junior Championships where they placed 4th. The pair was coached by Dalilah Sappenfield in Colorado Springs, Colorado until the fall of 2012 when they moved to Coral Springs, Florida to train with John Zimmerman and Silvia Fontana at Coral Gables.

=== 2012–13 season: World Junior title ===
In the 2012–13 season, Denney/Frazier finished 4th at the 2012–13 ISU Junior Grand Prix event held in Lake Placid, New York. They won gold at the 2013 World Junior Championships, the first American pair to win the title since 2007.

=== 2013–14 season: Grand Prix debut ===
For the 2013–14 season, the team placed fifth at both their Grand Prix events, the 2013 Skate Canada International and 2013 NHK Trophy. They were also fifth at the 2014 U.S. Championships and then fourth at the 2014 U.S. Championships.

=== 2014–15 season: First senior medals ===
In 2014–15, Denney/Frazier won medals at two Challenger Series events – gold at the 2014 CS Lombardia Trophy and silver at the 2014 CS Skate Canada Autumn Classic. Turning to the Grand Prix series, they won their first GP medal, silver, at the 2014 Skate America and then finished fourth at the 2014 Rostelecom Cup. In the second half of the season, Denney/Frazier won the silver medal at the 2015 U.S. Championships. After nationals, they began training full-time under Ingo Steuer. They finished 7th at the 2015 Four Continents and 12th at the 2015 World Championships.

In April 2015, Denney/Frazier changed their training location from Coral Springs, Florida, to West Palm Beach, Florida. Soon after, on April 22, Denney sustained a knee injury while practicing a throw double flip off the ice. She said, "When I landed, my foot stayed and my body kept rotating" and she then heard "a couple of loud pops". Having torn the anterior cruciate ligament, lateral collateral ligament, and bilateral and lateral meniscus in her right knee, she underwent surgery on April 28 at the Steadman Clinic in Vail, Colorado.

=== 2015–16 season ===
Denney put no weight on her right leg for six weeks and then began physical therapy before returning to the ice in October 2015. During this time, Frazier worked on his skating skills under Marina Zueva and her team in Canton, Michigan. In October, the pair started training at the Olympic Training Center in Colorado Springs. Initially limited to basic stroking and crossovers, Denney began cautiously practicing jumps in late November.

Denney/Frazier did not compete in the 2015–16 season. By April 2016, they were training with Rockne Brubaker and Stefania Berton at the Fox Valley Ice Center in Geneva, Illinois.

=== 2016–17 season: First national title ===
Denney/Frazier returned to competition, beginning at the 2016 CS Ondrej Nepela Memorial, where they placed fourth. They received invitations to two Grand Prix events, the 2016 Skate America and 2016 Skate Canada International. They won the silver medal at Skate America, and finished fourth at Skate Canada International. They competed at a second Challenger event, the 2017 CS Golden Spin of Zagreb, again finishing fourth.

At the 2017 U.S. Championships, Denney/Frazier won the national title for the first time. Denney commented "I'm just so proud of where we are right now. We've worked so hard through our ups and downs and everything. I'm just very appreciative and blessed to be here." They were assigned to the 2017 Four Continents Championships, where they finished eighth, and the 2017 World Championships, where they placed twentieth in the short program and did not qualify for the free skate.

=== 2017–18 season ===
Denney/Frazier began the season at the 2017 U.S. Classic, where they placed fifth. They placed seventh at both of their Grand Prix events, the 2017 Skate America and 2017 Skate Canada International.

At the 2018 U.S. Championships, Denney/Frazier placed fifth. They were not selected for the 2018 Winter Olympics or any ISU Championship events. In spring 2018, the pair decided to rejoin John Zimmerman and Silvia Fontana, who are based at Florida Hospital Center Ice in Wesley Chapel, Florida.

=== 2018–19 season ===
Denney developed a stress fracture in her ankle early in the summer. Denney/Frazier won the bronze medal at their Challenger event to start the season, the 2018 CS Autumn Classic International. They placed sixth at the 2018 Skate Canada International, but had to withdraw from their second Grand Prix event, the 2018 Internationaux de France, because Denney's stress fracture had become too painful for her to skate.

At the 2019 U.S. Championships, Denney/Frazier won the silver medal, placing third in the short program and second in the free skate, making some errors on their jumps in the latter. Frazier remarked "There were some things we left out on the table, and that's what we are going to shoot for, to get better." At the 2019 Four Continents Championships, their final event of the season, they finished in fifth place. Side-by-side jump errors continued to plague them, which Denney said would be a focus for improvement in the off-season.

=== 2019–20 season & end of partnership ===
For the new season, Denney/Frazier revived their acclaimed The Lion King free skate from the 2014–2015 season. After placing sixth at the 2019 CS Nebelhorn Trophy, they won the bronze medal at the 2019 Skate America, managing a second-place finish in the free skate, and beating reigning US national champions Cain-Gribble/LeDuc. At their second Grand Prix event, the 2019 Internationaux de France, they placed third in the short program, with Denney landing an underrotated triple Salchow jump. She landed a clean triple Salchow in the free skate, though botched their intended three-jump combination and Denney/Frazier again placed second in that segment, winning their second bronze medal of the season. They again finished ahead of Cain-Gribble/LeDuc.

Denney/Frazier struggled at the 2020 U.S. Championships, beginning in the short program where Denney fell on their throw and then popped their planned triple jump as well, resulting in them finishing sixth in that segment. Despite further side-by-side jump errors and another throw fall in the free, they rose one ordinal to fifth overall.

On March 25, they announced that they were ending their partnership.

== Programs ==
(with Frazier)

Season	Short program	Free skating	Exhibition
2019–2020	Quidam (from Cirque du Soleil) by Benoît Jutras choreo. by Renée Roca	The Lion King by Hans Zimmer choreo. by Renée Roca	
2018–2019	Billie Jean performed by David Cook	Irrepressibles selection	
2017–2018	All Of Me by John Legend	Who Wants to Live Forever by Queen, David Garrett	
2016–2017	Don Juan choreo. by Marina Zueva	Somewhere in Time by John Barry choreo. by Marina Zueva	Oh! Darling by The Beatles
2014–2015	The Godfather by Nino Rota choreo. by John Zimmerman, Silvia Fontana	The Lion King by Hans Zimmer choreo. by Renée Roca	One by U2
2013–2014	Malagueña by Ernesto Lecuona	Notre-Dame de Paris by Riccardo Cocciante choreo. by Julie Marcotte	
2012–2013	Malagueña by Ernesto Lecuona	La Strada by Nino Rota choreo. by Julie Marcotte	Due respiri by Eros Ramazzotti performed by Chiara
2011–2012	Chicago	Pearl Harbor by Hans Zimmer	All That Jazz (from Chicago) by John Kander, Fred Ebb

== Competitive highlights ==
GP: Grand Prix; CS: Challenger Series; JGP: Junior Grand Prix

=== With Frazier ===
International
Event	11–12	12–13	13–14	14–15	16–17	17–18	18–19	19–20
Worlds				12th	20th			
Four Continents			4th	7th	8th		5th	
GP France							WD	3rd
GP NHK Trophy			5th					
GP Rostelecom Cup				4th				
GP Skate America				2nd	2nd	7th		3rd
GP Skate Canada			5th		4th	7th	6th	
CS Autumn Classic				2nd			3rd	
CS Golden Spin					4th			
CS Lombardia				1st				
CS Nebelhorn Trophy								6th
CS Nepela Memorial					4th			
CS U.S. Classic						4th		
Nepela Trophy			4th					
International: Junior
Junior Worlds	4th	1st						
JGP Austria	7th							
JGP Latvia	8th							
JGP USA		4th						
National
U.S. Champ.	1st J	5th	5th	2nd	1st	5th	2nd	5th

=== With Raad ===
National
Event	2009–10	2010–11
U.S. Championships	7th J	6th J
